= Père Lachaise station =

Métro station in Paris, France

Père Lachaise
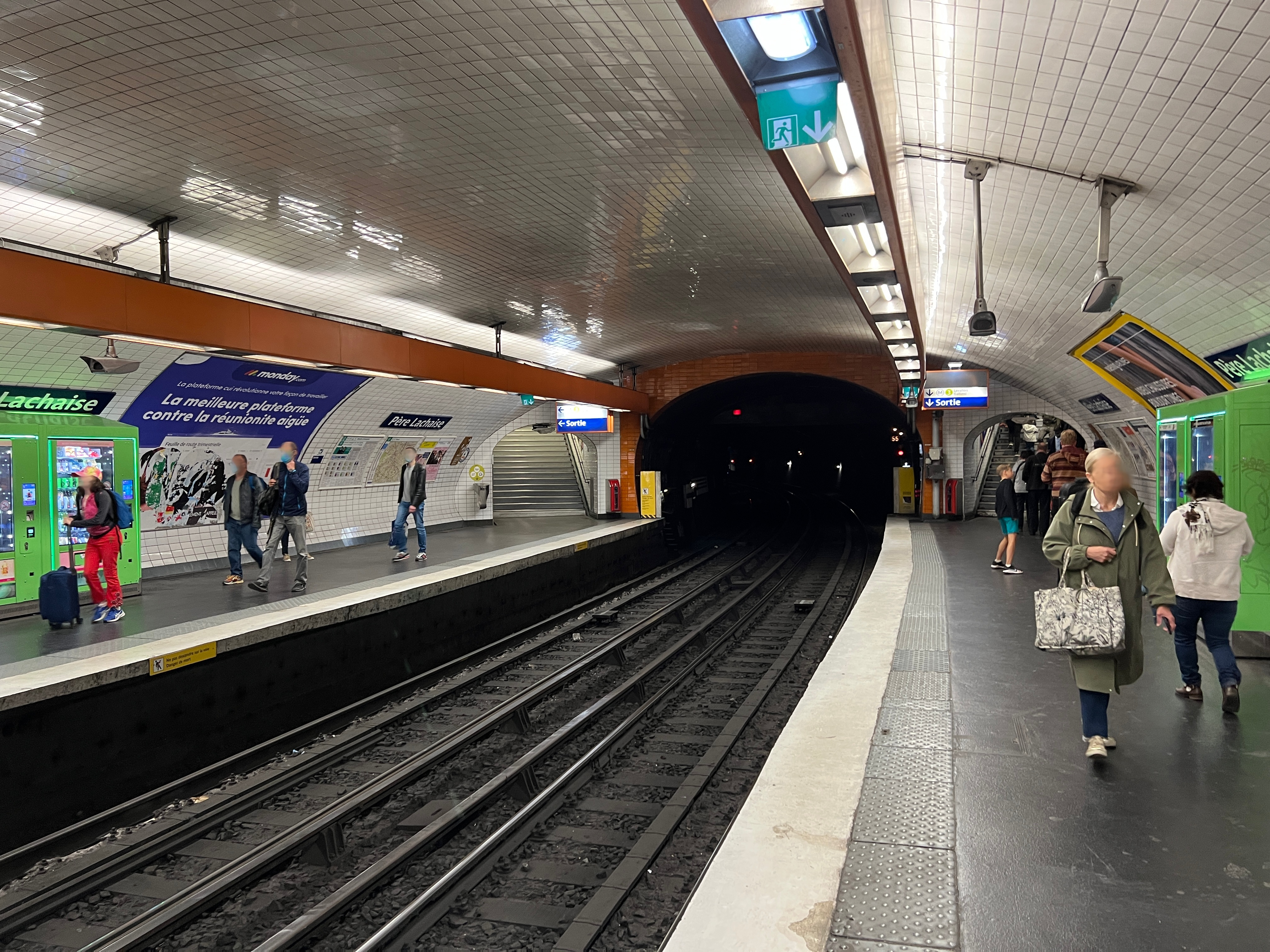
- Line 2 platforms

General information
- Location: 63 bis, boul. de Ménilmontant; Av. de la République × rue Spinoza; 11th arrondissement of Paris; Île-de-France; France
- Coordinates: 48°51′47″N 2°23′15″E
- Owner: RATP
- Operator: RATP

Other information
- Fare zone: 1

History
- Opened: 31 January 1903 (Line 2); 19 October 1904 (Line 3)

Services
Preceding station	Paris Metro	Following station
Ménilmontant towards Porte Dauphine	Line 2	Philippe Auguste towards Nation
Rue Saint-Maur towards Pont de Levallois–Bécon	Line 3	Gambetta towards Gallieni
Route map
Line 2
Line 3
Location
- Location within Paris

Père Lachaise (French pronunciation: [pɛʁ laʃɛːz]) is a station of the Paris Métro, serving Line 2 and Line 3 on the border of the 11th and 20th arrondissements.

== Location ==
The station is located at the intersection of Boulevard de Ménilmontant, Avenue de la République and Avenue Gambetta, west of Place Auguste-Métivier, the platforms being positioned:

- on line 2, south of the intersection, under Boulevard de Ménilmontant (between Ménilmontant and Philippe Auguste stations);
- on line 3, west of the intersection under the end of Avenue de la République (between Rue Saint-Maur and Gambetta, not counting the old Martin Nadaud station upstream of the second).

== History ==
The station was opened on 31 January 1903 as part of the extension of Line 2 (known at the time as "2 Nord") from Anvers to Bagnolet (now called Alexandre Dumas). The Line 3 platforms opened on 19 October 1904 as part of the first section of the line between Père Lachaise and Villiers. It was a terminus for three months until the line was extended to Gambetta on 25 January 1905.

The station is named for the Père Lachaise Cemetery, which it serves, and which in turn takes its name from Father François d'Aix de La Chaise, confessor to Louis XIV. It was the location of the Barrière de Amandiers, a gate built for the collection of taxation as part of the Wall of the Farmers-General; the gate was built between 1784 and 1788 and demolished during the 19th century.

In 1909, the station became the first metro station to have an escalator.

Like a third of the stations in the network, between 1974 and 1984 the platforms on both lines were modernized by adopting the Andreu-Motte style, in orange for line 2 and in yellow on line 3 with the layout being completed with flat white tiles replacing the original bevelled tiles in both cases. As part of the RATP's Renouveau du métro program, the station's corridors were renovated by 4 March 2005.

In 2018, 4,882,748 passengers entered this station, which places it at 95th position for metro stations for it usage.

== Passenger services ==
=== Access ===
The station has two entrances divided into three metro outlets:

- entrance 1 - Boulevard de Ménilmontant consisting of two back-to-back exits, one consisting of a Guimard entrance, a historic monuments decreed on 12 February 2016, the other consisting of an escalator going up, both emerging on the central reservation of Boulevard Ménilmontant, south of the intersection with the avenues of the Republic and Gambetta;
- entrance 2 - Avenue de la République, consisting of a fixed staircase decorated with a balustrade also designed by Hector Guimard and classified as a historic monument, located at the right of no. 103 of said avenue.

=== Station layout ===
G	Street Level	Exit/Entrance

B1	Mezzanine	to Exits/Entrances, connections between platforms

B2	Side platform, doors will open on the right
B2	Westbound	← toward Pont de Levallois – Bécon (Rue Saint-Maur)
B2	Eastbound	toward Gallieni (Gambetta) →
B2	Side platform, doors will open on the right

B3	Side platform, doors will open on the right
B3	Westbound	← toward Porte Dauphine (Ménilmontant)
B3	Eastbound	toward Nation (Philippe Auguste) →
B3	Side platform, doors will open on the right

=== Platforms ===
The platforms of the two lines are of standard configuration, two in number per stop, separated by the metro tracks located in the centre.

Those in line 2 have an elliptical vault and are furnished in the Andreu-Motte style with two orange light strips, tunnel exits partially covered with flat orange tiles and Motte seats of the same colour. The vault, the walls and part of the tunnel exits at the right of the entrances are covered with flat white tiles are aligned horizontally different from usual staggered arrangement of vaulted stations. The stopping point only shares this feature with the half-stations common to lines 8 and 10 at La Motte-Picquet – Grenelle and, until 2017, with Gare du Nord on line 4. The advertising frames are metallic, and the name of the station is written in Parisine font on enameled plates.

The platforms of line 3 are established flush with the ground; the ceiling consists of a metal deck, the beams of which are supported by vertical pillars. As for line 2, the platforms are furnished in the Andreu-Motte style with two yellow light strips and yellow and orange Motte seats. The yellow shade is also applied to the metal beams. The white ceramic tiles, placed vertically and aligned, are flat and cover the side walls, the tunnel exits and the outlets of the corridors. The advertising frames are metallic, and the name of the station is written in Parisine typography on enamelled plates.

== Nearby ==
- Père Lachaise Cemetery
- Lycée Voltaire
- Square de la Roquette
- Square Marcel-Rajman

== Gallery ==
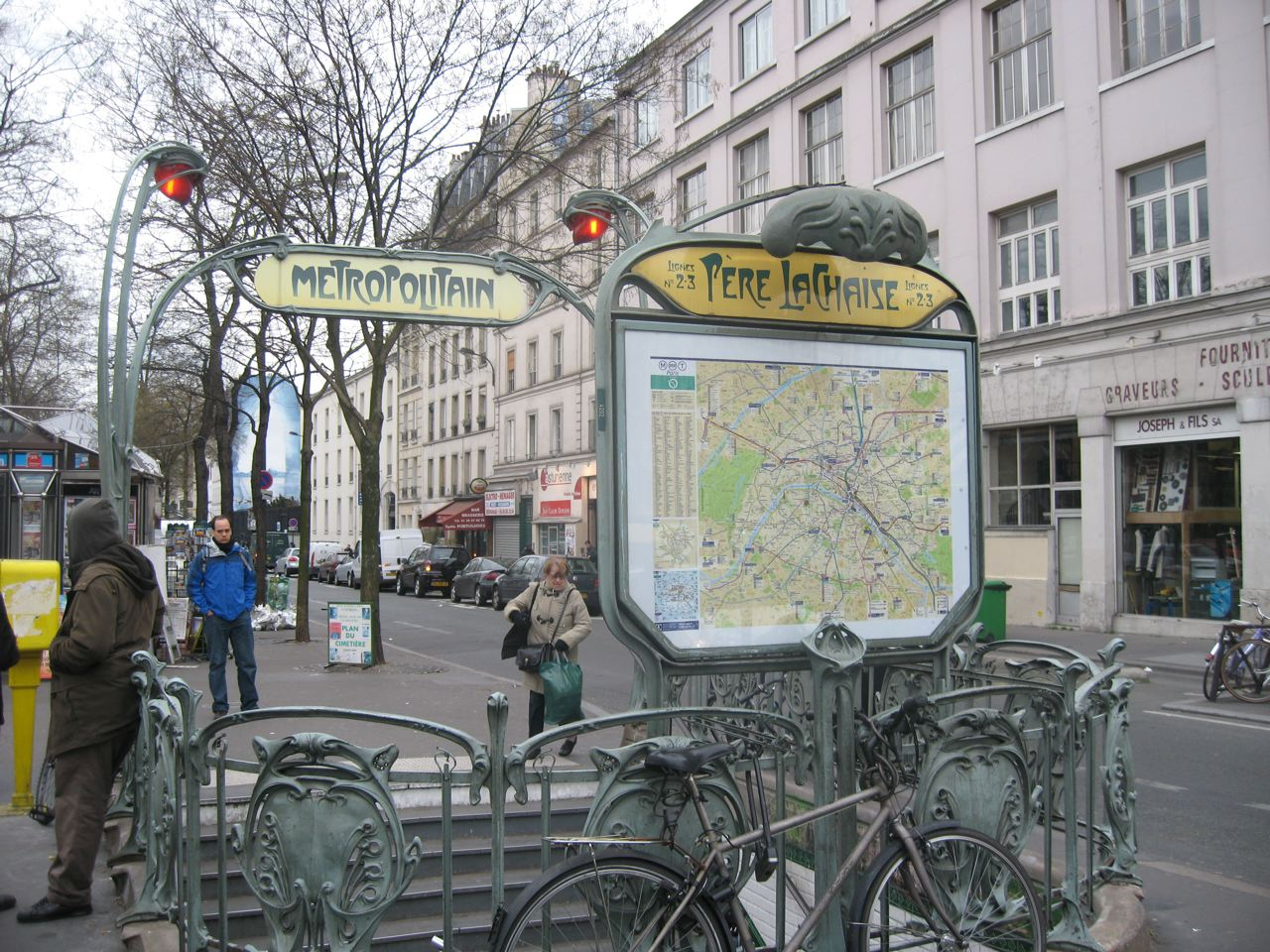
Street-level entrance to Père Lachaise

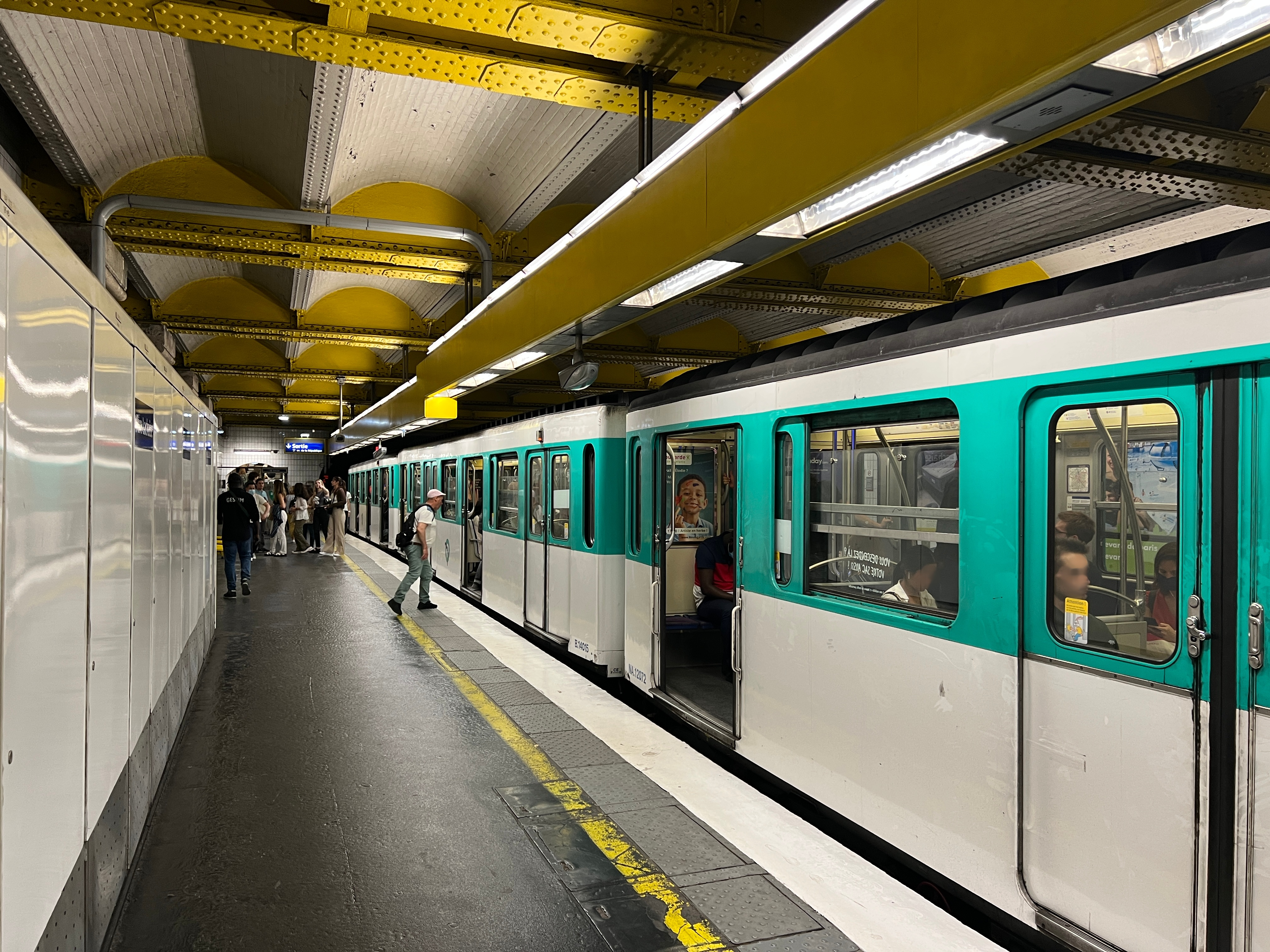
Line 3 platforms
