= Martin Nadaud station =

Former metro station in Paris, France

Coordinates: 48.8649°N 2.3981°E

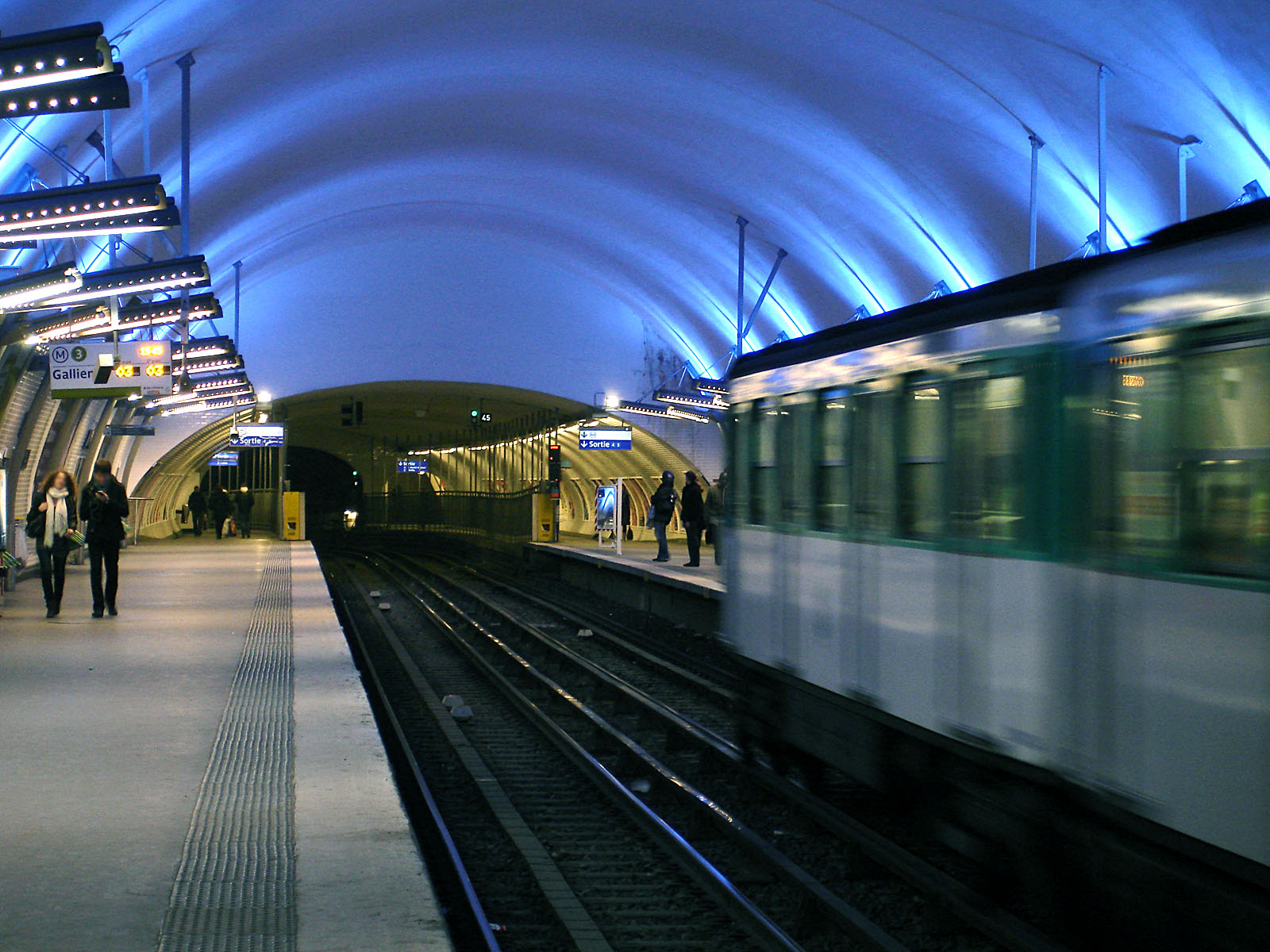
The former Martin Nadaud station, visible at the far end of this platform with its lower ceiling, is now integrated into Gambetta station.

Martin Nadaud is a merged station formerly serving Line 3, and is one of Paris Métro's ghost stations. The station was named after Martin Nadaud.

This station was absorbed into Gambetta following line reorganisation in 1969. During the 1960s, it became evident that Porte de Bagnolet was inadequately served by public transport, although strong demand existed. Therefore planners decided to extend line 3 towards Bagnolet from Place Gambetta. Because the number of travelers to Porte de Bagnolet was expected to be much larger than towards Porte des Lilas, development of a fork was rejected. The planned terminus at Porte des Lilas gave way to one at Bagnolet, with a shuttle comprising line 3a between the Gambetta station and the one at Porte des Lilas.

The Gambetta station was extensively redesigned, using the original station as the terminus of line 3a and creating new platforms for line 3. The Martin Nadaud station, only 232 meters from the old station, was absorbed by the new station. Its access and ticketing hall have now become an entrance to the Gambetta station. The entrance is located on Place Martin Nadaud.

The new Gambetta station was commissioned 23 August 1969, line 3a was established on 27 March 1971, and the extension to Bagnolet was opened to the public on 2 April 1971.
