= Porte de Bagnolet station =

Metro station in Paris, France

Porte de Bagnolet
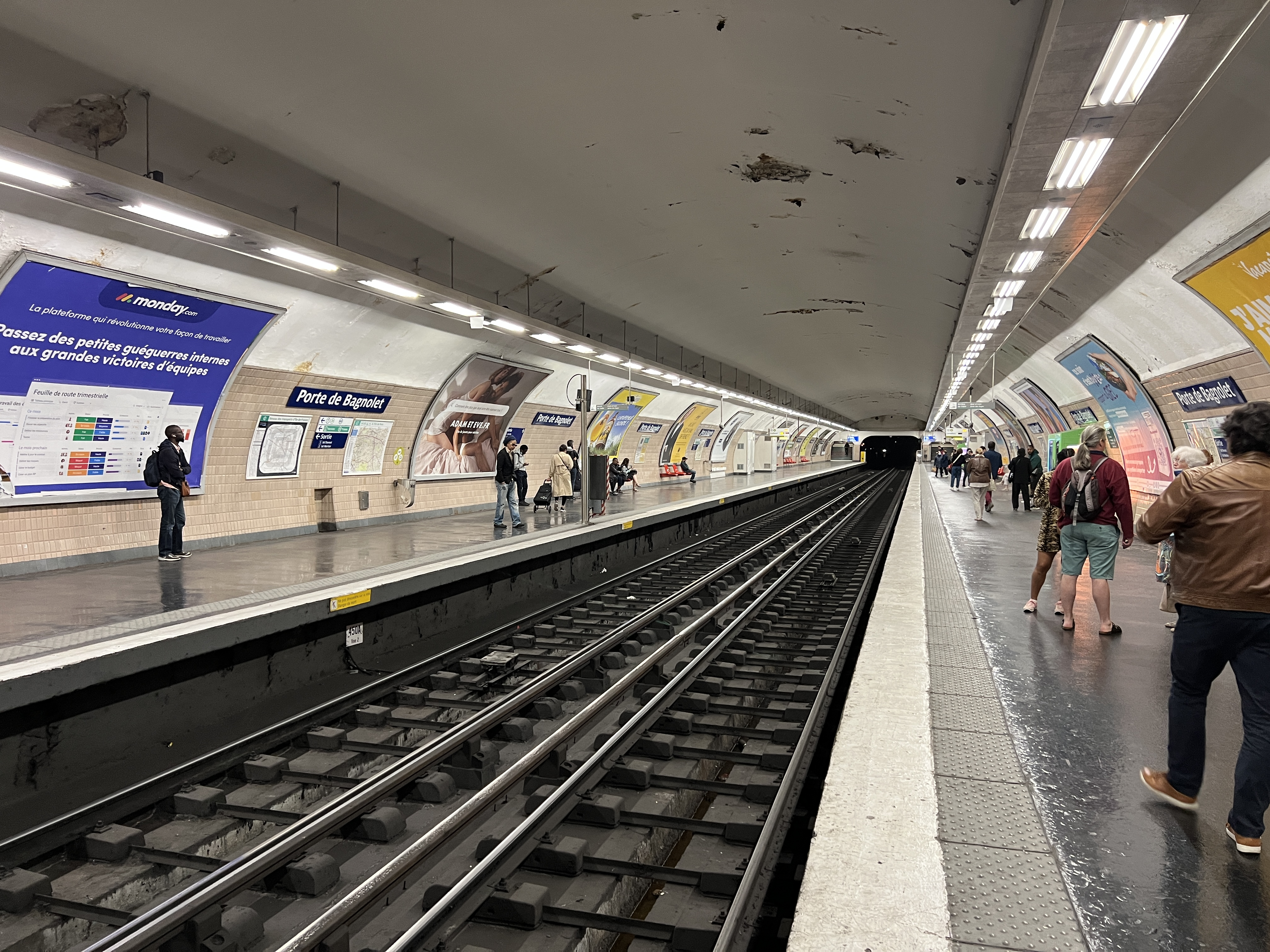

General information
- Location: Rue de la Py × rue Belgrand; Rue Belgrand × rue Émile Pierre Cas, odd Rue Belgrand × rue Émile Pierre Cas, even Boul. Mortier × rue Géo Chavez; Boul. Davout × rue Louis Ganne; 20th arrondissement of Paris; Île-de-France; France
- Coordinates: 48°51′52″N 2°24′26″E
- Owner: RATP
- Operator: RATP

Other information
- Fare zone: 1

History
- Opened: 2 April 1971

Services
Preceding station	Paris Metro	Following station
Gambetta towards Pont de Levallois–Bécon	Line 3	Gallieni Terminus
Preceding station	Tram	Following station
Séverine towards Porte Dauphine	T3b	Marie de Miribel towards Porte de Vincennes
Location
- Location within Paris

Porte de Bagnolet (French pronunciation: [pɔʁt də baɲɔlɛ]) is a station on Paris Métro Line 3, located in the 20th arrondissement of Paris.

== Location ==
The station is located under Rue Belgrand, between Place Édith-Piaf and Place de la Porte-de-Bagnolet. Oriented along an east–west axis, it is located between the Gambetta station and the eastern terminus of Gallieni.

== History ==
It was opened on 2 April 1971 when the line was extended from Gambetta to Gallieni, which replaced the old section to Porte des Lilas which was isolated to become the Line 3bis. The interchange with the tramway line 3b opened on 15 December 2012.

It is named after the Porte de Bagnolet, a gate in the nineteenth century Thiers Wall of Paris on the way to the commune of Bagnolet, probably named after some Roman baths located there. Porte de Bagnolet also constitutes one of the main access routes to the interior of Paris as well as the starting point of the A3 autoroute.

As part of the RATP's Metro Renewal program, the station's corridors were renovated on 16 November 2004.

In 2018, 4,347,994 travelers entered this station which places it in the 118th position of the metro stations for its usage.

== Passenger services ==
=== Access ===
The station has five entrances, each decorated with a mast with a yellow "M" inscribed in a circle:

- entrance 1 - Boulevard Davout, consisting of a fixed staircase lined with an escalator, leading to the right of no. 221 of this Boulevard;
- entrance 2 - Boulevard Mortier, also consisting of a fixed staircase and an ascending escalator, located southeast of Place Sully-Lombard;
- entrance 3 - Rue de la Py, consisting of a fixed staircase, located to the right of no. 60 Rue Belgrand;
- entrance 4 - Rue Belgrand, consisting of a fixed staircase, leading to no. 50 on this street;
- entrance 5 - Place Édith-Piaf, consisting of a fixed staircase, located to the south-east of the said Place, opposite no. 5 Pue de la Py.

Although the station was built in the 1970s, the sides of the corridors and the platform areas are covered with traditional bevelled white tiles following their modernization completed in late 2004.

=== Station layout ===
Street Level

B1	Mezzanine

Line 3 platforms	Side platform, doors will open on the right
Line 3 platforms	Westbound	← toward Pont de Levallois – Bécon (Gambetta)
Line 3 platforms	Eastbound	toward Gallieni (Terminus) →
Line 3 platforms	Side platform, doors will open on the right

=== Platforms ===
Porte de Bagnolet is a standard configuration station. It has two 105-meter-long platforms separated by the metro tracks and the vault is elliptical. However, due to the difficult nature of the subsoil, composed of an anarchic mixture of gypsum, sand and clay, it is placed on eighty piles of one meter in diameter, anchored in limestone at a depth of twenty-seven meters. The decoration, typical of the 1970s, is like the Mouton-Duvernet style with walls covered with bevelled beige tiles placed vertically and aligned, a white painted vault as well as two hanging lighting strips. The metallic advertising frames are grey and protruding, and the name of the station is written in Parisine font on enamelled plates. The Motte style seats are red.

=== Other connections ===
The station is served by the tram line T3b, by bus lines 57, 76, 102 and 351 of the RATP Bus Network and, at night, by lines N16 and N34 via the Noctilien bus network.

== Nearby ==
- Porte de Bagnolet
- Campagne à Paris

== Gallery ==
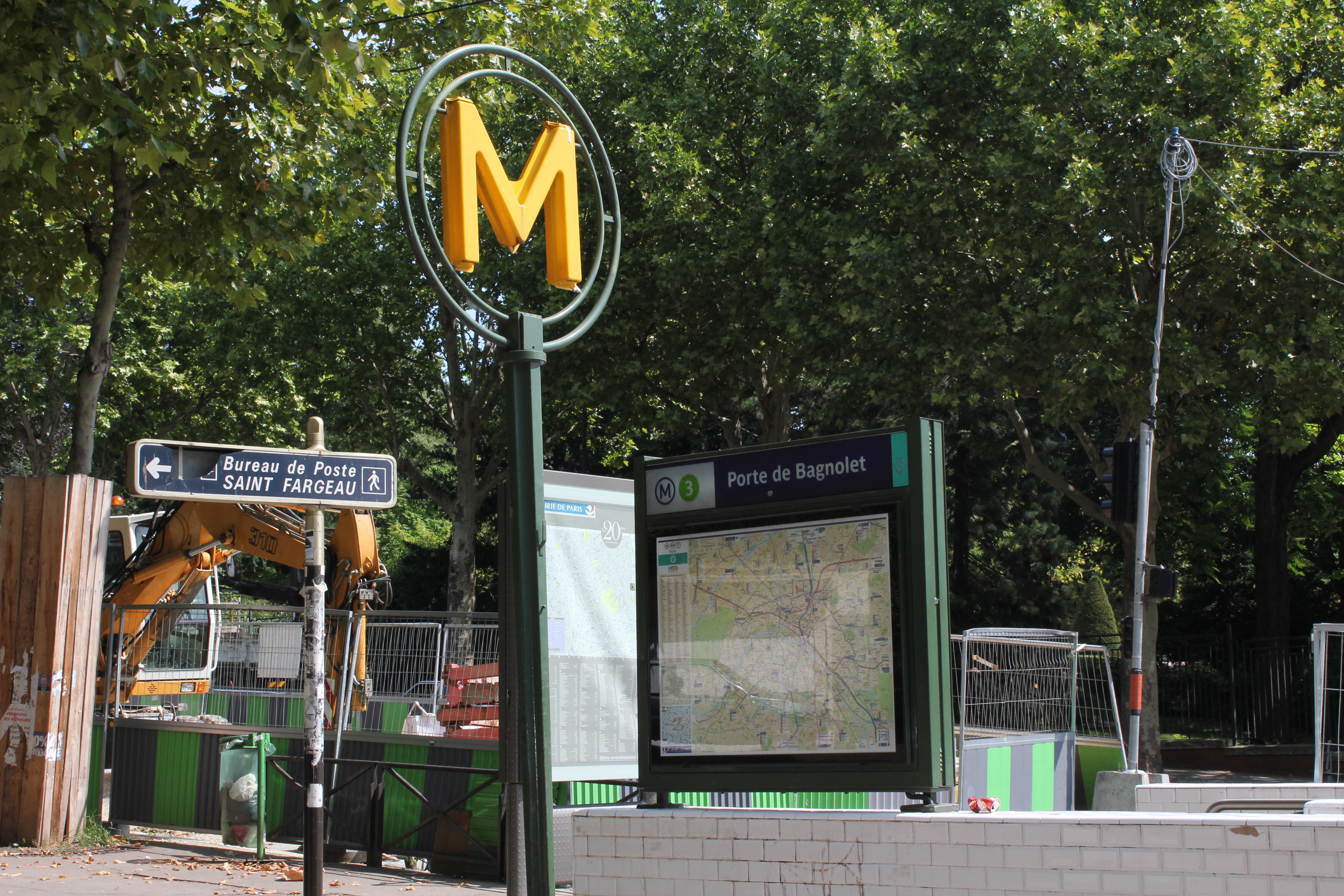
Street-level entrance at Porte de Bagnolet

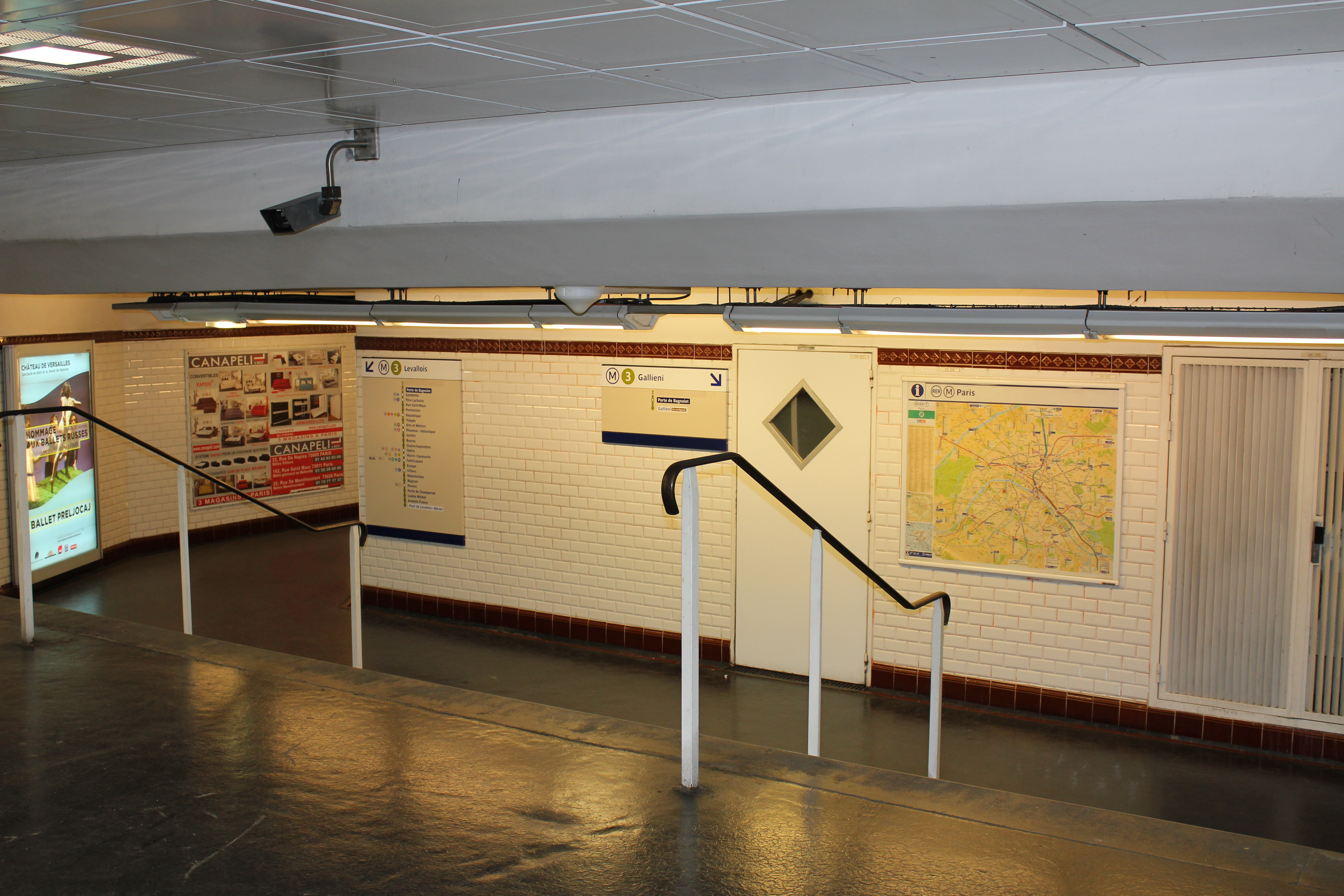
Porte de Bagnolet station concourse
