= Gambetta station =

Metro station in Paris, France

Gambetta
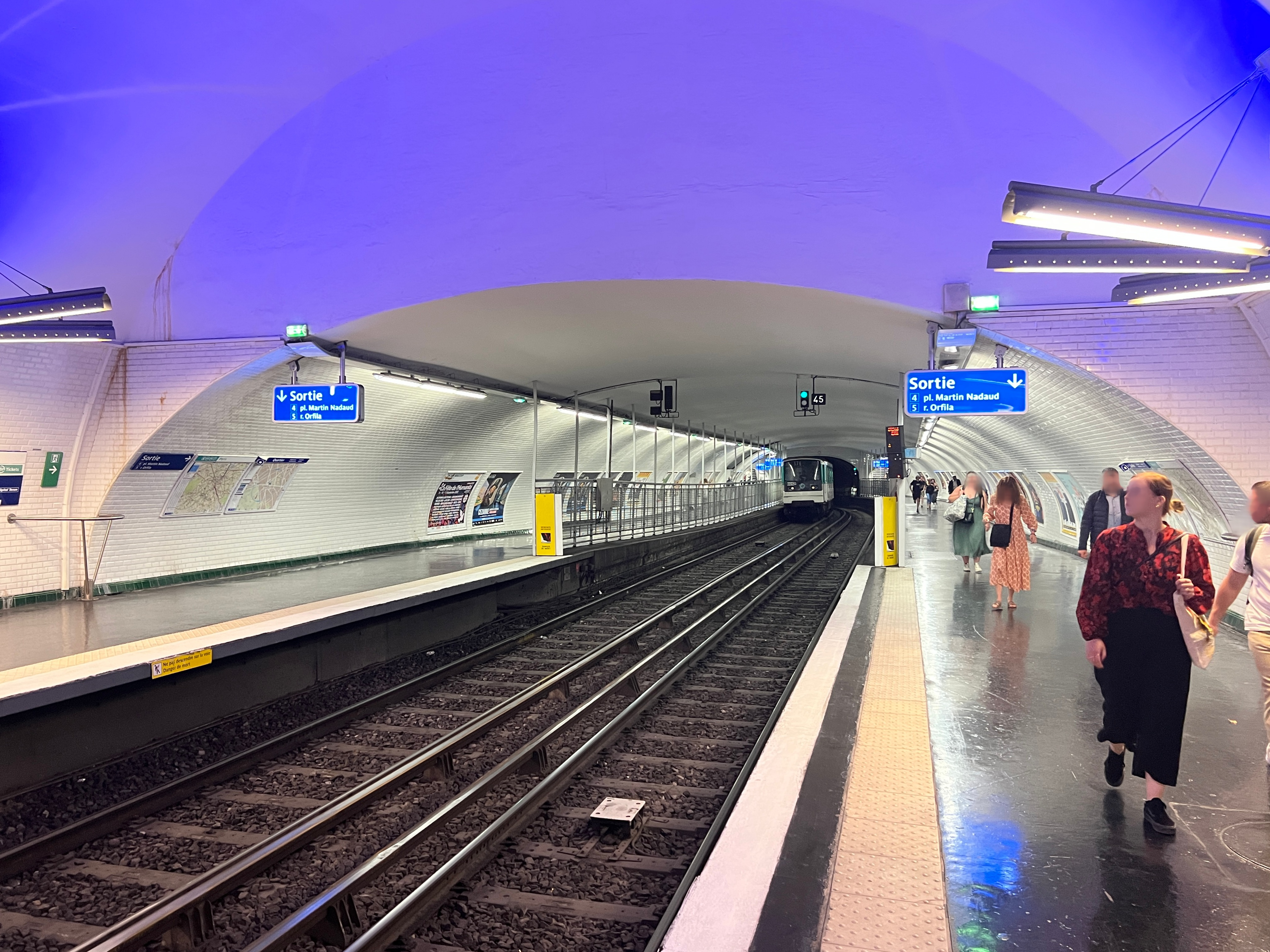
- Gambetta station Martin Nadaud as seen in background in June 2022

General information
- Location: Av. du Père Lachaise × rue des Pyrénées; Rue Belgrand × av. Gambetta; Rue des Pyrénées × av. Gambetta; Pl. Martin Nadaud × av. Gambetta; 4, pl. Martin Nadaud; 20th arrondissement of Paris; Île-de-France; France
- Coordinates: 48°51′54″N 2°23′54″E
- Owner: RATP
- Operator: RATP

Other information
- Fare zone: 1

History
- Opened: 25 January 1905

Services
Preceding station	Paris Metro	Following station
Père Lachaise towards Pont de Levallois–Bécon	Line 3	Porte de Bagnolet towards Gallieni
Terminus	Line 3bis	Pelleport towards Porte des Lilas
Location
- Location within Paris

Gambetta (French: [ɡɑ̃bɛta]) is a station of the Paris Metro. It serves Line 3 and is the southern terminus of Line 3bis. It is located in the 20th arrondissement of Paris.

== Location ==
The station is located under Avenue Gambetta, the platforms are positioned:

- on line 3, between Place Gambetta and Place Martin-Nadaud on an east–west axis (between Père Lachaise and Porte de Bagnolet stations);
- on line 3 bis, north-east of the square, along the town hall of the 20th arrondissement along a north-east / south-west axis (preceded by Pelleport).

== History ==
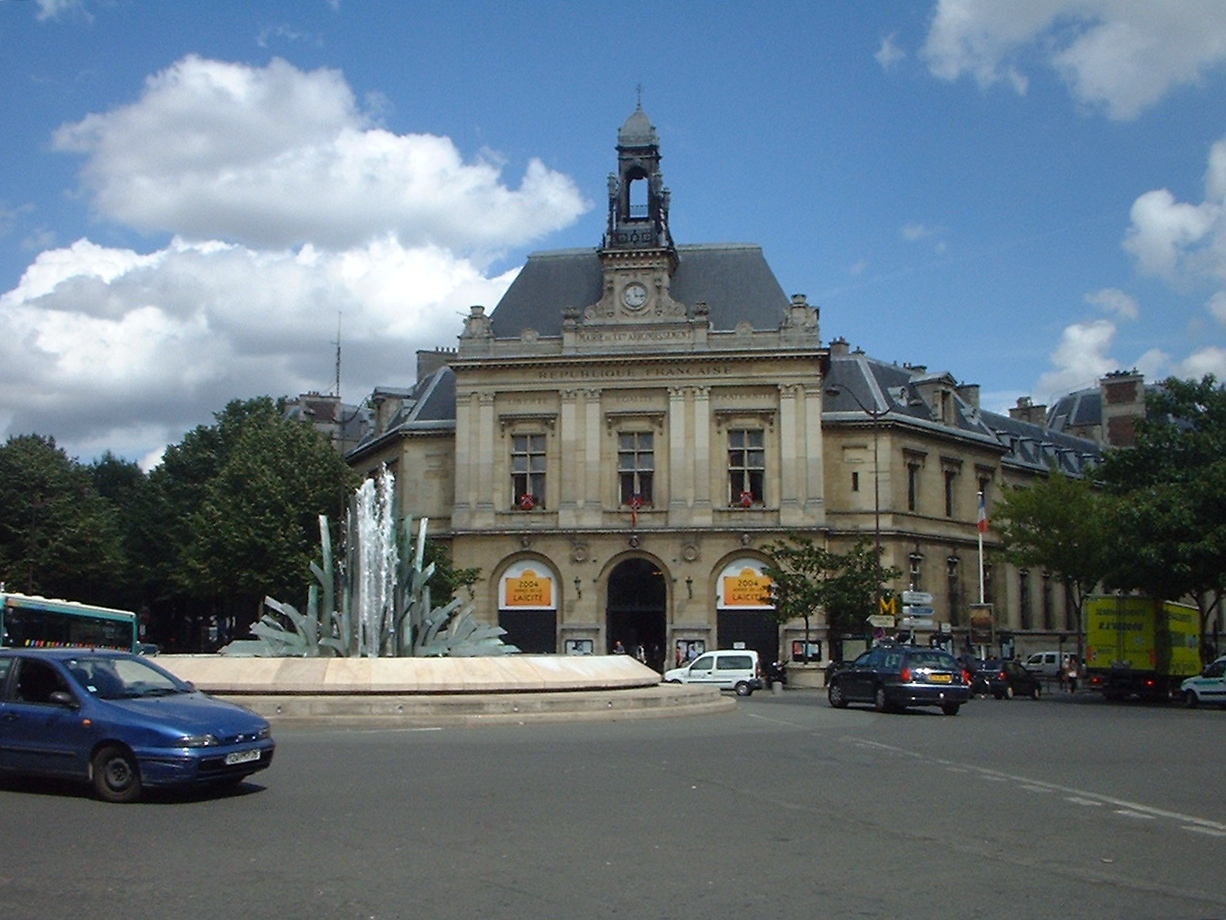
The Place Gambetta above the station and the town hall of the 20th arrondissement

Gambetta was opened on 25 January 1905 when the line was extended from Père Lachaise and was the eastern terminus of the line until 27 November 1921, when the line was extended to Porte des Lilas.

In 1969, the former Martin Nadaud station, which was only 232 metres west of Gambetta, was combined with Gambetta by linking Martin Nadaud's closed platforms with Gambetta by tunnel. On 23 March 1971 the line to Porte des Lilas was separated from line 3 and became Line 3bis. The beginning of the old tunnel to Porte des Lilas now connects the platforms of lines 3 and 3bis. On 2 April 1971 line 3 was extended to Gallieni.

As part of the RATP Renouveau du métro program, the station was renovated by reconnecting with the classic bevelled white tiles, first in corridors by 6 February 2004, then on the platforms of line 3 by 5 November 2008.

The station is in the Avenue Gambetta, which is named after the statesman Léon Gambetta (1838–82), Prime Minister for 66 days in 1881 and 1882.

In 2018, 7,137,504 passengers entered this station which placed it at the 41st position of the metro stations for its usage.

== Passenger services ==
=== Access ===
- Entrance: 20th arrondissement town hall, Rue Belgrand, hôpital Tenon
- Entrance: corner of Avenue du Père-Lachaise and Rue des Pyrénées
- Entrance: Avenue Gambetta, Rue des Pyrénées
- Entrance: Place Martin-Nadaud, Rue Orfila
- Entrance: Place Martin-Nadaud, Avenue Gambetta

=== Station layout ===
Street Level

B1	Mezzanine

Line 3 platforms	Side platform, doors will open on the right
Line 3 platforms	Westbound	← toward Pont de Levallois–Bécon (Père Lachaise)
Line 3 platforms	Eastbound	toward Gallieni (Porte de Bagnolet) →
Line 3 platforms	Side platform, doors will open on the right

Line 3bis platforms	Northbound	toward Porte des Lilas (Pelleport) →
Line 3bis platforms	Island platform, doors will open on the left, right
Line 3bis platforms	Northbound	toward Porte des Lilas (Pelleport) →

=== Platforms ===
Line 3 station is standard configuration with two platforms separated by metro tracks under an elliptical vault. On the other hand, the stopping point is of an unusual length, because its western end, established in a slight curve, consists of the platforms of the former Martin Nadaud station, absorbed in 1969, their border is now fitted with railings. A clear difference in height is also visible between the two parts of the vault. Following the modernization of the station completed in 2008, the new stop point on line 3 is provided with specific lighting, provided by four-branched candelabras diffusing white light on the platforms and bluish on the painted white vault. The lighting of the Martin Nadaud station is carried out by tubes that are usually found in certain corridors of renovated stations. The bevelled white ceramic tiles cover the walls and part of the tunnel exits. The advertising frames are in white ceramic and the name of the station is written in Parisine font on enamelled plates. The Akiko style seats are green.

The station on line 3 bis, the former departure station for the terminus loop, consists of two tracks on either side of a central platform under an elliptical vault, with a dead-end buffer stop on the south side. Established in a curve, it is completely covered with bevelled white tiles and devoid of advertising frames on its sides; the enamelled name plates in Parisine font are only present on the island platform. The latter is fitted with red Motte style seats and lit by a tube strip.

=== Bus connections ===
The station is served by lines 26, 60, 61, 64, 69, 102 and the La Traverse de Charonne urban service of the RATP bus network and, by night, by lines N16 and N34 of the Noctilien network.

== Nearby ==
- Père Lachaise Cemetery
- Hôpital Tenon
- Mairie du 20e arrondissement
- Théâtre national de la Colline

== Gallery ==
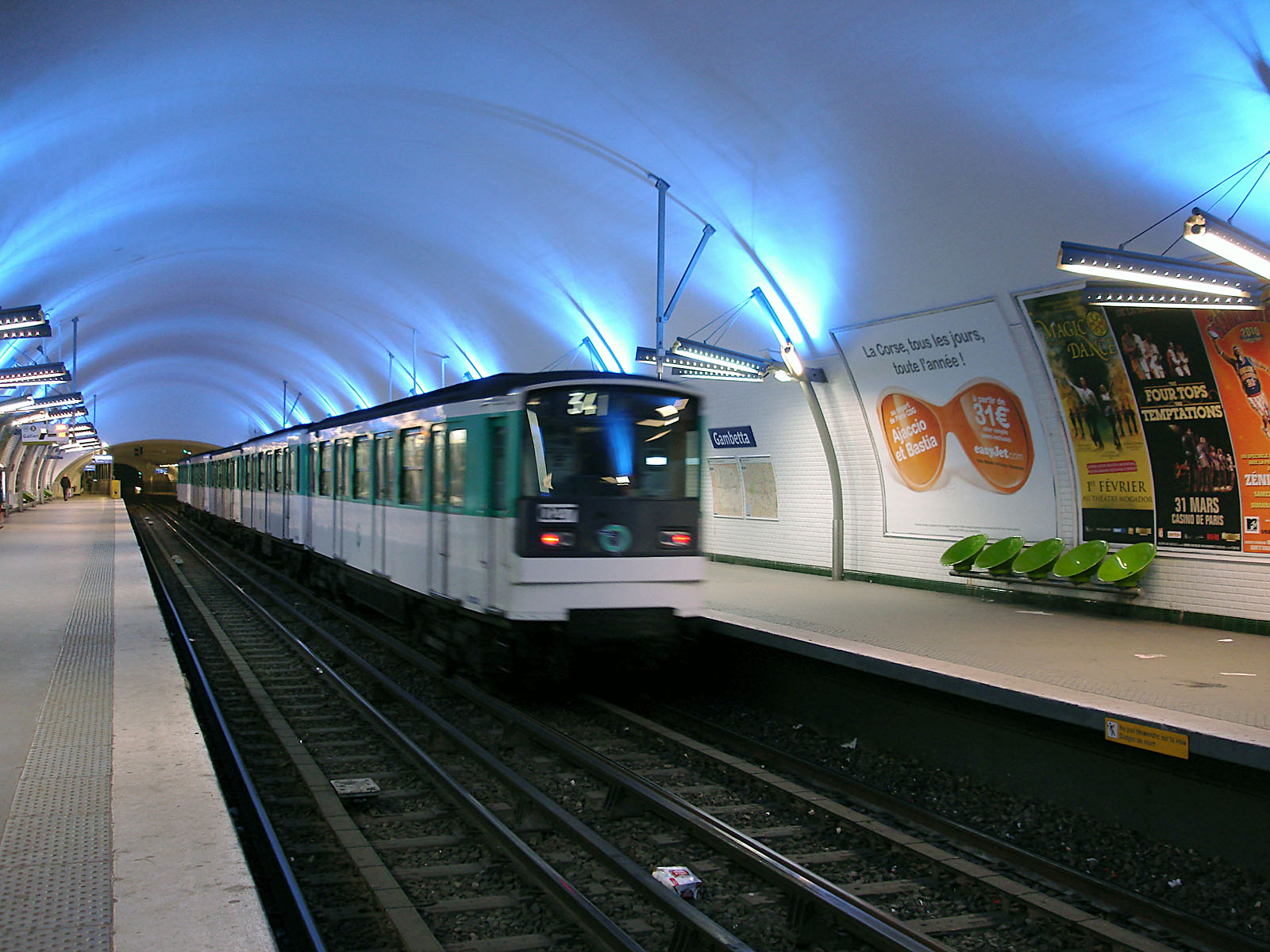
MF 67 rolling stock on Line 3 at Gambetta

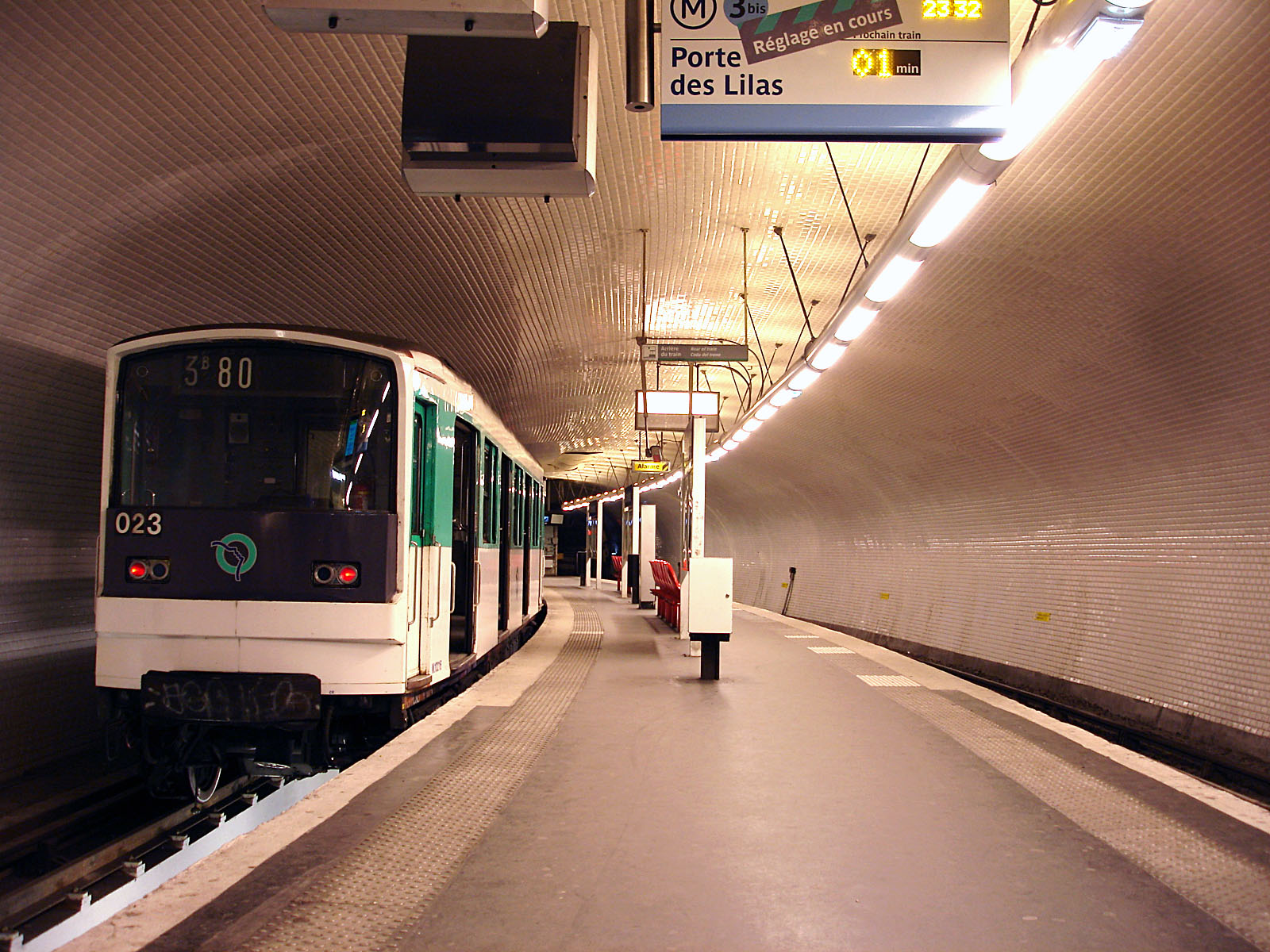
Line 3bis platforms at Gambetta

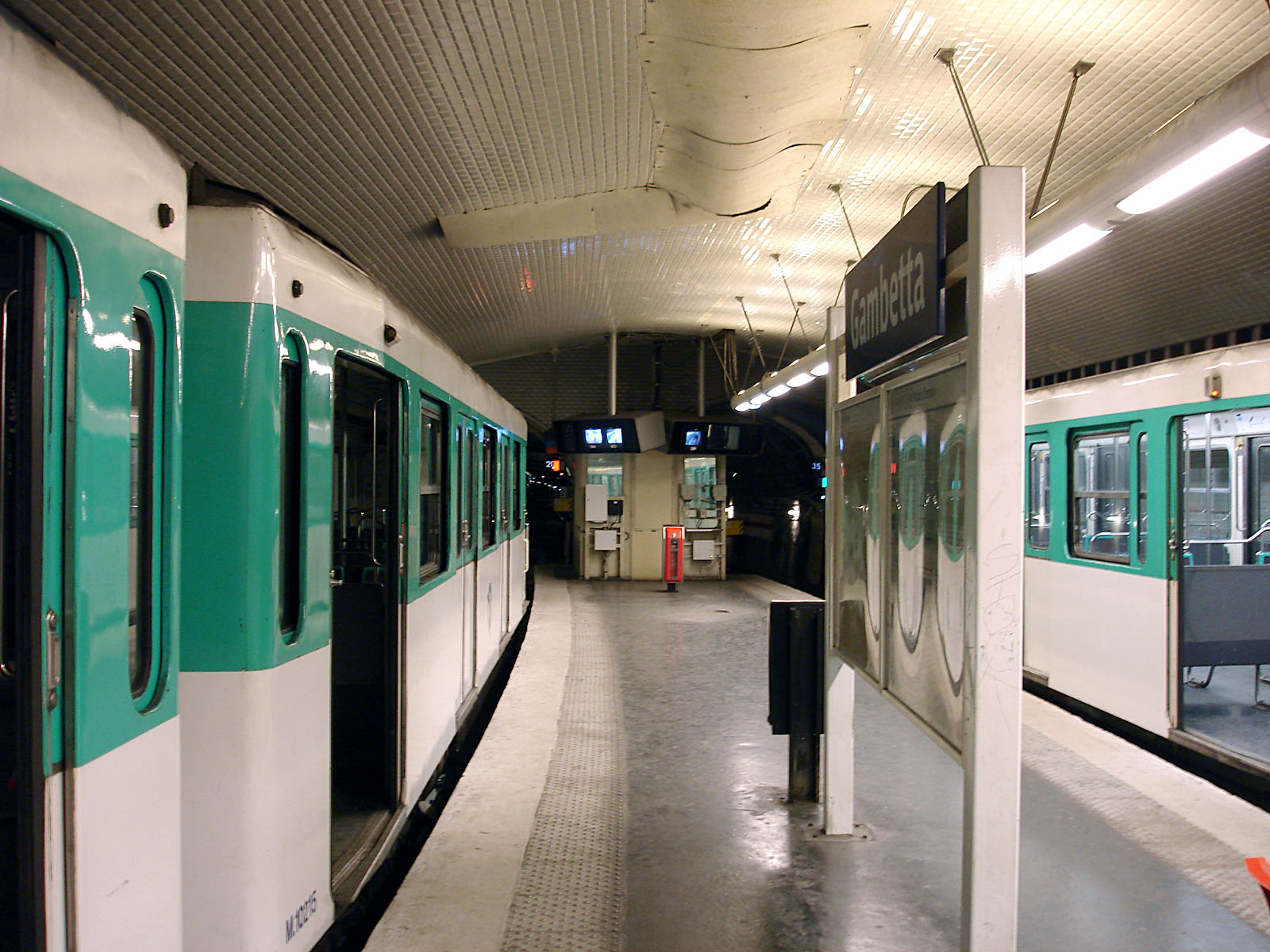
Line 3bis platforms at Gambetta
