= Gallieni station =

Metro station in Bagnolet, France

Gallieni
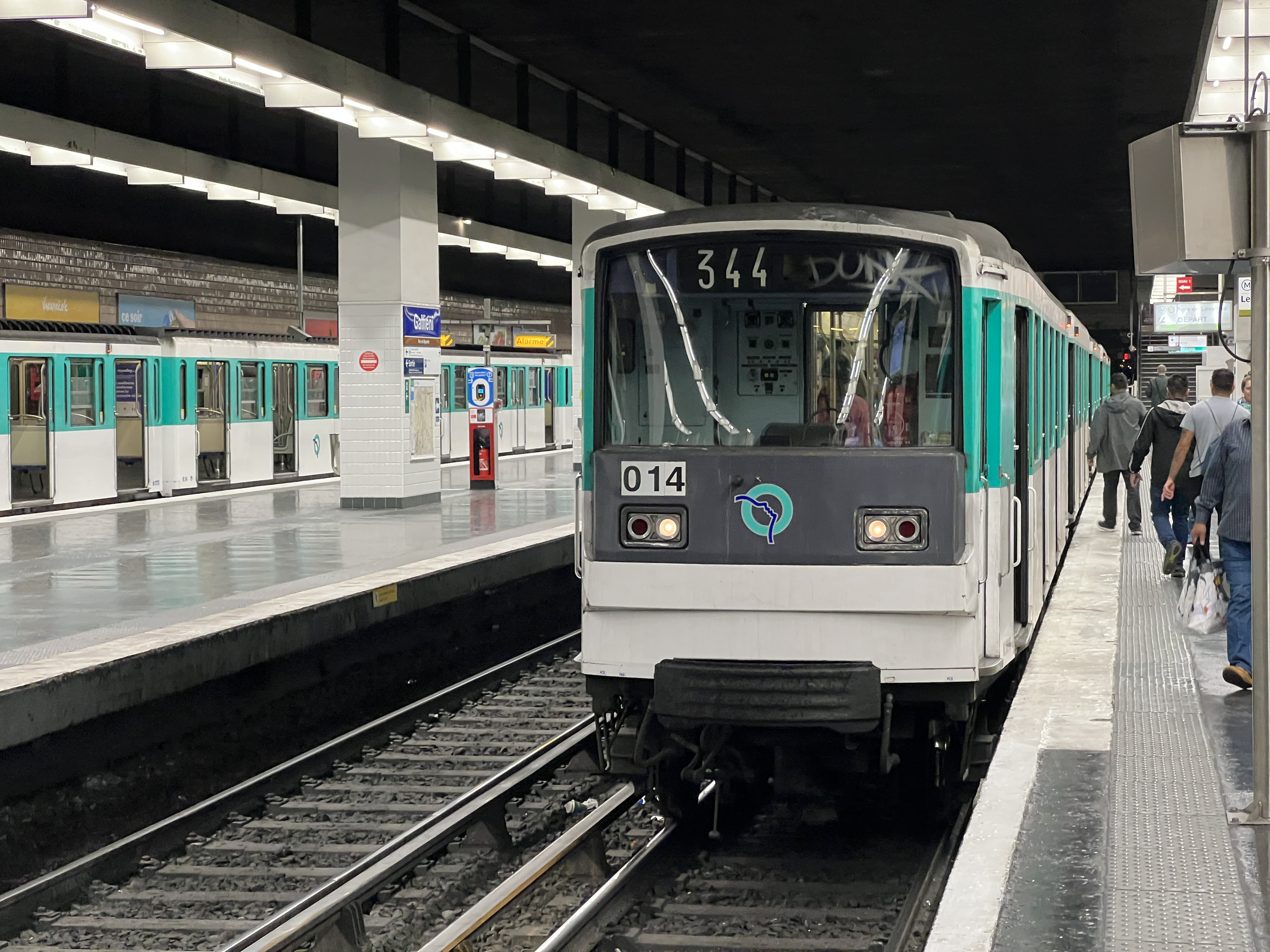
- MF 67 at Gallieni

General information
- Other names: Parc de Bagnolet
- Location: Av. du Général de Gaulle; Bus depot Bagnolet; Île-de-France; France
- Coordinates: 48°51′49″N 2°24′57″E
- Owner: RATP
- Operator: RATP

Other information
- Fare zone: 2

History
- Opened: 2 April 1971

Services
Preceding station	Paris Metro	Following station
Porte de Bagnolet towards Pont de Levallois–Bécon	Line 3	Terminus
Location
- Location within Paris

Gallieni (Parc de Bagnolet; French pronunciation: [ɡaljeni paʁk də baɲɔlɛ]) is a station on Line 3 of the Paris Métro, being its eastern terminus.

== Location ==
The station is located under the Paris-Gallieni International Bus Station, in the heart of a motorway complex at the junction of the A3 autoroute and the Boulevard Périphérique Paris ring-road. Oriented along an east–west axis, it is preceded by or followed by the Porte de Bagnolet metro station.

== History ==
It was opened on 2 April 1971 when the line was extended from Gambetta in order to improve the service to the town of Bagnolet. It has since been the new eastern terminus, replacing the previous terminus at Porte des Lilas, the section between the latter and Gambetta station, disconnected since 27 March 1971 and became the current line 3bis. It is situated on the Avenue Gallieni, which is named after General Joseph Gallieni, famous for commandeering 600 taxis to take troops to the front to help save Paris during the First Battle of the Marne in 1914.

The station bears the subtitle Parc de Bagnolet because of its proximity to the northwest end of Parc Jean-Moulin-Les Guilands, shared between the municipalities of Bagnolet and Montreuil.

In the course of the 2010s, the tiling on the walls supporting the station's ceiling was renovated, changing from beige to the characteristic white of the metro network, the upper part was left bare and painted white.

In 2018, 5,841,623 passengers entered this station, which places it at the 70th position of the metro stations for its usage.

== Passenger services ==
=== Access ===
The station has two entrances:

- entrance 1 - Shopping Center, consisting of a fixed staircase decorated with a mast with a yellow M inscribed in a circle, emerging under two road ramps connecting the Boulevard Périphérique to the A3 autoroute, to the right of the Bel Est commercial center;
- entrance 2 RATP Bus Station, consisting of a fixed staircase lined with an escalator allowing only the exit, located slightly further south, opposite the said bus station. Although the station was built in the 1970s, the sides of the exchange room are covered with traditional bevelled white tiles.

=== Station layout ===
Street Level

B1	Mezzanine

Line 3 platforms	Island platform, doors will open on the right
Line 3 platforms	Westbound	← toward Pont de Levallois – Bécon (Porte de Bagnolet)
Line 3 platforms	Eastbound	Alighting passengers only →
Line 3 platforms	Island platform, doors will open on the right

=== Platforms ===
Gallieni is a station of a particular configuration. It has four tracks framing two island platforms. The trains arrive on the central tracks and depart from the central north and north side tracks, the south side track used for the train depot. The walls are vertical, as are the pillars, and support a horizontal ceiling covered with a black fire-resistant flocking. The decoration is typical of the 1970s: the bevelled ceramic tiles, placed vertically and aligned, are beige in colour on the walls (a colour that can be found at Porte de Bagnolet on the same line and at Kléber on line 6) and white on the pillars, the upper part of the latter being coated and painted white. The advertising frames are metallic and the name of the station, inscribed on enamelled plates, is in Helvetica font instead of the usual Parisine typography, a peculiarity that the station only shares with Place d'Italie on line 6 and Porte de Versailles on line 12. The Motte style seats are yellow.

=== Bus connections ===
The station has a bus station served by the RATP Bus Network, lines 76, 102, 122, 221, 318 and 351.

== Nearby ==
- Bel Est shopping center
- Parc de Bagnolet (parc départemental Jean-Moulin - Les Guilands)
- Centre d'affaires Gallieni 2
- Les Mercuriales
