= Porte des Lilas station =

Metro station in Paris, France

Porte des Lilas
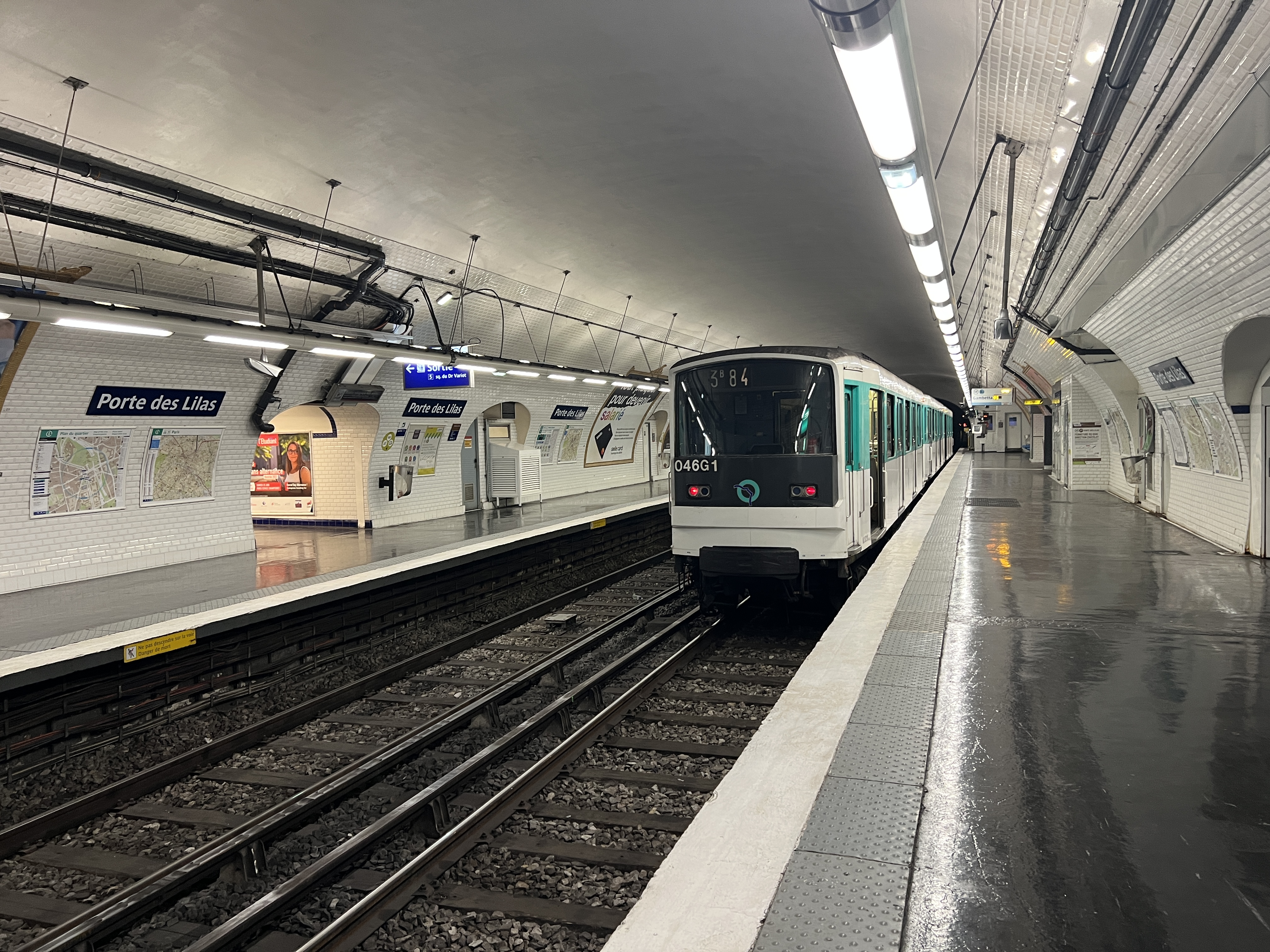
- MF 67 at Porte des Lilas (line 3bis)

General information
- Location: Boul. Serurier × Av. de Belleville; 261, av. Gambetta; 171, boul. Mortier; 19th arrondissement of Paris; Île-de-France; France
- Coordinates: 48°52′38″N 2°24′24″E
- Operator: RATP Group
- Platforms: 1 island platform, 5 side platforms
- Tracks: 7
- Connections: Tramways in Île-de-France Île-de-France tramway Line 3b

Construction
- Accessible: Yes

Other information
- Station code: 23-02
- Fare zone: 1

History
- Opened: 27 November 1921

Passengers
- 2,021,179 (2020)

Services
Preceding station	Paris Metro	Following station
Saint-Fargeau towards Gambetta	Line 3bis	Terminus
Télégraphe towards Châtelet	Line 11	Mairie des Lilas towards Rosny–Bois-Perrier
Preceding station	Tram	Following station
Hôpital Robert Debré towards Porte Dauphine	T3b	Adrienne Bolland towards Porte de Vincennes
Location
- Location within Paris

Porte des Lilas station (French pronunciation: [pɔʁt de lilɑ]) is a station of the Paris Metro. It serves Line 11 and is the northern terminus of Line 3bis. Located on the edge of the 19th and 20th arrondissements of Paris, it serves the neighborhood of the Porte des Lilas. The station is named after the nearby Porte des Lilas, a gate in the nineteenth century Thiers wall of Paris, which led to the town of Les Lilas.

The station was referred to in Serge Gainsbourg's famous 1958 chanson "Le poinçonneur des Lilas" about the ennui of a Metro employee's workday. A Scopitone music video for the song was filmed in Porte des Lilas, showing the singer in a Metro uniform, punching tickets.

Until January 2021 when Line 14 was extended to Porte de Clichy, Porte des Lilas was the only station at one of the gates of Paris to be served by two separate metro lines.

== History ==
The station was opened on 27 November 1921 when line 3 was extended from Gambetta to Porte des Lilas, serving as its eastern terminus. It was originally planned to operate services through to Pré-Saint-Gervais on the then line 7, hence, two separate stations were built – one before the reversal loop (the station used today) and another along the tracks leading to Pré-Saint-Gervais (Porte des Lilas – Cinéma). This plan, however, did not materialise and only a shuttle service operated between the station and Pré-Saint-Gervais via a tunnel called voie navette until 2 September 1939 when it was stopped due to the onset of World War II.

The line 11 platforms opened as part of the original section of the line from Châtelet to Porte des Lilas on 28 April 1935 and was its eastern terminus until it was extended to Mairie des Lilas on 17 February 1937. On 27 March 1971, the line 3 platforms were transferred to line 3bis on its establishment.

As part of modernization works for the extension of Line 11 to Rosny–Bois-Perrier in 2023 for the Grand Paris Express, an additional entrance will be added at rue des Glaïeuls and will be equipped with escalators. Entrance 2 will also be retrofitted with a lift to make the station accessible to those with reduced mobility. From 26 June 2021 to 29 August 2021, the station acted as line 11's eastern terminus when its original terminus, Mairie des Lilas, was closed for renovations.

In 2019, the station was used by 3,439,385 passengers, making it the 143rd busiest of the Metro network out of 302 stations.

In 2020, the station was used by 2,021,179 passengers amidst the COVID-19 pandemic, making it the 120th busiest of the Metro network out of 305 stations.

== Passenger services ==
=== Access ===
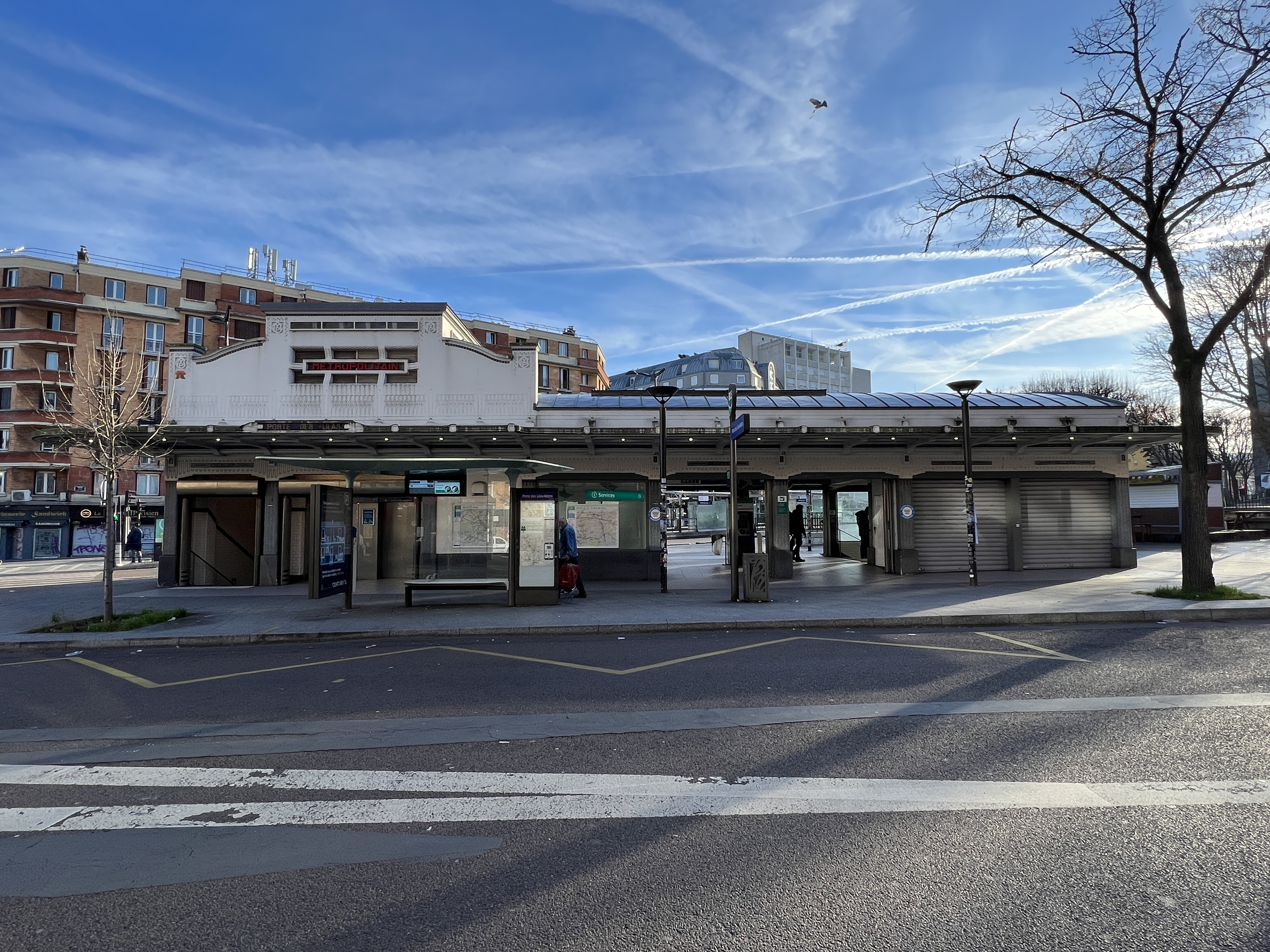
Entrance 1 with its original surface building

The station has five entrances:

- Entrance 1: avenue Gambetta (original surface building designed by Charles Plumet, similar to the ones at Pelleport and Saint-Fargeau on line 3bis)
- Entrance 2: boulevard Mortier
- Entrance 3: rue de Belleville
- Entrance 4: boulevard Sérurier
- Entrance 5: square du Dr. Variot

A sixth entrance used to exist at the corner of avenue Gambetta and rue des tourelles, in front of the Piscine des Tourelles, then known as Stade Nautique. It was removed during its reconstruction in 1989.

=== Station layout ===
G	Street Level	Exit/Entrance
B1	Mezzanine
Line 11 platforms	Westbound	← toward Châtelet (Télégraphe)
Line 11 platforms	Island platform, doors will open on the left, right
Line 11 platforms	Westbound	No regular service
Line 11 platforms	Eastbound	toward Rosny–Bois-Perrier (Mairie des Lilas) →
Line 11 platforms	Side platform, doors will open on the right
Line 3bis platforms	Side platform, doors will open on the right
Line 3bis platforms	Southbound	← toward Gambetta (Saint-Fargeau)
Line 3bis platforms	Northbound	Alighting passengers only →
Line 3bis platforms	Side platform, doors will open on the right
Porte des Lilas – Cinéma	Side platform, doors will open on the right
Porte des Lilas – Cinéma	Southbound	← No regular service (Haxo)
Porte des Lilas – Cinéma	Northbound	No regular service (Pré-Saint-Gervais) →
Porte des Lilas – Cinéma	Side platform, doors will open on the right

=== Platforms ===
==== Line 3bis ====
It has a standard configuration with 2 tracks surrounded by 2 side platforms.

==== Line 11 ====
It has a particular configuration specific to the stations serving or had served as a terminus. It has 2 half-stations – the one towards Mairie des Lilas consisting of a side platform and a single track and the one towards Châtelet consisting of an island platform with two tracks flanking it. The platform towards Châtelet contains a few mosaics on the walls – a portrait of Georges Brassens and two mosaics of lilies.

==== Porte des Lilas – Cinéma ====
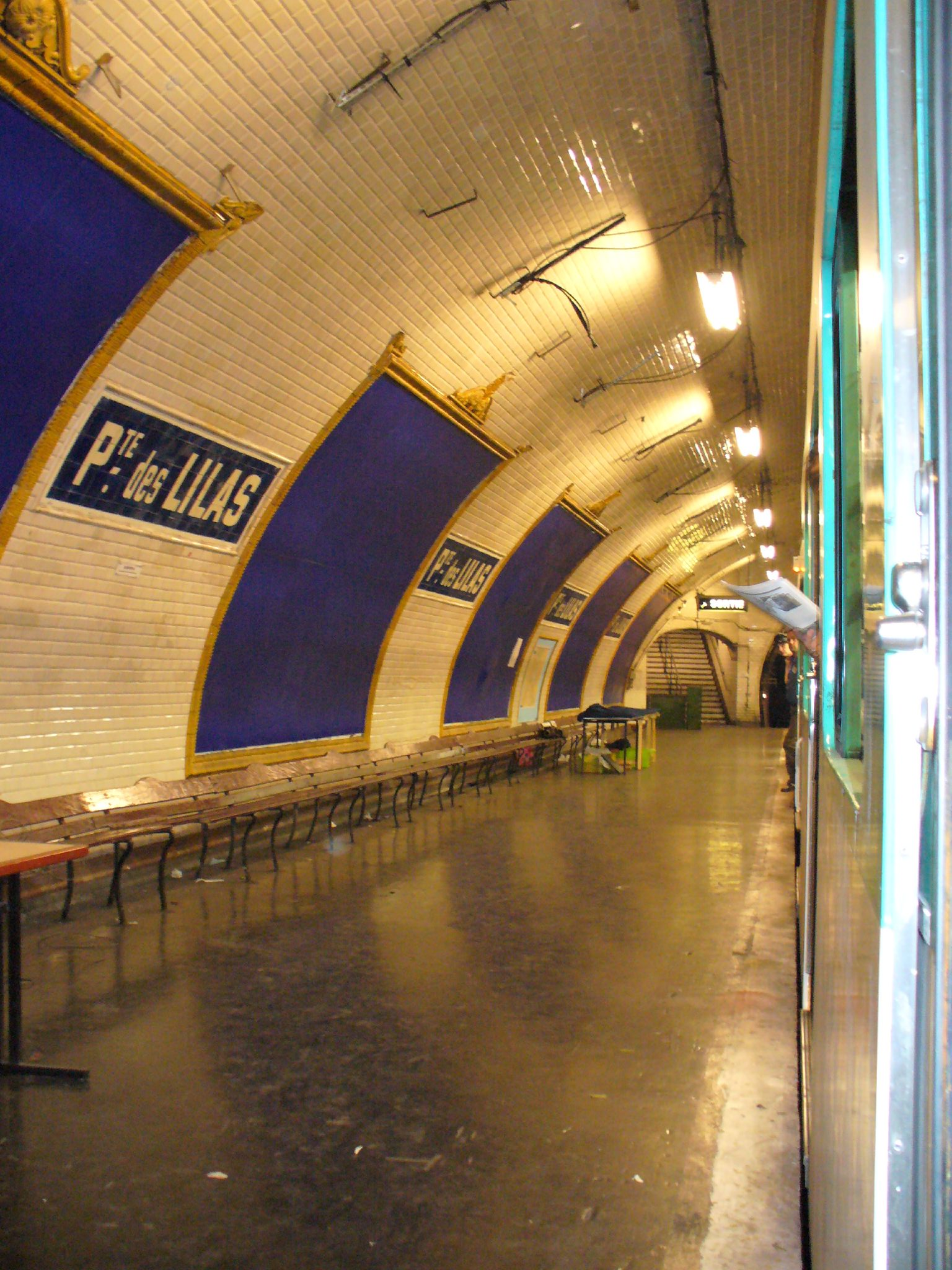
Porte des Lilas – Cinéma

It also has a standard configuration with 2 tracks surrounded by 2 side platforms, with one track made for steel-wheeled trains (leading to voie des Fêtes) and another for rubber-tyred trains (leading to voie Navette). Access to these platforms are usually restricted.

The disused station has been repurposed as a set for commercials, films, and music videos to avoid disrupting commercial services on the network, hence the nickname, cinéma.

Porte des Lilas – Cinéma was featured in a brief scene in Julie & Julia; in the French film The Past with the station panels and signs adapted for each film; and in John Wick: Chapter 4. An average of 5 films are shot per year and a day of filming costs between 15,000 and 18,000 euros, bringing over 200,000 euros in revenue each year.

=== Other connections ===
Since 15 December 2012, the station has been served by tramway T3b. It is also served by lines 20, 48, 61, 64, 96, 105, 115, 129, 170, and 249 of the RATP bus network, and at night, by lines N12 and N23 of the Noctilien bus network.

== Nearby ==
- Caserne des Tourelles (headquarters of the Directorate General for External Security)
- Cirque Électrique
- Cinéma CGR Paris-Lilas
- Hôpital Robert-Debré
- Paris Archives
- Piscine Georges-Vallerey
- Square du Docteur-Variot

== Gallery ==
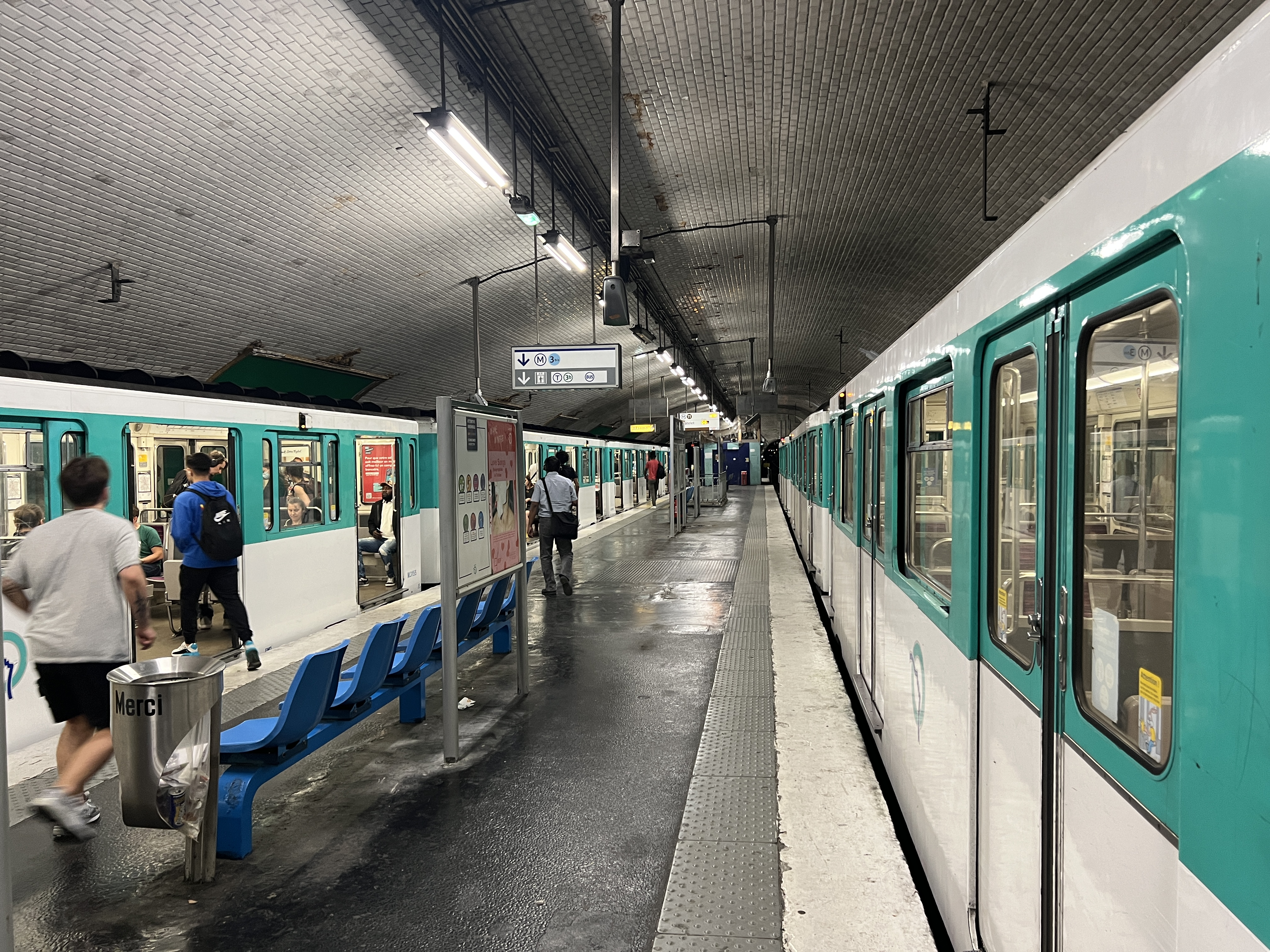
MP 59 at Porte des Lilas towards Châtelet (line 11)

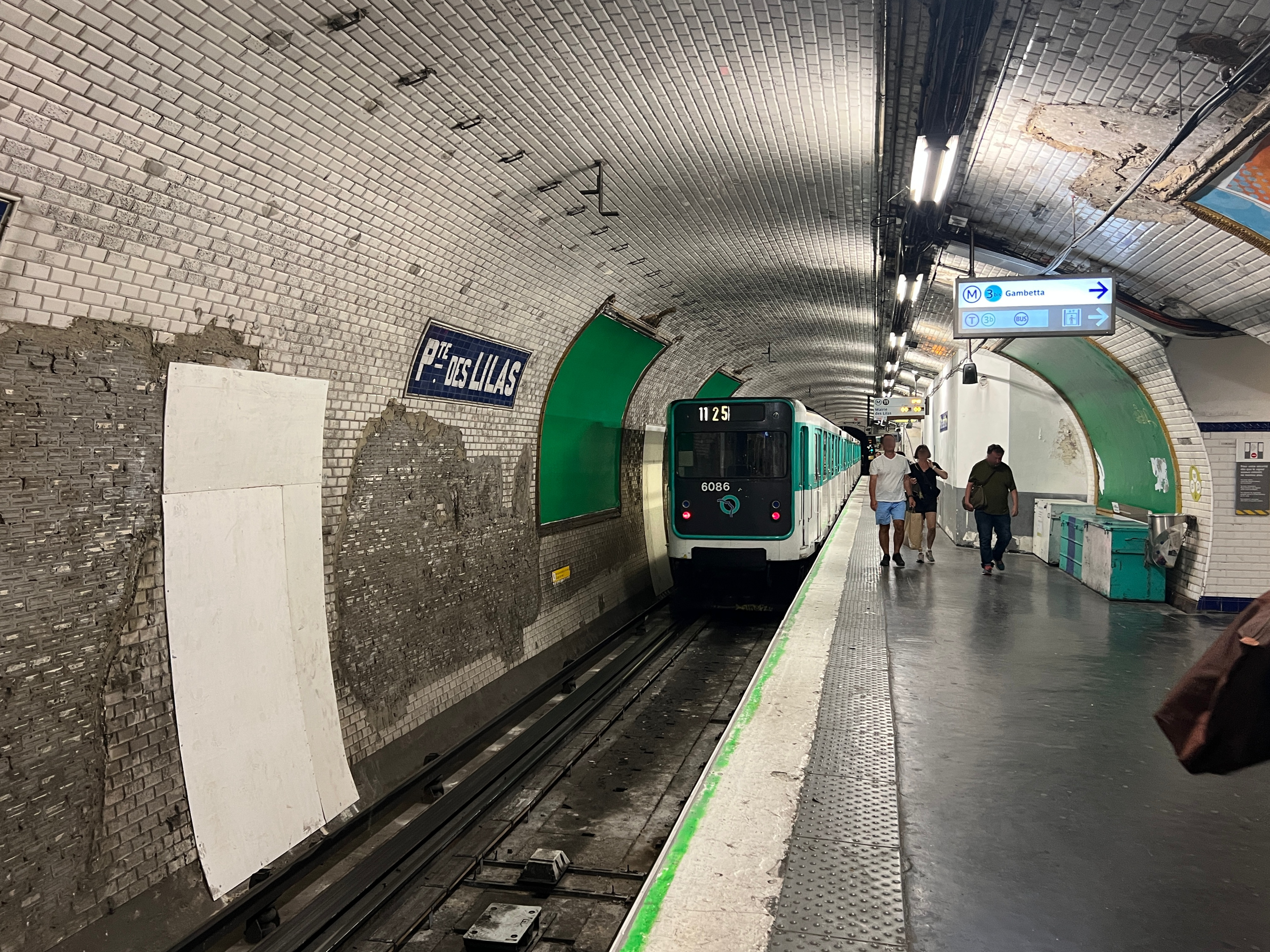
Line 11's platforms towards Rosny-Bois-Perrier

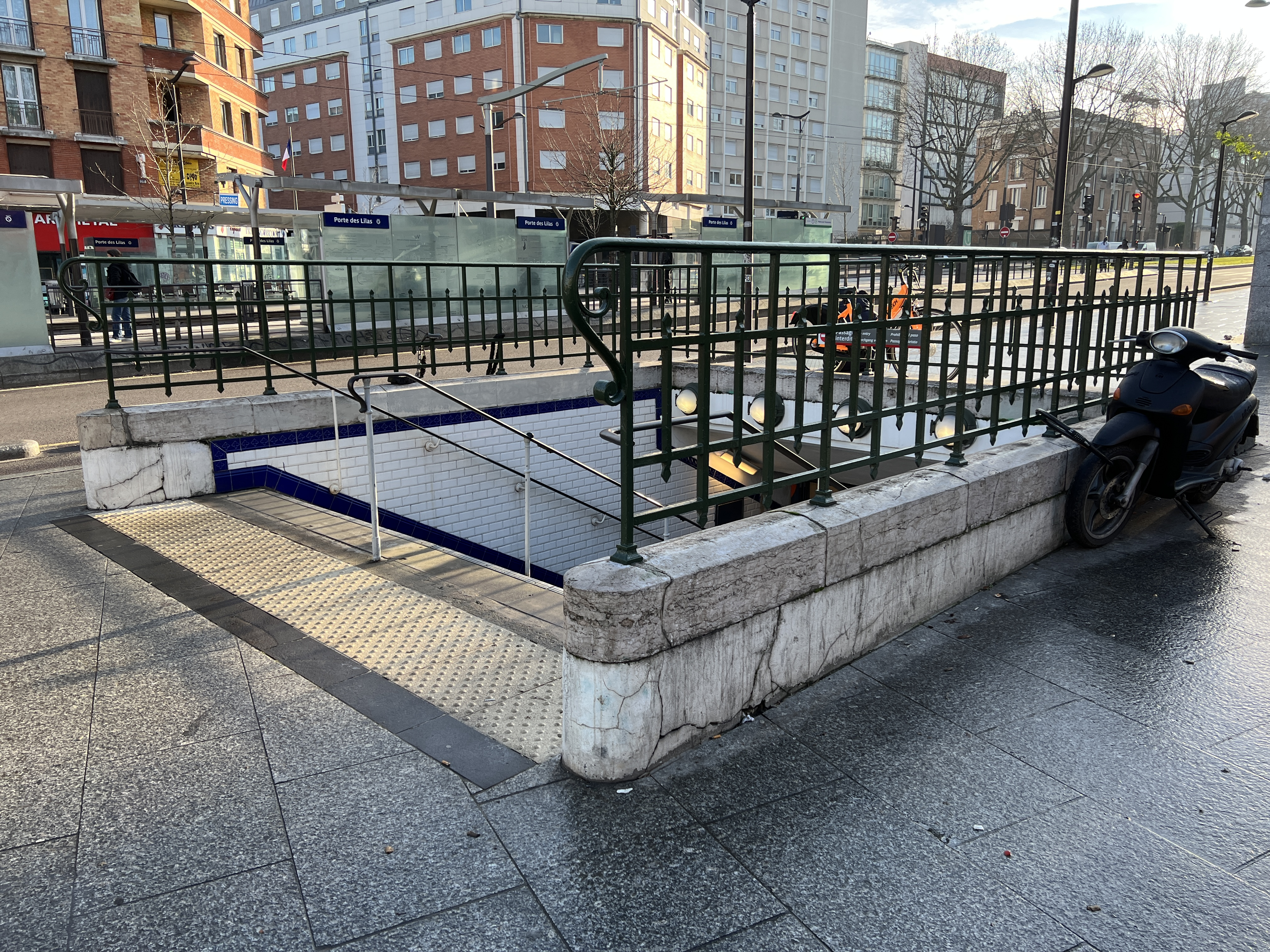
Entrance 2

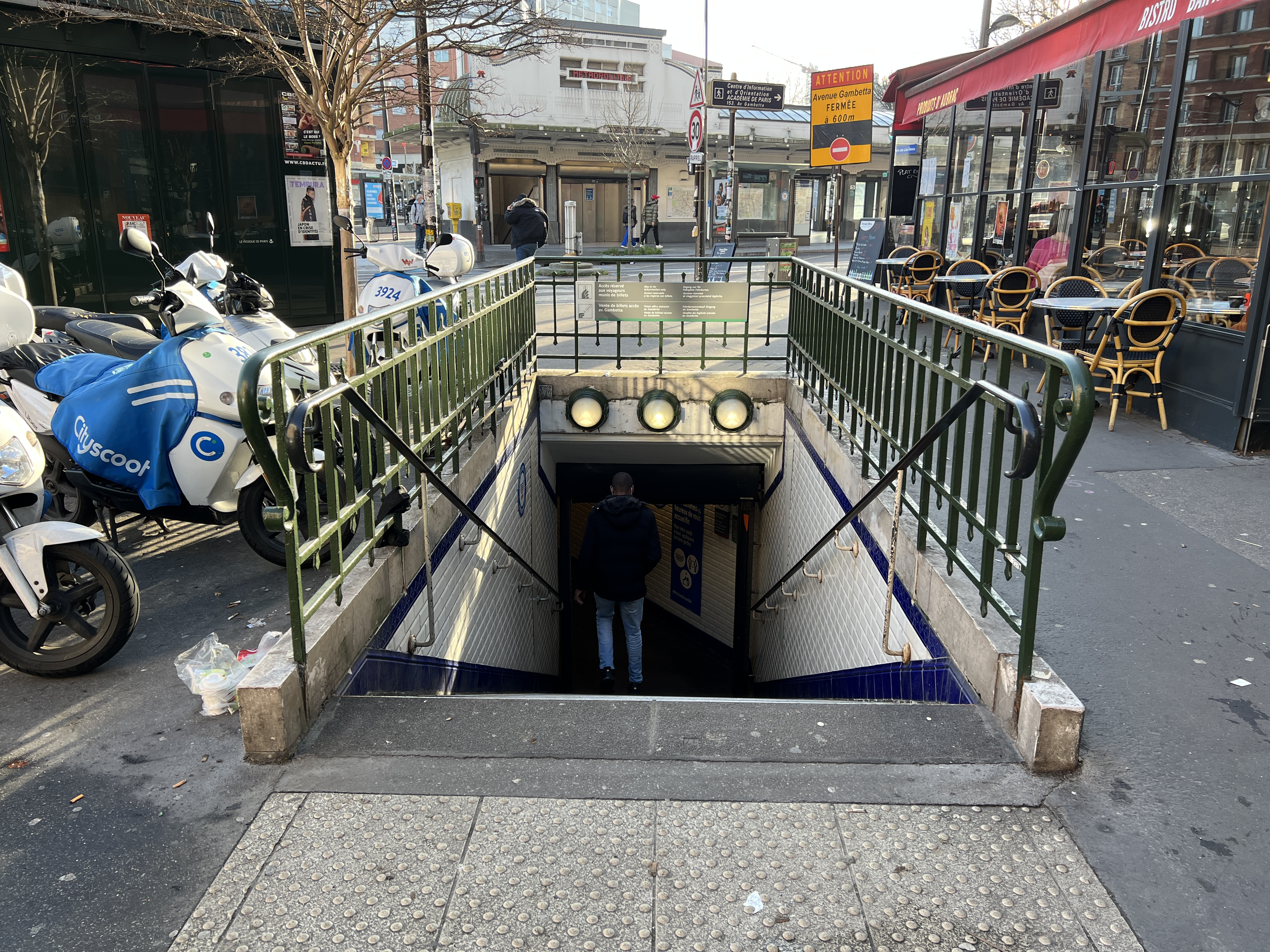
Entrance 3

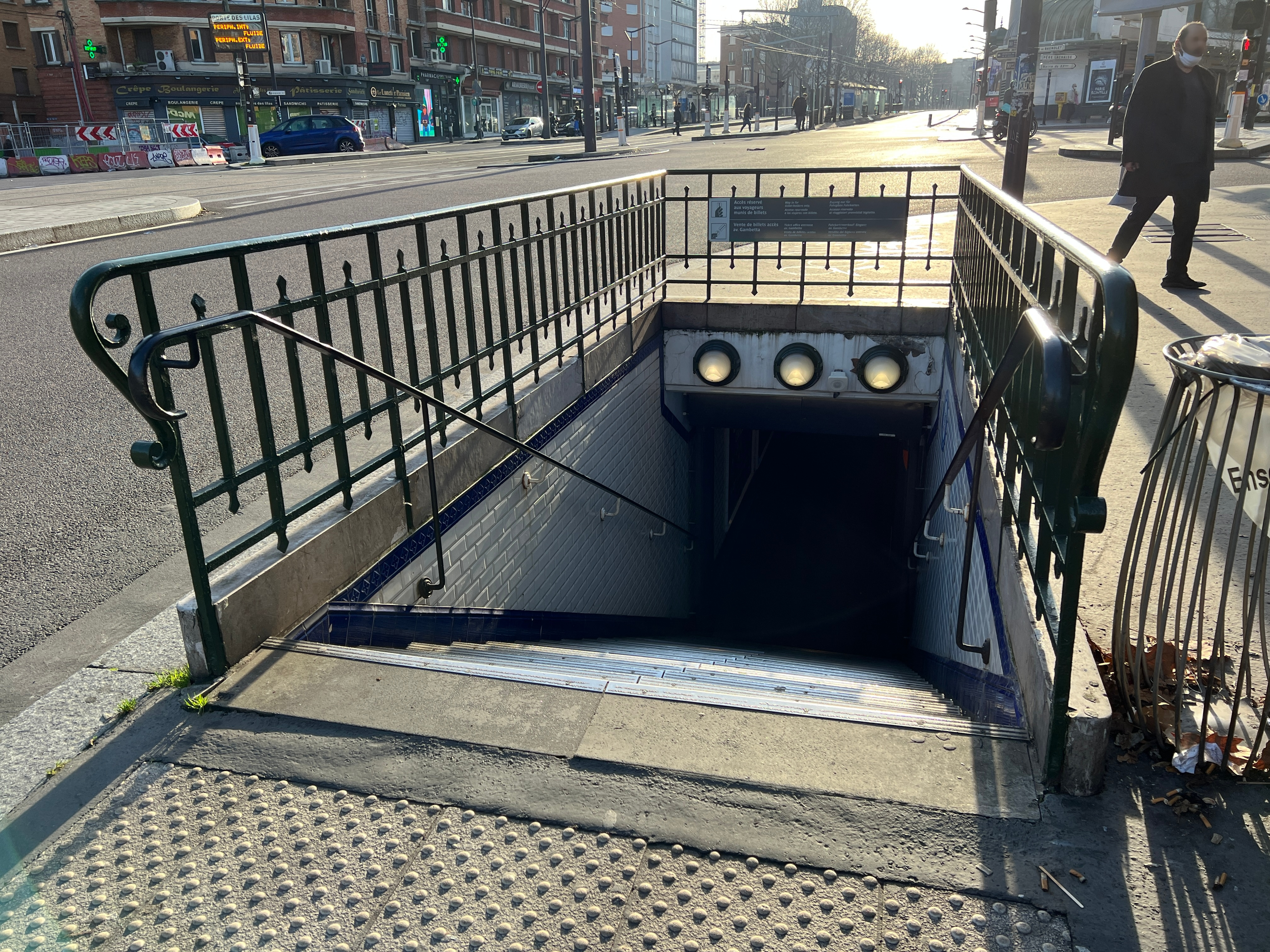
Entrance 4

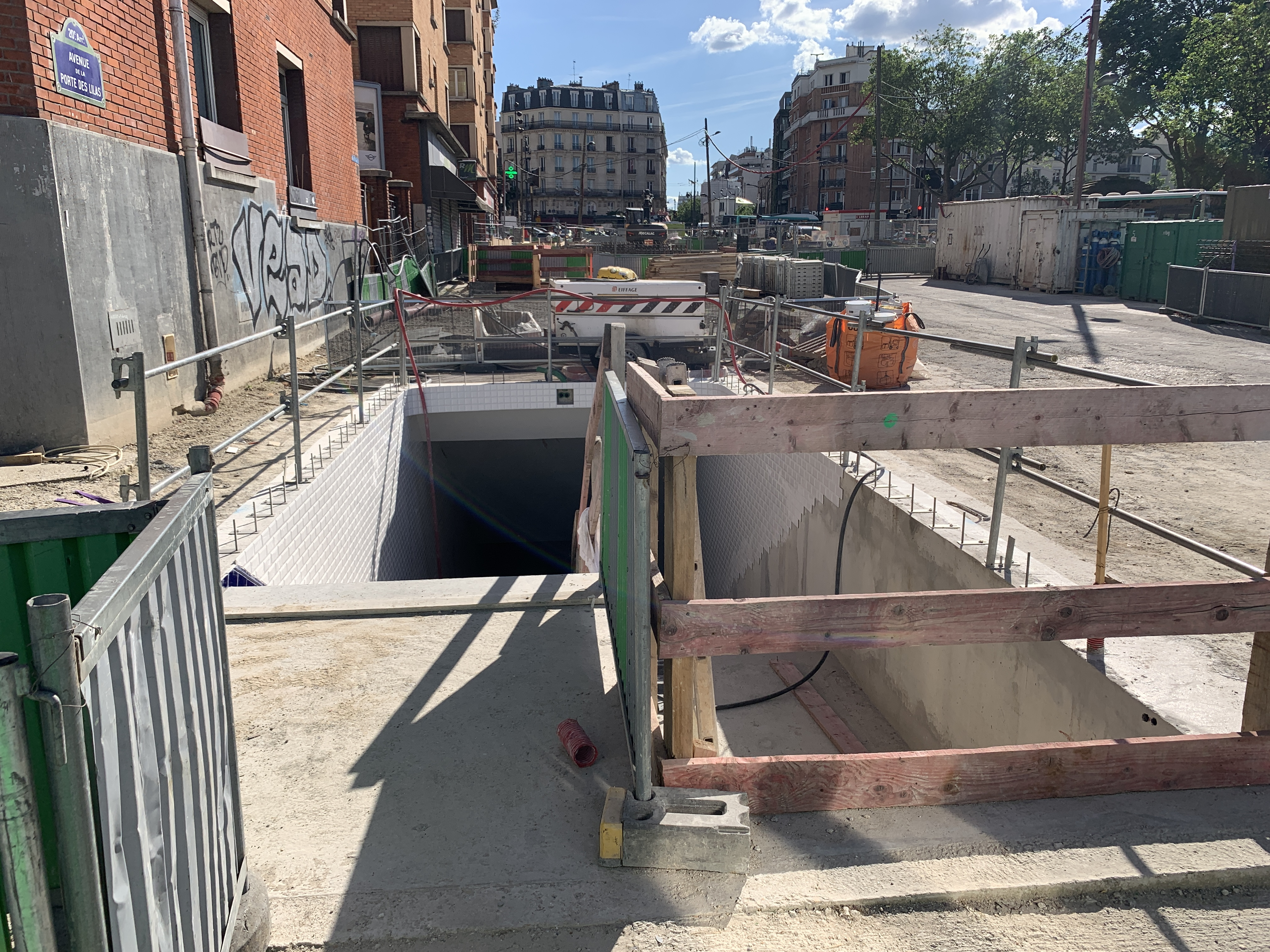
Construction of the new entrance (2021) along rue des Glaïeuls

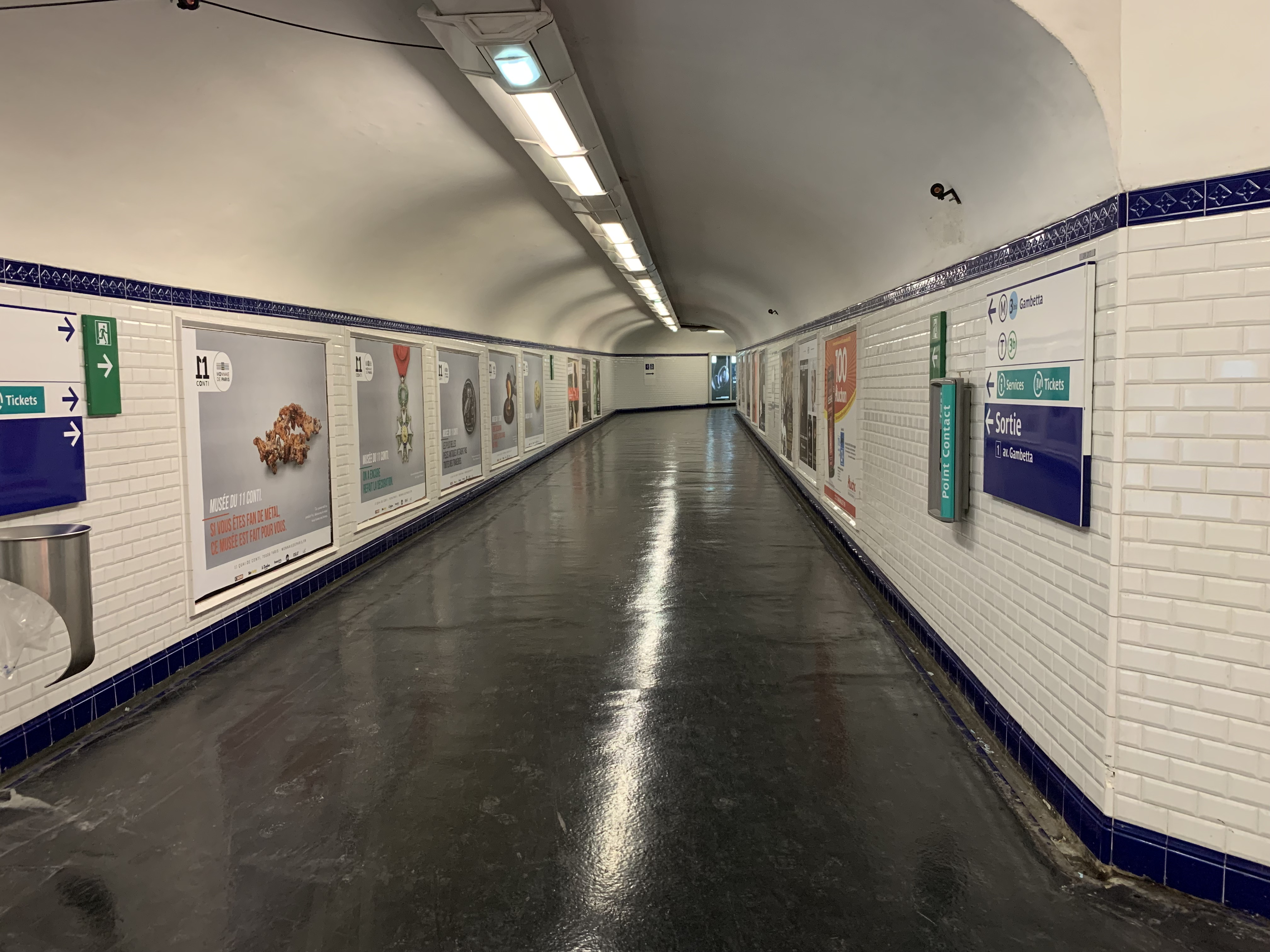
Corridors in the station
