= Paris Metro Line 3 =

Subway route in the French capital

Line 3
- Paris Metro Line 3
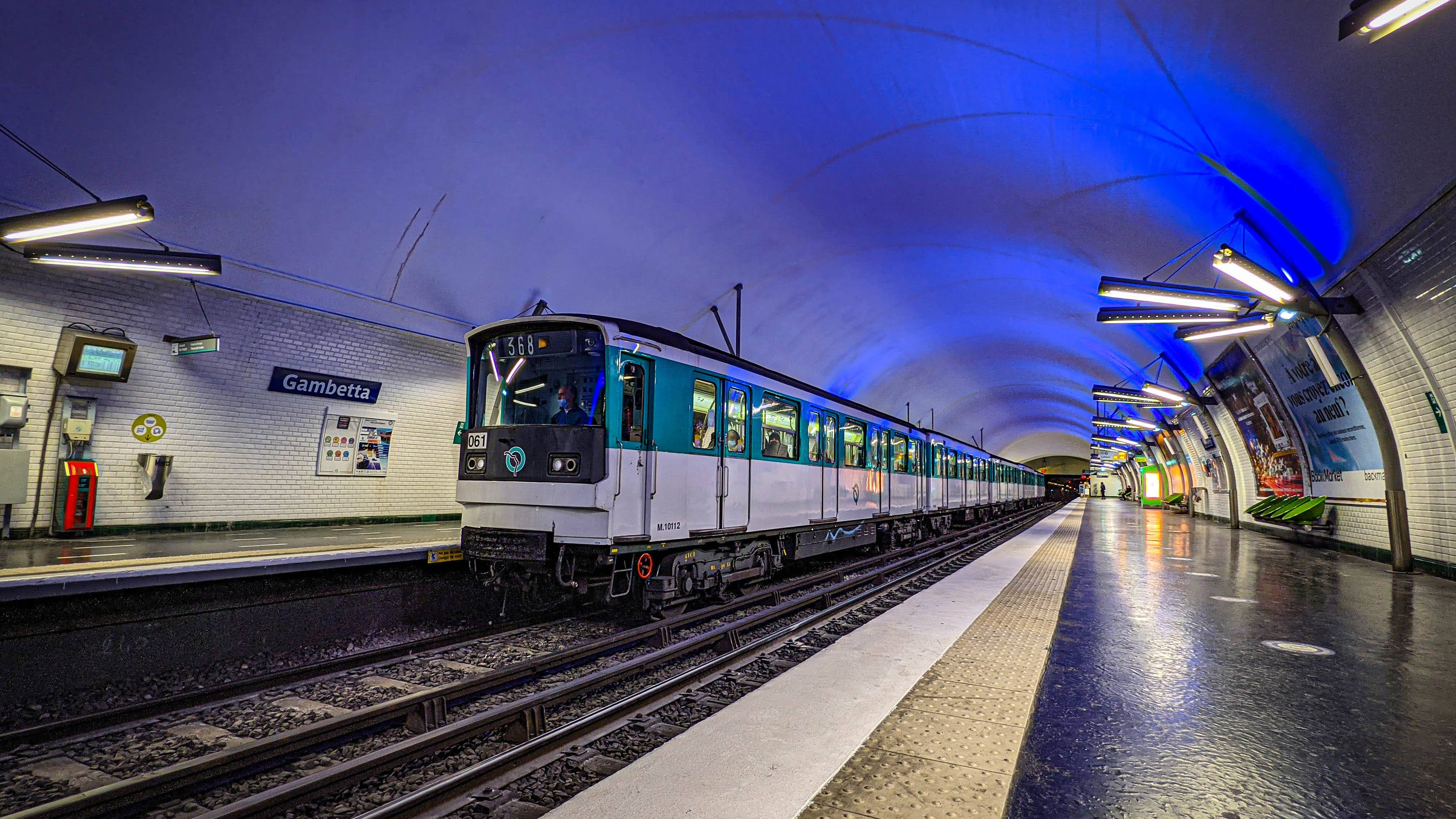
- MF 67 at Gambetta station

Overview
- Locale: Levallois-Perret, Paris, Bagnolet
- Termini: Pont de Levallois–Bécon; Gallieni
- Connecting lines: Paris Metro Paris Metro Line 2 Paris Metro Line 3bis Paris Metro Line 4 Paris Metro Line 5 Paris Metro Line 7 Paris Metro Line 8 Paris Metro Line 9 Paris Metro Line 11 Paris Metro Line 12 Paris Metro Line 13 Paris Metro Line 14 RER RER A RER C RER E Transilien Transilien Line J (Paris-Saint-Lazare) Transilien Line L (Paris-Saint-Lazare) Tramways in Île-de-France Île-de-France tramway Line 3b
- Stations: 25

Service
- System: Paris Métro
- Operator: RATP
- Rolling stock: MF 67 (47 trains as of 31 July 2023)
- Ridership: 80 million (avg. per year); 12th/16 (2025)

History
- Opened: 19 October 1904; 122 years ago

Technical
- Line length: 11.665 km (7.248 mi)
- Track gauge: 1,435 mm (4 ft 8 1/2 in) standard gauge
- Electrification: 750 V DC third rail
- Conduction system: Conductor (OCTYS)
- Average inter-station distance: 486 m (1,594 ft)

Paris Metro Line 3 (French: Ligne 3 du métro de Paris) is one of the sixteen currently open lines of the Paris Métro. It connects Pont de Levallois–Bécon station in the near northwestern suburban city of Levallois-Perret to Gallieni, in the eastern suburban city of Bagnolet. After opening as the network's third line in 1904, it was subject to several extensions, including the major restructuring occurring of 1971, where the line switched its easternmost section from Porte des Lilas to Gallieni, the abandoned section becoming Line 3bis.

With a length of 11.7 km (7 mi), Line 3 crosses Paris from west to east completely on the Rive Droite, serving the residential areas of the 17th arrondissement, the Gare Saint-Lazare, important stores and shopping centres, the Opéra Garnier, the former Parisian stock exchange house, the Place de la République, and the Père Lachaise graveyard. In 2017, it carried 101.4 million riders, making it the tenth busiest line of the Métro network.

== History ==
=== Chronology ===
- 10 October 1904: The first portion of Line 3 was opened between Père Lachaise cemetery and Villiers. Work took longer than expected because of existing infrastructure.
- 25 January 1905: The line was extended in the east from Père Lachaise to Gambetta.
- 23 May 1910: The line was extended westbound from Villiers to Pereire.
- 15 February 1911: The line was extended from Pereire to Porte de Champerret.
- 27 November 1921: The line was extended eastbound from Gambetta to Porte des Lilas.
- 24 September 1937: The line was extended from Porte de Champerret to Pont de Levallois.
- 1967: Line 3 was the first Métro line to receive new MF 67 rolling stock. It still uses this stock today, which was refurbished in the 2000s.
- 23 August 1969: Gambetta station is remodeled, absorbing nearby Martin Nadaud station.
- 27 March 1971: The branch between the original Gambetta station and Porte des Lilas was separated from the line to become the independent Line 3bis.
- 2 April 1971: The line was extended from Gambetta to Gallieni.

=== A second east–west axis ===
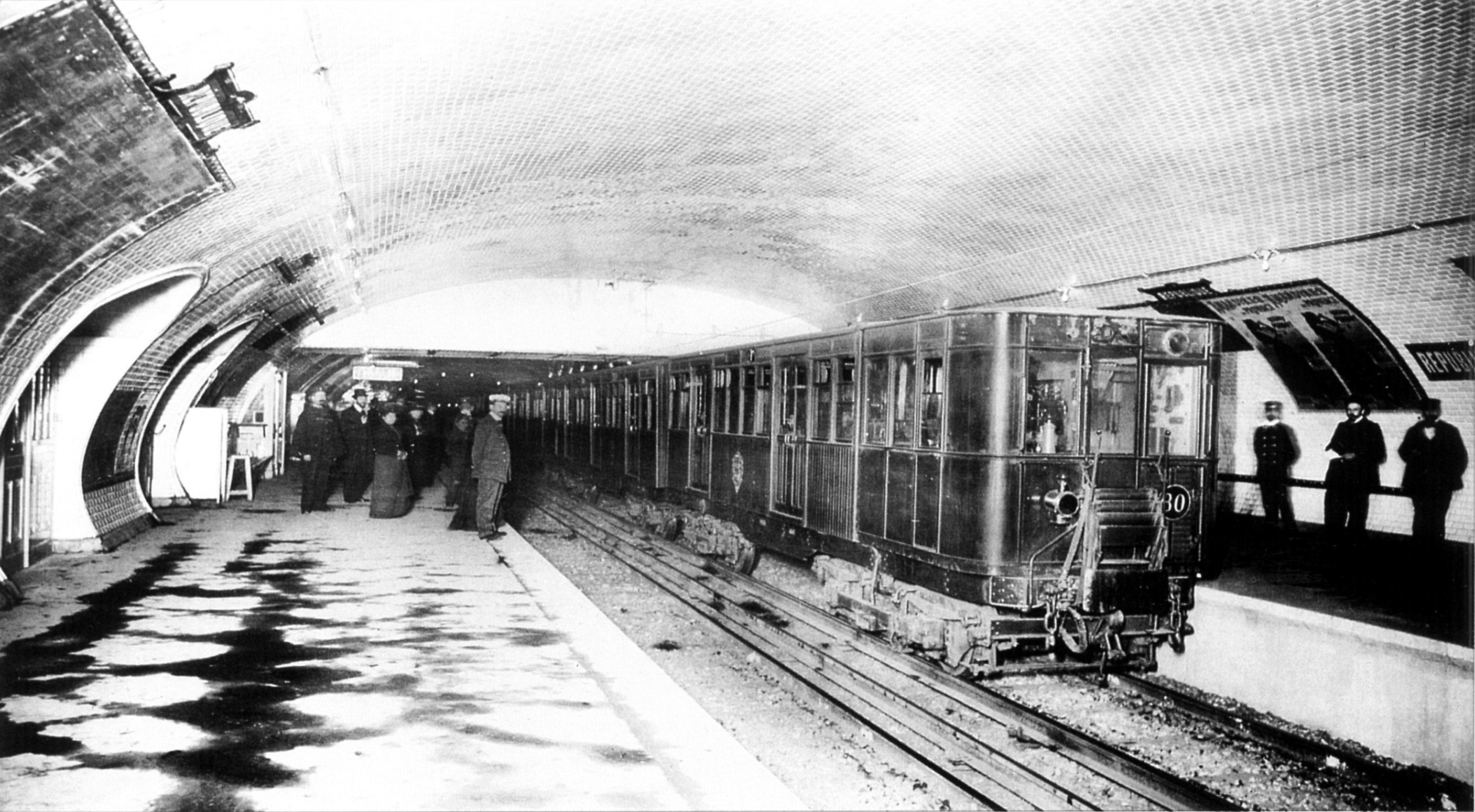
A 300-series Thomson at République in 1904

The infrastructure works for Line 3 were auctioned off in six sections on 24 May 1902. The concession was granted to the CMP by the municipal government of Paris on 13 March 1903, but the declaration of public utility was only granted on 26 February 1907.

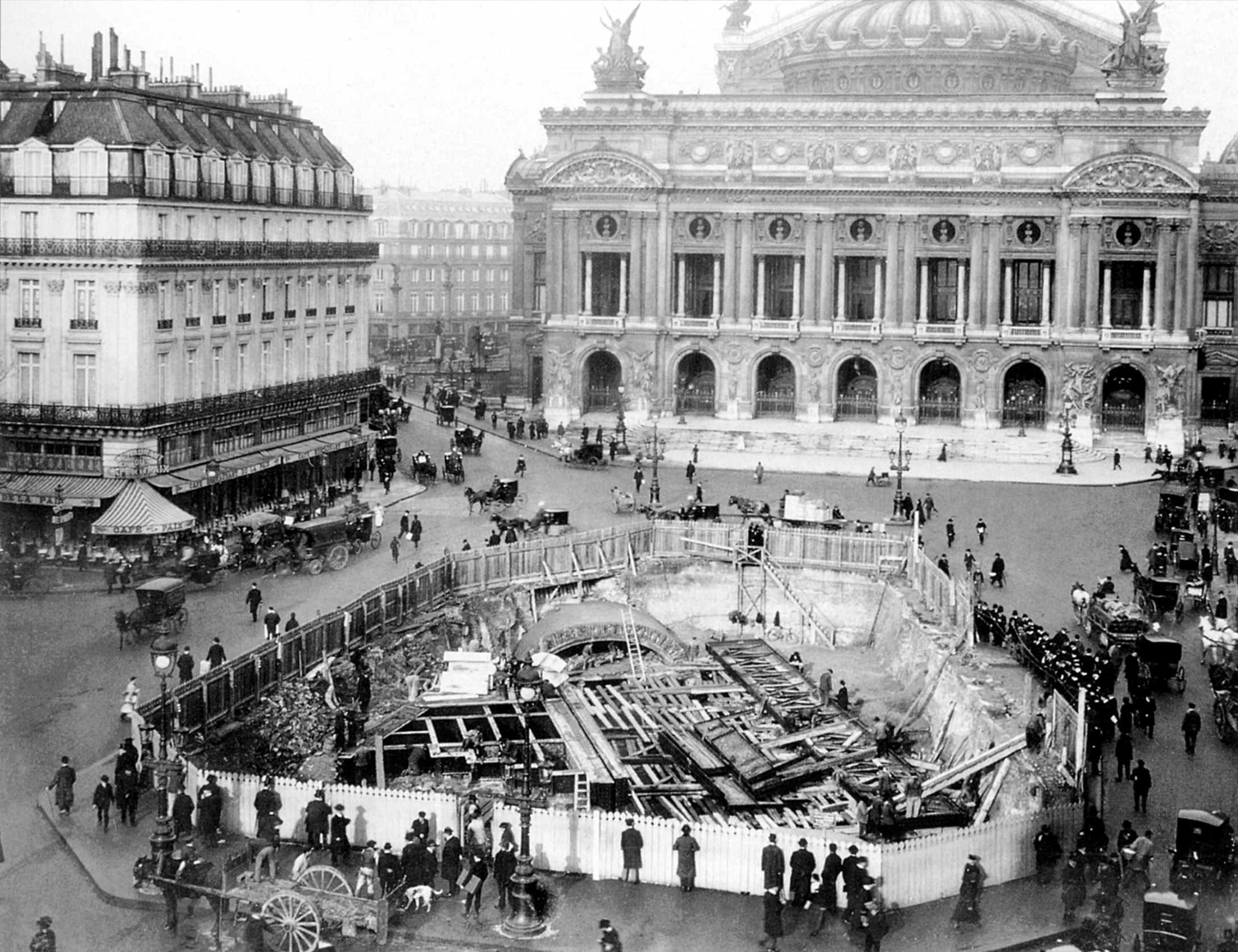
A display of Line 3's cut-and-cover construction technique at Opéra. The vault heading underneath Rue Auber is visible

The works were rendered difficult due to the necessary displacement of existing underground infrastructure such as water, gas, and electricity lines, but also because the Line 3 was to cross a number of Métro lines, particularly at Opéra, where a special pit was built to house the intersection of upcoming lines 7 and 8, both already part of the Bienvenüe project. This masonry pit was 20 m (66 ft) and constructed fully so as to avoid any problems when building subsequent lines. Since the work was situated at the water table, it required concrete pillars made by sinking caissons with compressed air. The work lasted eleven months, from March 1903 to February 1904.

Another difficult point of construction was the crossing of the Canal Saint-Martin, which required drying the canal and suspending its vault. In the area of the Place Gambetta, the subsoil, which consisted of waterlogged sand balls, required drainage : A very delicate operation considering the number of buildings that could be destabilised. The side walls were then built from masonry shafts that are dark from the outside.

=== Future plans ===
Although no concrete extension plans currently exist for Line 3 itself, Line 3bis may be merged with Line 7bis to form a new line, possibly named Line 20, which Line 3 would then connect to at Gambetta. A western extension of Line 3 to Bécon-les-Bruyères has also been proposed, but isn't included in future projects backed by Ile de France Mobilités.

== Map and stations ==

=== Renamed stations ===
- 15 October 1907: Rue St-Denis renamed Réaumur-Sébastopol.
- 1926: Caumartin renamed Havre-Caumartin
- 1 May 1946: Vallier renamed Louise Michel, the leader of La Commune.
- September 1998: Saint-Maur is renamed Rue Saint-Maur in order to avoid confusion with the suburban city of Saint-Maur-les-Fossés.

== Facts ==
- Due to connections with other adjacent stations, it is possible to walk between three stations on the line without heading to the surface. This is done by starting at Saint-Lazare (Métro 3, 12, 13 and 14), then transferring to Hausmann Saint-Lazare (RER E), from there going to Havre – Caumartin (Métro 3 and 9) then connecting to Auber (RER A) and finally walking from there to Opéra (Métro 3, 7 and 8). The journey can also be made the other way around (Opéra to Saint-Lazare).
- The line was the first to receive the MF 67 trains back in 1967 and will be the last one to retire them, around 2033.
- Line 3 has the only MF 67 trains that include light-up line panels. This addition, included in the refurbishment of the 2000s, was never ported on the rolling stock of other lines.
- Line 3 hasn’t changed its rolling stock for more than 50 years, more than any other line in the system.
- By the time of their retirement, the MF 67 trains will have served the line continuously for 65 years, rivaling the longevity of the Sprague-Thomson trains which ran from 1908 to the late 70s particularly on lines 2 and 5.

== Tourism ==
Line 3 passes near several places of interest:

- St-Lazare railway station.
- The Opera Garnier.
- The Bourse (Paris Stock Exchange).
- The area of the Sentier.
- Place de la République.
- Père Lachaise Cemetery.

== Gallery ==
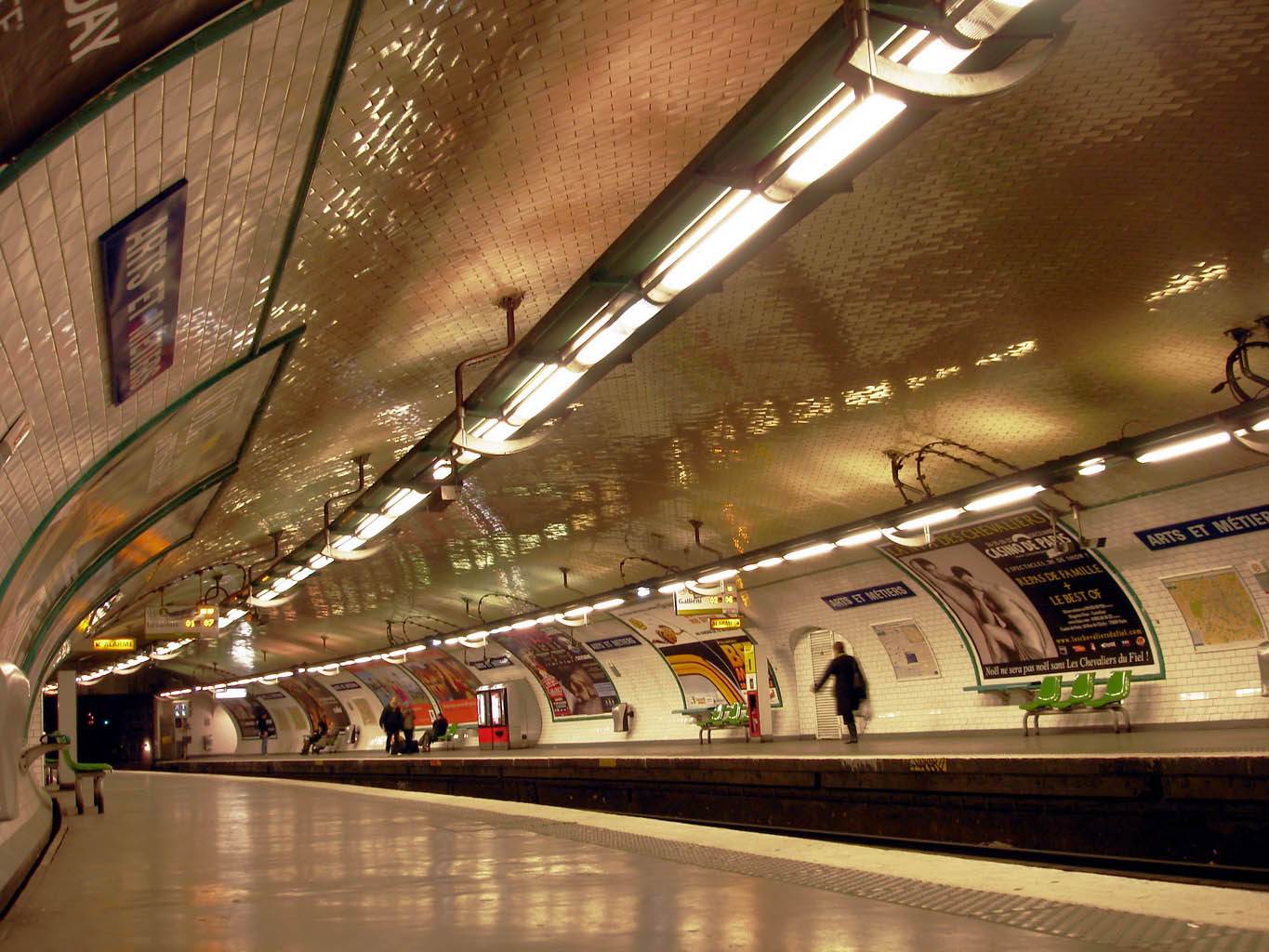
Arts et Métiers

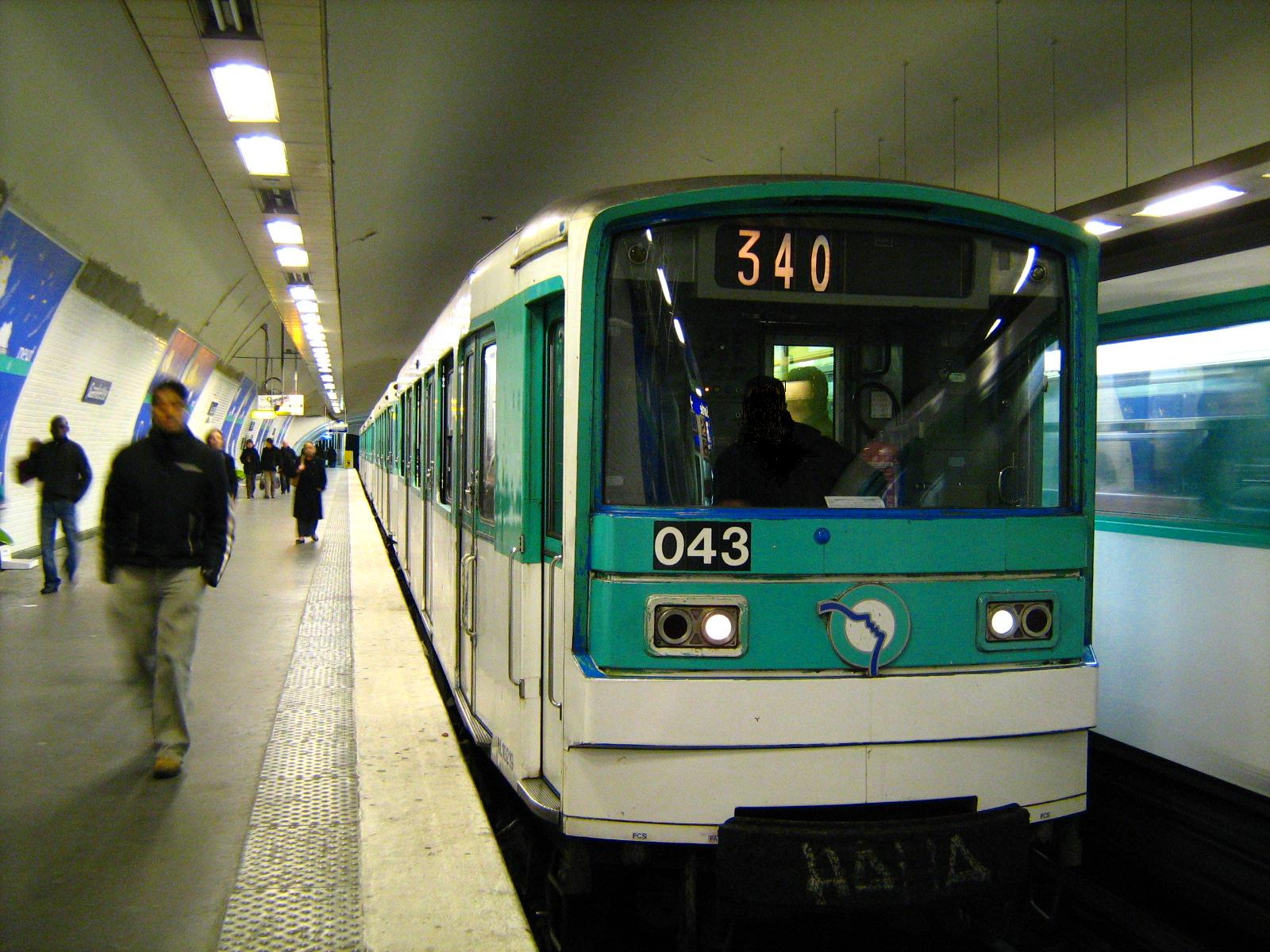
Gambetta

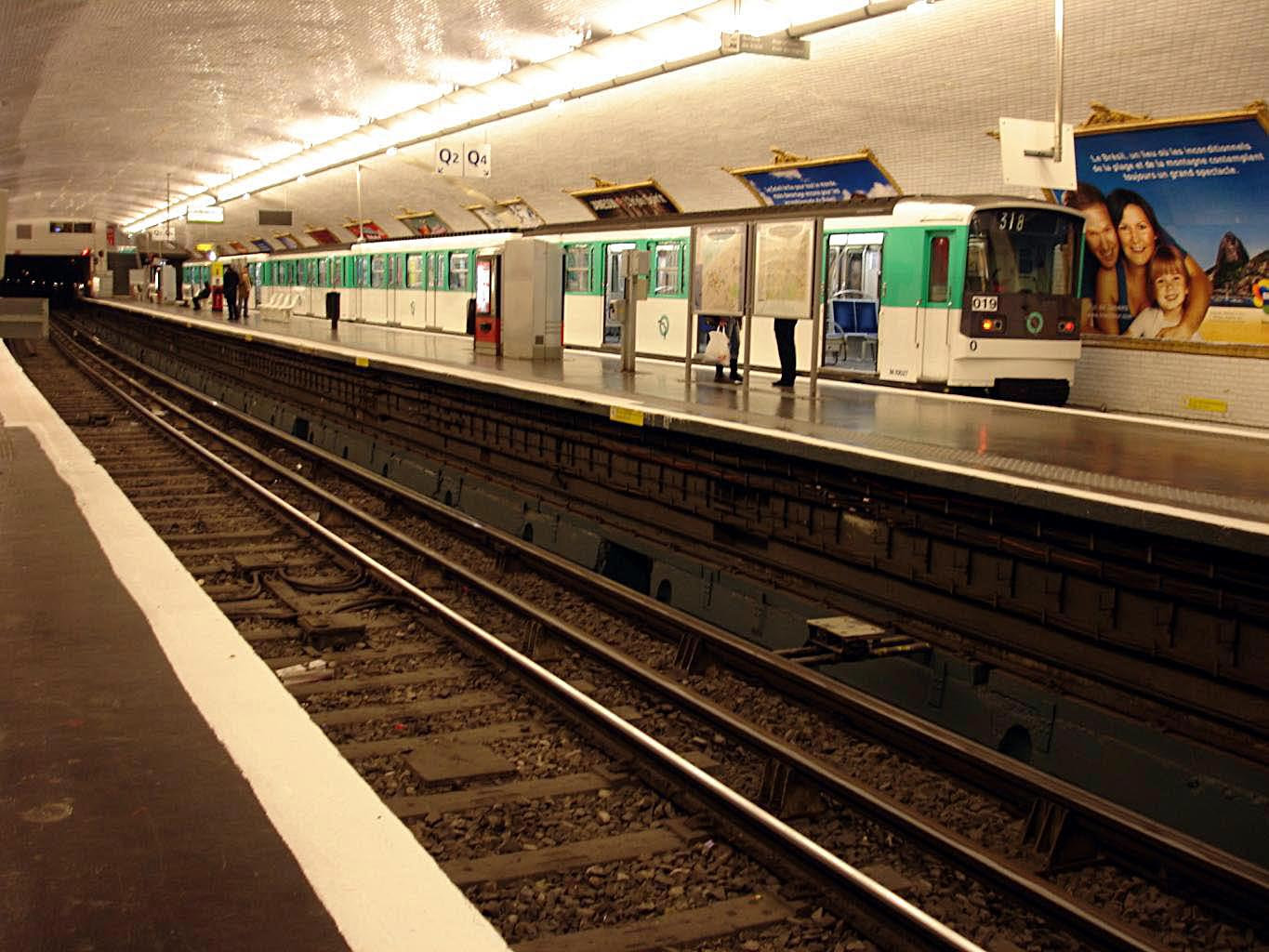
Pont de Levallois

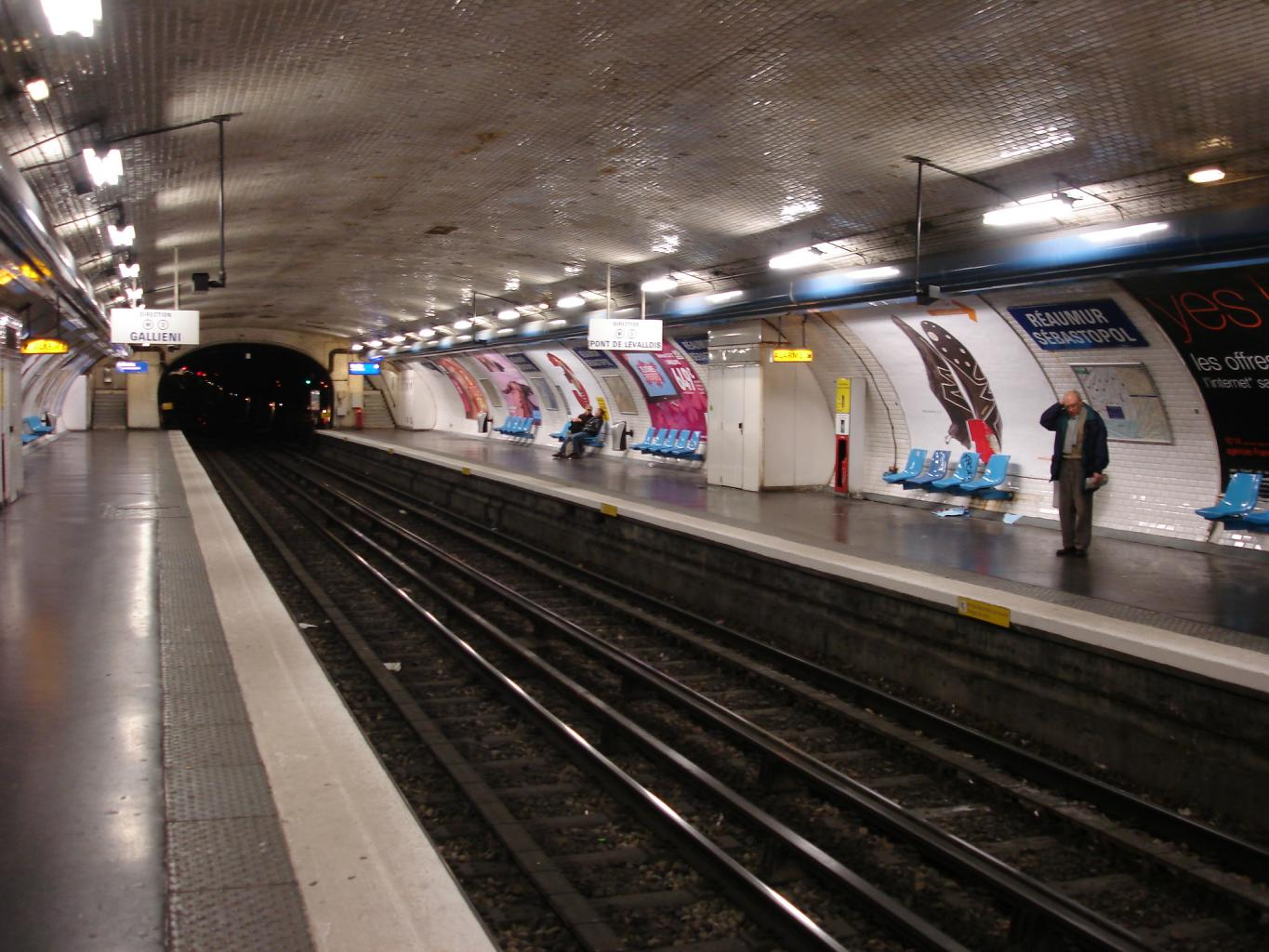
Réaumur–Sébastopol

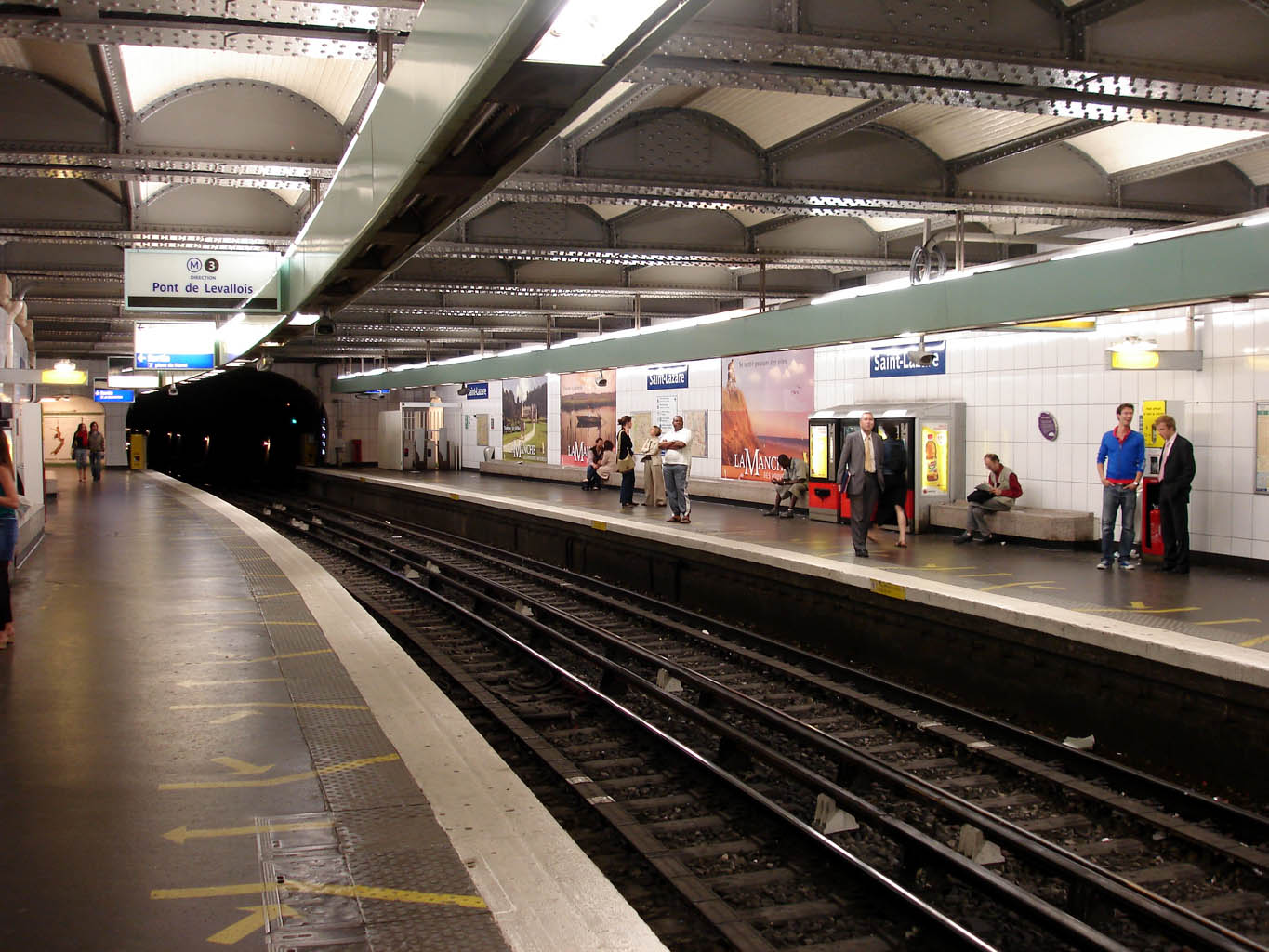
Saint-Lazare

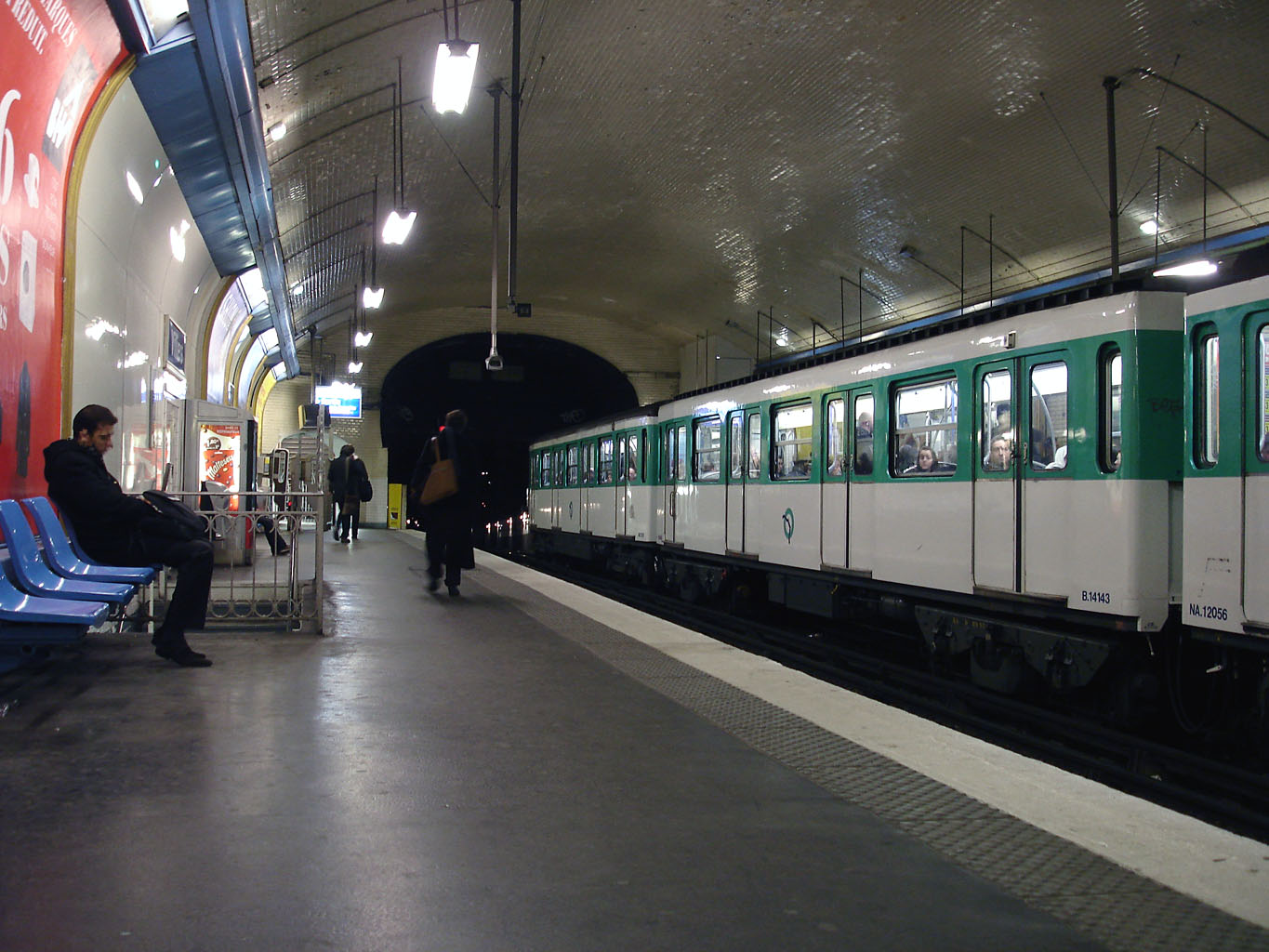
Villiers

== See also ==
- List of metro systems
- List of Paris Métro stations
- Rail transport in France
- Transport in Paris
