= Voie des Fêtes and the voie navette of the Paris Metro =

Two single-track train tunnels in Paris

The layout of the voie navette and Voie des Fêtes between lines 3 bis and 7 bis.

The Voie des Fêtes and the voie navette of the Paris Métro are two single-track connecting tunnels between lines 3 bis at the Porte des Lilas station, and 7 bis at the Place des Fêtes and Pré-Saint-Gervais stations, in the 19th arrondissement of Paris.

The Voie des Fêtes takes its name from the station where it originates and it is on this track that the Haxo ghost station is located.

The Voie navette takes its name from a shuttle that ran between the termini of lines 3 and 7 (now 3 bis and 7 bis) from 1921 to 1939. During the 1950s, it served as a testing ground for the RATP, notably for the first tests of automatic piloting in 1951, and then for the world's first rubber-tired metro prototype, the MP 51, from 1952 to 1956.

== Layout ==
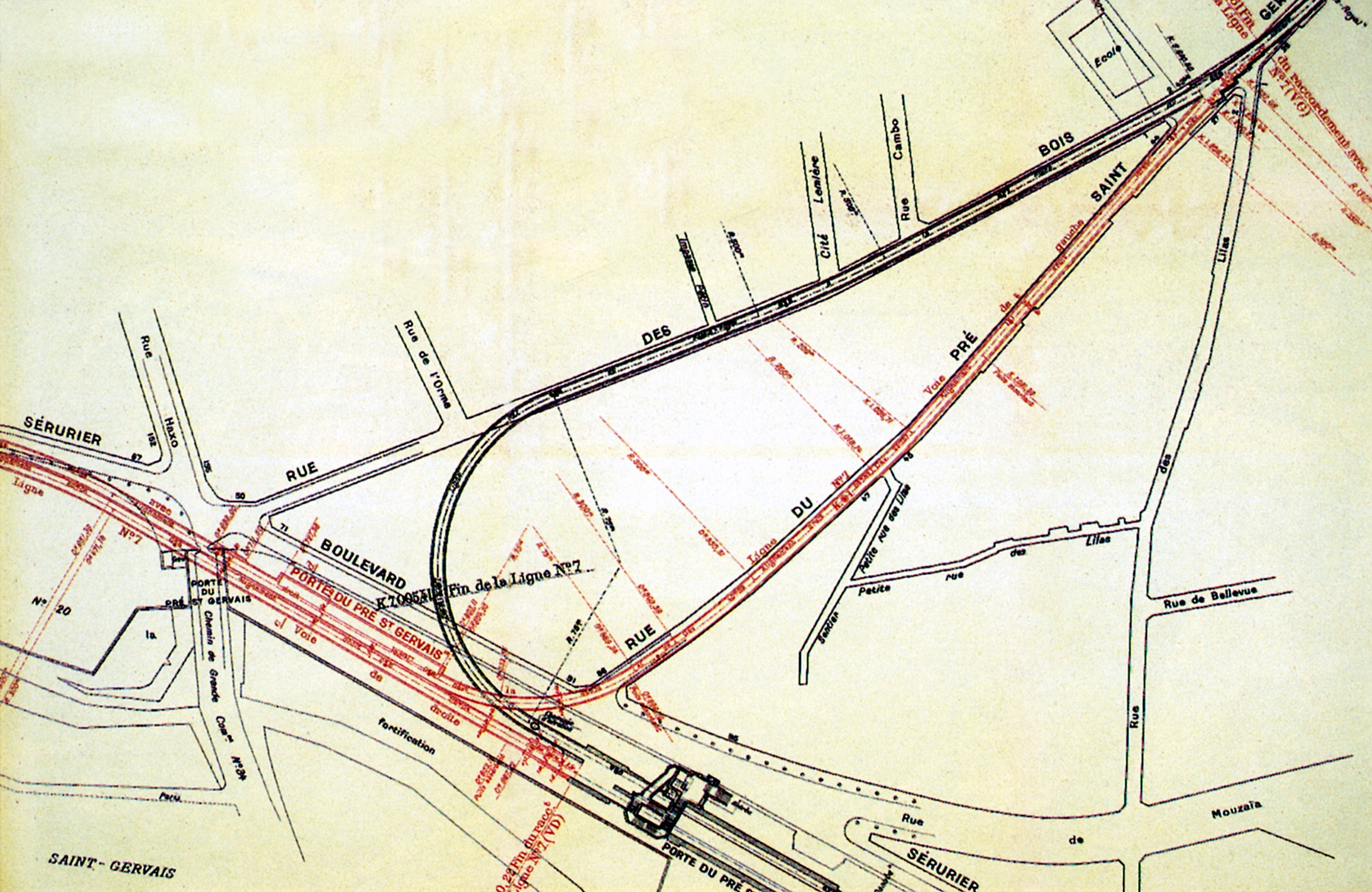
Plan of the connection between lines 3 bis and 7 bis. In black, the single-track tunnel of the current line 7 bis between Place des Fêtes (top) and Pré-Saint-Gervais (bottom). In red, the voie des Fêtes, with Haxo station, and below, the voie navette.

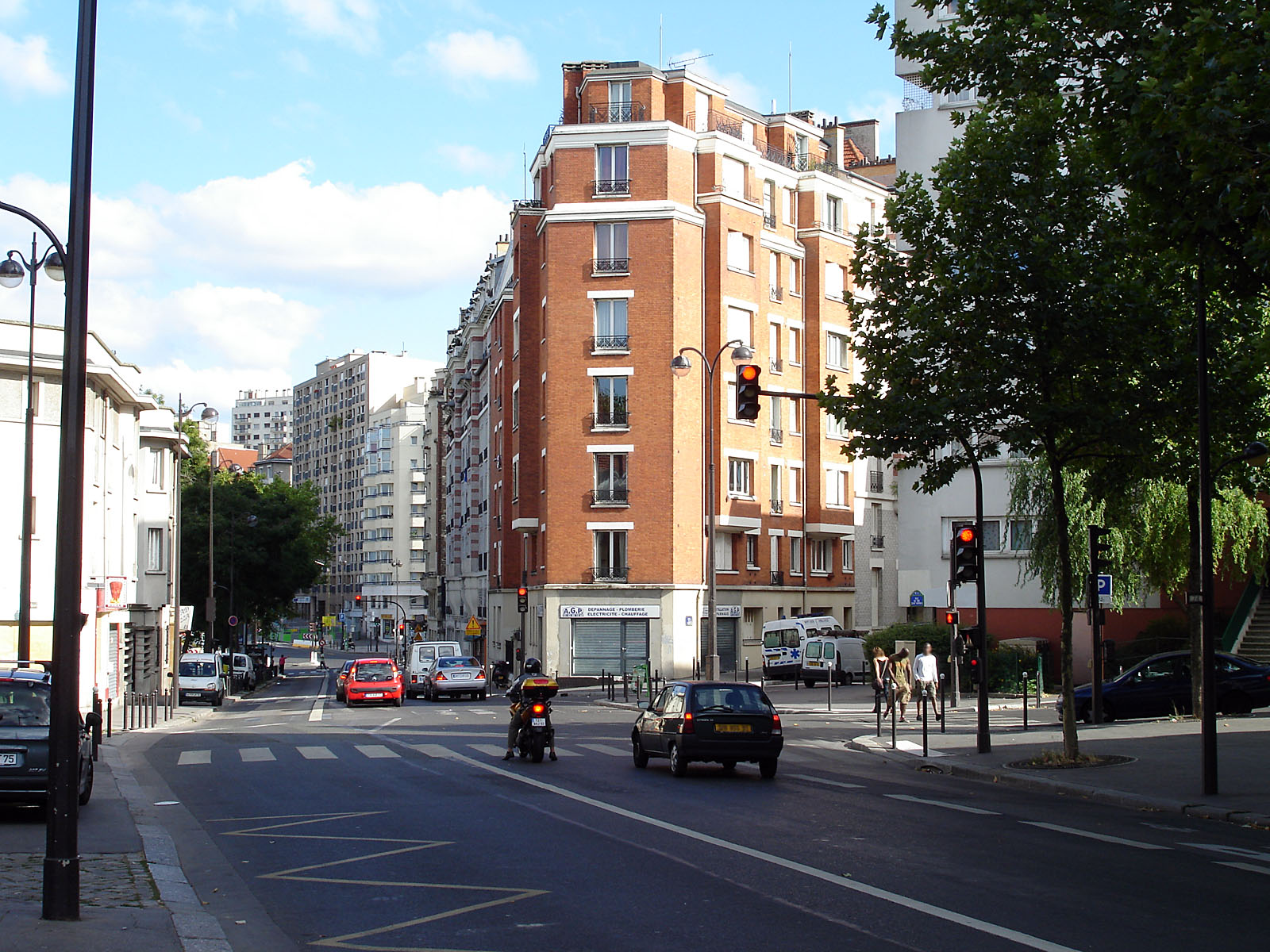
Boulevard Sérurier, as viewed from the south. Below this section is the "ghost" Haxo metro station, on the voie des Fêtes.

The Voie des Fêtes breaks away shortly after the Place des Fêtes station on line 7 bis and runs under the rue du Pré-Saint-Gervais. After a curve to the southeast, it passes under the line 7 bis. It runs under Boulevard Sérurier, one of the Boulevards des Maréchaux in the east of the capital, then serves the ghostly Haxo station. It then joins the voie navette before serving the Porte des Lilas - Cinéma, a two-track station flanked by two side platforms.

With a length of 770 meters, the voie navette runs entirely under the Boulevard Sérurier. Also, with a difficult long, and flat profile, it has a tight curve with a radius of seventy-five meters and a ramp of 40 ‰ over three hundred meters.

From the exit of the Porte des Lilas - Cinéma station, the two tracks merge into a short single track that connects to line 3 bis, on the track towards Gambetta.

== History ==
=== Timeline ===
- 27 November 1921: inauguration of the Gambetta - Porte des Lilas section of line 3 and of the shuttle service between lines 3 and 7.
- 3 September 1939: end of the shuttle service.
- 13 April 1952 to 31 May 1956: Experiments with the MP 51.

=== Linking lines 3 and 7 ===
In its deliberations of 14 June 1901, the Paris City Council expressed the wish to study a network complementary to the first lines built, so that, in principle, no part of the city would be more than four hundred meters from a metro station.

Fulgence Bienvenüe's project, presented on 4 December 1901, proposed several new lines and extensions, including line 3 from Gambetta to Porte de Romainville (Porte des Lilas). In addition to the terminus of line 3, a second station was built from which a double-track tunnel extended by two single-track tunnels connected to line 7 (now 7 bis), allowing the latter to operate to Porte des Lilas.

One of the two tracks connects to the Place des Fêtes station, the voie des Fêtes, with an intermediate one-way station, called Porte du Pré-Saint-Gervais in the project, since popularized as Haxo, just 100 m from the other station, also called Porte du Pré-Saint-Gervais in the project, and now Pré-Saint-Gervais. The other connects to the Pré-Saint-Gervais station, the voie navette. The planned extension, with the additional connection to line 7, is 2.157 kilometers long.

Work was nearing completion on the eve of the World War I, during which it continued at a slow pace. The section was handed over to the CMP on 23 February 1920, but the latter did not build the extension immediately: it was waiting for the city's commitment to pay the necessary funds in anticipation of the new 1920 agreement. Final work resumed in December 1920.

=== The navette ===
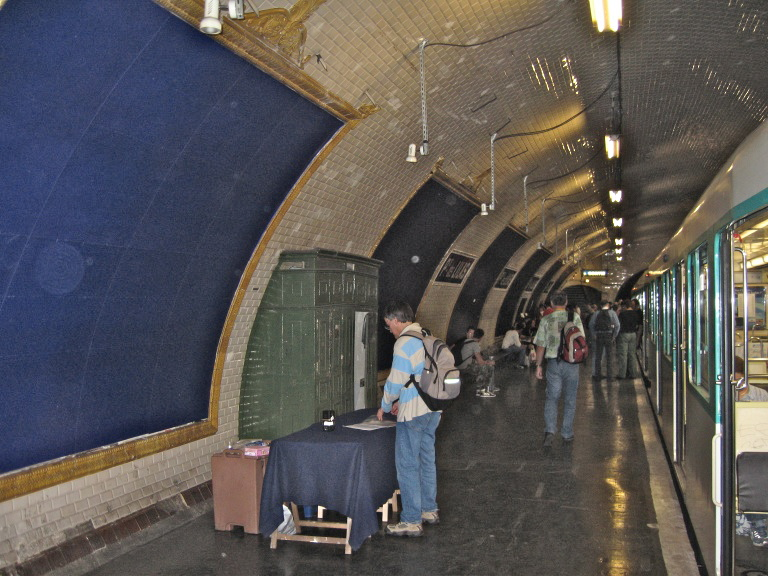
Porte des Lilas - Cinéma station

The idea of sending line 7 trains to Porte des Lilas was dropped from the original plans, as line 3 trains were more than sufficient for this service (line 11 did not exist then). However, to connect lines 3 and 7, a shuttle service was planned on the northern track of the line, now called the "voie navette", between Pré-Saint-Gervais and Porte des Lilas stations. The service would be operated with a single unit consisting of two 10.85-meter "little Sprague" power cars taken from line 2. The small capacity of this trainset was more than sufficient for the traffic to be handled.

The Voie des Fêtes and the Haxo station were rendered useless: the track was only used to park the trains of line 3, while the station was not completed and, in particular, had no access to the public highway.

The voie navette was inaugurated on 27 November 1921, with the extension of line 3, now line 3 bis. But this very short line ceased to operate with the introduction of the restricted service during the World War II, on 3 September 1939.

=== Experimenting with rubber-tired metro systems ===
After the war, the voie navette was not reopened for commercial service due to very low ridership. However, it was used for numerous RATP tests, including the first autopilot tests in 1951 and the world's first rubber-tired metro prototype, the MP 51, from 1952 to 1956.

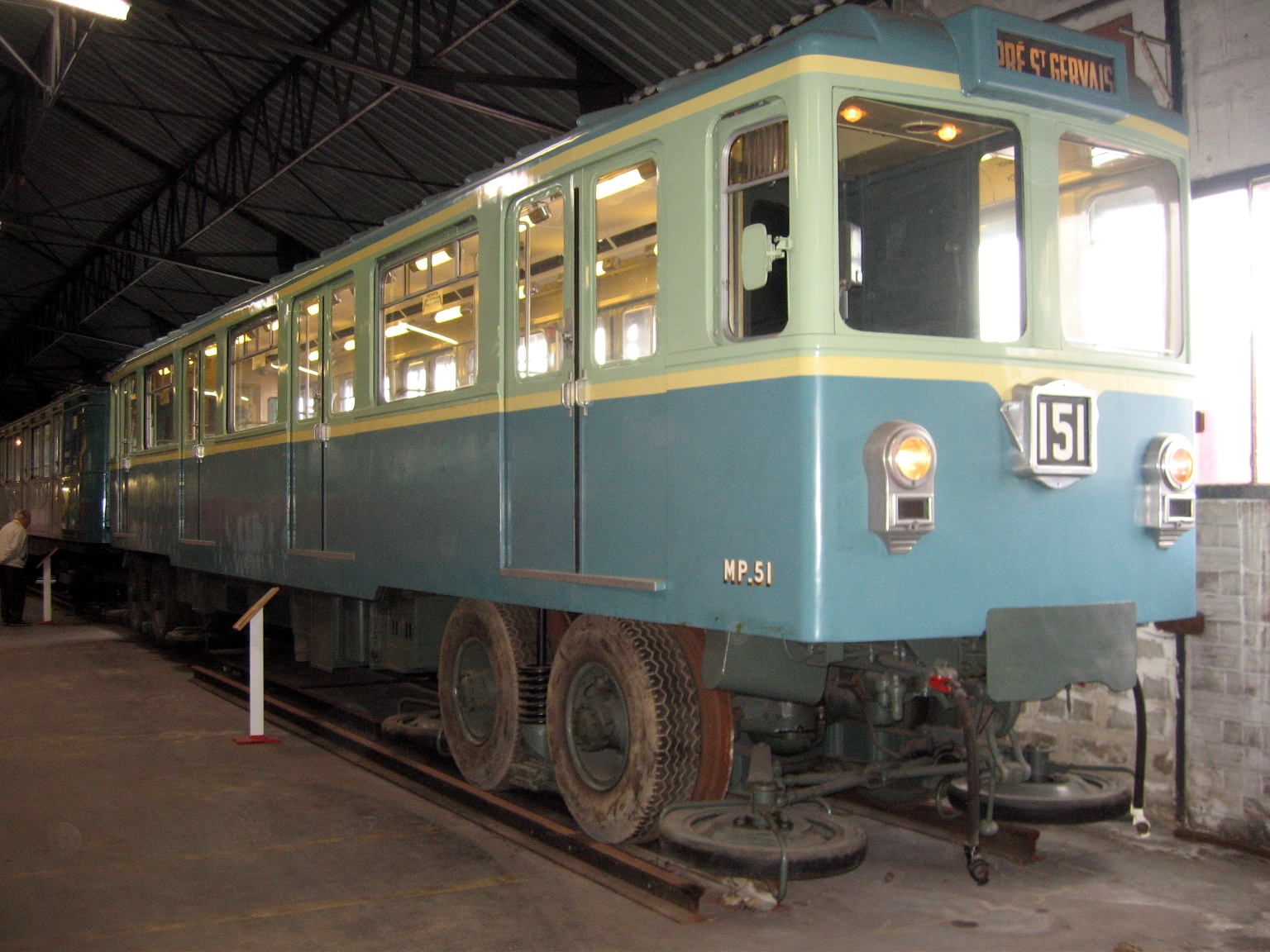
The MP 51 prototype, currently preserved in the Musée des Transports Urbains, Interurbains et Ruraux (Museum of Urban, Interurban and Rural Transport).

After the initial tests, the MP 51 appeared to the company's engineers to be completely reliable. As a result, it was used daily in passenger service on the voie navette from 1:30 p.m. to 7:30 p.m. from 13 April 1952 to 31 May 1956.

This was not a return to commercial service on this track, as service was suspended on days when the railcar was being overhauled. Traffic remains very low, consisting mainly of curious onlookers and schoolchildren. A passenger, often a child, is regularly invited to drive the metro: he or she engages the autopilot, which the RATP is also testing during these trials. Sensors are placed underneath the vehicle and receive a program sent by an alternating current spread by a wire placed on the track, drawing a Greek pattern with variable steps.

== Reconversion ==
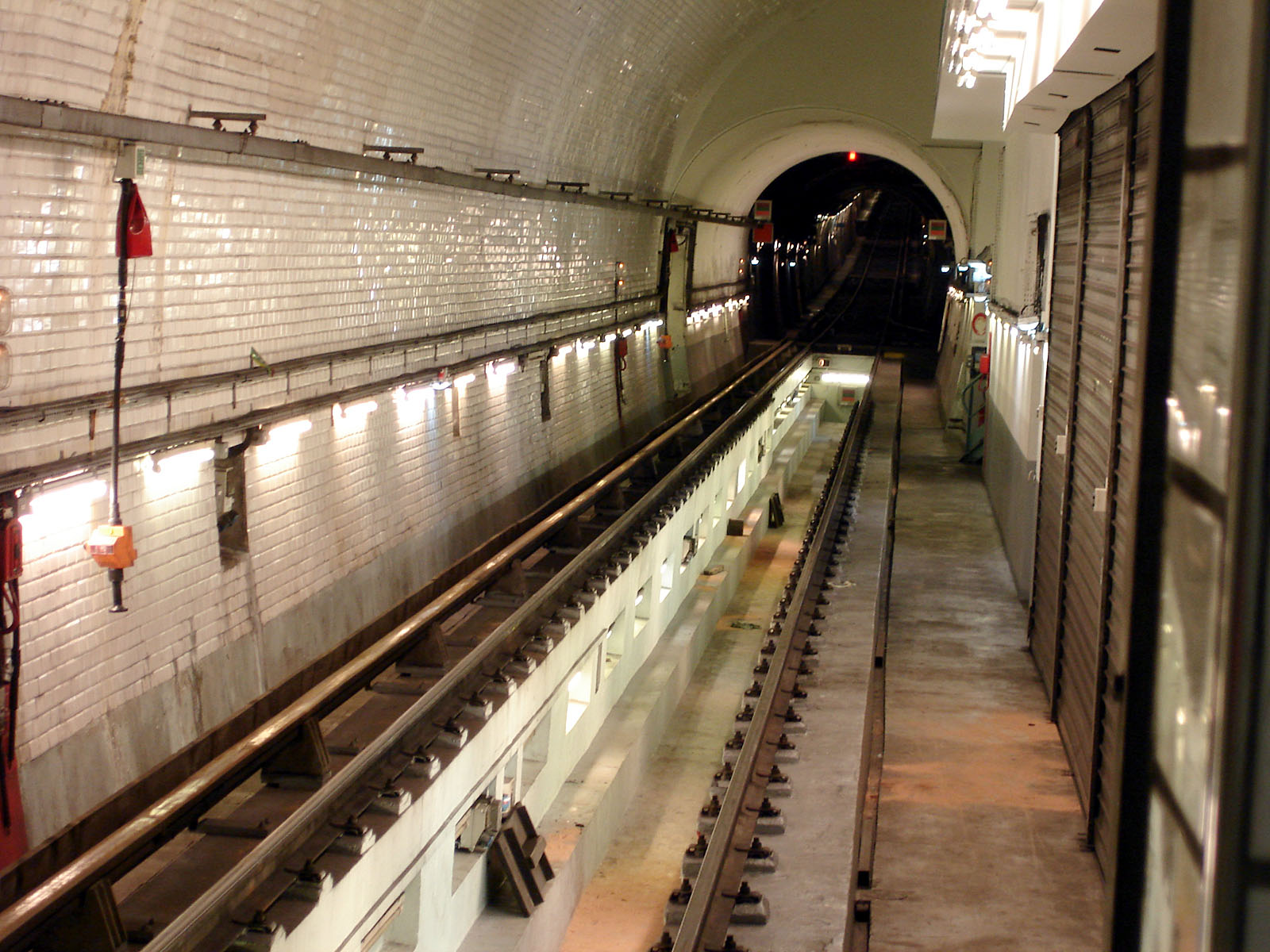
The voie navette leads north into the Pré-Saint-Gervais station, where a small workshop has been set up to maintain MF 88 equipment for line 7 bis.

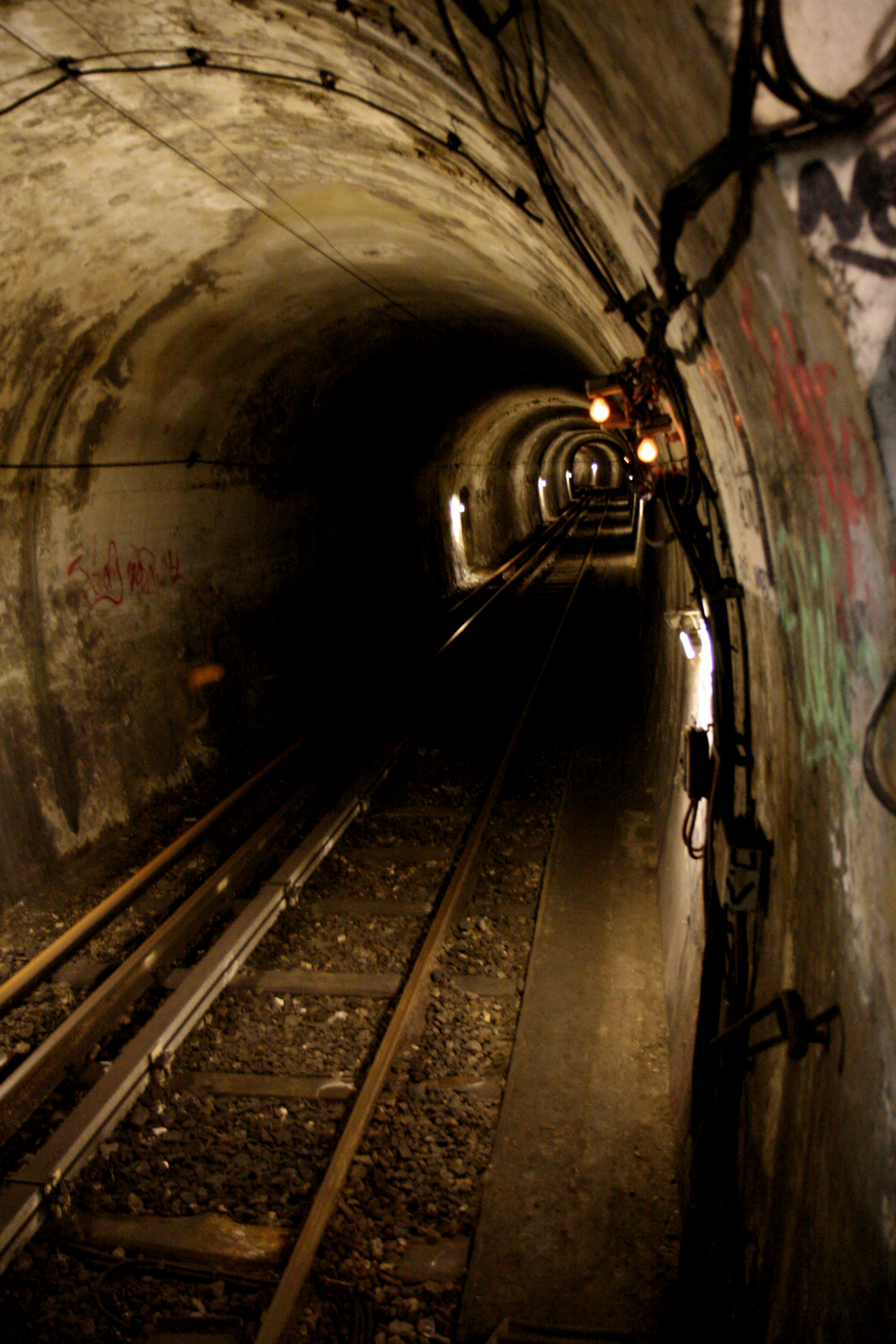
The voie des Fêtes seen from Haxo station towards Porte des Lilas.

After serving as a training track for metro drivers, first on iron and then on rubber tires, and for the introduction of new rolling stock, the voie navette to the north, near Pré-Saint-Gervais station, was converted into a reinforced inspection station, i.e. a small maintenance workshop for the MF 88 equipment on line 7 bis. The tunnel is partly used to park trains, with seven parking positions. In addition to a separation grid, the track still has its wooden tire tracks from the MP 51 trials.

Southward, Porte des Lilas station on the voie navette and the voie des Fêtes has an unusual role. Unused for commercial service since 1939, except for the temporary reopening of one of the station's two platforms for MP 51 passenger service from 1952 to 1956, it has been transformed into a film set for advertising and cinema, hence its current name, Porte des Lilas - Cinéma.

Filming in metro stations open to the public is very restrictive, due to the short nightly interruptions that would allow their use. This is where most of the films set in the Paris metro are shot. Depending on the needs of the film, fake enamel signs with different station names are created to turn the station into a different one for the duration of the filming.

== Projects ==
In particular, these two tracks are intended to be used for the possible merger of lines 3 bis and 7 bis, as planned in the Master Plan for the Île-de-France Region (SDRIF- Schéma Directeur de la Région Île-de-France).
