= Haxo station =

Unused metro station in Paris, France

Haxo
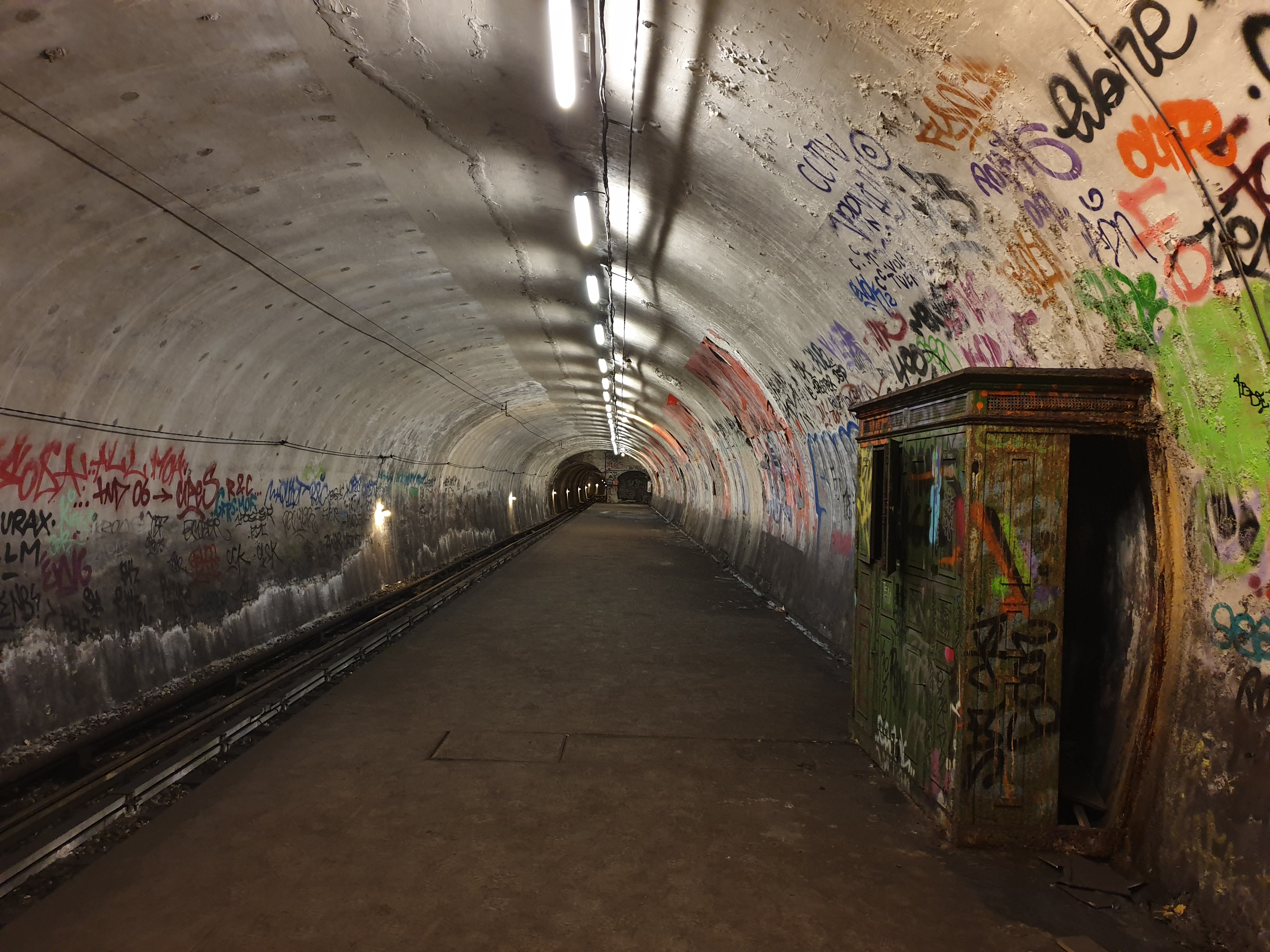

General information
- Location: 19th arrondissement of Paris; Île-de-France; France
- Coordinates: 48°52′43″N 2°24′06″E
- System: Paris Metro station
- Owner: RATP
- Operator: RATP

Other information
- Fare zone: N/A
Location
- Location within Paris

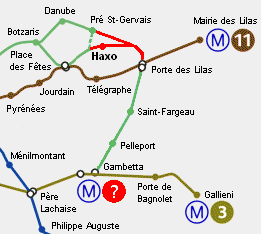
Where Haxo would appear on Paris' Metro map if it were open on merged lines 3bis and 7bis (see Future)

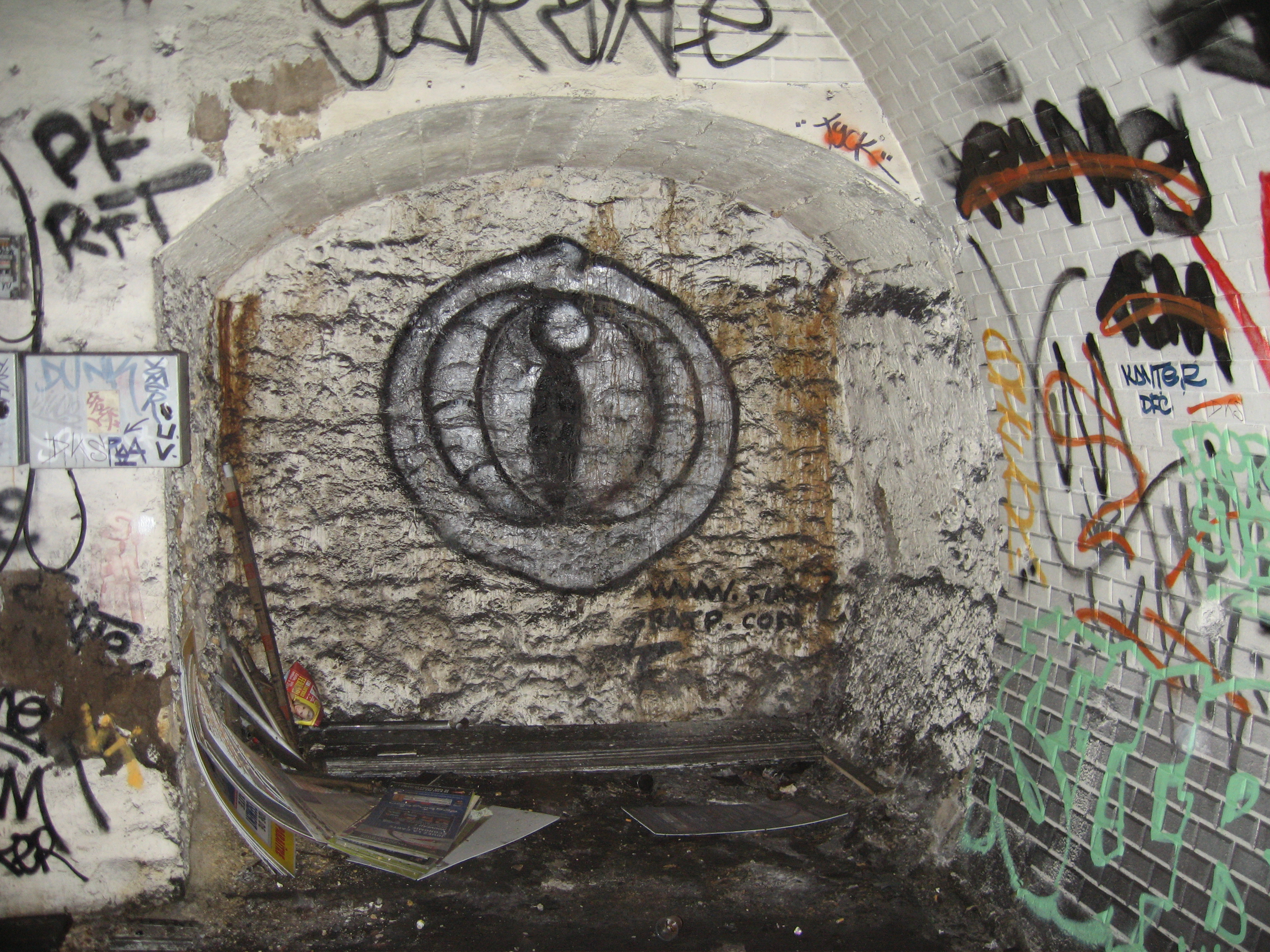
Explicit graffiti in Haxo station

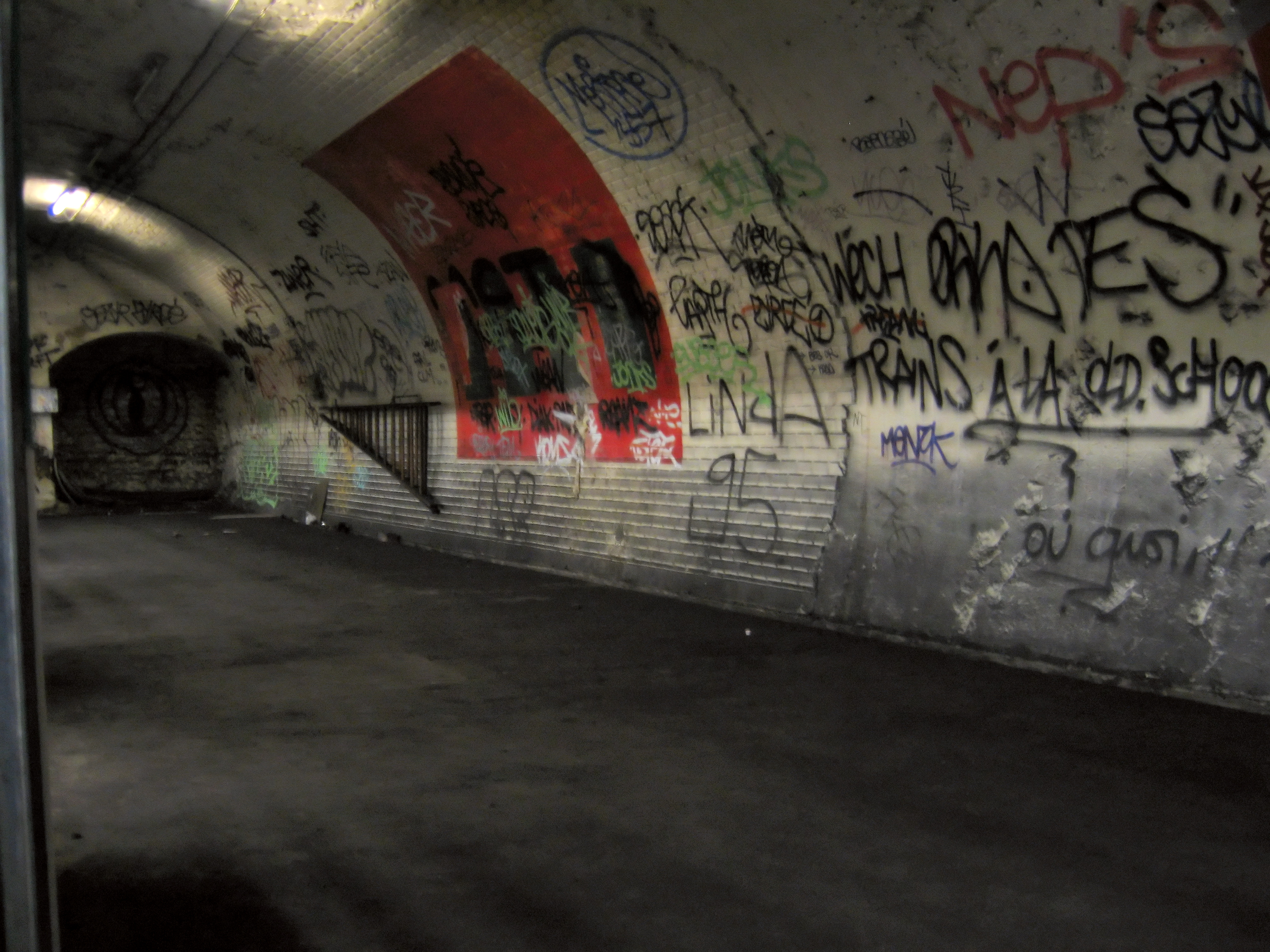
Haxo

Haxo (French pronunciation: [akso]) is a never-opened ghost station on the Paris Metro, located on an unused connecting branch between lines 3bis and 7bis.

== History ==
The station is situated on a single-track line, called voie des Fêtes, constructed in the 1920s between Place des Fêtes (line 7 then, line 7bis now), and Porte des Lilas (line 3 then, 3bis now), close to Pré-Saint-Gervais (line 7bis), in order to allow an extension of said line from the Danube loop towards the Porte des Lilas, for an easier connection to the Line 3, which at the time served the area. For traffic in the other direction, another track was constructed linking Porte des Lilas to Pré Saint-Gervais, with no intermediate station, called la voie navette. Consequently, Haxo would have been a single-direction station with only one platform, like Église d'Auteuil or Chardon-Lagache on Line 10.

However, despite the network owners, the City of Paris, having delivered the necessary infrastructure, the railway operator, Compagnie du chemin de fer métropolitain de Paris, did not consider a service to be sufficiently profitable and thus halted the extension process in favor of a single-train shuttle from Pré-Saint-Gervais.

Service trains have never called at Haxo, and no pedestrian access to street level was ever constructed. Occasional special enthusiast trains call at Haxo for photography, and the station was also used to demonstrate the MF 88 rolling stock to the press in 1993 (the "1993" sign can be seen on some pictures, still hung more than 10 years later).

== Future ==
Studies about merging Paris Metro lines 3bis and 7bis using the existing currently untrafficked infrastructure have been made, which would therefore finally open Haxo for passenger use. The combined lines would run from Château-Landon to Gambetta.

At the moment, the voie navette is blocked at Pré-Saint-Gervais, on the station's second track, by an additional maintenance facility for the MF 88 rolling stock, due to said rolling stock's unreliability. Therefore, the line merger would first require completing the programmed cascading of MF 88 rolling stock to the brand new MF 19, which is expected for 2026.

== Station layout ==
Street Level (no entrance)
Platform	Inbound	← No regular service (any service passing through does not stop here) (Pré Saint-Gervais is the next stop)
Platform	Outbound	No regular service (Porte des Lilas is the next stop) → (No service from inbound: Place des Fêtes)
Platform	Side platform, not in service

- Note: The planned line 7 extension does not pass through Haxo on its way to Pré Saint-Gervais; It uses an outer track, la Voie Navette, next to the station yet not visible from its platform.

== See also ==
- North End tube station – never-opened station on the London Underground.
- Porte Molitor station – never-opened station on the Paris Metro.
- Kymlinge – never-opened station on the Stockholm Metro.
