= Merger of Paris Metro lines 3bis and 7bis =

Proposed merger of two Paris Metro lines

The merger of Paris Metro Line 3bis and Line 7bis is a proposal to create a new line of the Metro, from Château-Landon station to Gambetta station. The new line would extend westward beyond the current terminus of Line 7bis, at Louis Blanc.

== History ==
=== Formation of the bis lines ===
Detailed map of ways on Line 7bis (around Pré Saint-Gervais station and the ghost station Haxo), Line 3bis and Line 11 (around Porte des Lilas station)

Line 3bis used to be part of the extension of Line 3 from Gambetta to Porte des Lilas, which opened on 27 November 1921. Line 3bis came into existence on 27 March 1971, when the RATP disconnected the branch ahead of the re-routing of the eastern end of Line 3 from Gambetta to Gallieni.

Line 7bis used to be a northern branch of Line 7 from Louis Blanc to Pré-Saint-Gervais (via a three-station single-track loop), which opened on 18 January 1911. Line 7bis came into existence on 3 December 1967, when the RATP spun off the branch because of its low traffic.

=== Navette ===
Navette
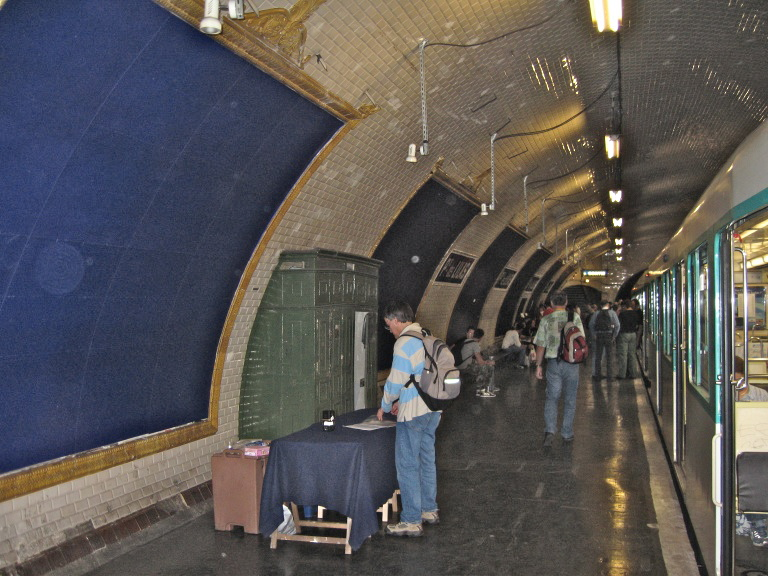
- Former Navette platform of Porte des Lilas

Overview
- Termini: Pré-Saint-Gervais; Porte des Lilas
- Connecting lines: Paris Metro Paris Metro Line 3 Paris Metro Line 7 Paris Metro Line 11
- Stations: 2

Service
- System: Paris Metro
- Operator(s): RATP (Note: Operated by the CMP during the first era (1921–1939).)
- Rolling stock: MP 51 (1 train)

History
- Opened: 27 November 1921
- Suspended: 2 September 1939
- Reopened: 13 April 1952
- Closed: 31 May 1956

Technical
- Track gauge: 1,435 mm (4 ft 8 1/2 in) standard gauge
- Electrification: 750 V DC third rail
- Conduction system: Conductor

The Navette on the Paris Metro (lit. 'Shuttle') was a single-track shuttle that operated between Porte des Lilas and Pré-Saint-Gervais, using the titular Voie Navette. The shuttle connected Line 7 (at Pré Saint-Gervais) with Lines 3 and 11 (at Porte des Lilas) and had no intermediate stations.

The shuttle first operated from 27 November 1921 to the outbreak of World War II on 2 September 1939, with a single train running back and forth between the two stations on the Voie Navette. After the war, the RATP reopened the shuttle as a prototype rubber-tyred metro line from 13 April 1952 to 31 May 1956, with a single MP 51 car running back and forth as well.

The shuttle was supposed to be part of the extension of the then-northern branch of Line 7 from Pré Saint-Gervais to Porte des Lilas, where it would meet up with the then-eastern terminus Line 3. The planned extension consisted of two connecting tracks, the Voie Navette and Voie des Fêtes, which converged at the new Cinéma platforms at Porte des Lilas. The extension also included a new southbound-only station on the Voie des Fêtes, called Haxo.

Although the CMP completed the connecting lines and the platforms of Haxo and Porte des Lilas, it never fully opened the extension. Only the Voie Navette saw passenger service, and Haxo became a notable ghost station.

Today, the Voie des Fêtes is a service connection between Line 3bis and Line 7bis, and the Voie Navette is part of a small maintenance facility for the MF 88 fleet of Line 7bis.

== Proposed new line ==
The new line would result from the merger of:

- Line 3bis, which currently links Gambetta station, where it branches from Line 3) to Porte des Lilas station, on the south-eastern (south to north) part of the new line;
- Line 7bis, which currently performs an anticlockwise loop on its eastern end from Botzaris station to its terminus at Pré-Saint-Gervais station via Place des Fêtes station but avoiding the closed station Haxo; it would link them to the current western terminus at Louis Blanc station, on the northwestern (east to west) part of the new line.

Both lines would be connected through an existing rail tunnel, the Voie navette (currently used only for very limited technical servicing) between Porte des Lilas station and Pré-Saint-Gervais station, to which it would be connected from the Place des Fêtes station by a short rail tunnel, the Voie des Fêtes (currently used and blocked by maintenance facilities), possibly by finally opening to the public the ghost station Haxo (but only in one direction), whose surface accesses would first need to be built. That would also mean reopening to traffic the secondary station Porte des Lilas – Cinéma and closing the current platforms at Porte des Lilas of Line 3bis.

Line 7bis would be also extended one station to the west, to have its terminus at Château-Landon to ease interconnection with RER E at Magenta station, which would allow access to the Gare de l'Est and Gare du Nord via existing pedestrian links. Therefore, Louis Blanc station would no longer be the western terminus of the line, but that would require the creation of a new tunnel and extensive works. The extension could, therefore, be finalised after the opening of the new line. For now, the last segment is used by the existing Line 7bis connection.

The planned route currently has no official line number: since November 2023, the next available Paris Métro route number is Line 20, following the assignment of Line 19 to a planned line between Nanterre–La Folie and Aéroport Charles de Gaulle 2 TGV.

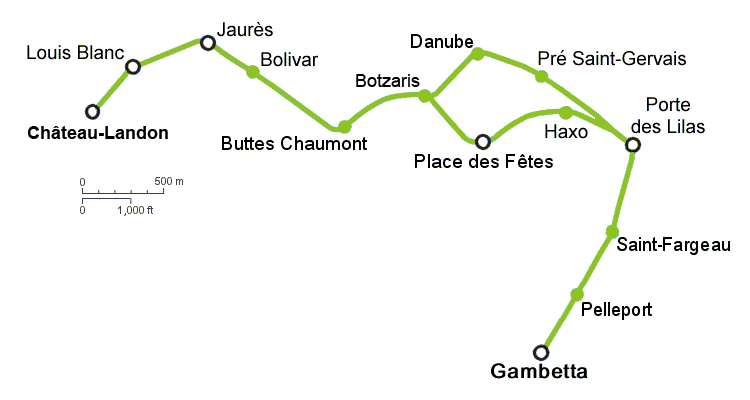
Stations on the projected new line

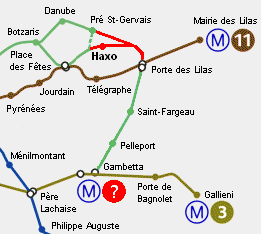
Part of Paris Métro map with lines 3bis and 7bis merged into a new line

== See also ==
- Haxo station – never-used station on the proposed line
