= Saint-Fargeau station =

Metro station in Paris, France

Saint-Fargeau
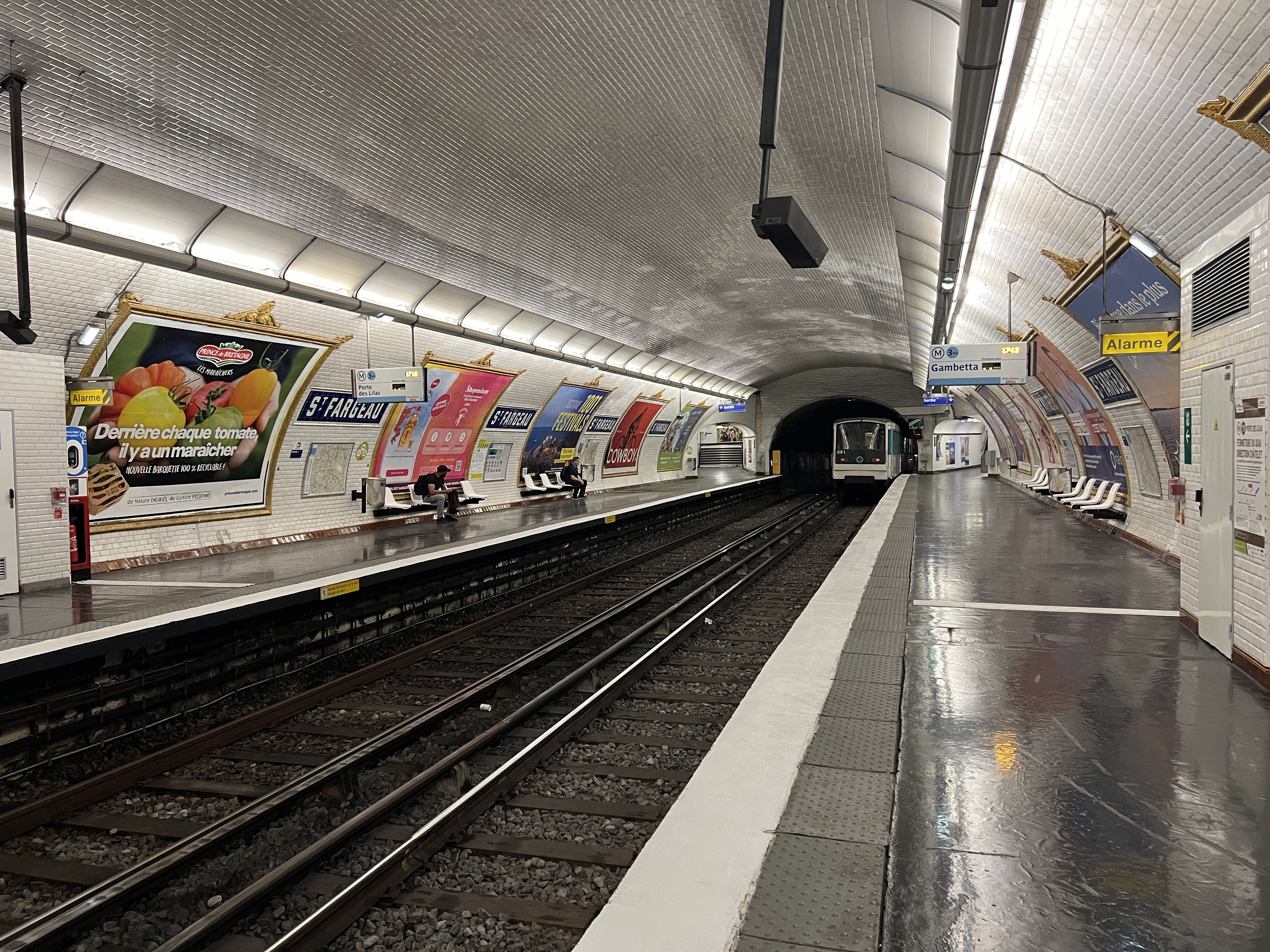
- Platforms

General information
- Location: 112, av. Gambetta; 20th arrondissement of Paris; Île-de-France; France
- Coordinates: 48°52′19″N 2°24′16″E
- System: Paris Metro station
- Owner: RATP
- Operator: RATP
- Line: Paris Metro Paris Metro Line 3bis
- Platforms: 2 (2 side platforms)
- Tracks: 2

Other information
- Station code: 24-08
- Fare zone: 1

History
- Opened: 27 November 1921

Passengers
- 339,164 (2020)

Services
Preceding station	Paris Metro	Following station
Pelleport towards Gambetta	Line 3bis	Porte des Lilas Terminus
Location
- Location within Paris

Saint-Fargeau (French pronunciation: [sɛ̃ faʁʒo]) is a station of the Paris Metro, serving Line 3bis. The station owes its name to its location under Place Saint-Fargeau, which was named after the politician Louis-Michel le Peletier, marquis de Saint-Fargeau (1760-1793) who had participated in the French Revolution and was assassinated in 1793, allegedly for voting for the execution of Louis XVI.

== History ==
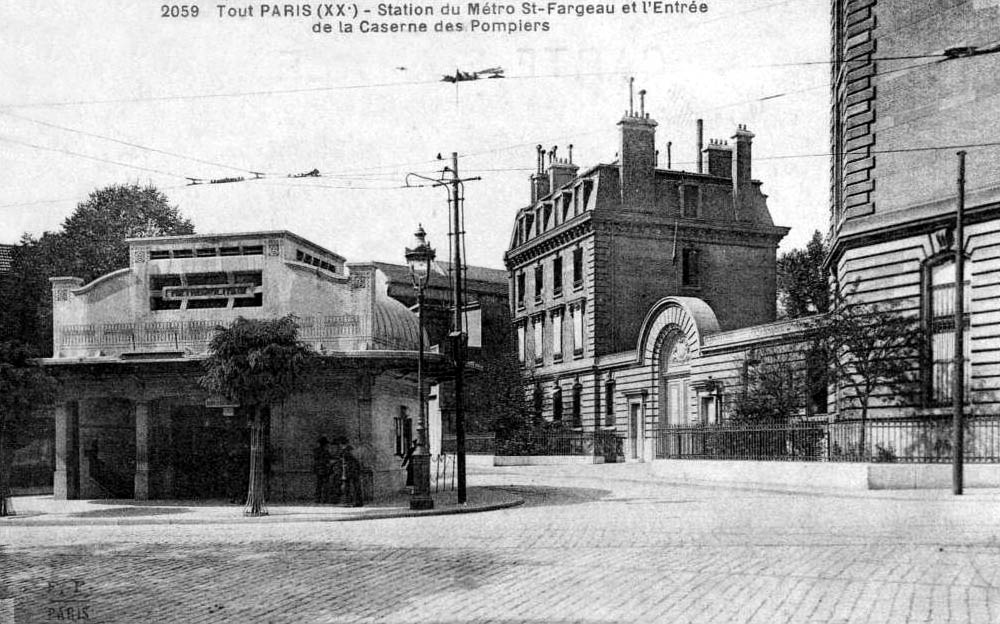
Saint-Fargeau c.1921

The station opened on 27 November 1921 when Line 3 was extended from Gambetta to Porte des Lilas. On 27 March 1971, it was transferred to line 3bis on its establishment when line 3 was extended from Gambetta to Gallieni. As part of the Un métro + beau programme by the RATP, the station was renovated and modernised on 12 November 2003.

In 2019, the station was used by 716,699 passengers, making it the 294th busiest of the Metro network out of 302 stations.

In 2020, the station was used by 339,164 passengers amidst the COVID-19 pandemic, making it the 294h busiest of the Metro network out of 305 stations.

== Passenger services ==
=== Access ===
The station has a single entrance at Place Saint-Fargeau with an original surface building designed by Charles Plumet, like the two adjacent stations Pelleport and Porte des Lilas.

=== Station layout ===
Street Level
B1	Mezzanine
Line 3bis platforms	Side platform, doors will open on the right
Line 3bis platforms	Southbound	← toward Gambetta (Pelleport)
Line 3bis platforms	Northbound	toward Porte des Lilas (Terminus) →
Line 3bis platforms	Side platform, doors will open on the right

=== Platforms ===
The station has a standard configuration with 2 tracks surrounded by 2 side platforms. Due to its significant depth, 2 lifts are provided along with stairs to its entrance.

=== Other connections ===
The station is also served by lines 61, 64, and 96 of the RATP bus network.

== Gallery ==
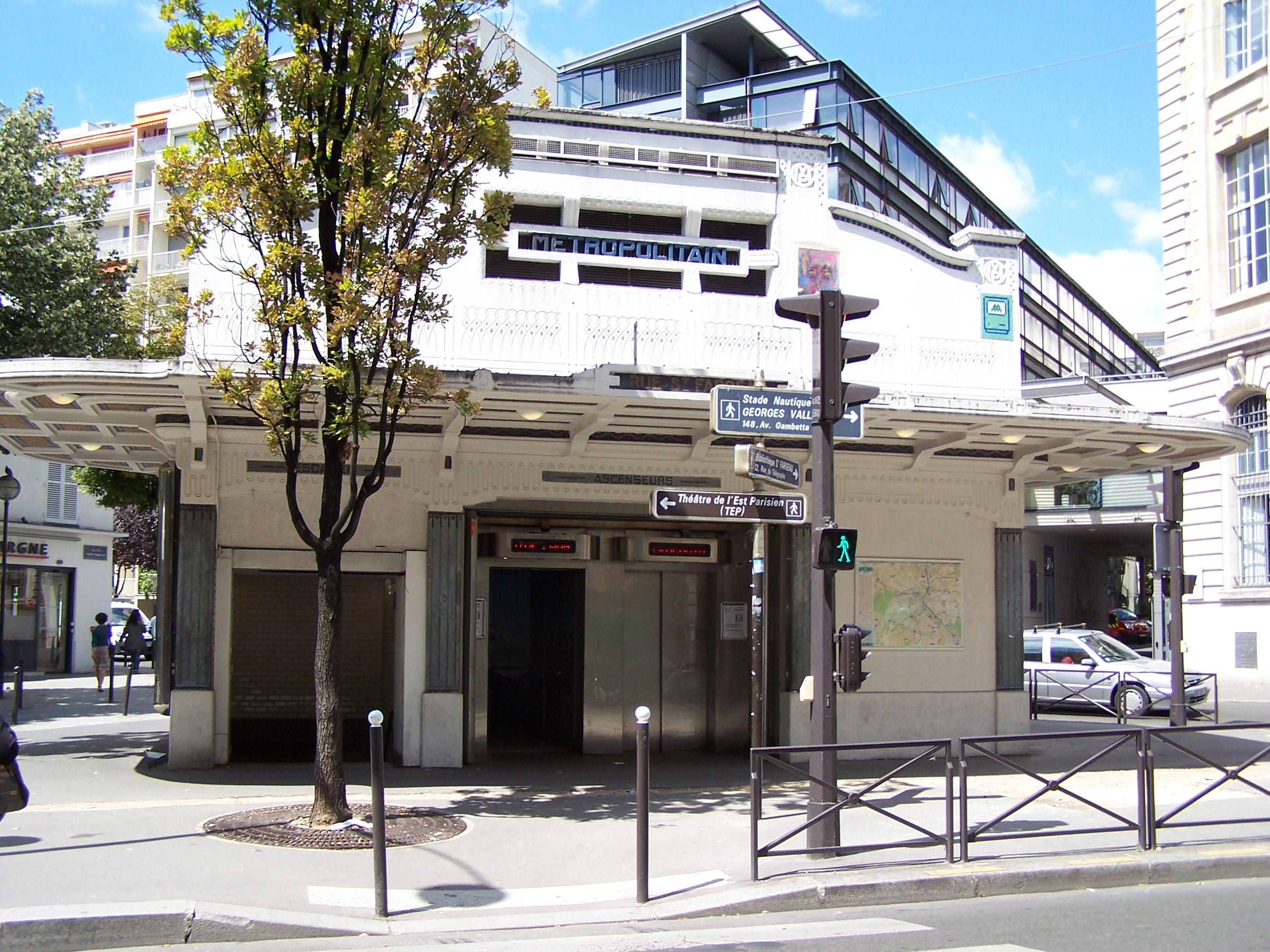
Entrance

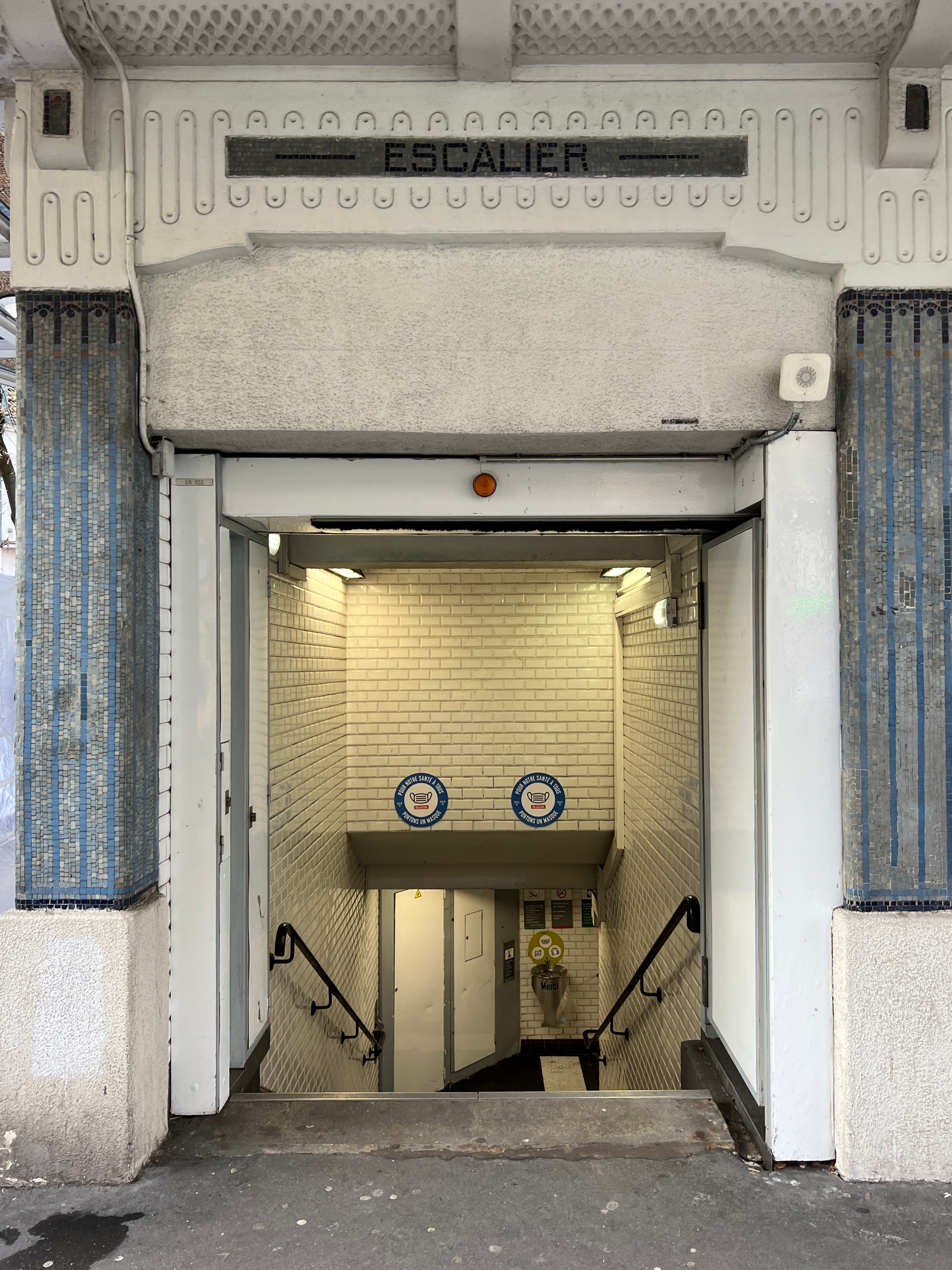
Stairs inside the surface building

MF 67 at Saint-Fargeau

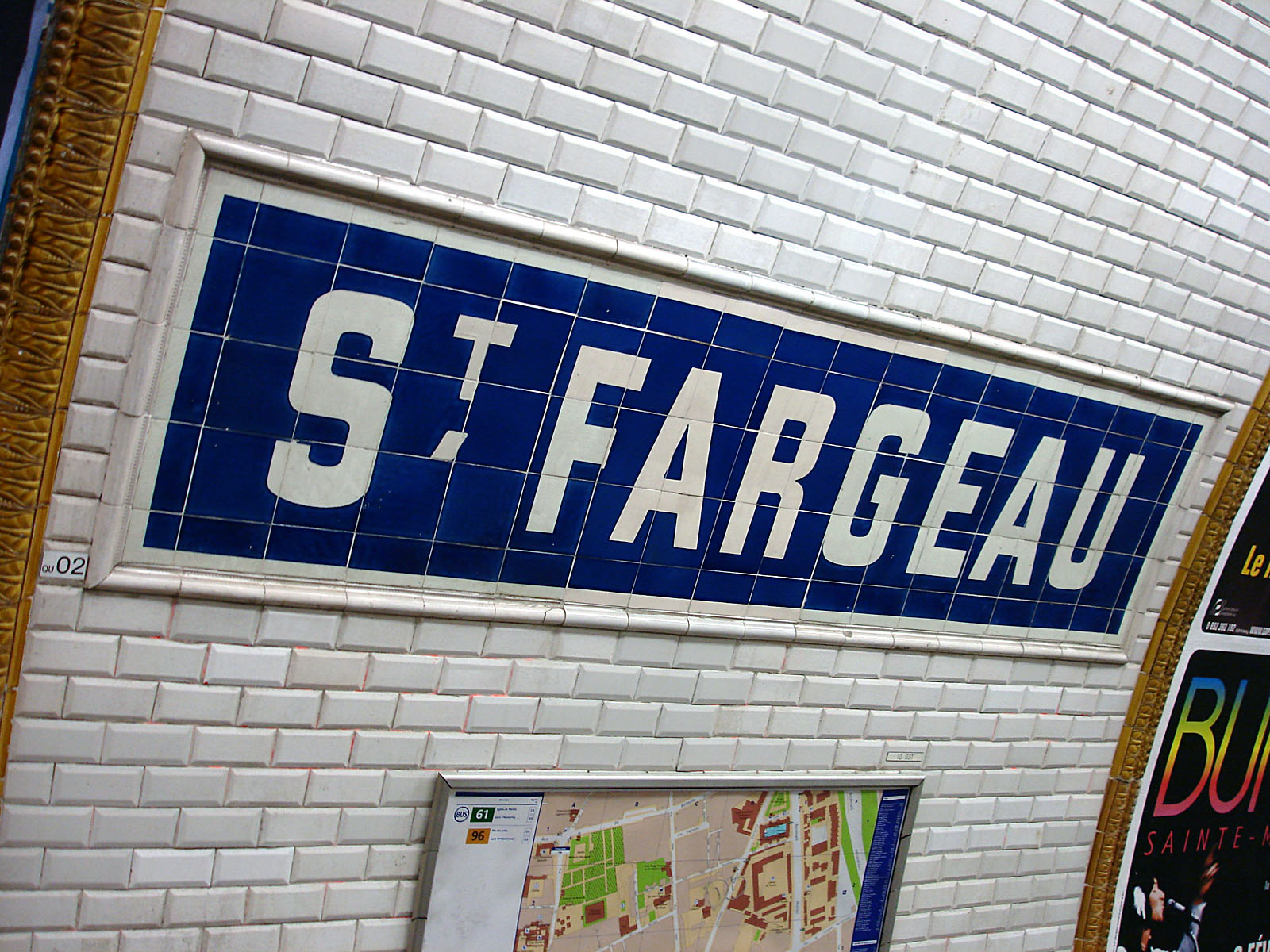
