= Paris Metro Line 3bis =

Subway route in the French capital

Line 3bis
- Paris Metro Line 3bis
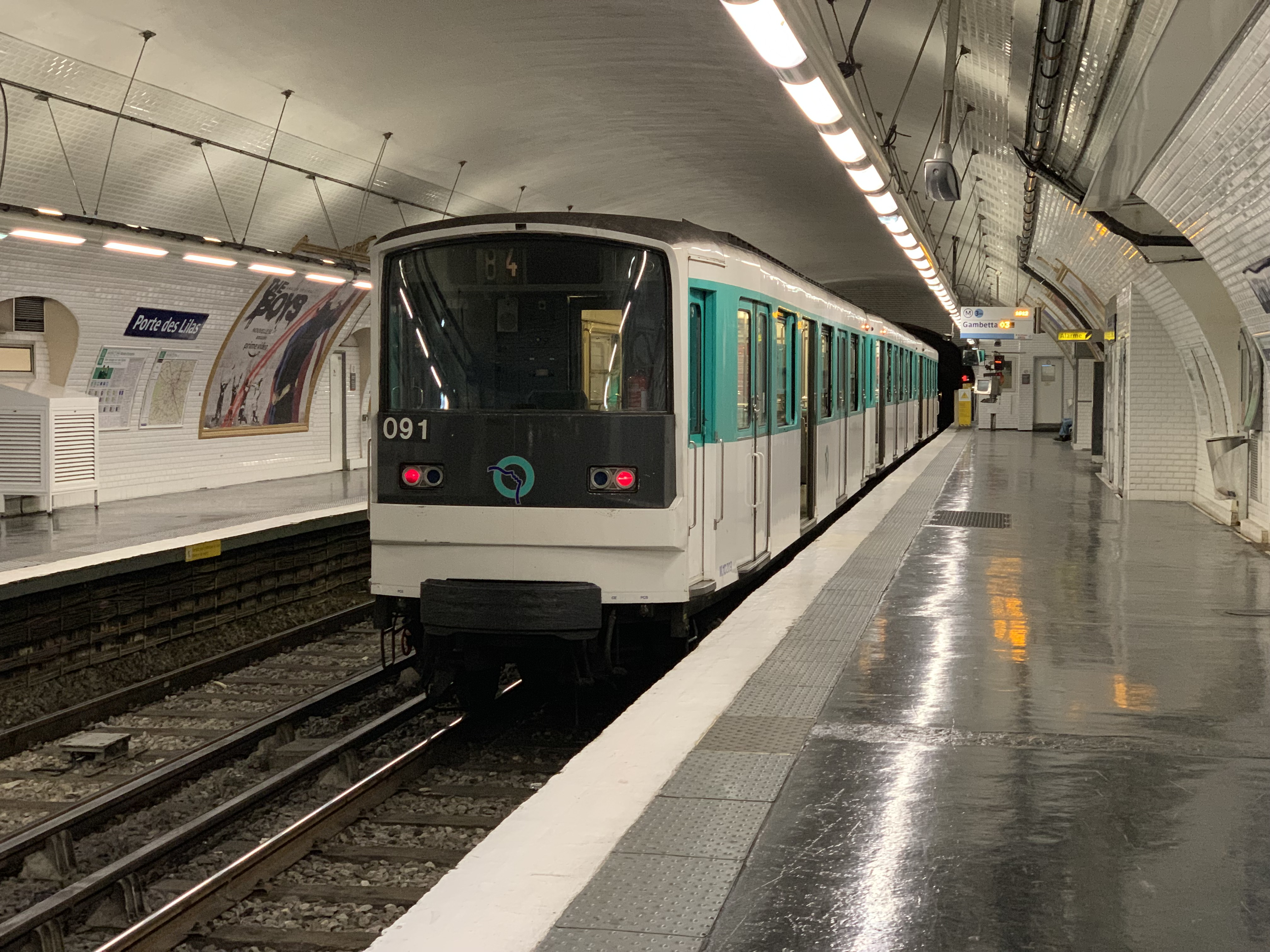
- Porte des Lilas, the line's northern terminus

Overview
- Locale: Paris
- Termini: Gambetta; Porte des Lilas
- Connecting lines: Paris Metro Paris Metro Line 3 Paris Metro Line 11 Tramways in Île-de-France Île-de-France tramway Line 3b
- Stations: 4

Service
- System: Paris Metro
- Operator: RATP
- Rolling stock: MF 67 (6 trains as of 31 October 2010)
- Ridership: 1,680,539 (avg. per year); 16th/16 (2025)

History
- Opened: 27 March 1971; 55 years ago

Technical
- Line length: 1.3 km (0.81 mi)
- Track gauge: 1,435 mm (4 ft 8 1/2 in) standard gauge
- Electrification: 750 V DC third rail
- Conduction system: Conductor
- Average inter-station distance: 433 m (1,421 ft)

Paris Metro Line 3bis (French: Ligne 3 bis du métro de Paris) is one of the sixteen currently open lines of the Paris Metro. This short shuttle connects Gambetta and Porte des Lilas in the 20th arrondissement, east of Paris. With a length of 1.3 kilometres (0.81 mi) and four stations, this is the shortest line currently open in the network. It is also the least used line, with just over 1.6 million passengers in 2003, behind Line 7bis's 3.5 million.

The line was constructed in one block during the 1910s as an extension to Line 3, but the two parts were disconnected in 1971 when Line 3 was extended to Bagnolet - Gallieni, following the same fate as the Danube branch of Line 7 which became Line 7bis four years prior. From then on the line, now dubbed 3bis, was operated separately. As of 2010, six MF 67 trains, each shortened to three cars, run on the line.

== History ==
=== Chronology ===
- 27 November 1921 – The section from Gambetta to Porte des Lilas on Line 3, as well as a shuttle between Lines 3 and 7, are opened.
- 3 September 1939 – The shuttle service is closed at the dawn of the second World War, and never reopened to public service since.
- 27 March 1971 – The Gambetta to Porte des Lilas section is disconnected from Line 3 as the main line is diverted towards Bagnolet, and becomes Line 3bis.

=== Metro Line 3 ===
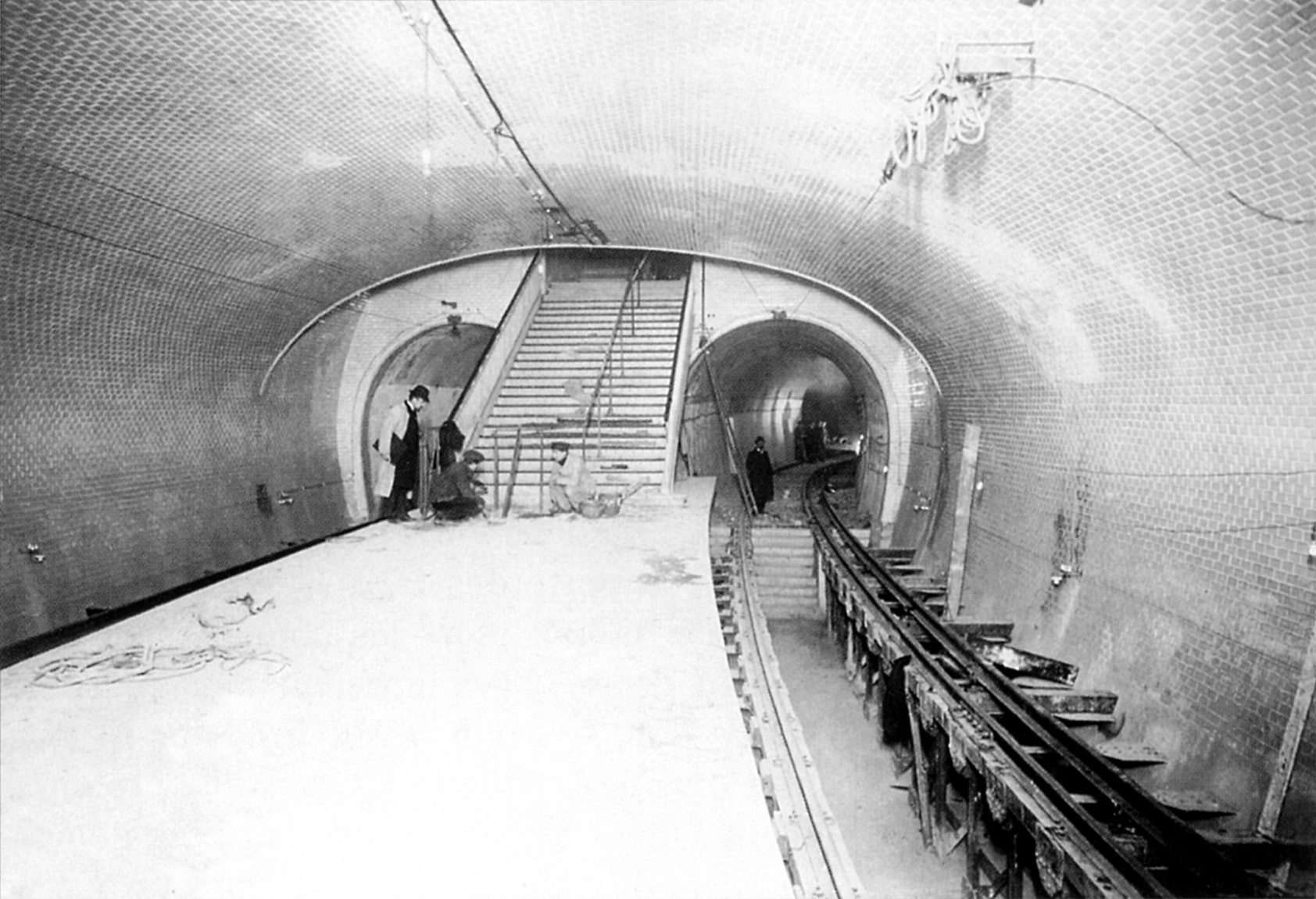
Gambetta station on Line 3, shortly before it was opened in 1905. In 1971, this platform became the terminus of Line 3bis, with new platforms installed for Line 3 between this station and the following one, Martin Nadaud, which was merged into the new platforms at Gambetta.

On 13 March 1903, the Council of Paris granted the Compagnie du chemin de fer métropolitain de Paris (CMP) the right to build a second east–west Metro line, in addition to Line 1. On 19 October 1904, the section of Line 3 running from Villiers to Père Lachaise was opened; the remainder of the line to Gambetta was opened on 25 January 1905. The new line contained seventeen stations. A westward extension was progressively put into service, first to Pereire on 23 May 1910 and later to Porte de Champerret on 15 February 1911.

=== Expansion of Line 3 ===
On 14 June 1901, the Council of Paris announced its wish for a study regarding the construction of a network to complement the first lines; the goal was to leave no point in the city more than 400 metres (0.25 mi) away from a metro station. The Fulgence Bienvenüe project was presented on 4 December 1901, and proposed a number of new lines and expansions, including one to line 3 from Gambetta to the Romainville porte (Porte des Lilas).

A second loan of 179 million francs for the work was approved on 26 June 1903. On 28 December 1905, the Council of Paris awarded the expansion project to the CMP. The decision was formalized on 23 December 1907. Eventually, a third loan of 40 million francs was authorized on 10 April 1908, but this was not granted until April 1910 due to the associated déclaration d'utilité publique, a process required in France to demonstrate the public benefits of a proposed project.

The planned extension, which would connect to line 7 (now 7bis) at the station Pré-Saint-Gervais, stretched 2.157 kilometres (1.340 mi). It was constructed under the avenue Gambetta to the Porte des Lilas, where a turnaround loop was installed under the city walls. The local terrain was especially moist and unstable due to the ancient Saint-Fargeau Lake, and thus made construction difficult. As a result, the tunnel was built in a layer of gypsum very deep underground. Stations were contained in a reinforced vault, with elevators linking the platforms to the surface. Beyond the Porte des Lilas, a double-track tunnel extended by two single-track tunnels—the voie des Fêtes (south tunnel) and the voie navette ("shuttle line", north tunnel) connected the extension to line 7—allowing the latter to be extended to Porte des Lilas in the future.

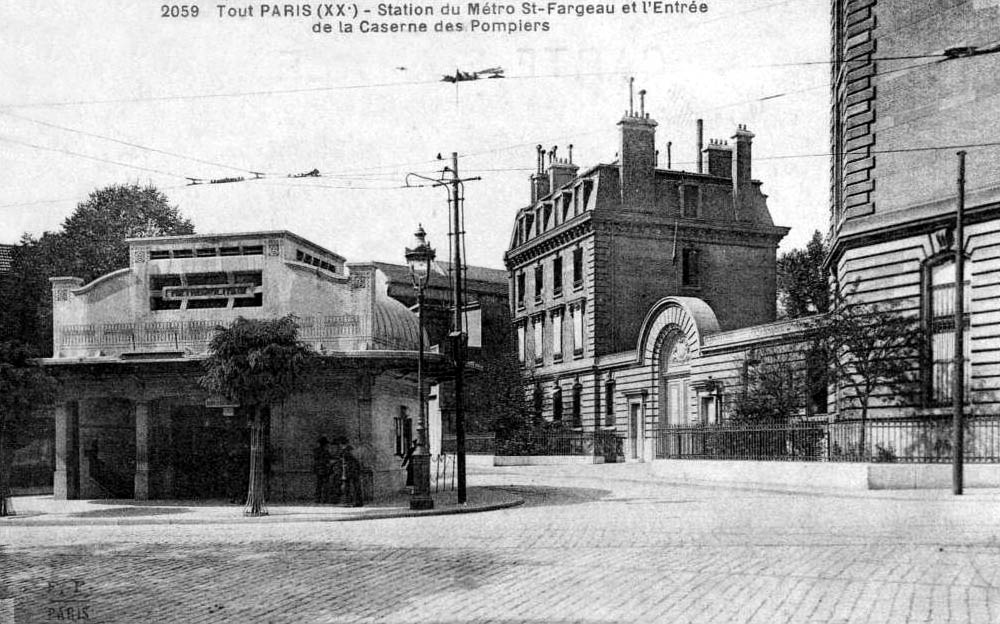
Entrance to the station Saint-Fargeau, with its characteristic architecture, circa 1920.

The work was nearly finished before the start of World War I, during which it ground to a halt. The project was returned to the CMP on 23 February 1920, but work did not resume immediately; the CMP waited for the city to provide the necessary funds that had been granted in the new 1920 convention. The final work was completed in December 1920.

Although originally planned, the plan for trains on line 7 to continue to Porte des Lilas was eventually abandoned, as trains on line 3 provided an adequate service on this branch (at the time, as Line 11 wasn't opened until 1935). Nevertheless, in order to connect lines 3 and 7, a shuttle was planned to run through the north connecting tunnel, later named la voie navette. The Sprague-Thomson variant of rolling stock serviced this tunnel, taken from line 2. This variant measured 10.85 metres (35 ft 7 in) in length and consisted of one train powered by two motors. With these changes, the voie des Fêtes tunnel and Haxo station were left unused: the former serving as a train shed and the latter being left to this day inaccessible to the public. The Gambetta – Porte des Lilas section and the shuttle were inaugurated on 27 November 1921.

The shuttle ceased operation on 3 September 1939 as part of the World War II service cutbacks.

=== Creation of Line 3 bis ===
Map of Line 3bis

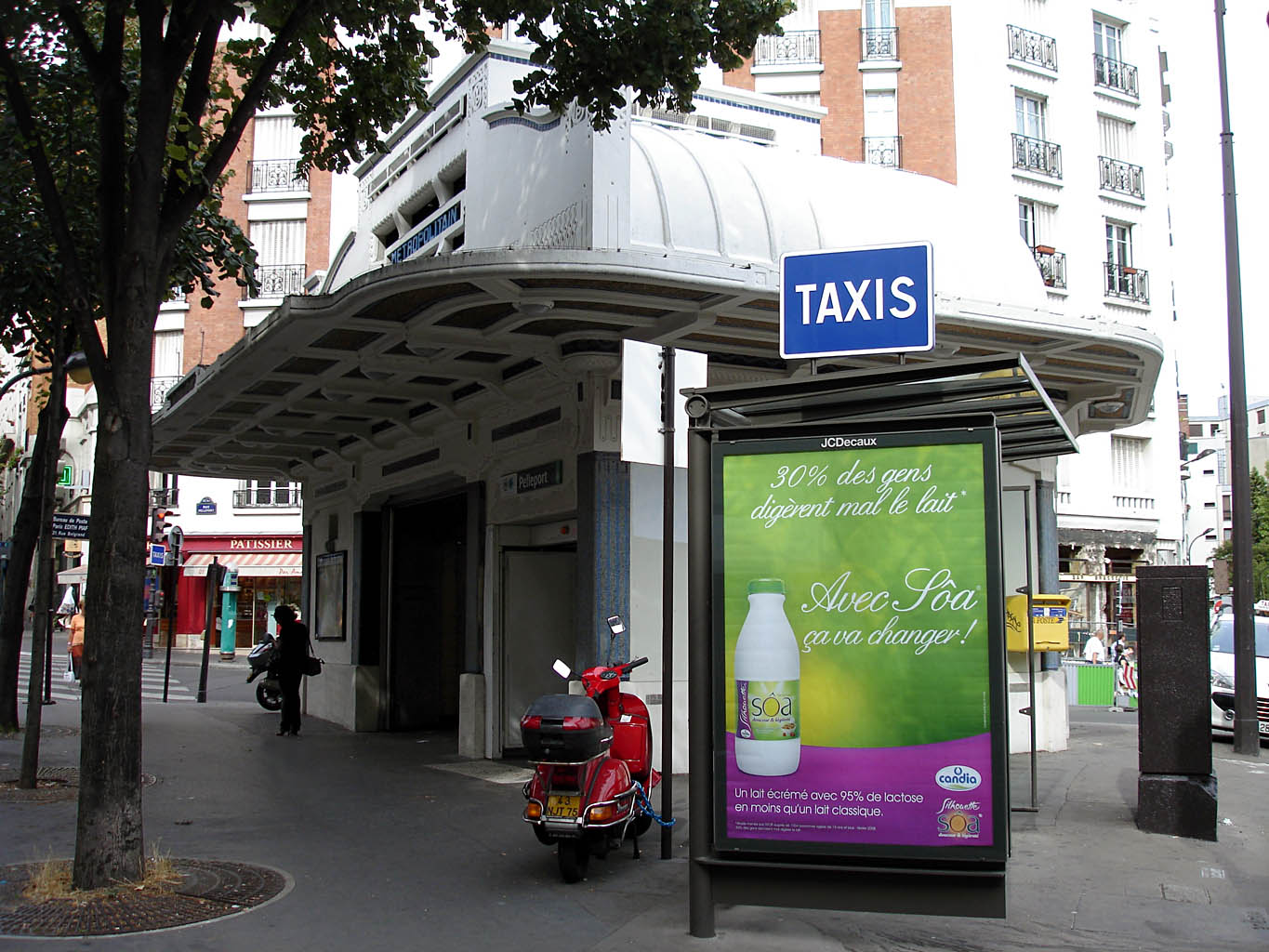
Entrance to the station Pelleport.

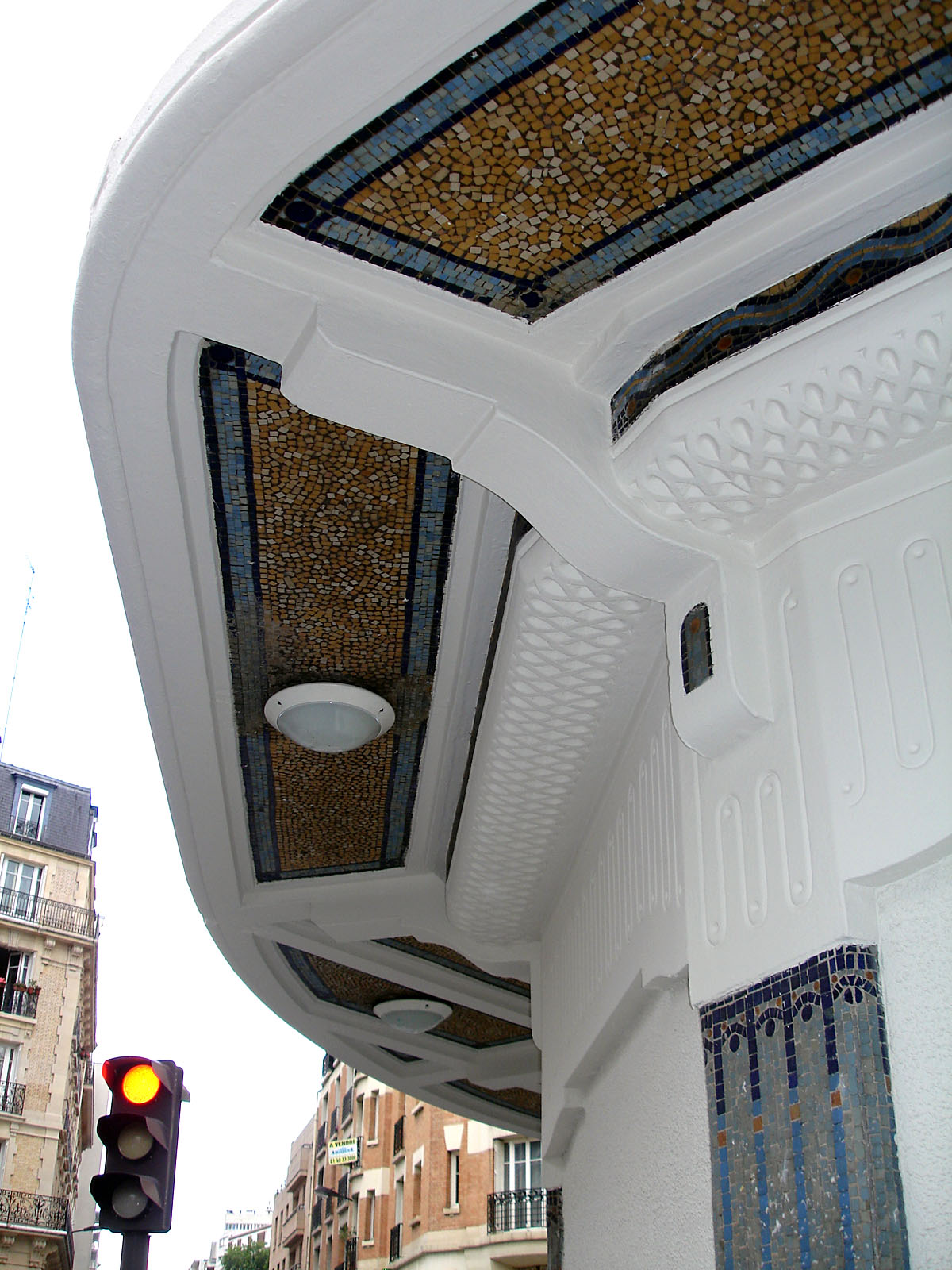
Decoration on the entrance of the station Saint-Fargeau.

During the 1960s, the public complained that public transport was inadequate in the Porte de Bagnolet area, despite great demand. It was therefore decided to extend Line 3 to Bagnolet (Gallieni) from Gambetta. As the passenger traffic to Bagnolet was expected to be much greater than that to Porte des Lilas, the construction of a fork was ruled out. Using Porte des Lilas as the terminus was abandoned in favor of creating a new terminus, and it was decided to construct a separate section of track running from Gambetta to Porte des Lilas, to be called line 3bis.

To accommodate these changes, Gambetta, which at the time consisted of two tracks on a single deck (something rare on the historical metro), underwent major alteration. The southern half-station was demolished and the northern half-station was renovated to become the terminus of the new line 3bis, with two tracks on either side of a central platform. New tracks were constructed for line 3, and the station Martin Nadaud, which was only 235 metres (771 ft) from the old stations (under the square of the same name), was closed. The new platforms are on the site of this old station, in the direction of Pont de Levallois; this explains the longer-than-normal platforms at Gambetta.

Gambetta was opened on 23 August 1969, but line 3 bis did not open until 27 March 1971. The expansion to Bagnolet was opened on 2 April 1971. In 1970, line 3 bis was linked to a poste de commande centralisé (PCC), or central command post, along with line 3. Despite this, line 3 bis has not been equipped with driverless cars, as the small amount of traffic on the line did not justify the installation of such a system.

== Route and stations ==
=== Route ===
Geographically accurate route of Line 3bis

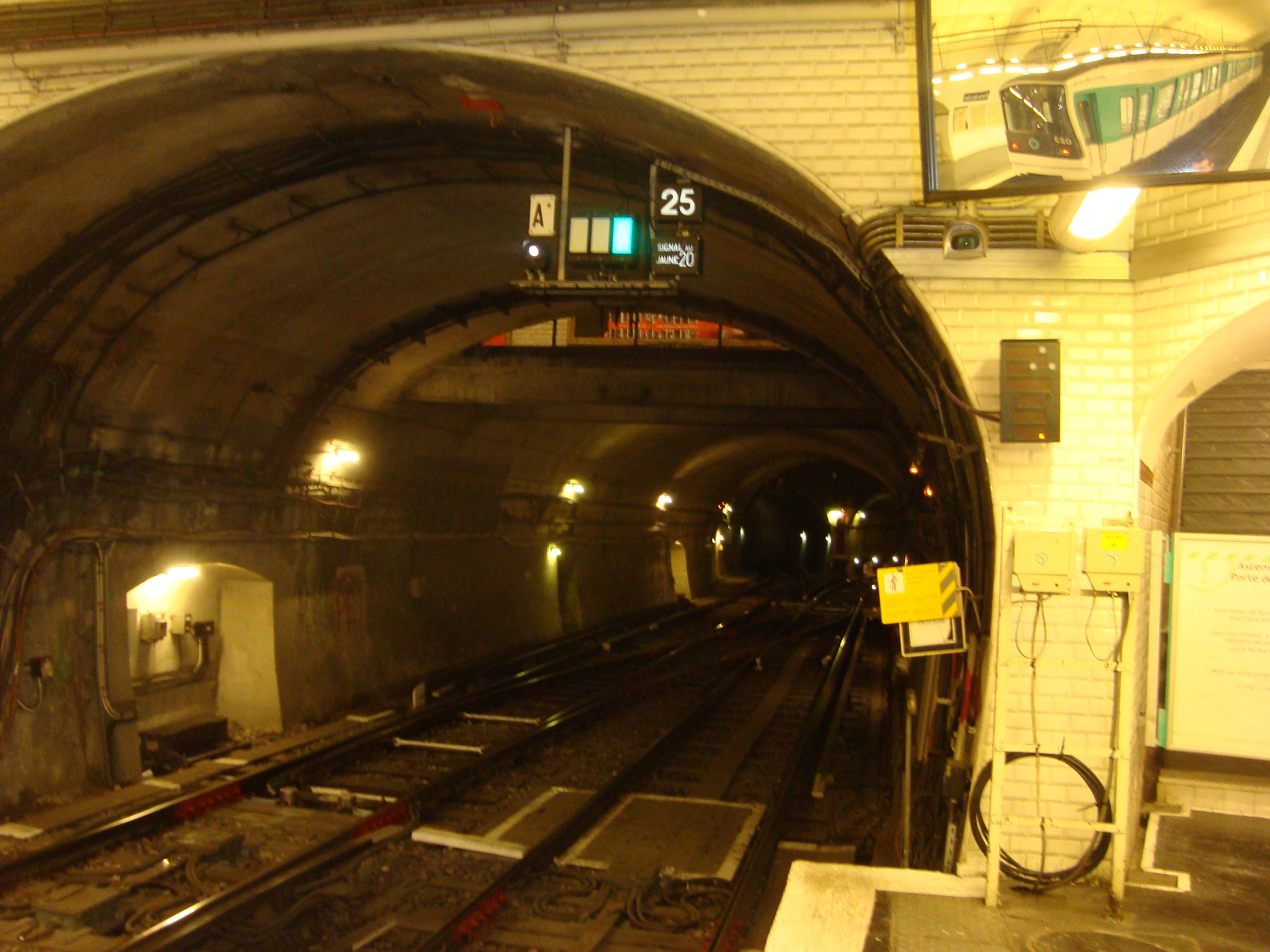
The turnaround loop at the station Porte des Lilas.

Line 3bis runs a total length of 1.289 kilometres (0.801 miles) entirely underground. With only four stations, the average distance between stations is 433 metres (1,421 ft).

The line begins at the Gambetta terminus with its two tracks joined by a central platform. The line follows the avenue Gambetta in a north-east axis, following a nearly straight route to pass through the two deep stations of Pelleport and Saint-Fargeau, before reaching its terminus at Porte des Lilas. The line ends with a turnaround loop, with one of the two tracks allowing for trains to be transferred to the voie navette.

=== List of stations ===
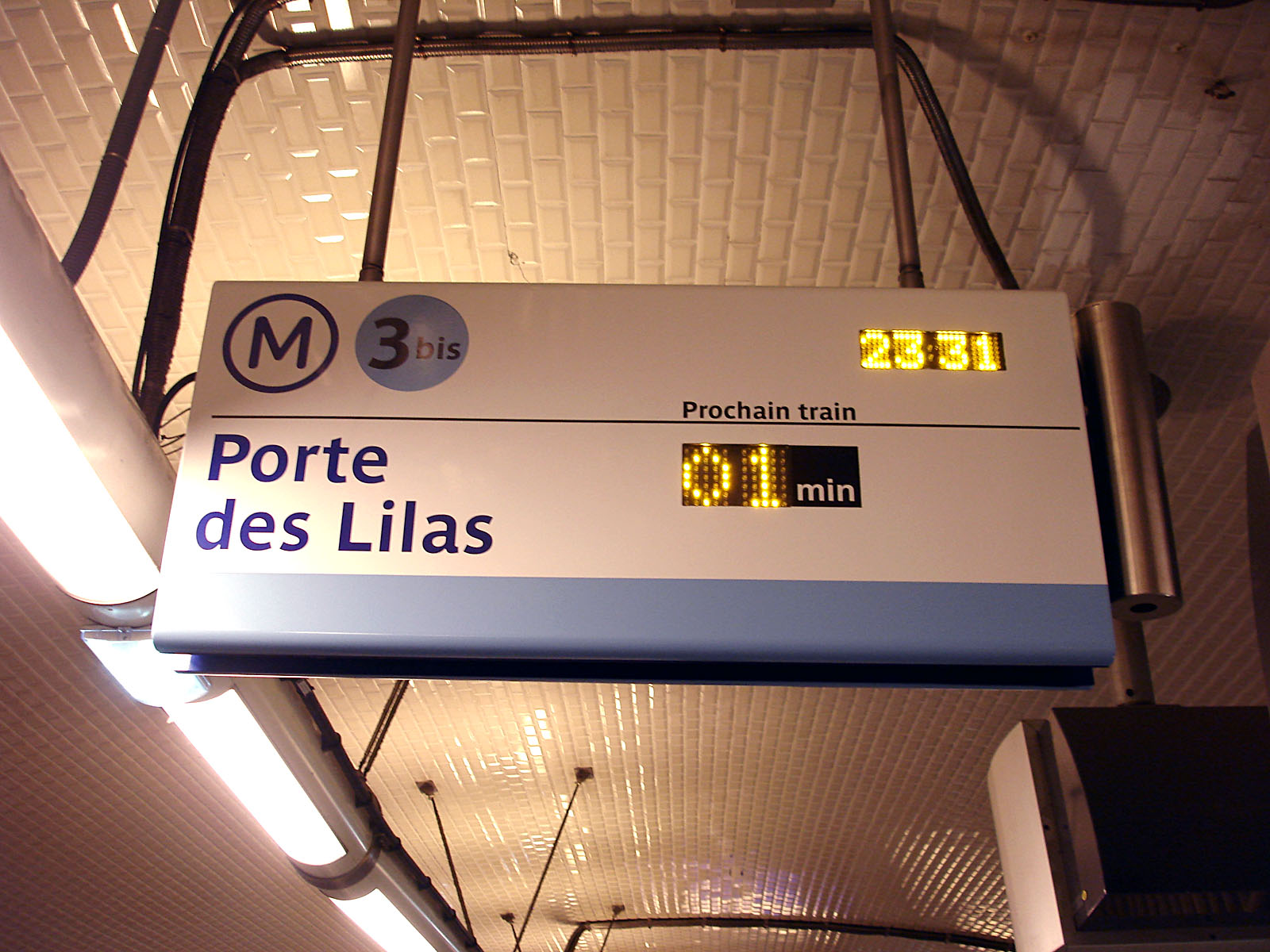
A SIEL board at the Gambetta station.

Station	Arrondissements	Connections
Gambetta	20th	Paris Metro Paris Metro Line 3
Pelleport	20th	
Saint-Fargeau	20th	
Porte des Lilas	19th, 20th	Paris Metro Paris Metro Line 11 Tramways in Île-de-France Île-de-France tramway Line 3b

Until 2009, line 3bis and line 7bis were the only lines to not have been equipped with SIEL, a system that provides passengers the waiting time until the next two trains. At the end of 2009 and beginning of 2010, the two bis lines were equipped with this system. On these lines however, the system provides only the waiting time for the next incoming train (as opposed to the times for the next two incoming trains on the main lines, or four in the case of lines 7 and 13 in the direction of the branches). The installation of this system in the two bis lines completed the system's deployment along Paris' transportation network.

=== Themed or otherwise unique stations ===
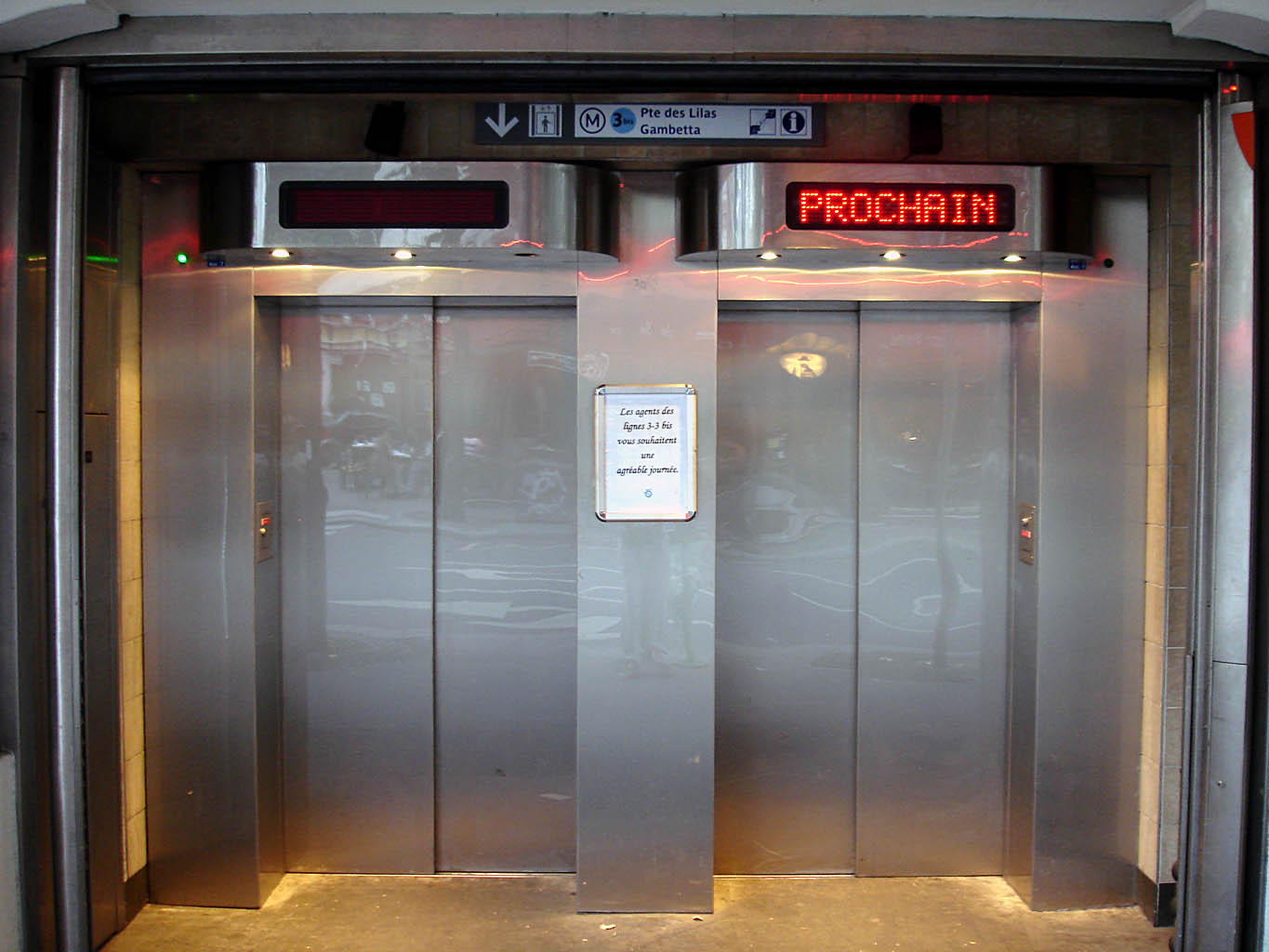
Elevators at the station Pelleport.

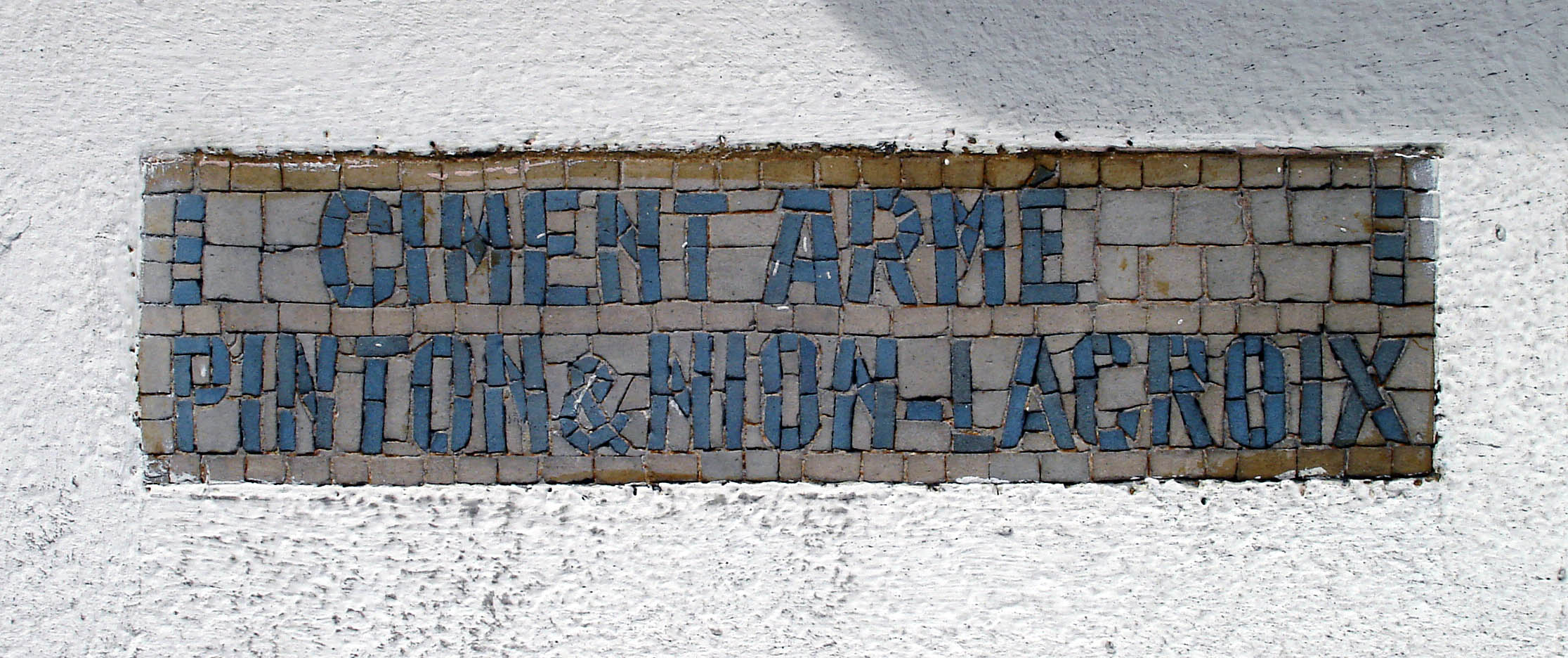
A mosaic with the names of the builders Pinton and Nion-Lacroix at one of the stations on the line.

The stations on the line contain platforms measuring 75 metres (246 ft) in length, and can accommodate five car trains like the main line 3 it once was part of. The line was constructed at a considerable depth below the surface, with the platforms at Pelleport, Saint-Fargeau, and Porte des Lilas lying between 19 metres (62 ft) and 25 metres (82 ft) below the surface, and only accessible by elevators. The architect Charles Plumet was charged with designing the outside entrances to the Pelleport, Saint-Fargeau, and Porte des Lilas stations.

Taking into consideration criticism of stations along other lines that required passengers to first descend to an area where tickets could be purchased, and then further descend to the platforms, Plumet designed the stations such that the elevators are accessible directly from the surface. The three stations are made of reinforced concrete and ciment de Grenoble; they are decorated with ceramics made by Gentil & Bourdet. The contractors of the station were Pinton and Nion Lacroix.

=== Connections ===
The line contains two connections with the rest of the network:

- with Line 3, at the northern side of the terminus Gambetta, on the tracks in the direction of Porte des Lilas;
- with Line 7bis, at the exit of the terminus Porte des Lilas, on the tracks in the direction of Gambetta.

The latter connection consists of the original two tracks that were originally intended to connect lines 3 and 7.

In the direction of lines 3 towards line 7, the tunnel "Voie navette" runs from Pré-Saint-Gervais to Porte des Lilas. A shuttle operated along these tracks until it was closed shortly before the start of World War II.

In the opposite direction, the tunnel "Voie des Fêtes", begins at the station Place des Fêtes, and ends at the station Haxo. Haxo was never opened to the public, and its pedestrian accesses were never built.

These two sets of tracks reunite in Porte des Lilas, and are often used for filming movies.

=== Service depots ===
The rolling stock of line 3bis is kept along with that of line 3 at the depot at Saint-Fargeau, accessible at Gambetta station.

Repairs and regular maintenance (e.g. of batteries, electrical wiring, and paint) are carried out at the depot at Choisy, along with the rest of the Paris rail network. Opened in 1931, it is situated in the 13th arrondissement, close to the Boulevard Périphérique and accessible via a branch off line 7. The depot is split into two: one part maintains the line 7 (AMT) trains, and the other renovates all metro trains. The depot occupies a total area of about 3.435 hectares (8.5 acres). 330 staff were employed at this depot in 2007.

== Operation ==
=== Service ===
In 2010, a complete trip along the line took only four minutes. As on the principal lines on the metro network, the first departures are at about 5:30 am (5:27 am from Porte des Lilas and 5:32 am from Gambetta); the last departures are at 1:04 am from Porte des Lilas and at 1:11 am from Gambetta, except on Friday and Saturday nights and holidays. Despite the light traffic on the line, the service interval is short: on average 3 to 5 minutes during the day and 8 to 9 minutes late at night; 6 to 8 minutes on Sunday mornings and about 10 minutes on Friday and Saturday nights (after 1:15 am) and holidays (after 12:30 am).

=== Rolling stock ===
Two MF 67s cross paths at the station Saint-Fargeau (video)

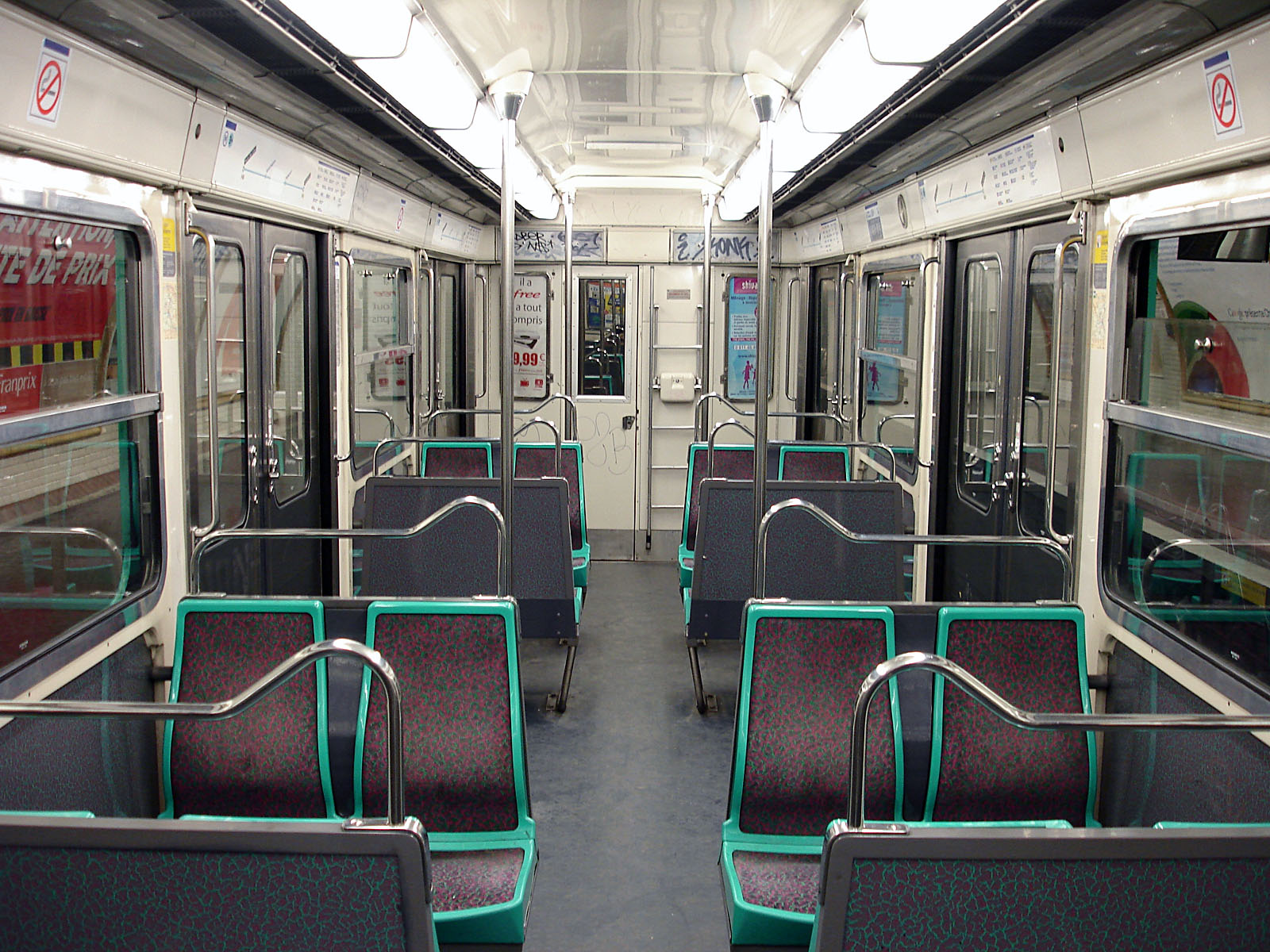
The MF 67 trains on line 3bis do not include fold-down seats (strapontins). This is due to the relatively light traffic on the line.

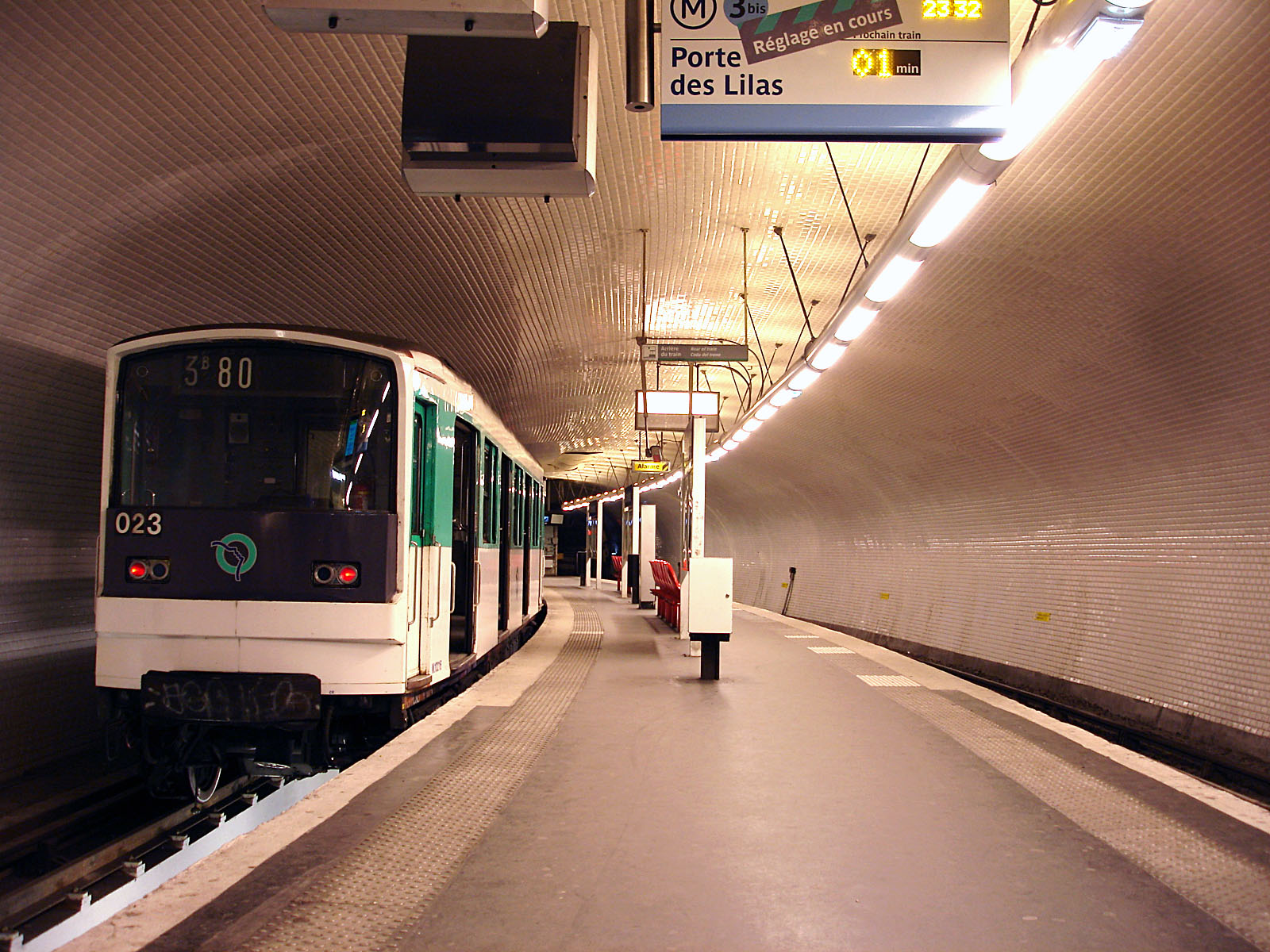
An MF 67 parked at Gambetta, the southern terminus of the line

Until 1971, the rolling stock on line 3bis was the same as on line 3. Between 1972 and July 1981, the Sprague-Thomson variant was used, but this was then replaced with MF 67 trains of only three cars (because of the low passenger volumes), which still run on the line today. These trains are identical to those that once equipped line 9, except that the 3bis trains do not have strapontins (fold-down seats). By 2027, the MF 67 trains will be replaced by the brand new MF 19 trains.

=== Employees ===
Employees on the network are divided into two categories: station agents and conductors. Station agents are responsible for selling tickets, ensuring that passengers have not entered the metro illegally (i.e. preventing fare evasion), managing the stations, and ensuring the proper installation of instructional signs and other fixtures according to service needs. Some agents are at times relieved from their normal duties so that they can operate the ticket booth. Conductors, on the other hand, ensure the proper operation of the trains. Service is broken down into three shifts: day, mixed, and night.

=== Fares and financing ===
Fares are identical to those on the rest of the metropolitan network; the line is accessible by the same transit subscriptions. A ticket t+ allows for a one-way trip on the line, regardless of the number of connections made with other metro lines or the RER (so long as the RER is taken only within the city of Paris, meaning Paris intra-muros).

The financing of the operation of the line is guaranteed by the RATP. Fares and subscription prices are regulated by the government and in fact their revenues do not cover the entire operating costs of the network. The difference is made up with funding provided by Île-de-France Mobilités (IDFM), presided over since 2005 by the President of the Regional Council of Île-de-France and governed by locally elected officials. The organisation defines the general conditions of operation including the duration and frequency of services. The operational budget is guaranteed by an annual subsidy provided to the general transportation network of the region; this subsidy is funded by a tax (the versement transport (VT), which is imposed on all companies in the region that employ more than nine people, as well as other public funds.

=== Traffic ===
The traffic along Line 3bis is included with the statistics of Line 3, which are presented below:

Year	1992	1993	1994	1995	1996	1997	1998	1999	2000	2001	2002	2003	2004
Number of Passengers(in millions)	88.1	87.1	87.2	76.3	83.3	84.5	85.3	87.6	93.2	95.9	94.2	90.6	87.6

== Projects ==
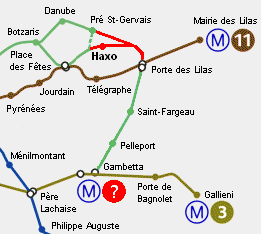
Blueprint of the proposed merger of lines 3bis and 7bis.

The proposed merger with Line 7bis was postponed indefinitely in March 2013. In October 2013, it was rescheduled in principle for 2030. Such a merger might involve the reopening of the Voie des Fêtes and the Voie navette, eventually allowing for the opening of the ghost station Haxo, but forcing RATP to find a new solution for film shooting.

== Tourism ==
Line 3bis serves only four stations in the 20th arrondissement of Paris.

== See also ==
- Paris
- Transport in Paris
- Paris Metro
- List of Paris Metro stations
- Architecture of the Paris Metro
- Merger of Paris Metro lines 3bis and 7bis
- Ghost stations of the Paris Metro
- List of metro systems
- Rail transport in France
