= Pelleport station =

Metro station in Paris, France

Pelleport
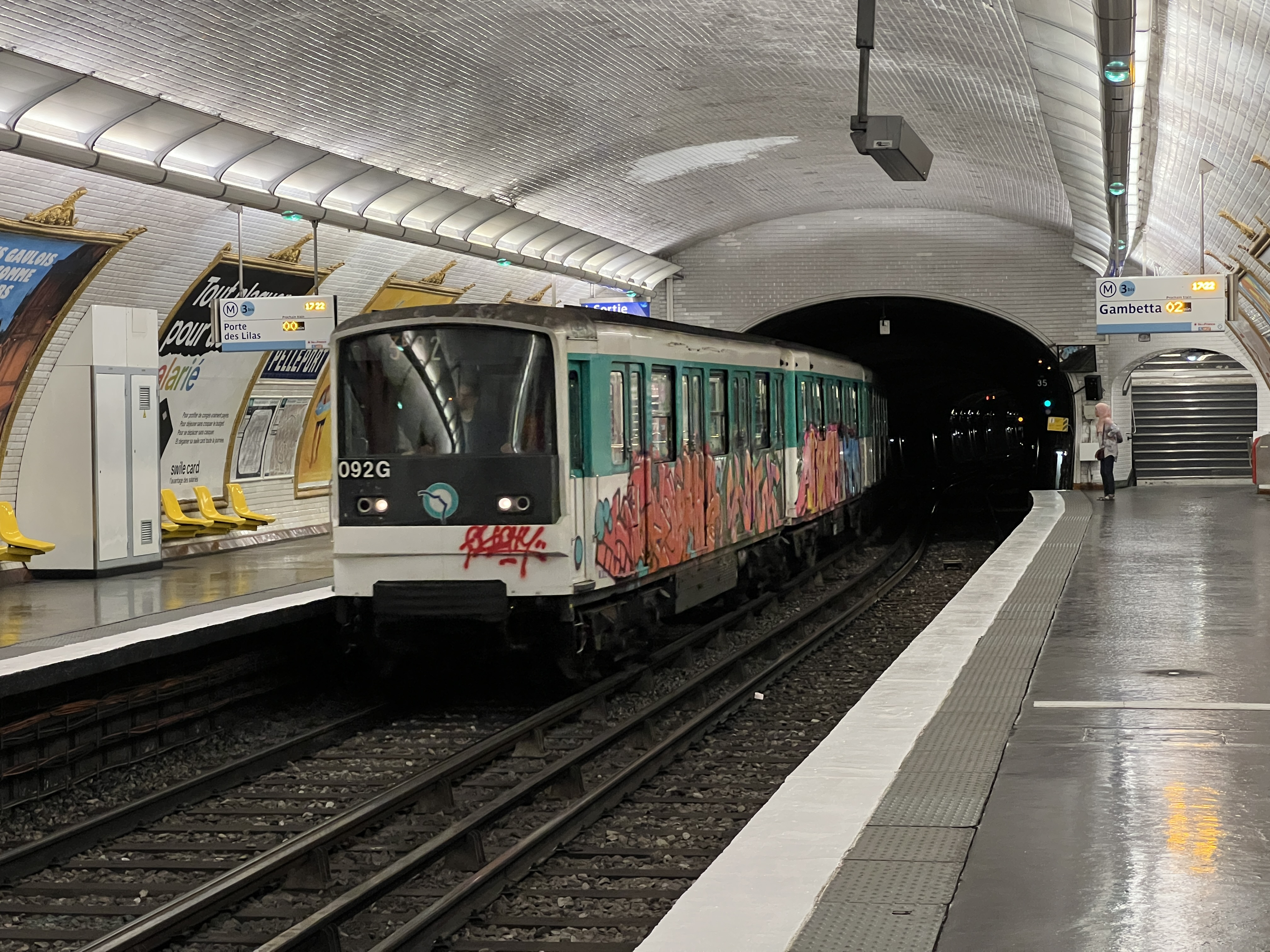

General information
- Location: Place Paul Signac; 20th arrondissement of Paris; Île-de-France; France
- Coordinates: 48°52′07″N 2°24′06″E
- System: Paris Metro station
- Owner: RATP
- Operator: RATP

Other information
- Fare zone: 1

History
- Opened: 17 November 1921

Services
Preceding station	Paris Metro	Following station
Gambetta Terminus	Line 3bis	Saint-Fargeau towards Porte des Lilas
Location
- Location within Paris

Pelleport (French pronunciation: [pɛlpɔʁ]) is a station of the Paris Metro, serving Line 3bis. It was opened on 27 November 1921 when Line 3 was extended from Gambetta to Porte des Lilas. On 27 March 1971, it was transferred to Line 3bis upon the establishment of the line.

== History ==
The station opened on November 27, 1921 with the entry into service of the extension of line 3 from Gambetta to Porte des Lilas.

It owes its name to its location at the intersection with Rue Pelleport, which pays homage to 19th-century military leader Viscount Pierre de Pelleport (1773-1855) who was a major general. He was seriously wounded at the Battle of Eylau in 1807, and served in the armies of the Restoration before being appointed to the Chamber of Peers in 1841.

From 1940, under the Occupation, the chief supervisor of the station Lucien Noël set up a network of resistance fighters. He was arrested in October of the following year and shot on January 24, 1942 at the fortress of Mont-Valérien.

On March 27, 1971, the station was transferred to Line 3bis, which resulted from the isolation of the section between Gambetta and Porte des Lilas of Line 3 in the form of an independent line, following the extension of the first to Gallieni.

As part of RATP's Renouveau du métro program, the station corridors and platform lighting were renovated on May 19, 2006.

In 2019, 329,597 passengers passed through the station which placed it at 302nd position out 302 for its usage.

== Passenger services ==
=== Access ===
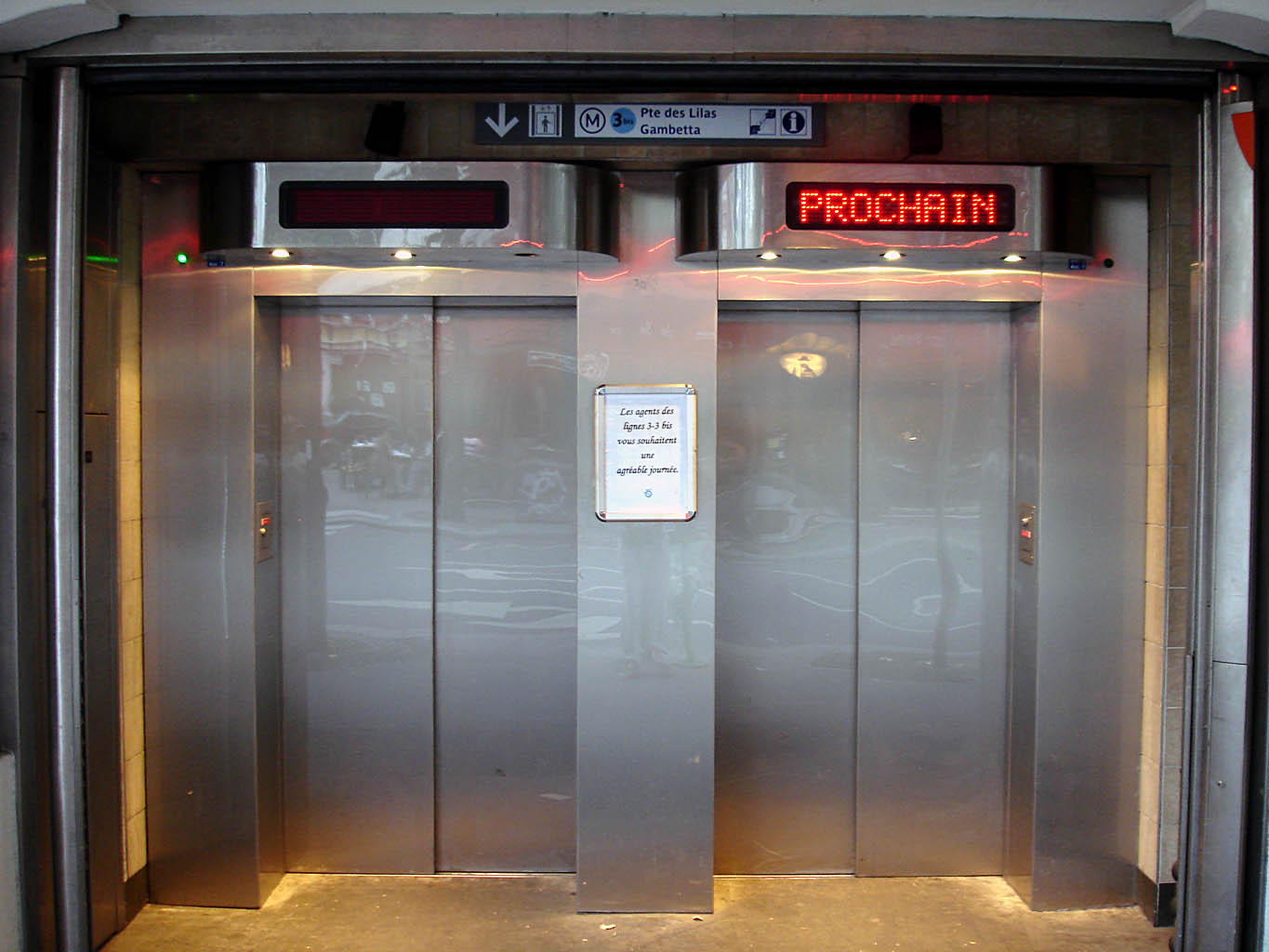
Lifts to Line 3bis at Pelleport station

The station has a single entrance called "Place Paul-Signac", leading to the said place facing Avenue Gambetta in the form of an original entrance with bas reliefs and earthenware decoration, designed in 1922 by Charles Plumet, particularity that it only shares with the Saint-Fargeau and Porte des Lilas stations on the same line. Due to the great depth of the platforms, it has two elevators surrounded by fixed stairs.

=== Station layout ===
Street Level

B1	Mezzanine

Line 3bis platforms	Side platform, doors will open on the right
Line 3bis platforms	Southbound	← toward Gambetta (Terminus)
Line 3bis platforms	Northbound	toward Porte des Lilas (Saint-Fargeau) →
Line 3bis platforms	Side platform, doors will open on the right

=== Platforms ===
Pelleport is a standard configuration station. It has two platforms separated by the metro tracks and the vault is elliptical. The decoration is of the style used for the majority of metro stations. The lighting fixtures are white and rounded in the Gaudin style of the metro revival of the 2000s, and the bevelled white ceramic tiles cover the upright walls, the vault and the tunnel exits. The advertising frames are honey-colored earthenware and the name of the station is also earthenware in the original CMP style. The seats are Motte style in yellow.

With the exception of the colour of the seats, this decoration is completely identical to that of the neighboring station, Saint-Fargeau.

=== Bus connections ===
The station is served by lines 60, 61 and 64 of the RATP bus network.
