= Paris Metro Line 7bis =

Subway route in the French capital

Line 7bis
- Paris Metro Line 7bis
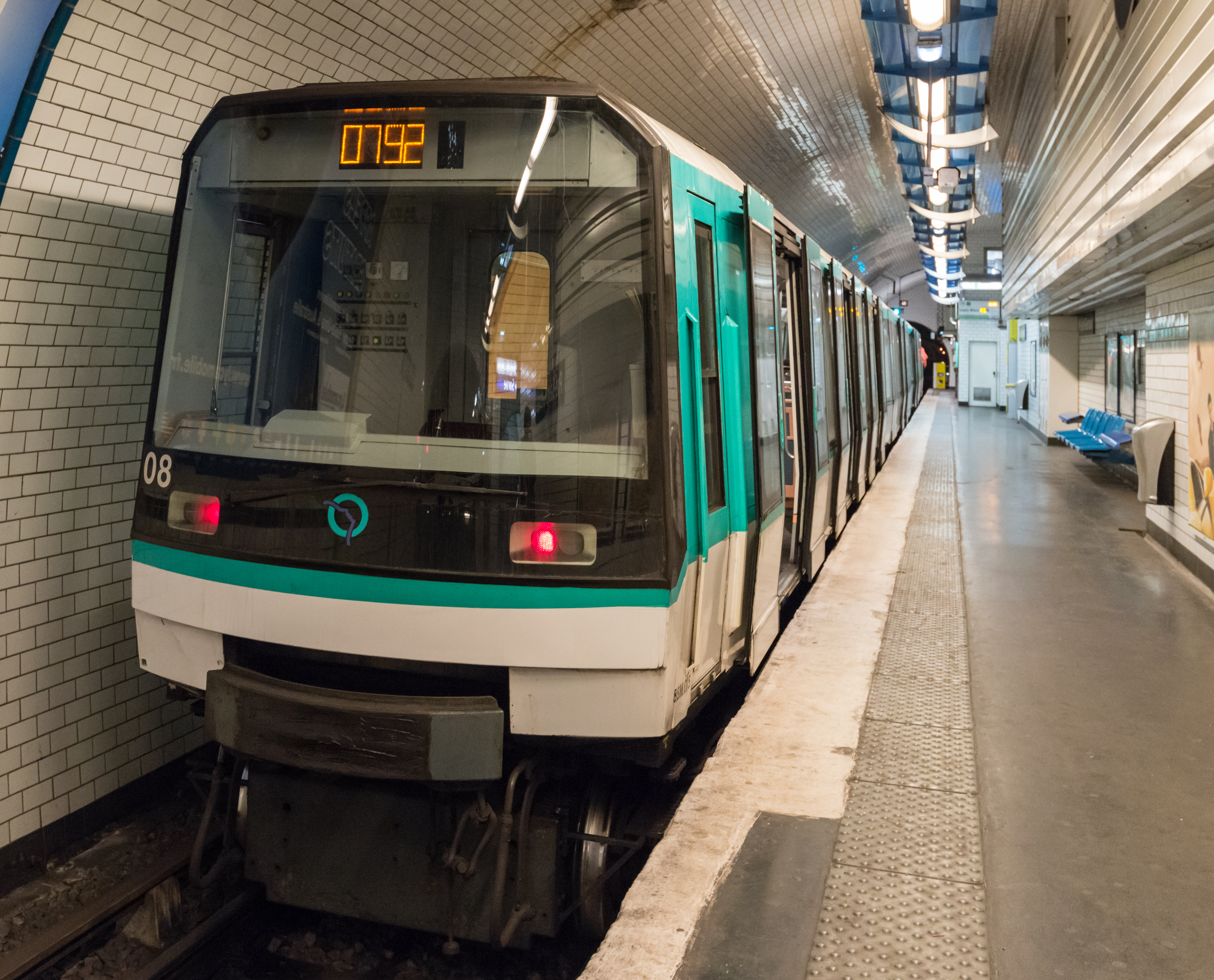
- MF 88 train at Pré-Saint-Gervais

Overview
- Locale: Paris
- Termini: Louis Blanc; Pré-Saint-Gervais
- Connecting lines: Paris Metro Paris Metro Line 2 Paris Metro Line 5 Paris Metro Line 7 Paris Metro Line 11 Tramways in Île-de-France Île-de-France tramway Line 3b
- Stations: 8

Service
- System: Paris Metro
- Operator: RATP
- Rolling stock: MF 88 (7 trains as of 14 November 2026)
- Ridership: 3 million (avg. per year); 15th/16

History
- Opened: 3 December 1967; 58 years ago

Technical
- Line length: 3.1 km (1.9 mi)
- Track gauge: 1,435 mm (4 ft 8 1/2 in) standard gauge
- Electrification: 750 V DC third rail

Paris Metro Line 7bis is one of the sixteen subway lines currently open on the Paris Metro. It connects Louis Blanc, in the 10th arrondissement to Pré Saint-Gervais in the 19th arrondisement in the north-eastern part of the city. With a length of 3.1 kilometres (1.9 mi) and eight stations, the line is the second shortest on the Paris Metro, only longer than Line 3bis.

The line was opened in 1911, then operating as a branch of Line 7. However, due to a large difference in passenger numbers between this branch and the other Line 7 branch (then operating from Louis Blanc to the Porte de La Vilette station), the Pré-Saint-Gervais branch was separated from Line 7, forming the current Line 7bis.

== Chronology ==
Geographically accurate path of Paris Metro Line 7bis.

- 18 January 1911: The section between Louis Blanc and Pré-Saint-Gervais was opened as a branch of Line 7.
- 3 December 1967 : Because of a lack of traffic compared to the other branch, the Pré-Saint-Gervais branch became a separate line known as Line 7bis.
- 1993–1994: line 7bis becomes the first (and only) line equipped with MF 88 trains, prototype to the MP89 trains currently on service on Line 6.
- 2026: MF88 trains will be removed from service and replaced with the new MF19 trains.

== Tourism ==
Metro Line 7bis serves the Parc des Buttes Chaumont.

== Future ==
In December 2026, the MF88 are scheduled to be replaced by new MF19 trains which entered in service on Line 10 in September 2025.

The merger with Line 3bis, connected through an existing rail tunnel and allowing the opening of a closed station (Haxo), is being studied. Line 7bis would be extended one station west to have its terminus at Château-Landon. The proposed merger of the lines was postponed indefinitely in March 2013. In October 2013, it was rescheduled in principle for 2030. This project, however, requires to be set after the trains' replacement as the Voie Navette is currently used for MF88 train maintenance, preventing its use for public transportation purposes. It also is blocked by the current use of Voie Navette and the merger Porte des Lilas station by RATP for movie shootings.

== See also ==
- List of Paris Metro stations
- List of Réseau Express Régional stations
