= MF 88 =

Paris Metro train

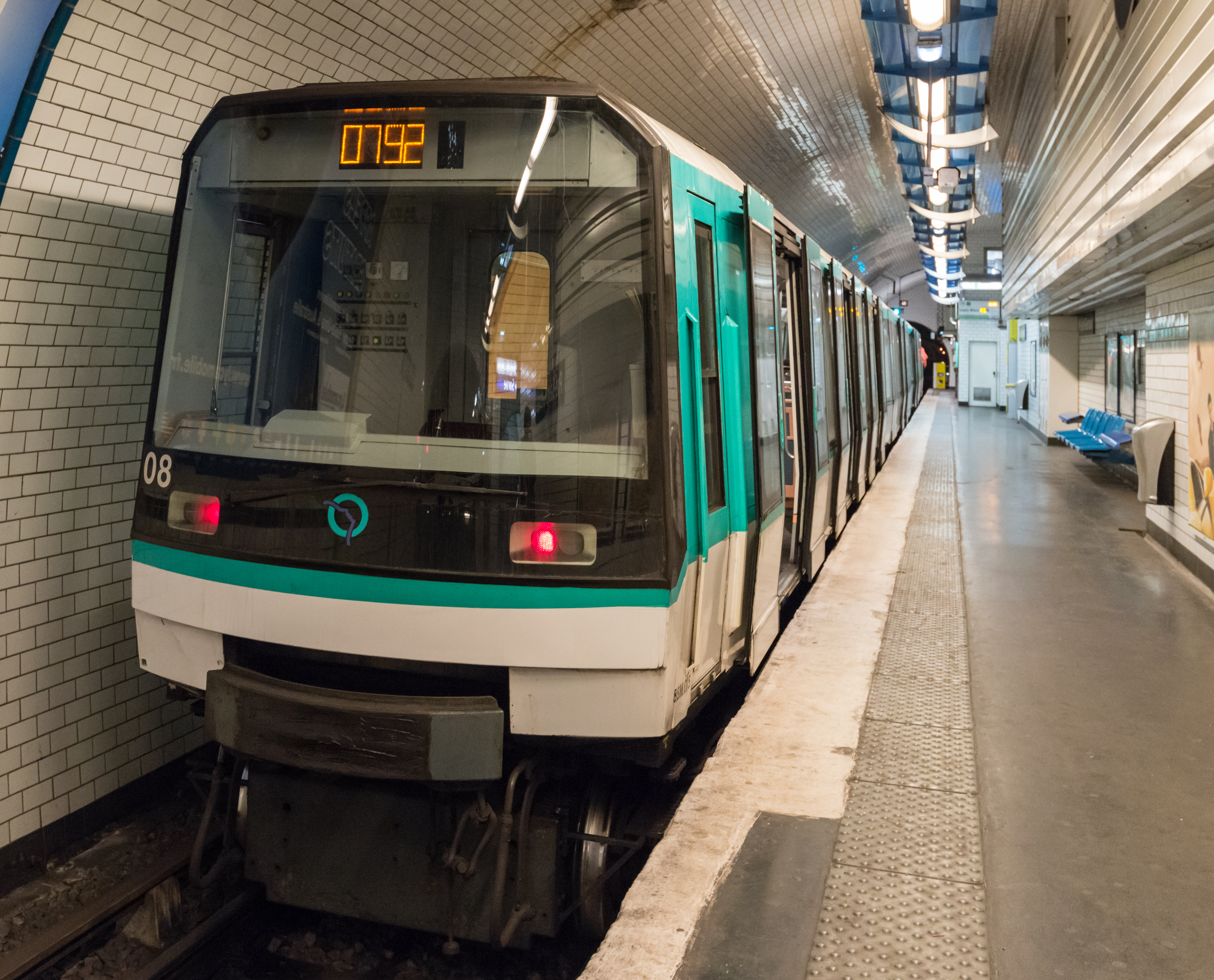
- MF 88 trainset at Pré-Saint-Gervais station on Line 7bis.

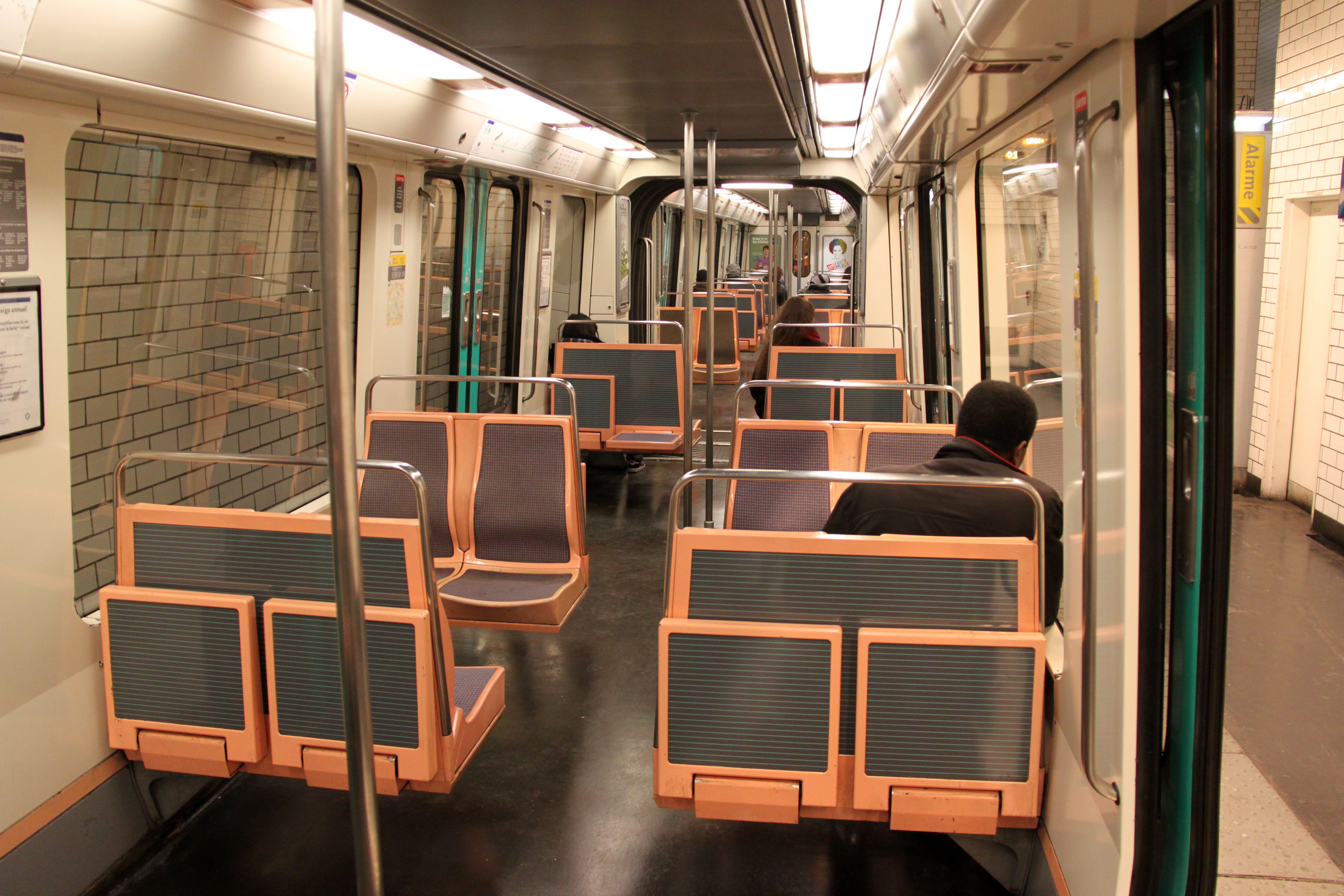
- Interior of MF 88 trainset
- In service: 1993–present
- Manufacturers: GEC Alsthom, Faiveley, Renault, ANF
- Replaced: Sprague-Thomson
- Constructed: 1990–1992
- Scrapped: 2013 (2027 after replaced by MF19)
- Number built: 27 cars (9 trainsets)
- Number scrapped: 3 cars (1 trainset)
- Successor: MF 19
- Formation: 3 cars per trainset
- Capacity: 425 people per trainset
- Operator: RATP
- Line served: Paris Metro Paris Metro Line 7bis

Specifications
- Train length: 45.44 m (149 ft 1 in)
- Car length: 15.15 m (49 ft 8 in)
- Maximum speed: Design: 80 km/h (50 mph); Service: 70 km/h (43 mph) (Initial) 40 km/h (25 mph) (Current)
- Traction system: GEC Alsthom GTO-VVVF
- Traction motors: 3-phase AC induction motor type 4ELA 2552
- Power output: 840 kW (1,130 hp)
- Deceleration: 0.9 m/s^{2} (2.0 mph/s) (Service); 1.1 m/s^{2} (2.5 mph/s) (Emergency)
- Electric systems: Third rail, 750 V DC
- Current collection: Contact shoe
- UIC classification: (1A)A′+1′1′+A′(A1)
- Track gauge: 1,435 mm (4 ft 8 1/2 in) standard gauge

The MF 88 (French: Métro Fer appel d'offres de 1988; English: Steel-wheeled metro ordered in 1988) is a steel-wheel variant of electric multiple units used on the Paris Metro. The RATP contracted a consortium of manufacturers, with Ateliers du Nord de la France in charge of the project.

They were built following successful tests of a prototype train set called the "BOA", derived from the MF 77, which tested new features such as open gangway connections between the cars to improve passenger distribution, and special bogies to reduce friction caused by the many sharp curves found in the Metro network. The MF 88 introduced a number of innovations in its time, including the use of 3-phase AC induction motors, and an on-board computer system using a new standard integrated computing architecture. It is planned for the MF 19 CC rolling stock to replace the MF 88 in 2026.

In October 2026, RATP announced that the MF 88 will be officially withdrawn from service on December 12, 2026.

== Design ==
Carrying on the features of the BOA, a total of nine MF 88 train-sets were built, which have only ever operated on Line 7bis in a three-car formation. It was the first model with AC motors as opposed to DC, supplied by GEC-Alsthom, and the first to have interconnecting gangways between the passenger cars. The MF 88 was also the first to adopt a new computing architecture, developed by TechnicAtome, over relay-based systems used in older Paris Metro rolling stock. It was also the last model not newly built with automatic digital voice announcements and with user-activated doors (all subsequent models, as well as more recently the MF 77s on Line 13, have had all doors open at once). However, automatic announcements were later added in the mid-2020's.

The MF 88 introduced an independent-wheeled steering axle design, which was intended to reduce friction caused by the sharp curves found in the Metro network. However, this turned out to cause several problems for the RATP, and was not adopted in subsequent Paris Metro rolling stock designs. This design was causing excessive wear on the track due to a defect in the chassis, where each intermediate bogie only has one axle with two wheels, similar to a typical car, bus, some rubber-tyred trains (although the rubber-tyred lines of the Paris Métro use the typical 2-axle, 4-wheel bogies), or certain railbuses, but unusual for a more “standard” railcar, especially one powered by electricity. The high rate of wear-and-tear of the train-sets has made maintenance much more expensive than expected.

== Technical specifications ==
- Manufacturers: GEC Alsthom, Faiveley, Renault, ANF
- Electric source: Third rail, 750 V DC
- Traction: Gate turn-off thyristor (GTO)
- Power: 2 motors per motor coach with 210 kW (280 hp) each, 840 kW (1,130 hp) total per train
- Maximum operating speed: 70 km/h (43 mph), currently reduced to 40 km/h (25 mph) due to rolling stock's condition
- Bogies: Bi-directional
- Length: 46.44 metres (152 ft 4 11/32 in)

Arrival of a MF 88 on Line 7bis

Departure of a MF 88 on Line 7bis

== Formations ==
As of 1 September 2022, eight MF 88 trainsets were in service and were formed as shown below. One train was scrapped in 2013.

As of 1 March 2022, eight trainsets are allocated to Pré Saint-Gervais depot for use on Line 7bis.

	<- Louis Blanc / Pré Saint-Gervais ->		
Car No.	1	2	3
Type	M	T	M
Designation	88M.xxx	88B. xxx	88M. xxx
Equipment	VVVF	CP, SIV	VVVF
