= MA 51 =

Paris Metro train, 1951-1994

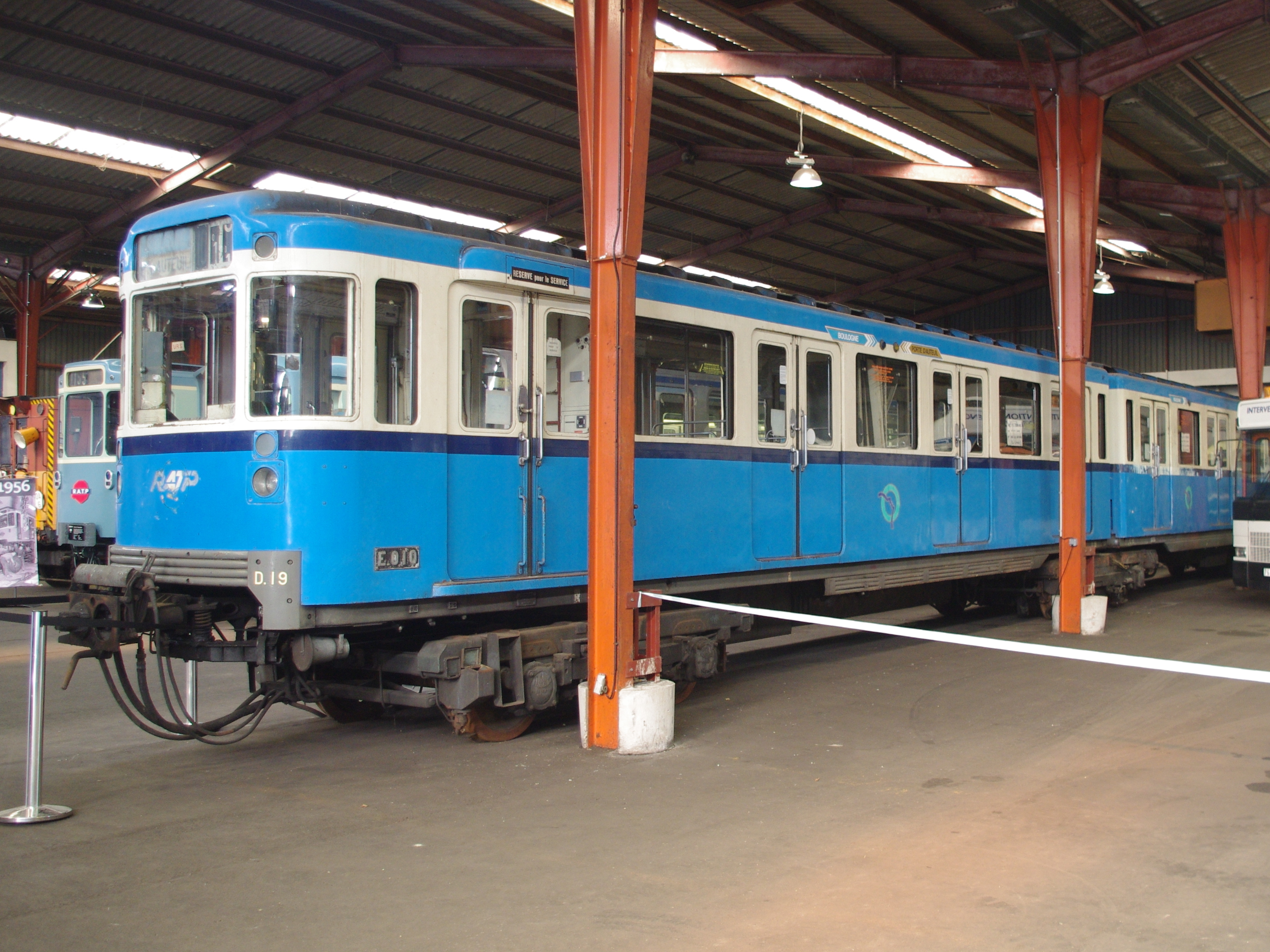
A preserved example of the MA.

The Matériel Articulé (MA) Appel d'offres 1951, also known as the MA 51 or the MA 52, was a subway train used on the Paris Metro network between 1951 and 1994.

== Conception ==
The MA rolling stock was a result of research conducted by the Compagnie du chemin de fer métropolitain de Paris (CMP) and the Régie Autonome des Transports Parisiens (RATP) during the 1940 in response to the then-used Sprague-Thomson rolling stock being considered heavy and outdated. The company envisioned a rolling stock that was lighter and equipped with the Jeumon-Heidmann (JH) system used on the Sceaux Line since 1938. In addition, the company hoped to improve the trains' braking abilities. The most-used solution at the time was a rolling stock with a common bogie between two cars.

At the same time, the company also desired to employ modular trains that could be expanded during peak hours. Lines equipped with stations of at least 75 metres (82 yd) supported trains with two trainsets and those with stations of at least 105 metres (115 yd) supported trains with three trainsets. An overall extension project of all stations' lengths to 105 metres (115 yd) began in 1931, yet was never completed: Lines 2, 3, 5, 6, 10, 11 and 12, were left untouched. All extension projects include that extended length, including on these lines.

== Description ==
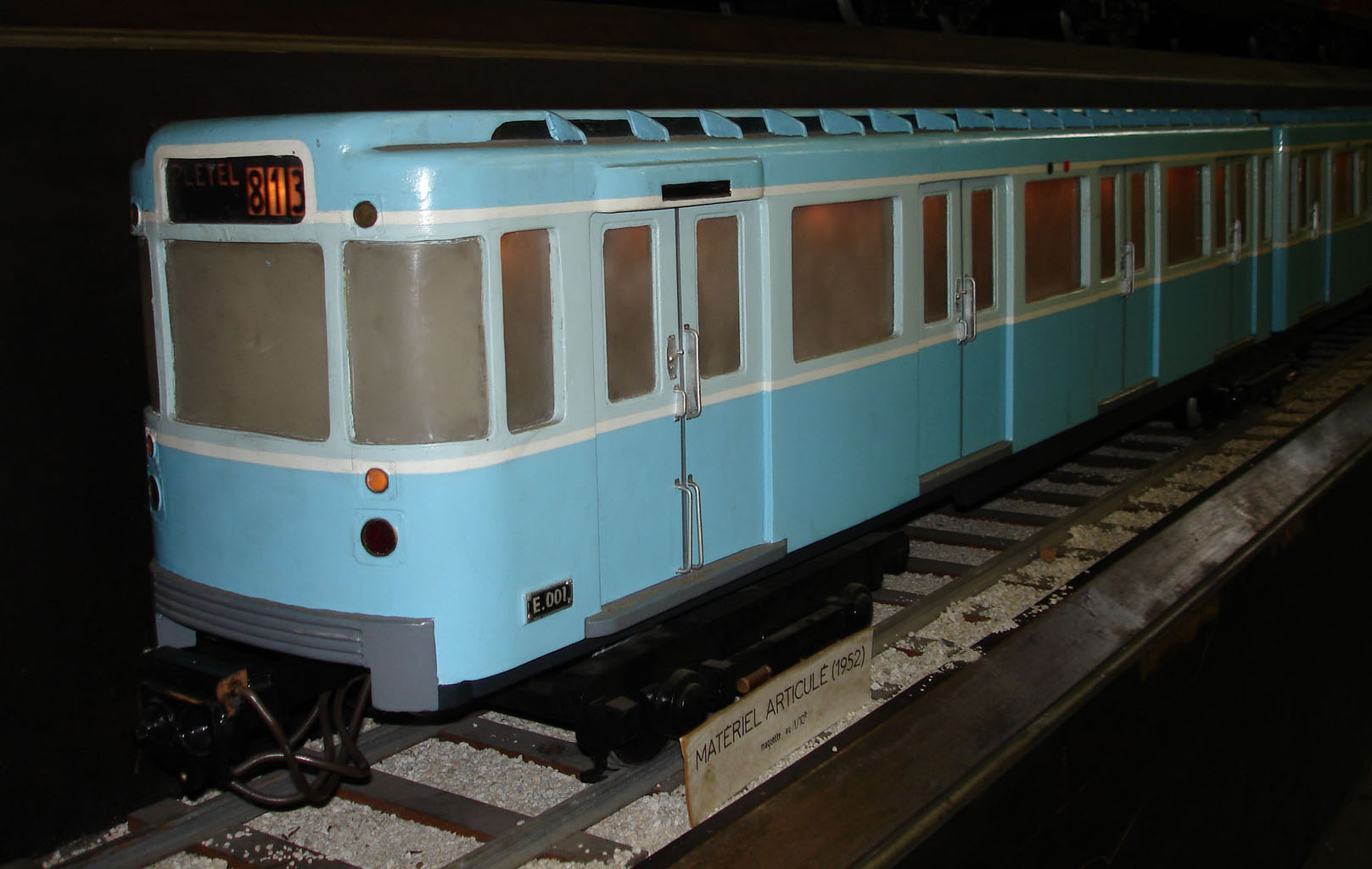
Model of an MA at the Musée des transports urbains, interurbains et ruraux, depicting its original grayish-blue livery.

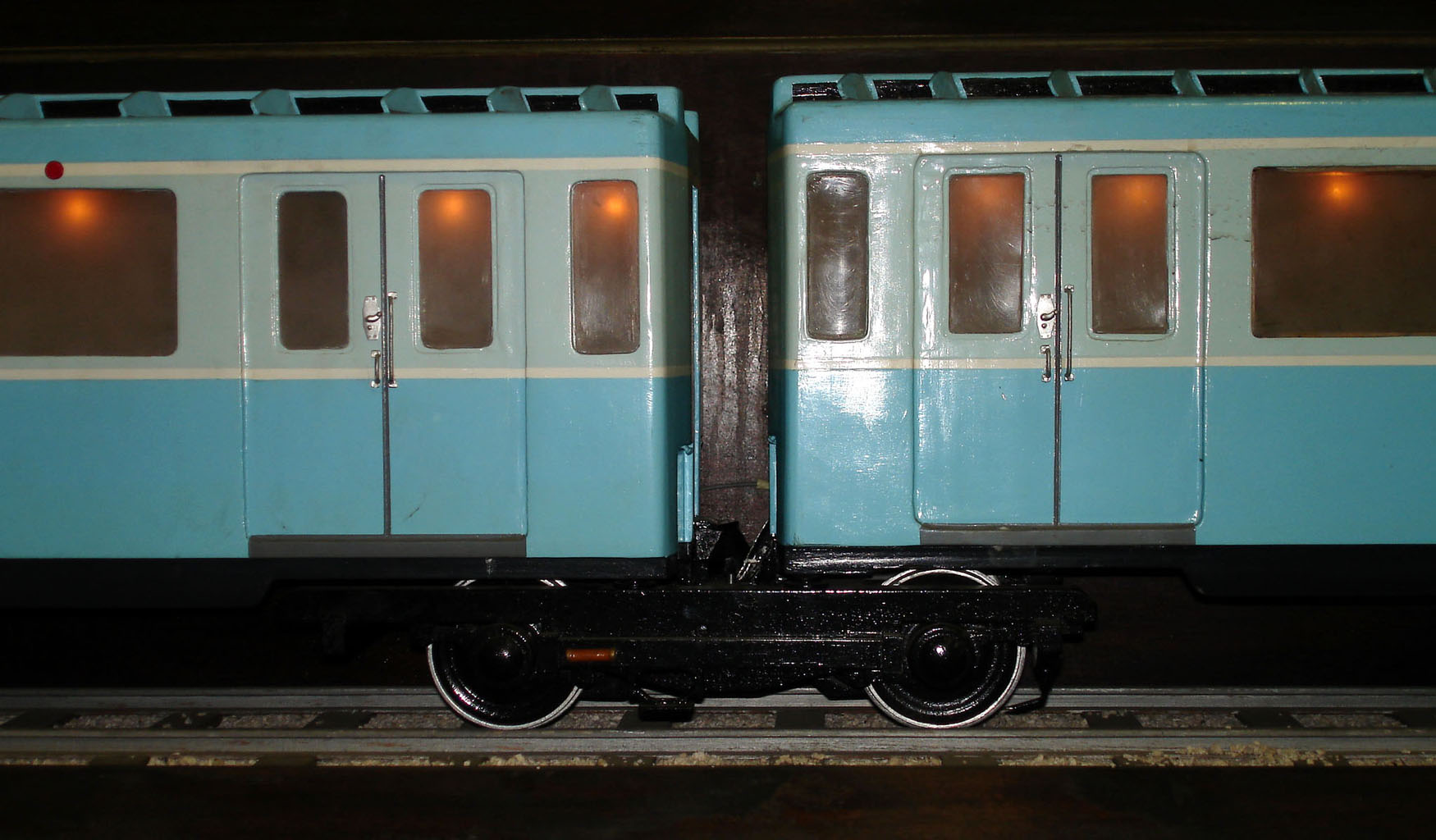
The same MA scale model, displaying its articulated bogie connector between cars.

Each trainset consisted of three body sections resting on four bogies. The central section was shorter than the rest and in 1952 was designated as a first class car. The trainset were equipped with Scharfenberg automatic couplings, which allowed quick trainset coupling and uncoupling.

Seats were divided into two classes, and fluorescent lighting was used. Folding seats were used at each end to increase the number of available passenger seats.

The initial livery was grayish-blue across all cars. However, with the introduction of first class in the 1950s, the RATP had first class cars in the middle colored red, a trend that did not catch on. RATP eventually incorporated yellow into the color scheme, between gray and blue bands.

The model is unusual in that the driving cab could double as passenger accommodation. A door existed which, when opened, allowed access to the control panel. A folding seat was attached to the side of the door, allowing for the conductor to be seated. When the door was closed, it hid the control panel allowing additional passenger space.

== MA on Line 13 ==
RATP decided to place the MA on Line 13, a forked line whose branches were poorly serviced during off-peak hours and which also had a terminus newly adapted to the MA rolling stock. Trains circulated with two coupled trainsets during peak hours and single trainsets during off-peak hours.

Ordered late, the MA arrived on line 13 in 1952, allowing for line 13's extension from Porte de Saint-Ouen to Carrefour Pleyel.

The MA rolling stock was as loud as its Sprague-Thomson predecessor. It was equipped with a modulated pneumatic braking system that was deemed acceptable in 1952, then declared outdated in the 1960s. RATP lost interest in using only pneumatic braking on cars and as a result the MP 51 was put in service.

Decoupling was abandoned in 1972. The MA rolling stock continued serving on line 13 during its expansion to Champs-Élysées, but the sets were transferred to Line 10 between 1975 and 1976 in order to make way for the merging of Lines 13 and then-14 as well as a new upcoming rolling stock, the MF 77, still used today despite its upcoming replacement to the brand new MF 19 expected by 2030.

== MA on Line 10 ==
Because the metro network still contained many Sprague-model stock in 1974, the RATP decided not to eliminate the MA but instead to modernize it and use it on a line experiencing only light traffic. As a result, the trains were renovated and put in service on Line 10 with six cars permanently attached. A new dark-blue livery was applied, similar to that of the then-new MP 73.

First class was moved to a long body section and lighting followed that of the MP 73. The interior walls contained a blue tint adopted by the MP 73 as well as the new MF 67 E&F. During the 1980s, the door that hid the control panel was removed and the cabins were occupied only by RATP conductors. This resulted in the largest driving cabin of the network at the time.

Unable to accommodate autopilot and equipped with brakes that proved too delicate for steel rail tracks, the MA's replacement with newer rolling stock became inevitable. Replacement of the MA with MF 67 trains began in 1988 and was completed in 1994, with the last MA train serving on June 15. These MF 67 trains came to line 10 from Line 7bis (which then received the MF 88), and are only replaced nowadays with the arrival of the brand new MF 19. Two MA trainsets have been preserved - one by the RATP and the other by ADEMAS, a French association of railway enthusiasts.
