= Paris Metro Line 10 =

Subway route in the French capital

Line 10
- Paris Metro Line 10
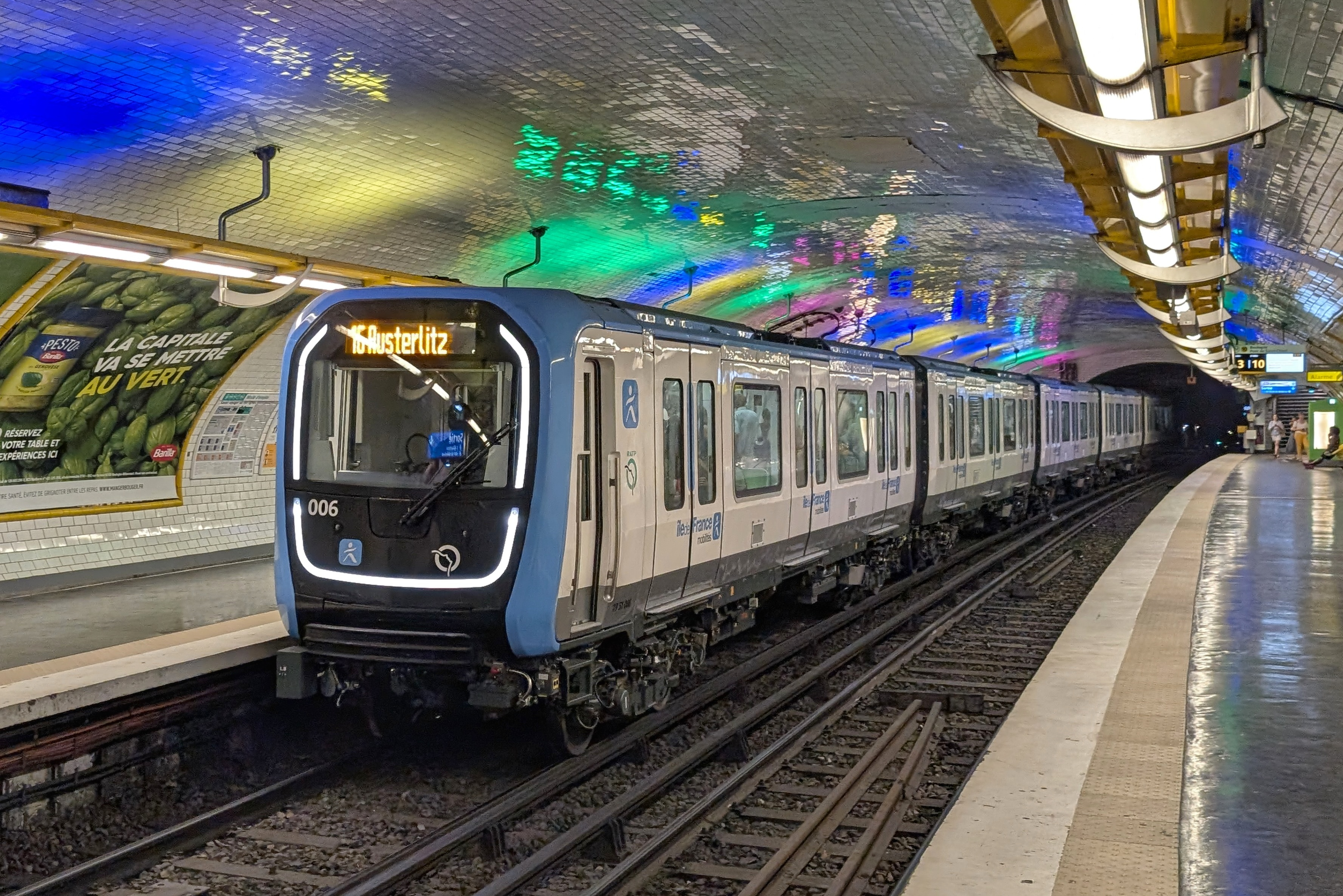
- MF 19 at Odéon station

Overview
- Termini: Boulogne – Pont de Saint-Cloud; Gare d'Austerlitz
- Connecting lines: Paris Metro Paris Metro Line 4 Paris Metro Line 5 Paris Metro Line 6 Paris Metro Line 7 Paris Metro Line 8 Paris Metro Line 9 Paris Metro Line 12 Paris Metro Line 13 RER RER B RER C Tramways in Île-de-France Île-de-France tramway Line 2
- Stations: 23

Service
- System: Paris Métro
- Operator: RATP
- Rolling stock: MF 67 (25 trains as of 14 November 2026); MF 19 (7 trains as of 14 November 2026)
- Ridership: 44,000,000 (avg. per year); 14th/16

History
- Opened: 30 December 1923; 102 years ago

Technical
- Line length: 11.7 km (7.3 mi)
- Track gauge: 1,435 mm (4 ft 8 1/2 in) standard gauge
- Electrification: 750 V DC third rail
- Conduction system: Conductor

Paris Metro Line 10 is one of the sixteen currently open métro lines in Paris, France. The line links Boulogne–Pont de Saint-Cloud, in Boulogne-Billancourt, to the Gare d'Austerlitz, traveling under the rather bourgeois neighborhoods of the Rive Gauche — the southern half of Paris — the 16th arrondissement and the neighbouring commune of Boulogne-Billancourt.

The line runs entirely underground and stretches 11.7 kilometres (7.3 mi) across 23 stations. It has the least traffic of the fourteen main metro lines, excluding lines 3bis and 7bis.

Initially, the MA 51 model trains, which had previously been used on Line 13 until it absorbed former Line 14, circulated on the tracks of Line 10. These trains were first constructed with three cars on four bogies per train, and two trains permanently connected to make six cars per train, having an equivalent capacity to five cars on the classic metro trains. Because of the ineffectiveness of the MA 51 model, it was eventually completely replaced by the MF 67 model between 1988 and 1994.

The line's history is closely tied to that of lines 7, 8, and 13. A section of Line 10's route was replaced by Line 13, and Line 10 replaced part of Line 7 for more than a year, until eventually replacing the western section of Line 8 in 1937 when said line swapped termini from Porte d'Auteuil to Balard. Consequently, Line 10 has changed the most of any other Paris métro line during its lifetime. Unlike other lines, the walls of Line 10's tunnels are painted white, creating a brightness that is unique to the ochre line.

== Route and stations ==
Line 10 measures 11.712 kilometres (7.277 mi) across 23 stations and one ghost station, Croix-Rouge, located in between Sèvres–Babylone and Mabillon, which closed in 1939 at dawn of World War II, among many others – including Cluny–La Sorbonne – yet, unlike the latter, never reopened. The route is entirely underground.

Geographically accurate path of Paris Métro Line 10

=== List of stations ===
Beginning at the western terminus of Line 10, the first train that leaves the station Porte d'Auteuil heads towards the Gare d'Austerlitz, through the Auteuil Loop's turn-around track, which is then closed to passengers for the rest of the day. This allows an immediate departure at the start of the day – 5:30 AM – towards Gare d'Austerlitz, thus sparing passengers heading east from waiting until the arrival of the first train from Boulogne. SIEL, système d'information en ligne, is installed on every station of the network and gives passengers the expected time-to-arrival of the next two trains, a system that has been operational since 1 July 2008.

At the terminus Boulogne – Pont de Saint-Cloud (Rhin et Danube), because of the proximity to the Seine river west, there are no tracks behind the station to allow the train to reverse directions. Instead, trains are received alternately on each side of the platform, and leave directly in the opposite direction. Due to the rue du Château's narrowness, under which line 10 passes, the stations Boulogne – Pont de Saint-Cloud (Rhin et Danube) and Boulogne – Jean Jaurès have only one central platform used for both directions. After the latter station, tracks run for 1,600 metres (0.99 mi) to reconnect trains to the Auteuil loop. Trains headed towards Austerlitz must successively dive under the Boulevard Périphérique, followed by the platforms for the connections to Auteuil Workshops and Voie Murat before ascending back to service the station Michel – Ange – Molitor on its southern platform. In order to achieve this, ramps reaching a descent of up to a 40‰ grade are used. Tracks 2 (towards Boulogne) are separated by the loop on the level of the avenue du Général Sarrail with a bend and a slope of 40‰.

The loop to Auteuil is situated in the neighborhood of Auteuil: tracks 1 and 3 of the loop border the central platform of Miche-Ange – Molitor. Afterwards, they pass under the rails of line 9, until merging at the arrival to the single-platform Chardon-Lagache and Mirabeau stations, the latter where both directions connect back towards Austerlitz.

Tracks 2, coming from Austerlitz, follow a very peculiar profile and enter yet do not service the station Mirabeau, instead crossing behind it on top of a sharp ramp due to the great depth of the line after traversing the Seine. Furthermore, in order to reach the station Église d'Auteuil, the trains must climb even higher, very close to the station's foundation. Following this, tracks 2 of the line pass above tracks of line 9 and arrive at the southern platform of station Michel-Ange – Auteuil, while the northern one comes from a connection with line 9. Arriving at Porte d'Auteuil, the tracks separate to form the complex knot of tracks that head towards Boulogne, the Auteuil Workshops, the Voie Murat towards Porte Molitor and Porte de Saint-Cloud, or along the Autuil loop back towards Michel-Ange – Molitor.

After the station Mirabeau, the line crosses the Seine via an underwater tunnel and reaches the station Javel–André Citroën by way of a 40‰ ramp under tracks of RER line C. Line then follows avenue Émile-Zola to enter Charles Michels – the original westbound terminus of the line – and Avenue Émile Zola, before turning under the rue du Commerce alongside line 8. When the line reaches the station La Motte-Picquet – Grenelle, the two tracks separate : trains headed east are welcomed in the central platform of the original station, alongside line 8 trains headed east to Créteil, while trains headed to Boulogne service an adjacent half station located above the remaining platform, line 8 trains to Balard. After this complex knot caused by the line switch of 1937, line 10 trains enter the Rapp intake before arriving at the station Ségur. Line 10 then connects back to another of its original sections, the stations Duroc, Vaneau and Sèvres – Babylone, which were part of an early attempt at a subway rocade inside of Paris. Line 10 continues eastward through the ghost station Croix-Rouge, then Mabillon, under the station Saint-Germain-des-Prés on line 4.

From there on the route of line 10 becomes complicated as it must pass above line 4 to serve its next station, Odéon. The two tracks part right outside Odéon in order to yield passage to the connection tracks to Line 4, that level off at the station Cluny – La Sorbonne. The connection tracks rejoin the other tracks of line 10 right at the western entrance to the station Maubert–Mutualité... before splitting again right out its eastern entrance, this time to connect to line 7 underneath the station Cardinal Lemoine. Line 10 then turns a sharp left under the eponymous street, turning right to reach the station Jussieu alongside lines 7, their platforms side by side. Both lines bend left towards the Seine, yet line 10 follows with a sharp right under the Jardin des plantes to reach its current eastbound terminus, Gare d'Austerlitz. The arrival is situated under the arrivals hall of the train station on the surface, and the parking tracks are under the railroad tracks. This cul-de-sac is peculiar in the sense that it is configured to receive an underwater passing coming from the gare de Paris-Lyon.

=== Split section of line 10 ===
Line 10 has separate eastbound and westbound sections between Boulogne–Jean Jaurès station (west) and Javel–André Citroën station. Both sections run side by side between Javel–André Citroën station and Mirabeau, but the Mirabeau station is only served by eastbound trains. Westbound trains pass through Mirabeau on an inclined ramp behind the eastbound tracks.

Train Directions	Stations					
← Heading West, to Boulogne – Pont de Saint-Cloud ←	Boulogne–Pont de Saint-Cloud	← Porte d'Auteuil ←	← Michel-Ange–Auteuil ←	← Église d'Auteuil ←	← ~~Mirabeau~~ ← → Mirabeau →	Javel–André Citroën
→ Heading East, to Gare d'Austerlitz →	Boulogne–Pont de Saint-Cloud	→ ↳ → → →	→ Michel-Ange–Molitor →	→ Chardon Lagache →	← ~~Mirabeau~~ ← → Mirabeau →	Javel–André Citroën

Line 10's onboard diagram, featuring the Auteuil Loop and transfers

A train running the Boucle d'Auteuil, from Porte d'Auteuil to Michel-Ange–Molitor station

The separate sections were once part of a loop that returned westgoing trains to Javel–André Citroën. After Porte d'Auteuil (last station on the westbound section) the trains turned round to Michel-Ange–Molitor (first station on the eastbound section). When the line was extended towards Boulogne, the section was no longer operated as a loop, with only one departure per day – the earliest one – carrying on for earlier first departure back to Austerlitz.

Porte d'Auteuil is also connected with Porte de Saint-Cloud of line 9. This connection is called "voie Murat" and serves the ghost station Porte Molitor. Initial plans for the station was to connect a shuttle train to serve the Parc des Princes football stadium on match days and for special events, but plans were eventually discarded and pedestrian accesses to the station were never constructed. Westbound trains on line 10 (terminating at Porte d'Auteuil) can be re-routed to line 9, starting eastbound at Porte de Saint-Cloud via the "voie Murat" connection. This option is used after events at Parc des Princes when Line 9 is used by unusually many people.

On the same section, are located the access tracks heading towards the Auteuil workshops, where the Line 10 trains are stored and kept for maintenance.

=== Renamed stations ===
Five stations on line 10 have changed names of the course of the years:

- La Motte-Picquet became La Motte-Picquet – Grenelle in November 1913;
- Wilhem became Église d'Auteuil on 15 May 1921;
- Beaugrenelle became Charles Michels on 14 July 1945;
- Gare d'Orléans – Austerlitz became Gare d'Austerlitz in 1979;
- Cluny became Cluny – La Sorbonne on 17 February 1988.

=== Themed and otherwise unique stations ===
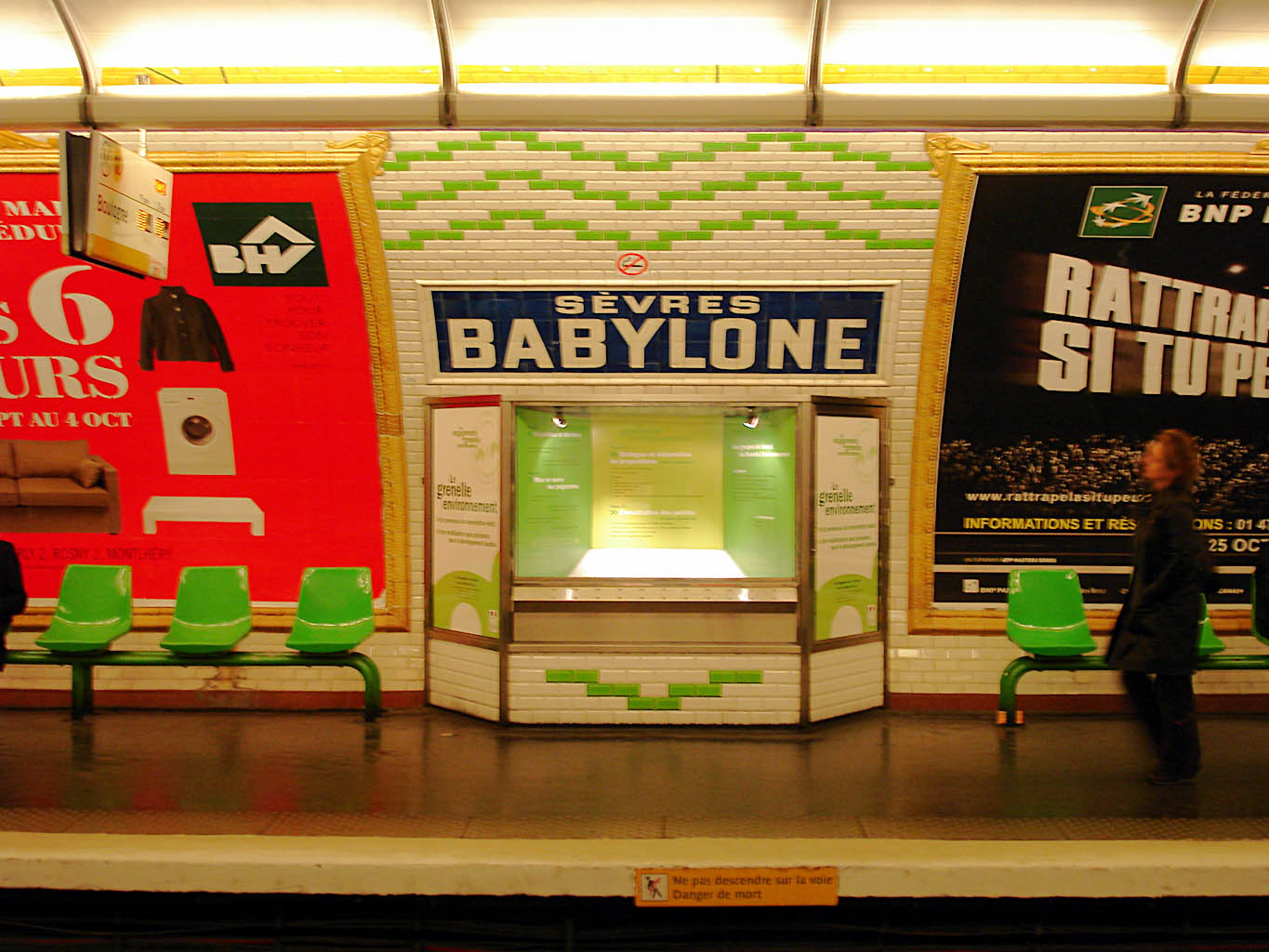
One of the environmentally-related showcases in the station Sèvres–Babylone

Some stations on the line are decorated with a particular cultural theme in mind:

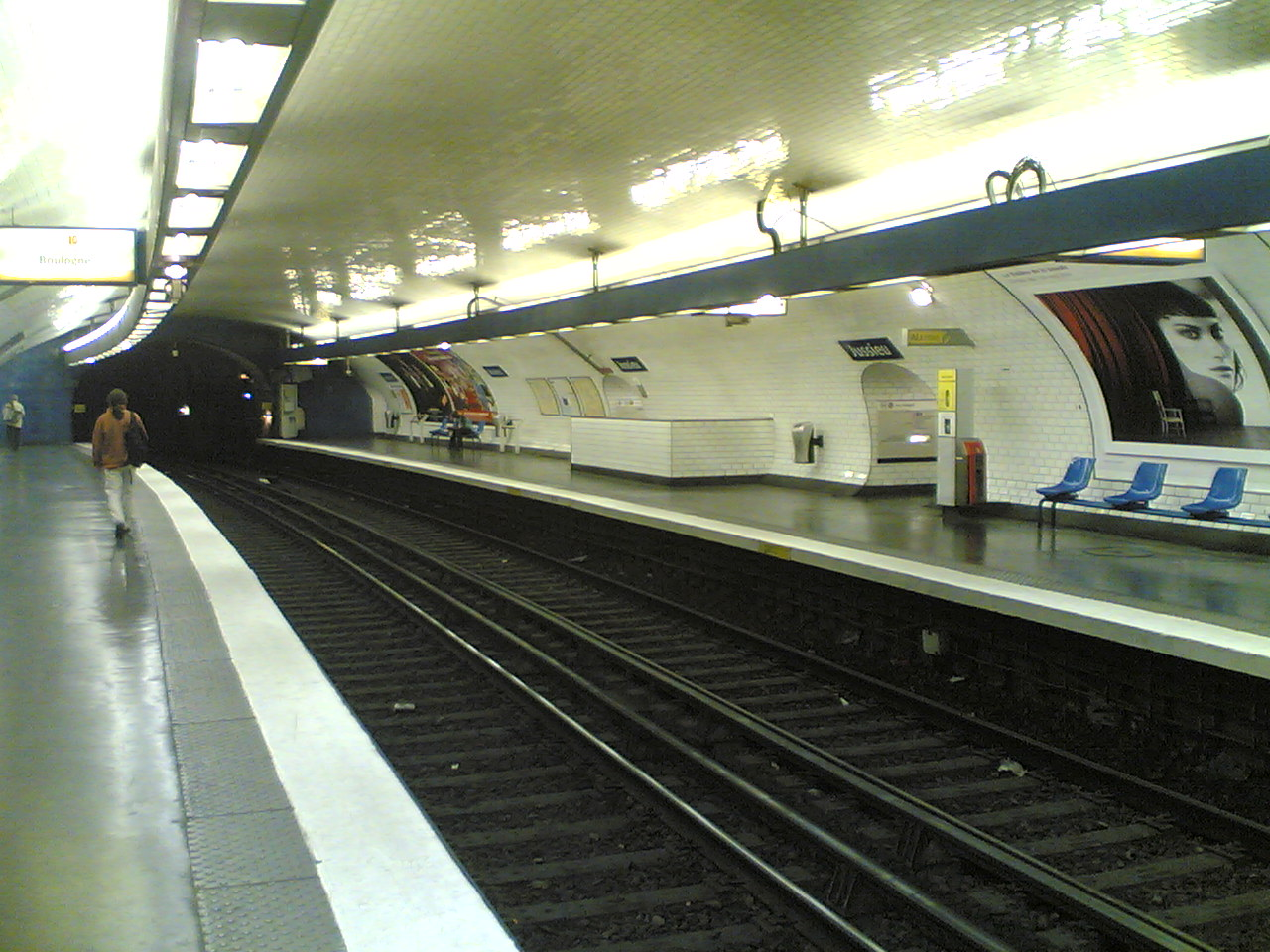
Platform of the station Jussieu

- The station Javel – André Citroën presents the life and enterprise of André Citroën with the use of placards and photographs. The seats of the station use the colors of the celebrated logo composed of chevrons, inspired by gears constructed in 1905. These decorations, however, were removed during the 2000s in light the renovation project "Renouveau du Métro".
- The halls and corridors of the station La Motte-Picquet – Grenelle are decorated with various coats of arms of the Toussaint-Guillaume Picquet de la Motte family (blue with three golden chevrons, accompanied by three silver arrowheads). A fresco represents the barrière de la Cunette, one of the doors of the Wall of the Farmers-General once situated where the station is now.
- The station Sèvres – Babylone contains an exposition of ecology, with showcases on recycling, renewable energy or water consumption and electricity consumption in the world. In 2008, these windows were renovated with signs giving specific information on the initiatives of Grenelle Environnement.
- The ceiling of the station Cluny – La Sorbonne is decorated with mosaics and signatures of famous writers such as Racine, Molière, Michelet, Victor Hugo, and Rimbaud among others, all of which were once students at the nearby eponymous university.

=== Junctions ===
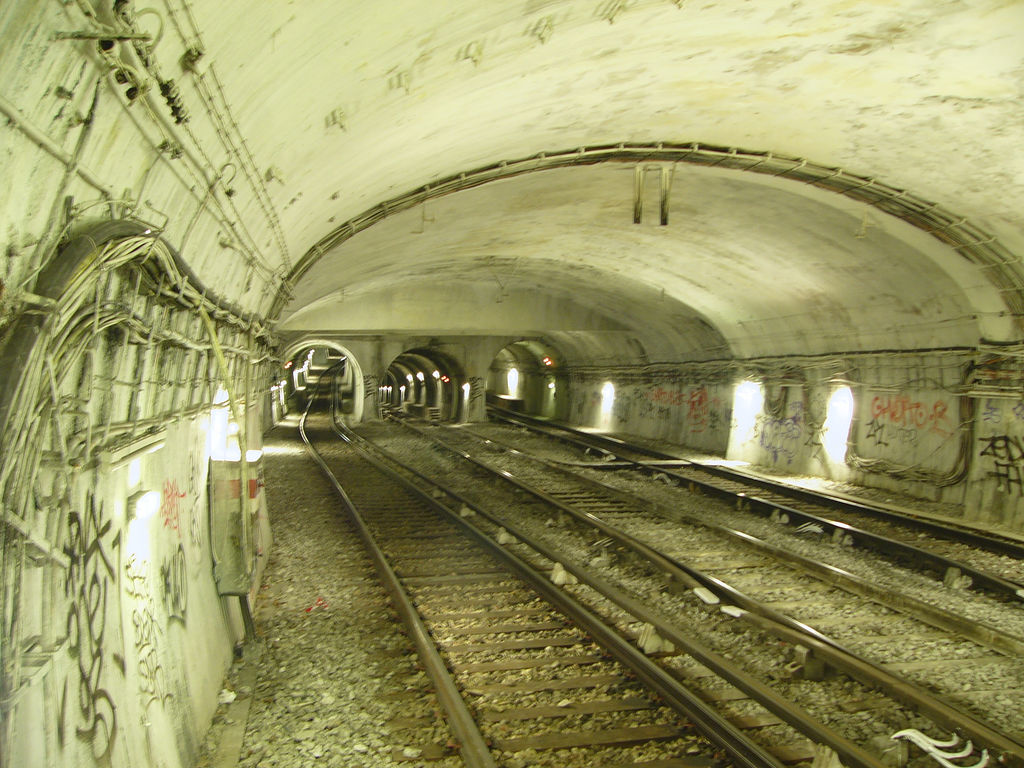
In the middle, intersection tracks towards line 4 to the west of the station Cluny – La Sorbonne

The line contains six transfer junctions with other lines of the network:

- with line 9 via Voie Murat and the depots located to the southwest of the station Porte d'Auteuil on the tracks of the old entrance that are no longer used in commercial service;
- with line 9 at the entrance to the station Michel-Ange – Auteuil towards Boulogne : This transfer track links line 9 heading to Pont de Sèvres to the closed-off northern platform of Line 10's Michel-Ange – Auteuil.
- with line 8 at the entrance to the station La Motte-Picquet – Grenelle, on the tracks heading towards Boulogne;
- a tunnel without an intersection exists towards line 13, between the stations of Duroc and Vaneau; it dates back to the old route of line 10 towards Invalides;
- with line 4 via a dead end in the east of the station Odéon, but intersecting in actuality at the east of the station Cluny – La Sorbonne after having traveled to the center of the station without bordering a platform; the intersection occurs between the two tracks of line 10 at the station Cluny – La Sorbonne where three tracks form but are then combined into the two of line 10;
- with line 7 at the exit of Maubert – Mutualité towards Gare d'Austerlitz; this two-track connection, used commercially between 1930 and 1931 when line 10 was headed to Porte de Choisy, is separated from line 10 by a strong slope between the two rails.

=== Depots ===
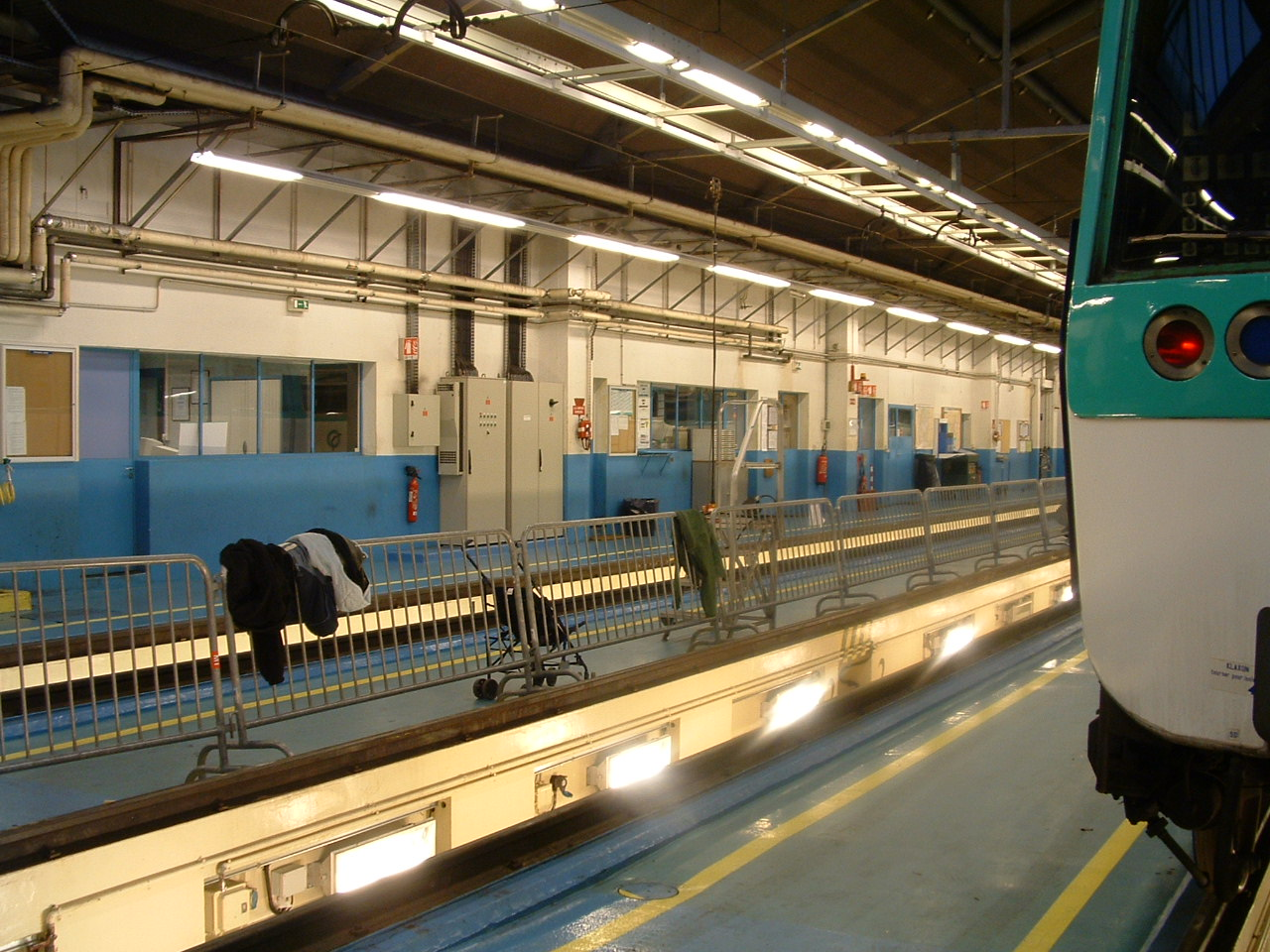
View of the service depot at Choisy

Trains on line 10 are stored at the Auteuil Workshops, which are connected to the tracks of the former terminus Porte d'Auteuil and completely underground. Other than tunnels, an escalator located on the sidewalk of the avenue du Géneral-Sarrail provides pedestrian access. The depots are connected to line 9 as well; however, line 9 has not used these depots since the opening of those at Boulogne connected to Pont de Sèvres.

Heavy (batteries, tune-ups, and repainting) maintenance of the trains of line 10, as with all other trains on the rail network, takes place at the depot at Choisy. Opened in 1931, it is situated in the 13th arrondissement of Paris, close to the Boulevard Périphérique and accessible via a junction on line 7 at Porte d'Ivry station. It is composed of two distinct sections: a maintenance workshop for the trains of line 7 (AMT), and a workshop for changing the composition of the trains on the network. The depot occupies a total of 34,350 square metres (369,700 sq ft) and employed 330 agents in 2007.

== Usage ==
=== Service ===
In 2008, one complete trip across the line took twenty-eight minutes in the west–east direction and twenty-nine minutes in the opposite direction. As with all lines of the Paris métro (except the bis lines), the first departure of the day leaves the station at 5:30 am. A train leaves from Boulogne – Pont de Saint-Cloud at 5:35 am, preceded by the first departure on the line from Porte d'Auteuil at 5:30 am, which is also the only train to take passengers on the turn-around loop at Auteuil.

The last train leaves Boulogne – Pont de Saint Cloud at 12:47 am. From Gare d'Austerlitz, the last train starting for the full trip leaves at 12:35 am for Boulogne – Pont de Saint-Cloud, with another departure for Porte d'Auteuil at 12:51 am. From Friday night to Sunday and during holidays, the last departure from Boulogne – Pont de Saint-Cloud leaves at 1:47 am for Gare d'Austerlitz. From this terminus, the last departure takes place at 1:35 am for Boulogne – Pont de Saint-Cloud and at 1:46 am for Porte d'Auteuil.

Trains on line 10 are less frequent than those on other lines: the average time between trains is between three and five minutes during the day and between eight and nine minutes late night. On Sunday mornings, the time between trains is between six and seven minutes, and about ten minutes Friday night, and all of Saturday, Sunday, and holidays after 12:30 am (after 1:15 am on Friday and Saturday nights).

=== Train sets ===
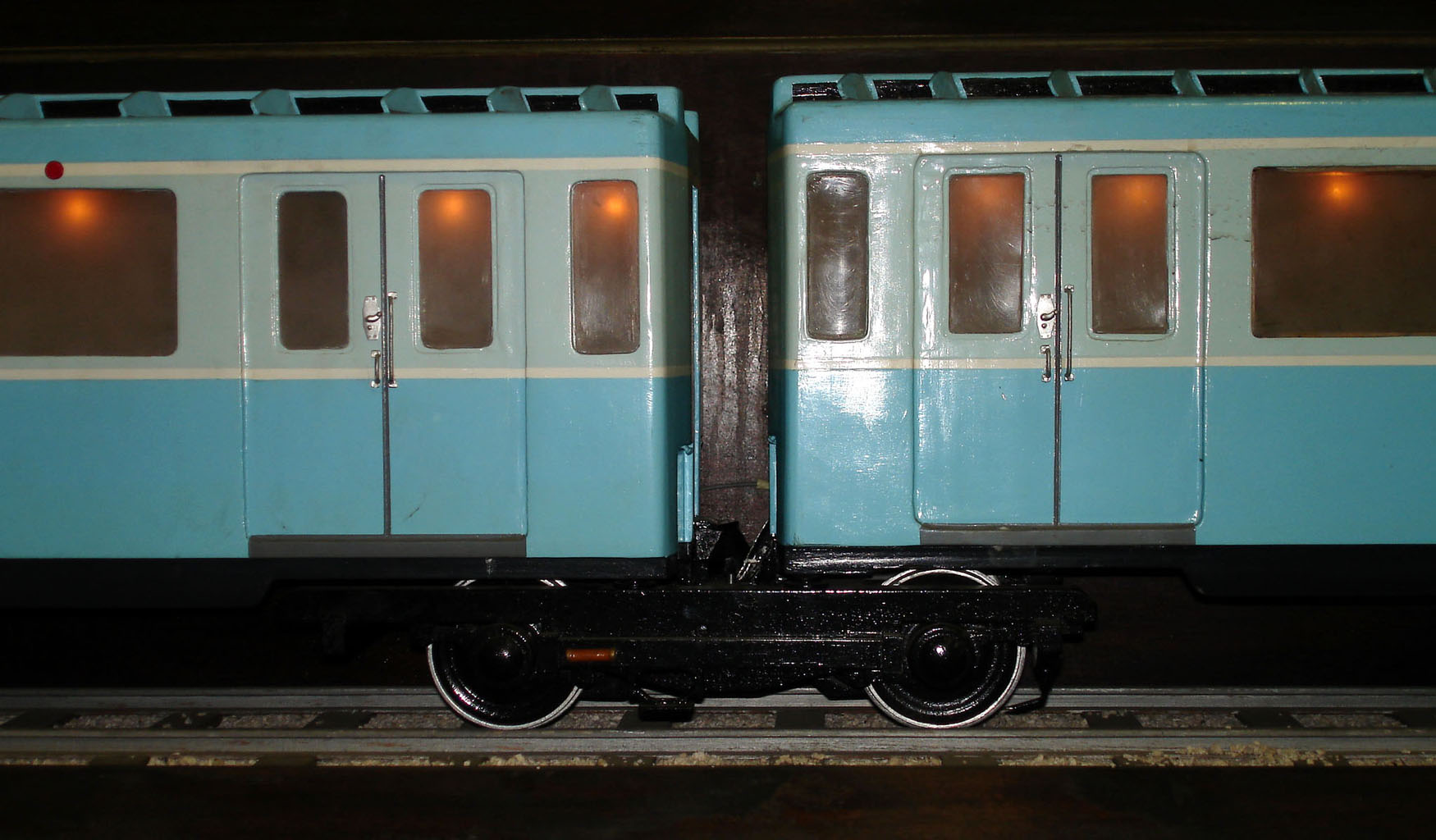
Model of an MA 51 trainset in the musée des transports urbains, interurbains, et ruraux (Museum of Urban, Suburban, and Rural Transportation)

Line 10 has always been unique in regards to its train sets. Before World War II, it was circulated by Sprague-Thomson model trainsets of only two cars, as passenger traffic was very light. Until 1976, old Spragues circulated the line with four cars each (two motor cars with four motors), and since April 1975 it operated "second hand" trains that first entered service on other lines of the Metro. Line 10 began operating brand new MF 19 trains, which debuted on the line in October 2025.

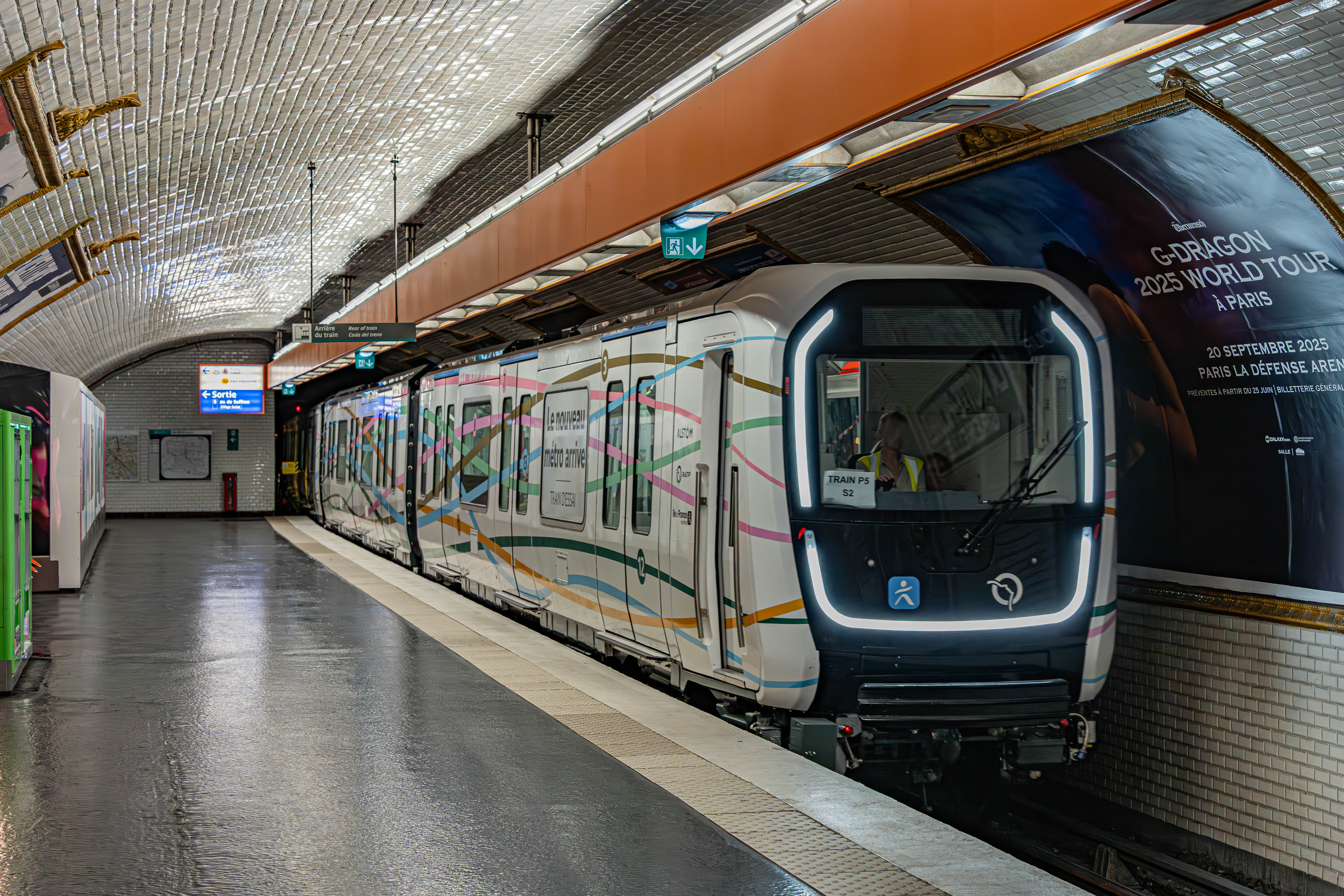
MF 19 on tests at La Motte-Picquet–Grenelle

Line 13 transformed in the middle of the 1970s as a result of its junction with the former line 14, and as such welcomed a more modern and better performing train set, the MF 67, that was put in service there to replace the MA 51. Beginning 28 April 1975, the old MA 51 train sets of line 13 were progressively transferred to line 10 and drastically modernized. The cars were repainted, their outer bodies and seats replaced, and modern fluorescent lighting installed. They circulated in permanent sets of six. By June 1976, all of the trains had been transferred to line 10 and put into service, where they eventually ended their career. In order to reform the old Sprague models and because of an insufficient number of trainsets, some MF 67 train sets of the A/D model were placed on line 10 as well. The MA 51 model was retired from 1988 and to, and afterwards were replaced by MF 67 series E models coming from line 7bis, which itself got the MF 88 trains in return. The MF 67 trains, still in service in 2025, are being be progressively replaced by the brand new MF 19, the first of which entered service on 16 October 2025.

=== Fares and financing ===
Fares on line 10 are identical to those on the rest of the transport network and are accessible via the same tickets. A ticket t+ allows for a single one-way trip with one or more connections with other lines of the metro as well as inner-city RER lines. On the other hand, zoned subscriptions allow unlimited trips within the constraints of the zoning selected, and without special faring lines such as Orlyval.

The financing of the functioning of the line, maintenance, cars, and employees is handled by the RATP; however, fares are dictated legislatively and income from ticket sales do not completely cover the network's entire costs. This difference is made up by funding from the Syndicat des transports d'Île-de-France (STIF) (Île-de-France Transportation Union), which has been presided over since 2005 by the president of the Conseil régional d'Île-de-France, composed of locally elected persons. This group defines the general conditions of use as well as the duration and frequency of services. Financing is assured by a 3.5 billion euro subsidy made possible through transportation deposits paid by corporations and contributions from public community groups.

=== Traffic ===
Line 10 is a secondary line on the Parisian network, and the number of total passengers amounts to only a little more than a quarter of the total passengers of line 1. Line 10 is the least-traveled main line on the network, 3bis & 7bis lines set aside. Between 1992 and 2004, traffic has grown a total of 4.7%, which puts the line in 8th place in terms of growth (behind line 14). From 1992 to 2004, traffic increased by 4.7%, which places the line in eighth position in terms of growth on the network (excluding line 14).

Year	1992	1993	1994	1995	1996	1997	1998	1999	2000	2001	2002	2003	2004
Number of passengers (in millions)	39.6	39.4	39.0	33.5	35.4	37.9	38.8	39.7	41.3	40.0	40.5	39.6	41.5

Year	2007	2008	2009	2010	2011	2012	2013	2014	2015	2016	2017	2018	2019	2020	2021	2022	2023	2024
Number of passengers (in millions)	40.4	42.4	43.4	43.3	44.3	44.9	45.2	45.8	45.2	44.9	45.3	46.41	44.73	21.1 (Note: Effect of the COVID-19 pandemic.)	29.19	38.65	42.0	43.6

In 2004, the busiest station on the line was (in annual traffic, all lines combined) Gare d'Austerlitz (10.44 millions incoming passengers in 2018) followed by La Motte-Picquet-Grenelle (7.96 millions incoming passengers in 2018) and Odéon (5.9 millions incoming passengers in 2018).

In 1998, daily traffic reached 148,613 passengers on average each working day, 104,041 on Saturdays and 53,051 on Sundays In 2003, annual traffic reached 39,506,402 passengers, with daily traffic averaging 146,777 passengers on each working day, 102,025 on Saturdays and 58,664 on Sundays. In 2023, annual traffic reached 38.7 million passengers.

== Tourism ==
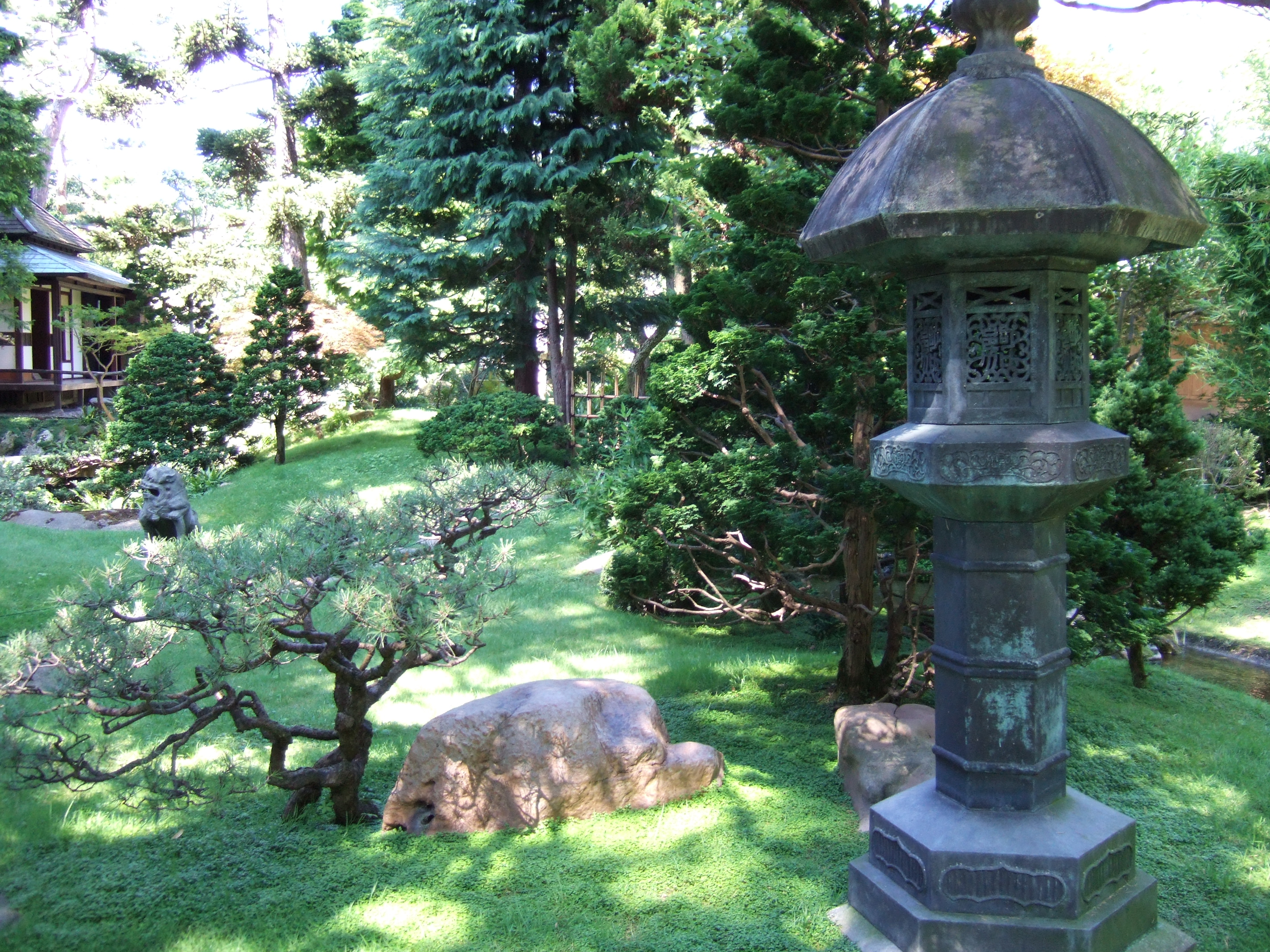
The Japanese Garden of the musée départemental Albert-Kahn in Boulogne-Billancourt

Because the route of line 10 is limited to the south of the capital and passes few centres of activities, is it rarely travelled by Parisians. With the exception of the eastern Gare d'Austerlitz – Duroc section, traffic is very light. On the other hand, the line is especially used by students, as it links multiple important university centers such as the campus de Jussieu, la Sorbonne, and Sciences Po, for example. The line services several places of interest to tourists in Paris and its western suburb:

- The Parc de Saint-Cloud and the Albert-Kahn museum and garden at Boulogne-Billancourt (Boulogne – Pont de Saint-Cloud);
- The Jardin des Serres d'Auteuil, Auteuil Hippodrome, Jean-Bouin, Roland-Garros and the Parc des Princes stadiums (Porte d'Auteuil);
- The Bon Marché department store and the Chapel of Our Lady of the Miraculous Medal, where the Virgin Mary is said to have appeared and revealed the Miraculous Medal (Sèvres – Babylone)
- Saint-Germain-des-Prés (Mabillon and Odéon);
- the Odéon district, including its Théâtre de l'Europe and the Palais du Luxembourg (Odéon);
- The Thermes & Musée de Cluny (Musée national du Moyen Âge), as well as the Latin Quarter (Cluny – La Sorbonne, Maubert – Mutualité and Cardinal Lemoine);
- The Collège de France and Lycée Louis le Grand elite colleges (Cluny – La Sorbonne)
- The Pantheon (Cluny – La Sorbonne or Cardinal Lemoine)
- The famous rue Mouffetard and Place de la Contrescarpe (Cardinal Lemoine)
- The university of Jussieu, Institut du Monde Arabe, Arènes de Lutèce and Grande Mosquée de Paris (Jussieu)
- Gare d'Austerlitz, the Jardin des Plantes and the National Museum of Natural History (Gare d'Austerlitz).

== History ==
=== Chronology ===
- 13 July 1913: Opening of the Beaugrenelle (now Charles Michels) – Duroc section as part of the original line 8.
- 30 September 1913: Extension of line 8 west to Porte d'Auteuil, completing the original plan coined by Fulgence Bienvenüe for a shuttle from Porte d'Auteuil to Opéra.
- 30 December 1923: The first section of line 10 was opened between Invalides and Croix Rouge (today, half of this section is served by line 13 ).
- 10 March 1925: The line was extended eastbound from Croix Rouge to Mabillon.
- 14 February 1926: The line was extended from Mabillon to Odéon.
- 15 February 1930: The line was extended from Odéon to Place d'Italie.
- 7 March 1930: The line was extended from Place d'Italie to Porte de Choisy.
- 26 April 1931: The section from Place Monge to Porte de Choisy was transferred to line 7 (as a result of the opening of Line 7's tunnel under the Seine). line 10 was also extended from Maubert-Mutualité to Jussieu.
- 27 July 1937: The section from Duroc to Invalides was transferred to the former line 14 (not to confuse with today's line 14).
- 29 July 1937: Line 10 was extended westbound from Duroc to La Motte-Picquet. The section between La Motte-Picquet and Porte d'Auteuil was transferred from line 8 to line 10.
- 12 July 1939: The line was extended eastbound from Jussieu to Gare d'Orléans-Austerlitz.
- 2 September 1939: As with many other stations, service to Croix-Rouge and Cluny – La Sorbonne stations ceased at the start of World War II. Both stations are eventually closed permanently.
- 3 October 1980: Line 10 was extended westbound from Porte d'Auteuil to Boulogne-Jean Jaurès.
- 2 October 1981: The line was extended from Boulogne-Jean Jaurès to Boulogne–Pont de Saint-Cloud station, the line's actual westbound terminus.
- 17 February 1988: With to the opening of Saint-Michel – Notre Dame station on the RER line B, Cluny-la Sorbonne station was re-opened to allow fast connection between the lines.
- March 2025: Arrival of the very first MF 19 train on Line 10, for test run.
- 16 October 2025: The MF 19 train enters public service on Line 10, the very first line to receive the new-generation train. Cascading from MF 67 to MF 19 is expected through 2026 until mid-2027.

=== Service to Auteuil ===
Métro line 10 resulted from the connection of two sections, east and west, which created a set of distinct lines. The west section, from La Motte-Picquet to Grenelle à Porte d'Auteuil was initially part of line 8.

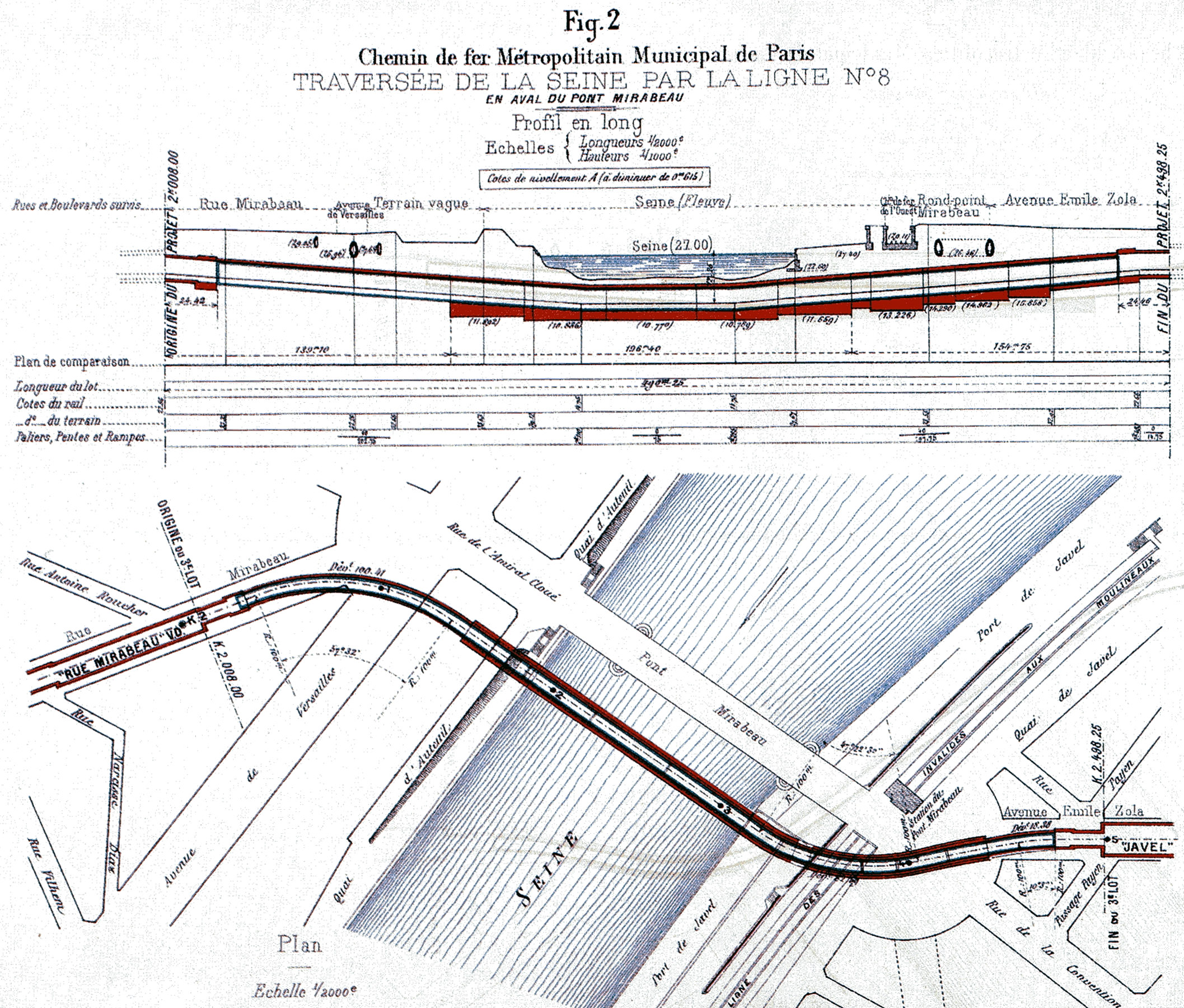
Blueprint of the underwater tunnel to Pont Mirabeau

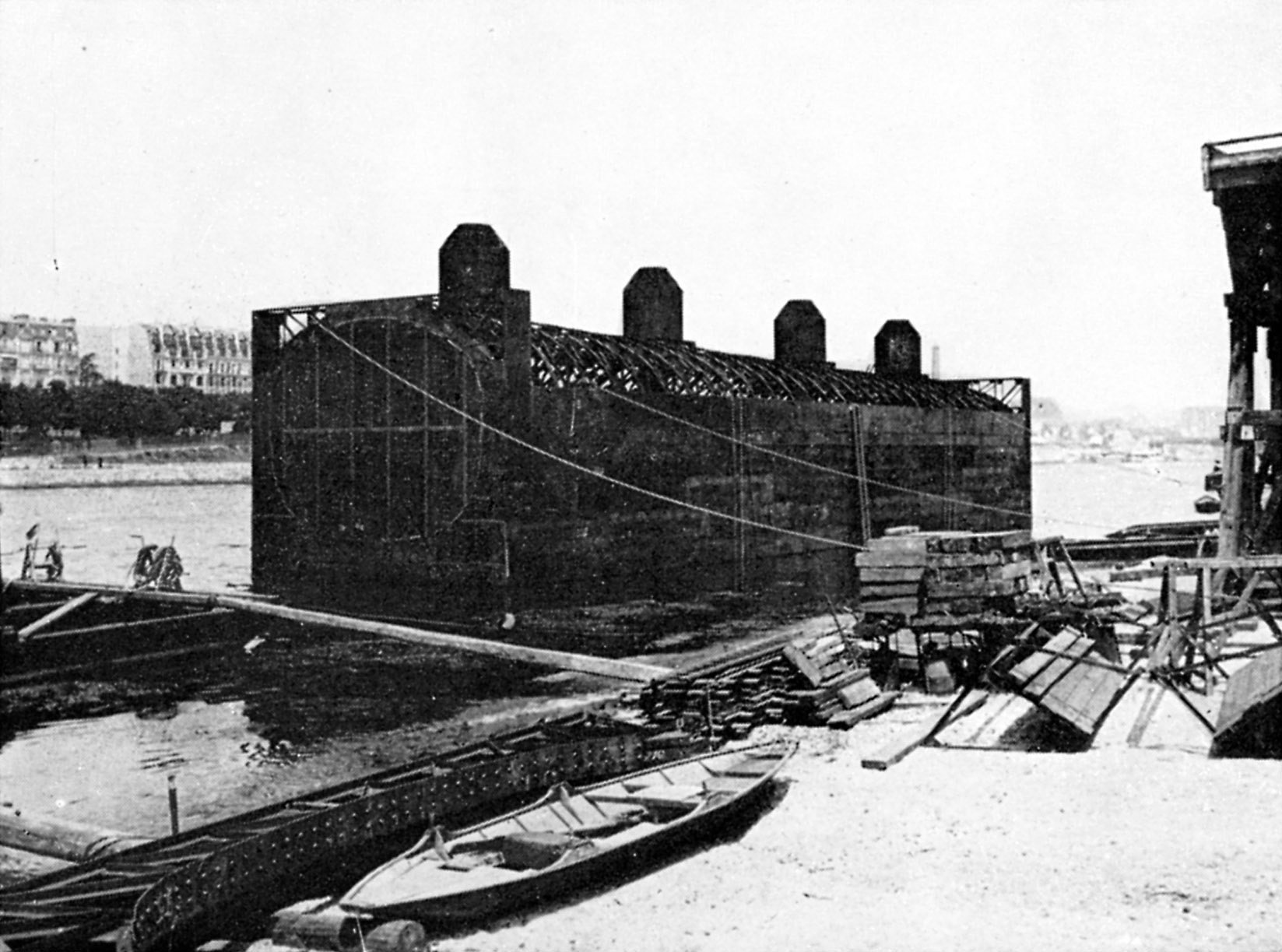
Steel beams in the Seine at Pont Mirabeau, 1908

Line 8 was the last line adopted for the agreement of 30 March 1898, and consisted of a route between Opéra and Porte d'Auteuil via Grenelle. In March 1910, it was decided that the line would have a branch, a concept that had just been inaugurated with line 7. Trains would branch at Grenelle station and run to the Porte de Sèvres (now Balard). The trains would run along the two branches alternately.

Work on the line began in April 1908 with an underwater construction site in the Seine between the stations of Concorde and Invalides on one end and another construction site at Pont Mirabeau on the other. The first site was completed in January 1911, after being delayed during the 1910 Great Flood of Paris.

The tunnel under the Seine is made up of five box caissons, between 35 and 44 meters (115 and 144 ft) long, pre-assembled on the quai de Javel (now the quai André-Citroën). It has a cast iron casing placed under a masonry vault. The construction of the tunnel on the right bank (rive droite) was more delicate because of its less solid alluvium, thus three additional caissons were required which were assembled on the Rond-point du Pont Mirabeau (roundabout) on the left bank. The presence of a railway line running from Invalides to Versailles (now line C of the RER) made work particularly difficult. A final caisson was buried in an excavation made under the tracks, but the lack of height required scaffolding to be used and the casing was gradually extended as the caisson was installed. Work began in August 1907 but was not finished until 1913, also delayed by the 1910 Great Flood of Paris.

The Invalides–Javel section, which did not present any particular difficulties, was completed in 1910. Grenelle station was built according to a particular double station configuration on two levels, which allowed for the simultaneous departure of trains towards Auteuil from a single platform and the planned branch towards the Porte of Sèvres on one level, as well as the arrival of trains in the opposite direction from both branches at an island platform on another level.

While work at Pont Mirabeau was ongoing, the line was opened to the public on 13 July 1913 between Beaugrenelle and Opéra stations and was extended on 30 September 1913 to Porte d'Auteuil. In 1914, line 8 contained fifteen stations between Porte d'Auteuil and Opéra.

=== The start of line 10 ===
The principle of a circular line, conceived at the start of the 1900s, led to the creation of a line called Ceinture intérieure des Invalides aux Invalides ("inner belt from Invalides to Invalides"). This 11.7-kilometre (7.3 mi) concept was designated as line 10 in 1907.

On the right bank, the line had to use the platforms of line 8, and as such a set of complex connections were created under the esplanade of Invalides with the creation of a large loop. However, in October 1912, the principle of an inner belt was abandoned and line 10 was left to connect Invalides to Bastille via the left bank.

Work on the section between Invalides and Croix-Rouge began in 1913 and ended on 18 March 1920. However, the prospect of low revenues that would certainly result from such a small section serving only neighborhoods of little activity caused the Compagnie du chemin de fer métropolitain de Paris (CMP) to delay the construction and postpone the opening and what would surely be a resulting deficit as far back as possible. Finally, after being required by the city to do so, the company opened the line for use on 30 December 1923. The new line 10 consisted of six stations, each of which with a vaulted ceiling. The line ran under the Rue de Four, the Rue de Sèvres, and the Boulevard des Invalides with a very pronounced bend at Duroc.

The line quickly became a financial disaster for the CMP, with an average of at most 1,000 passengers per day and per station. The terminus of Croix-Rouge received only four hundred daily passengers, and Varenne station, the least frequented station of the entire métro network, saw only three hundred passengers per day. As a result, only ten trains of six cars serviced the line, two motor cars serving as first class cars, which saw so little traffic that they were replaced with simple motors equipped only with two conductor cars.

=== Extensions to the east ===
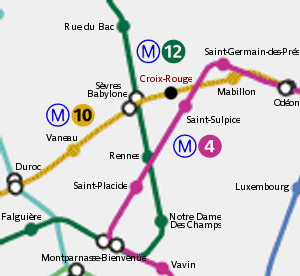
Location of the station Croix-Rouge

Extension on the line followed in 1923 between Croix-Rouge and Odéon, creating a section 900 metres (2,953 ft) long connecting two additional stations. This tiny extension brought an increase of traffic due to its connection with line 4. It began serving Mabillon on 10 March 1925 and Odéon on 14 February 1926.

The City of Paris decided in 1925 to connect three lines to line 10. To this end, many possibilities were examined. It was first envisioned to extend the line to Bastille via Place Jussieu, to complement the creation of a circular line. However, the abandonment of the circular line project made this extension of little use and it would have required an underwater section very close to one already planned for line 7 toward Pont de Sully. Eventually, the city chose to end the line at Jussieu on the left bank, which would create a connection with line 7.

Because of the difficulties the construction of an underwater section would present, and the time it would require, it was planned in 1927 to link line 10 to an extension of line 7 between Jussieu and Porte de Choisy that was already underway. With this in mind, it was decided to create a connection with two platforms between the stations of Maubert of line 10 and Place Monge of the future line 7 so that line 10 would temporarily use this section of line 7 while the underwater tunnel that connected the northern and southern sections of the line was constructed.

The tunnel between the Boulevard Saint-Michel and Porte de Choisy was delivered by the city to the CMP in November 1929. In less than three months, the platform was completed, the lighting was installed, and access was made possible. Line 10 arrived at Place d'Italie on 15 February 1930 and at Porte de Choisy on 7 March of the same year, using the platforms of the future line 7. Before its reconstruction, the line served nineteen stations.

The route of this new section runs parallel to those of above-ground transport services that were especially crowded. As a result, line 10 saw a rapid increase in use; however, its route on the left bank did not serve the needs of passengers well and therefore many used line 10 as a way to make connections to other lines, particularly line 5 at Place d'Italie and line 12 at Sèvres-Babylone to continue on to destinations on the right bank. The western section between Sèvres and Invalides remained lightly used.

=== Modification of lines during the 1930s ===
Outline of the modifications of lines 8, 10, and 14 in 1937

At the same time that the underwater crossing of line 7 was completed, line 10's tunnel from Maubert to Jussieu was also completed. The line crossed the line towards Place Monge by a flying junction. On 21 April 1931, the underwater tunnel of line 7 was completed as far as Jussieu. The completion of this station necessitated a considerable amount of work with regards to its location under the Halle-aux-Vins, upon which the Faculté des sciences de Jussieu is located. Here, the track structure is built on concrete beams supported on both sides. The platforms of lines 7 and 10 are next to each other.

On 21 April 1931, the operation of the two lines was modified. Line 7 was extended from Sully-Morland on the right bank to Porte d'Ivry and the trains of line 10 stopped using the middle section of line 7 and instead began the use of the new tracks to Jussieu. At the same time, Cardinal Lemoine station was opened. Traffic on line 10 diminished significantly but also became more evenly distributed across its sections.

The line saw its largest modification on its western section in 1937, which impacted several lines. At the time, the route of line 10 did not attract a large number of passengers; however, the development of a section between La Motte-Picquet and Balard had already been agreed upon, so the creation of line 14, Porte de Vanves – Bienvenüe (today a part of line 13), stayed in the plans. These considerations led the Conseil municipal de Paris (Municipal Council of Paris) to decide to have multiple extensions added and to carry out a partial restructuring of the lines.

Line 8 was given a new terminus at Balard and the old section of line 8 between La Motte-Picquet and Porte d'Auteuil was incorporated into line 10. Meanwhile, the section of Line 10 between Duroc and Invalides was transferred to line 14.

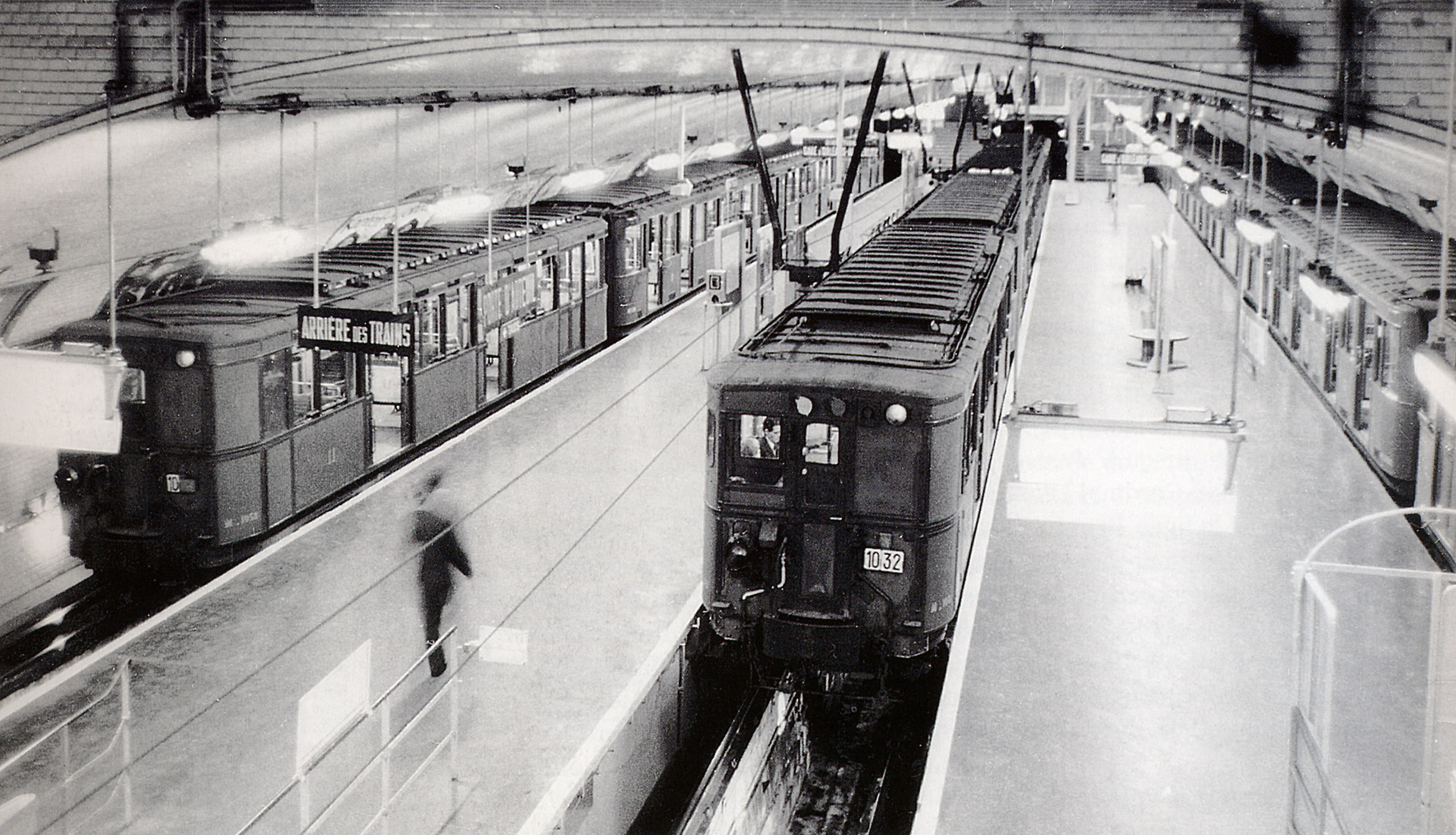
Sprague-Thomson stock with four cars at the terminus Porte d’Auteuil

Work began at the end of 1934. A new section was constructed from La Motte-Picquet to Duroc in the east with a new intermediate station, Ségur. The reconfiguration of the three lines' routes was planned so to minimize interruption while construction took place. The lines were shut down during a single night, between 26 and 27 July 1937. During this night, one team removed the rails on line 10 on the bend by Duroc, while another modified the rails by La Motte-Picquet. Other teams changed the advisory signs of all involved stations, as well as the line maps in the stations and on the trains. On the morning of 27 July, line 10 was cut in two: from Jussieu to Duroc on one part, and from La Motte-Picquet to Porte d'Auteuil on the other. On 29 July, service began from Porte d'Auteuil to Jussieu.

Line 10 was now gradually approaching its current configuration. The objective was to link Porte d'Auteuil to Gare d'Austerlitz to form a more coherent east–west route. The extension from Jussieu to Gare d'Austerlitz is 1,027 metres long. Construction began in 1934; however, it ran into a number of difficulties resulting from its proximity to the Seine and the railway tracks of the Austerlitz-Gare d'Orsay line (now part or RER line C), which part of the line had to tunnel under. Construction of the infrastructure was completed on 14 September 1938, and the extension was opened to the public on 12 July 1939.

In September 1939, World War II broke out and the stations of Croix-Rouge and Cluny-La Sorbonne, considered too close to Sèvres – Babylone and Maubert respectfully, were closed. After these closures, the line encompassed 20 stations altogether. On 3 June 1940, the bombing of Citroën factories damaged the tunnel of line 10 between Chardon-Lagache and Mirabeau. As a result, service was restricted to Beaugrenelle (now Charles-Michels). Three days later, a shuttle was put into service between Beaugrenelle and Porte d'Auteuil, running on one track. Normal service was re-established on 8 June.

=== Westward expansion ===
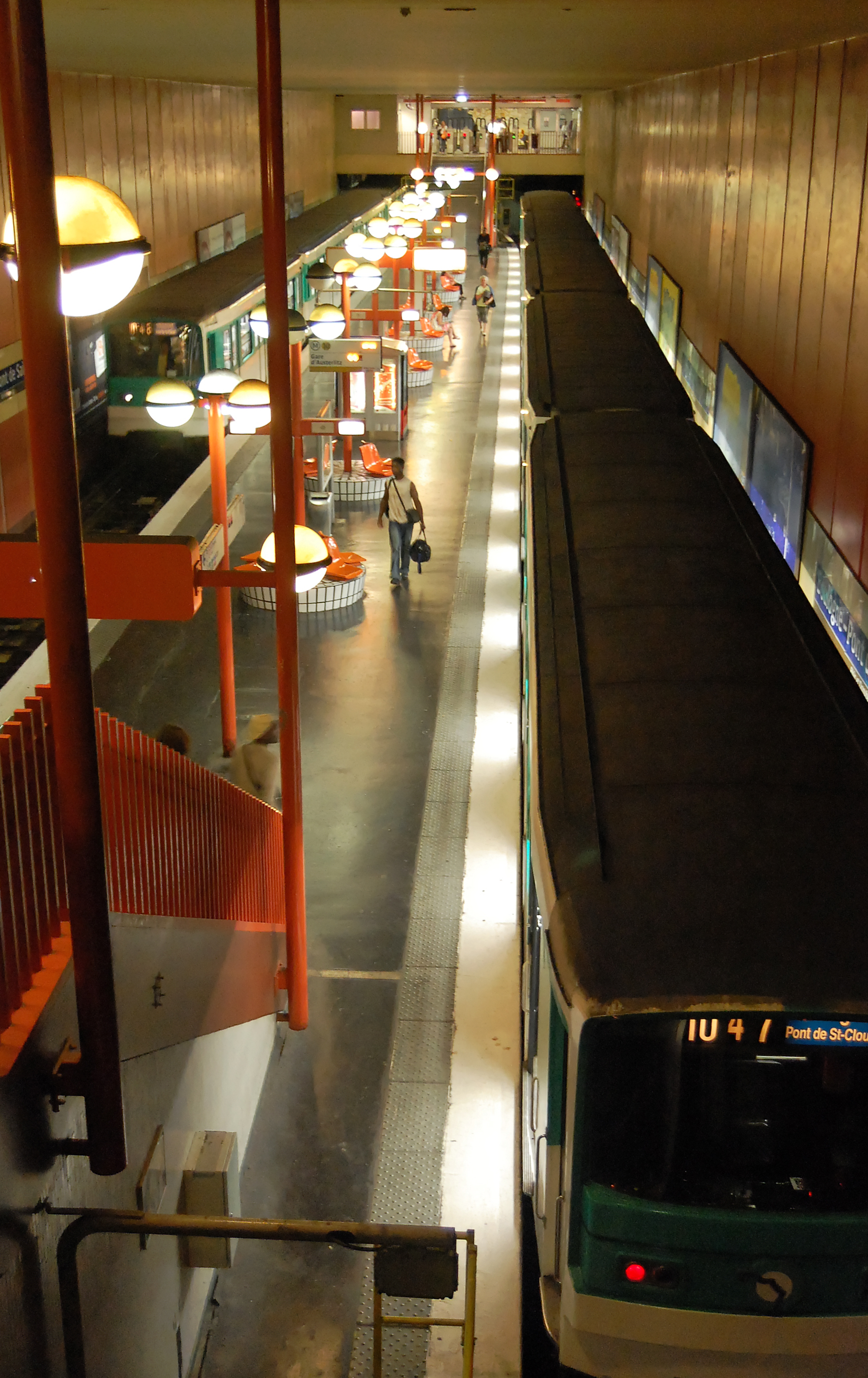
The central platform of Boulogne–Pont de Saint-Cloud station

There was a period of forty years between expansion projects. Finally, in 1977 a new expansion project began with the objective of improving the service to the municipality of Boulogne-Billancourt. Although, the south of the municipality was already served by line 9, this expansion was justified as the municipality was the most populated of the Île-de-France apart from Paris and its area is relatively large.

The expansion work, with consisted of 2.3 kilometers (1.4 mi) of track and two new stations, began in February 1977 and took place mostly in open cuts. The two stations contain island platforms due to the narrowness of the rail network, spanning only twelve metres. This constraint required a specific type of construction to assure the structural stability of the adjacent buildings during the settling of the ground. The stable layer of chalk under the ground allowed for the creation of grooves to support a temporary roof structure. Excavation began in a trench covered by the temporary roof slab. The double-track tunnel connects to the Auteuil loop via two single-track tunnels. For the first time on the Parisian network, the terminus did not contain a turn-back system behind the station due to lack of space, so the turn-back system is built in front of the station. The opening of this section, which is entirely underground, took place in two phases: the first expansion to Boulogne-Jean Jaurès was inaugurated on 3 October 1980, and the second section to Boulogne-Pont de Saint-Cloud was opened on 2 October 1981. Boulougne at first was served by only every other train, with the second train returning eastward via the loop at Auteuil. After 6:40 pm, all trains served the entire line.

Following the opening of the Saint-Michel–Notre-Dame station on line B of the RER in February 1988, the station Cluny-La Sorbonne, closed in 1939, was reopened to provide a fast connection with lines B and C of the RER.

The line was modernised in 1974 with the establishment of the Poste de commande centralisé ("centralised control station"). In 1975, the Sprague-Thomson sets were replaced by the MA 51 articulated sets transferred there from line 13 when it absorbed former line 14. These trains eventually were replaced by the MF 67 sets on 15 June 1994, still running today. Line 10 is the only main line of the Paris Métro (except the short 3bis and 7bis lines), that is not equipped with Automatic Train Operation as the trains circulating at that time were not compatible with the technology. When the trains are eventually replaced with a compatible model, it is believed that the line's relatively low traffic didn't justify installing it.

== Expansion projects ==
No expansion project has been officially scheduled for line 10 through the year 2030 in the schéma directeur de la région île-de-France (SDRIF). Nevertheless, many projects have been proposed over the years.

=== Westward ===
One proposal consists of expanding line 10 from Boulogne – Pont de Saint-Cloud to the train station gare de Saint-Cloud, via an intermediate station at Parc de Saint-Cloud. Such an expansion would total about 1 kilometre (0.62 mi) in total. Line 10 would then have a connection with the tramway T2 at Parc de Saint-Cloud, with the Transilien network of Paris-St-Lazare at the train station gare de Saint-Cloud, as well as the upcoming line 15. This plan would however require creating a new Pont de Saint Cloud station below the actual once, since the tracks are too close to the Seine river for direct expansion.

This westward expansion was not included in the SDRIF that was adopted in 2008.

=== Eastward ===
A recurring request of passengers has been to extend line 10 eastward, traversing the Seine between gare d'Austerlitz and gare de Lyon to provide service to the latter as these two neighboring train stations are not linked to each other by any rail line. The current configuration of the line and the substrate in the area of the proposed line would make such an extension difficult and therefore improbable.

The extension most likely to be realized is along the RER C route (most likely under the rue du Chevaleret towards the 13th arrondissement, a neighborhood still poorly serviced despite the opening of line 14 to the station Olympiades and in consideration of the construction of a university in the Paris Rive Gauche neighborhood). In 2007, the Conseil de Paris deliberated on the importance of expanding line 10 to Ivry-sur-Seine. The SDRIF adopted in 2008 does not include this proposal. However, it does state that "optimization studies of service to Seine-Amont suggest that changes and/or expansions to lines 7, 10, and 14 may be necessary".

In October 2008, one of the sociétés d'économie mixte de Paris (SEMAPA) requested a feasibility study to be conducted on an expansion to place Gambetta in Ivry-sur-Seine. An independent study was done by the syndicat des transports d'île-de-France (STIF), in which the stations Chevaleret, Bibliothèque François Mitterrand, Bruneseau, Ivry – Nelson-Mandela, and Ivry-Place Gambetta were included.

== See also ==
- Paris
- Transport in Paris
- List of Paris Métro stations
- List of RER stations
- List of metro systems
- Rail transport in France

== Sources ==
- Le patrimoine de la RATP (in French). Flohic. 1996. ISBN 2-84234-007-8.
- Gasnault, François; Zuber, Henri (1997). Métro-Cité : le chemin de fer métropolitain à la conquête de Paris, 1871–1945 (in French). Paris: les musées de la ville de Paris. ISBN 2-87900-374-1.
- Guerrand, Roger-Henri (1999). L'aventure du métropolitain (in French). Paris: La découverte.
- Jacobs, Gaston (2001). Le métro de Paris : un sièce de matériel roulant (in French). la Vie du Rail. ISBN 2-902808-97-6.
- Lamming, Clive. Métro insolite (in French).
- Robert, Jean (1983). Notre Métro (in French). Paris: Self-published.
- Tricoire, Jean (1999a). Le métro de Paris – 1899 – 1911 : images de la construction (in French). Paris: Paris Musées. ISBN 2-87900-481-0.
- Tricoire, Jean (1999b). Un siècle de métro en 14 lignes. De Bienvenüe à Météor (in French). La Vie du Rail. ISBN 2-902808-87-9.
