= MF 77 =

Paris Metro train

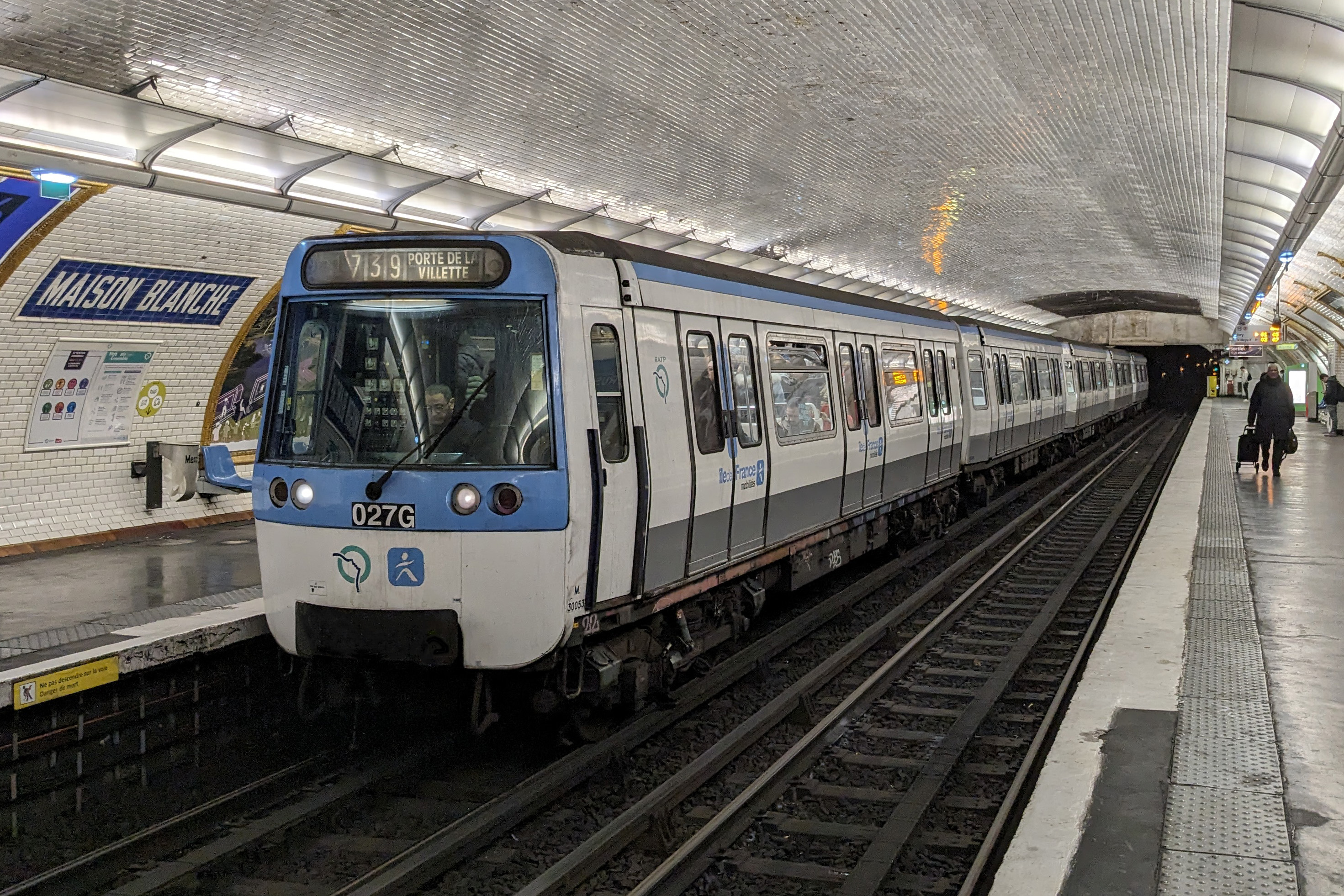
- A refurbished MF 77 at Maison Blanche on Line 7, en route to Porte de la Villette

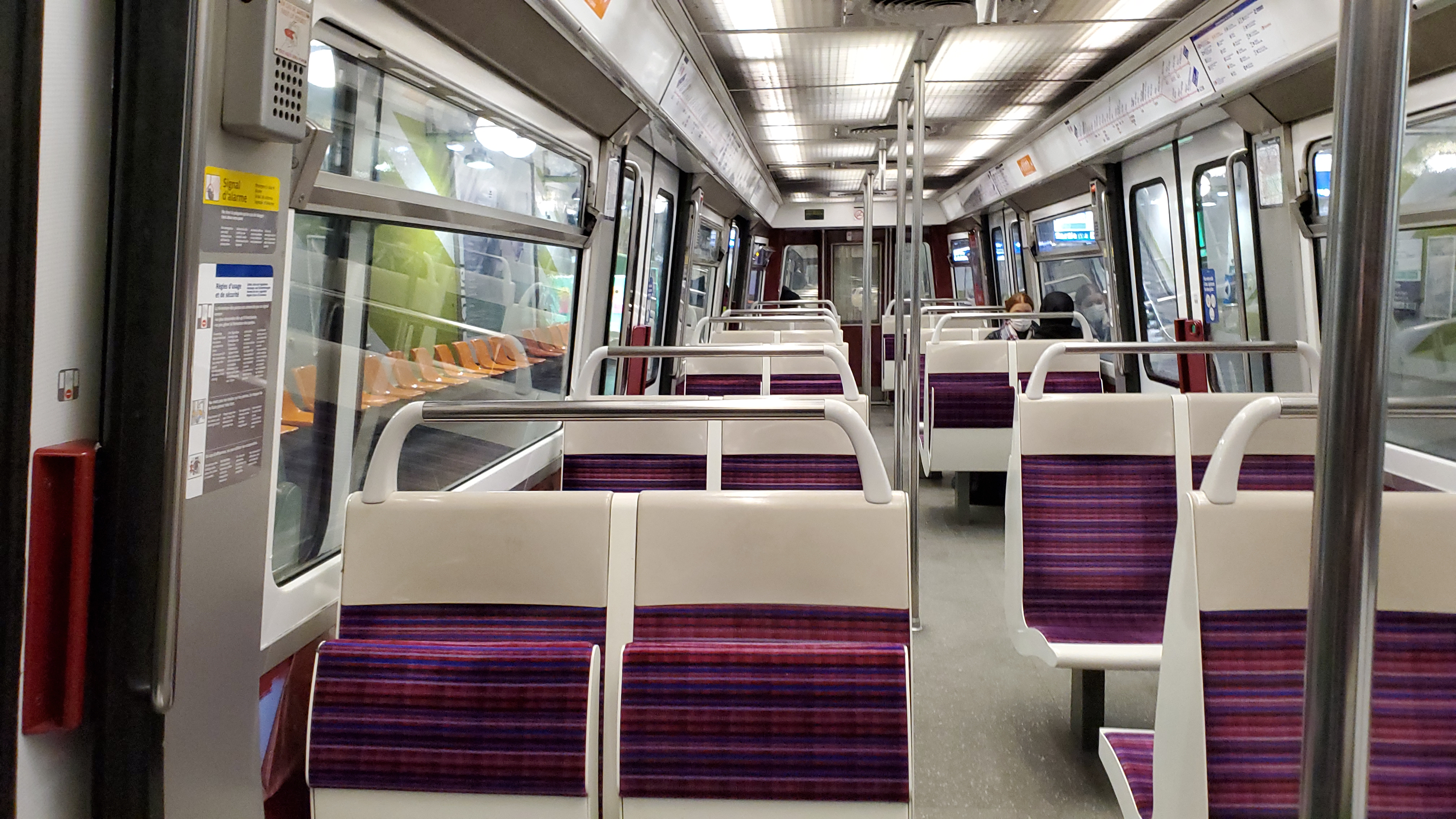
- Interior of a refurbished MF 77
- In service: 26 September 1978–present
- Manufacturers: Alsthom, CEM-Oerlikon, Creusot-Loire, ANF-Industry, Jeumont-Schneider
- Replaced: Sprague-Thomson
- Constructed: 1976–1986
- Refurbished: 2007-2011 (Line 13); 2018-2023 (Line 7); 2023-2026 (Line 8)
- Number built: 985 cars (197 trainsets)
- Successor: MF 19
- Formation: 5 cars per trainset
- Capacity: 574 per trainset
- Operator: RATP
- Line served: Paris Metro Paris Metro Line 7 Paris Metro Line 8 Paris Metro Line 13

Specifications
- Car body construction: Aluminium alloy
- Train length: 77.5 m (254 ft 3 in)
- Car length: Motor car: 15.48 m (50 ft 9 in)
- Width: 2.46 m (8 ft 1 in)
- Height: 3.46 m (11 ft 4 in)
- Doors: 3 pairs per side, per car
- Maximum speed: Design: 100 km/h (62 mph); Service: 70 km/h (43 mph)
- Weight: Trainset: 131 t (289,000 lb); Motor car: 29.5 t (65,000 lb); Trailer car: 21.5 t (47,000 lb)
- Traction system: Jeumont-Schneider thyristor chopper; Cars 1–187: analog control; Cars 188–197: microprocessor control
- Traction motors: MF5/TAO 679/4ELH 3054
- Power output: 1,590 kW (2,130 hp)
- Transmission: Cardan shaft and axle mounted gear wheel, 1:4.445 ratio
- Acceleration: 3.2 km/(h⋅s) (2.0 mph/s)
- Deceleration: 3.6 km/(h⋅s) (2.2 mph/s)
- Electric systems: Third rail, 750 V DC
- Current collection: Contact shoe
- Bogies: MTE Cast steel, H shape
- Braking systems: Dynamic, disc
- Track gauge: 1,435 mm (4 ft 8 1/2 in) standard gauge

The MF 77 (French: Métro Fer appel d'offres de 1977; English: Steel-wheeled metro ordered in 1977) is a steel-wheeled subway train used on the Paris Metro. First used in 1978, it now runs on Lines 7, 8, and 13.

Unlike previous models, the MF 77 was designed for travel into the suburbs of Paris, and as a result has a maximum speed of 100 km/h (62 mph) which - apart for suburban sections in le Kremlin-Bicêtre, Clichy and Saint Denis - wasn't fully utilized. In addition, it sports a new, curved silhouette with a wider midsection. Its original exterior colors, white and blue, led passengers to refer to it as le métro blanc, or white metro, as opposed to the mainly blue trains of the other rolling stock liveries.

Brand new MF 19 trains are set to replace the MF 77 between 2027-2036: first on Line 13 in 2027, then on Line 8 in 2030, and lastly on Line 7 in 2033. Once the MF 77 is retired, the entire Parisian subway network will be composed of trains with open gangways, automated announcements and asynchronous motors.

== History ==
=== Replacing the Sprague ===
In the early 1970s, upon the completion of the MF 67 delivery – at the time the newest steel-wheeled trains on the Paris Metro – many technological advances in braking and traction caused the RATP to examine the possibilities for new steel-wheeled trains to replace the aging Sprague-Thomson fleet. The RATP thus commissioned a consortium of companies including Alstom, CEM, Creusot-Loire, and Jeumont Schneider, to design a new addition to the Metro's rolling stock, the MF 77.

The RATP's goal at the time of commission was for 1,000 cars, 600 of which to contain engines for 200 five-car sets : Order then reduced to 187 sets for a total for 935 cars. The first trains were delivered in the summer of 1978 and entered passenger service on 26 September that year on Line 13, whose MF 67 trains were transferred to Line 8. A second order of ten sets was contracted on 4 February 1983, released in 1985 and 1986.

=== Mid-life refurbishment ===
The trains on Line 13 recently underwent their mid-life refurbishment, which included a new interior configuration, updated destination signage, lighting and mechanical improvements. However, the RATP was largely dissatisfied with the refurbishment of the Line 13 trains, citing problems with the contractor that handled the work, as well as workmanship defects. Though it is expected that the trains on Line 8 will be refurbished next, followed by the trains on Line 7, the RATP has explored other avenues to carry out the work, on a lesser scale (similar to the refurbishment of MF 67 trains on Lines 10 and 12).

While seating on board the trains are extremely similar, noticeable differences between the two projects include:

- Keeping the 2X2 (2 forward-facing seats per side) configuration in the middle of each car, instead of going to the 2X1 (alternating 2 forward-facing seats on one side and 1 forward facing seat on the opposing side) configuration seen on the 13. The ends of each car have been fitted with longitudinal seating as their counterparts on the 13 were.
- Retaining the ceiling lighting panels, grates, and other components as opposed to replacing them completely.
- Retaining elements such as handlebars and static strip maps. Some new handlebars were added to each car however.
- Not installing automated announcements, unlike their counterparts on the 13 that are equipped with such announcements, as well as electronic strip maps and door warning lights.
- Retaining user-activated doors, instead of reprogramming all doors to open automatically at the same time.

Additionally, renovated trains on the 7 and 8 will sport the new joint RATP/Île-de-France Mobilités (formerly known as STIF) blue/white livery reminiscent of the original one.

== Formations ==
In date of 27 December 2024:

- 195 MF77 trainsets were in service and were formed as shown below, with three motored ("M") cars and two non-powered trailer ("T") cars or 3M2T.
- 68 trainsets on Line 7 based in Choisy (Paris) dépot
- 62 trainsets on Line 8 based in Lourmel (Paris) and Créteil dépot
- 65 trainsets on Line 13 based in Châtillon and Pleyel (Saint-Denis) dépot
- Five cars (M.30138 - B.32138 - NA.31069 - B.32154 - M.30154) (Note: cars in bold were came from original trainset 069, while cars in italics were came from original trainset 077. The remaining two cars from original trainset 069 after reformation (B.32137 - M.30137) were paired with the remaining three cars (M.30153 - B.32153 - NA.31077) from original trainset 077 to form the current trainset 077)was converted to "BOA" experimental train and it was scrapped in 1980.
- Set G009 was scrapped in 2020 following a derailment at Châtillon-Montrouge station.

Line 7	<- La Courneuve Ivry/Villejuif ->				
Line 8	<- Balard Créteil ->				
Line 13	<- Châtillon Asnières-Gennevilliers/Saint-Denis ->				
Car n°	1	2	3	4	5
Designation	M	T	M	T	M
Numbering	M 30xxx	B 32xxx	NA 31xxx	B 32xxx	M 30xxx
equipement	CH	CP, SIV	CH	CP, SIV	CH

- CH: Choppers (Kesar system)
- CP: Air compressor
- SIV: Static inverter
- Car 3 was formerly a 1st class car

== Fleet ==
The total number of MF77 trainsets is 195: 68 trains on Line 7, 62 on Line 8, and 65 on Line 13.

- Listing Fleet MF77 (in French)

On the Line 7 trainsets, at each carriage's end, a pair of lights indicate which southern branch the train is headed to : a yellow one indicates the train heads to Ivry, a blue one for Villejuif. The Line 13 trainsets do not have this feature despite the line's two northern branches; instead, automated announcements announce the direction of the train prior to the split between the two branches.

== Technical specifications ==
- Train-sets delivered: 197
- Configuration: M+T+M+T+M (Formation I)
- Overall length: 77.40 metres (253 ft 11 in)
- Maximum width: 2.45 metres (8 ft 0 in)
- Weight: 131 tonnes (289,000 lb) — 29.5 tonnes (65,000 lb) for the motor coaches, 21.5 tonnes (47,000 lb) for the trailers
- Material: Aluminium alloy
- Power: 1,590 kilowatts (2,130 hp)
- Acceleration: 0.90 metres per second squared (3.0 ft/s^{2}) under normal load
- Braking: Dynamic brakes (rheostatic) with regeneration down to 7 km/h (4.3 mph), railway air brake with one disc brake on all axles and one brake shoe on the rims of trailer (unpowered) wheels
- Bogies: Cast solid wheel
- Maximum speed: 100 kilometres per hour (62 mph)
- Authorized speed: 70 kilometres per hour (43 mph)
- Doors: 3 plug doors per side, per car, with manual operation and an opening width of 1,575 millimetres (62.0 in)
- Air conditioning: None (forced ventilation)
- Seats: 128 + 118 (folding seats)
- Capacity: 574 people

== Gallery ==
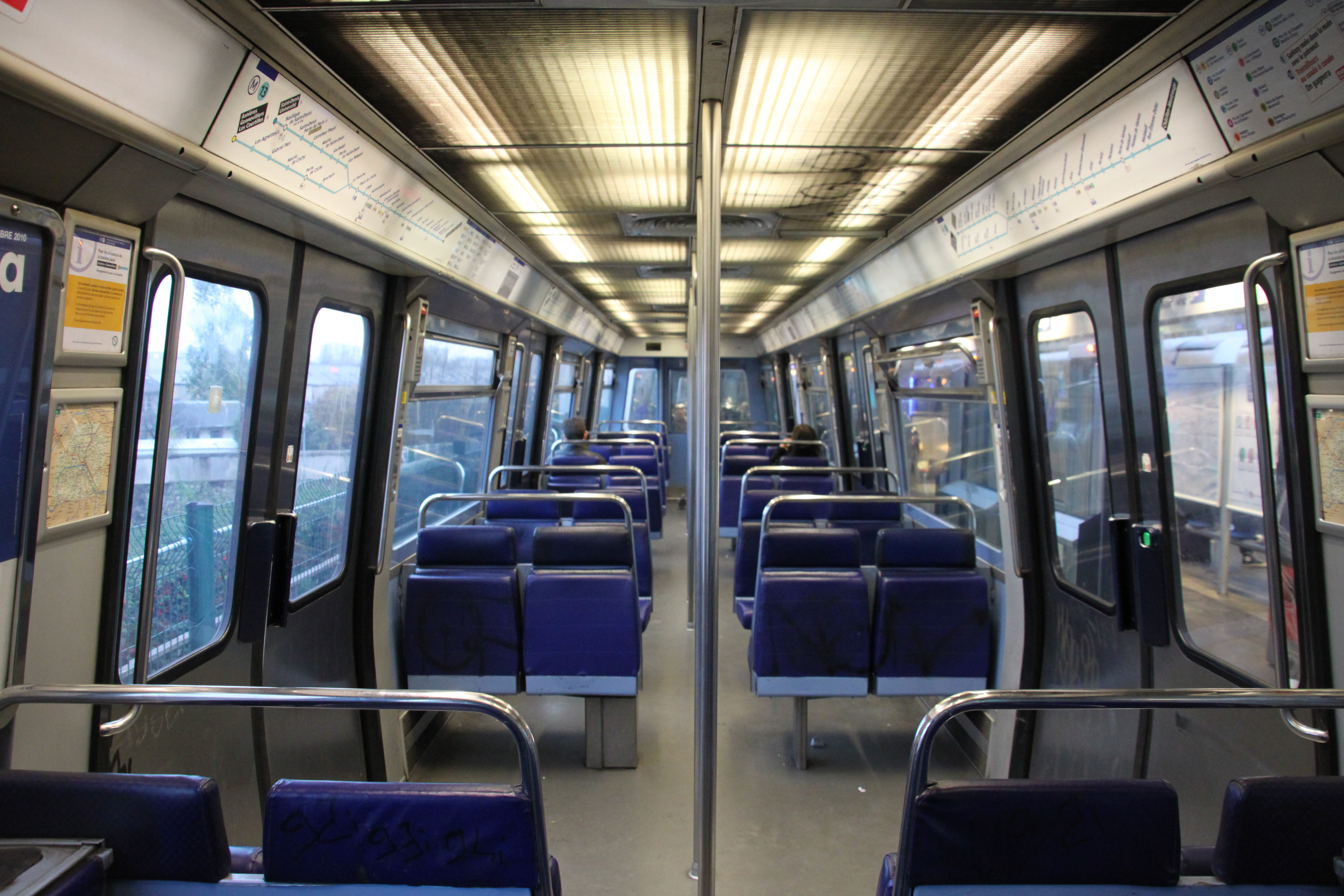
Old interior

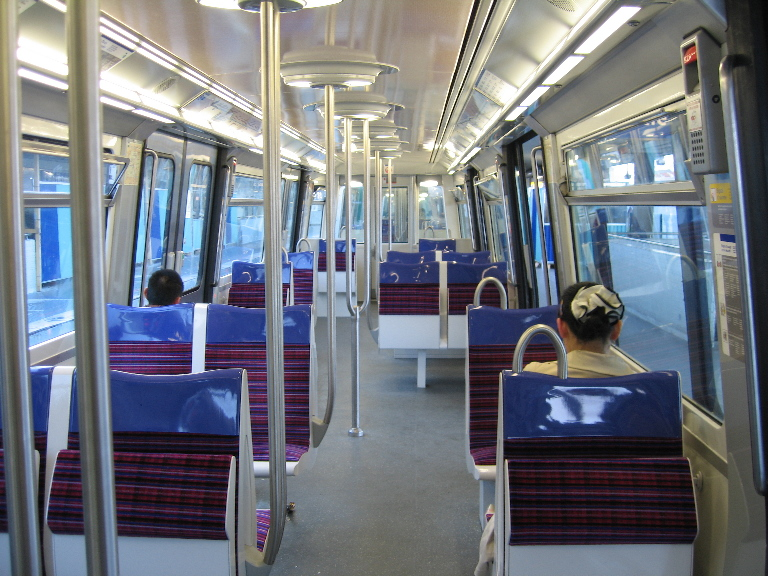
Renovated interior (Line 13)

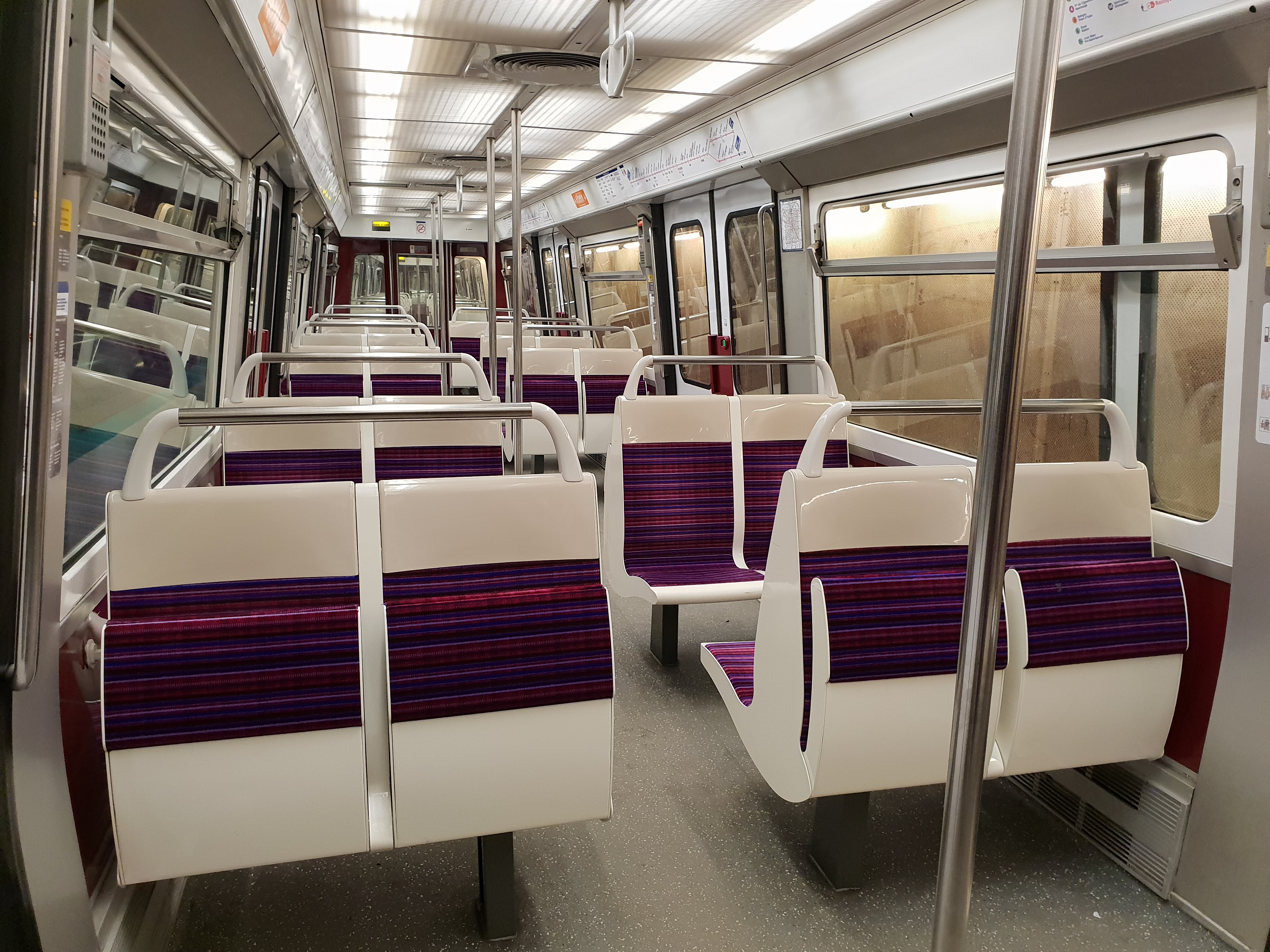
Renovated interior (Line 7)

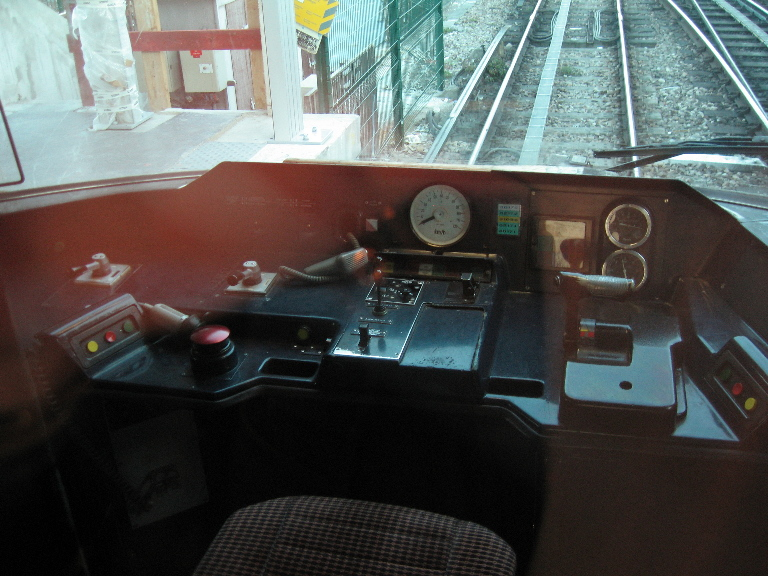
Driver's cab

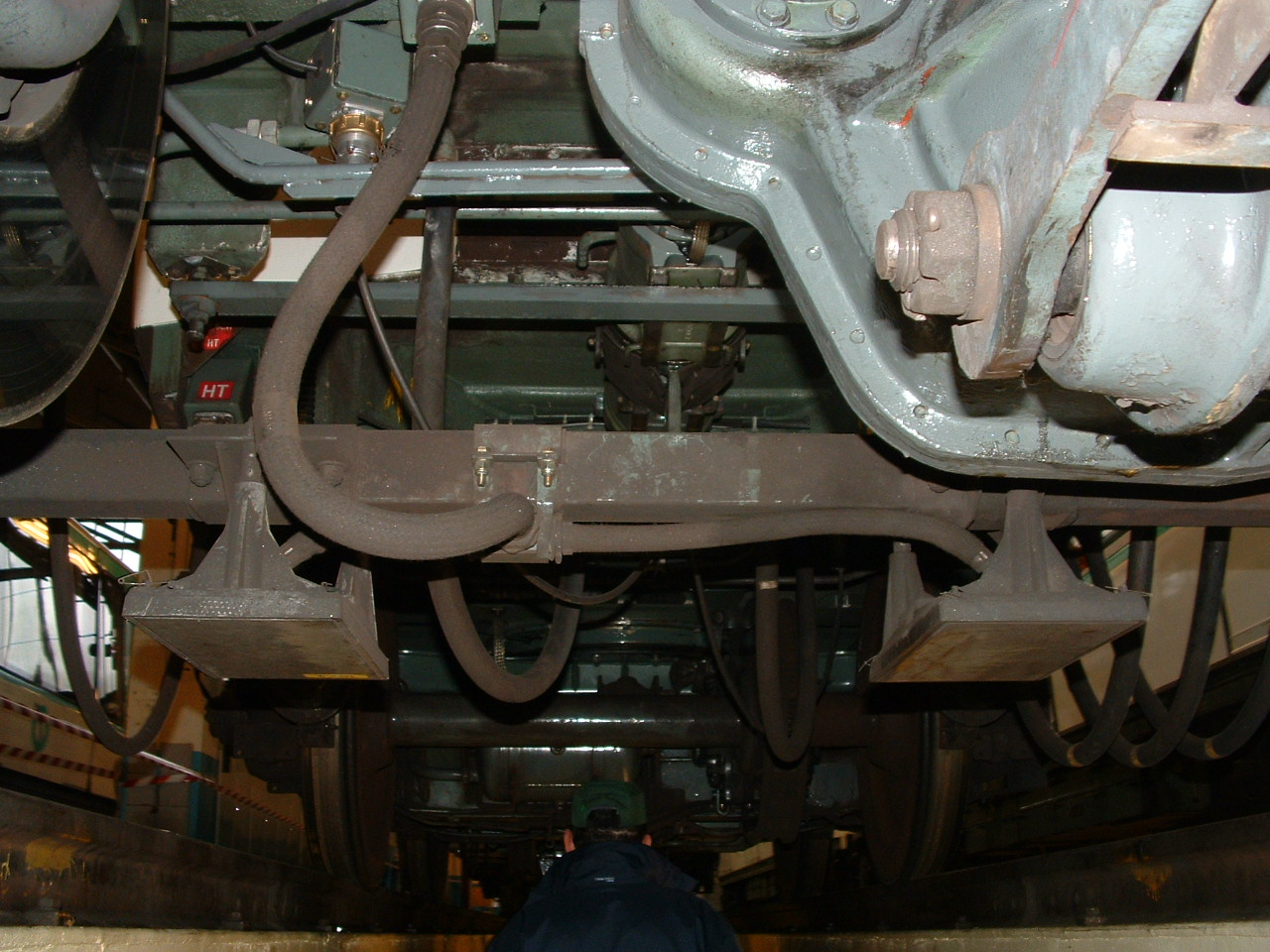
Underframe of the front car of a MF 77 train, showing the autopilot equipment

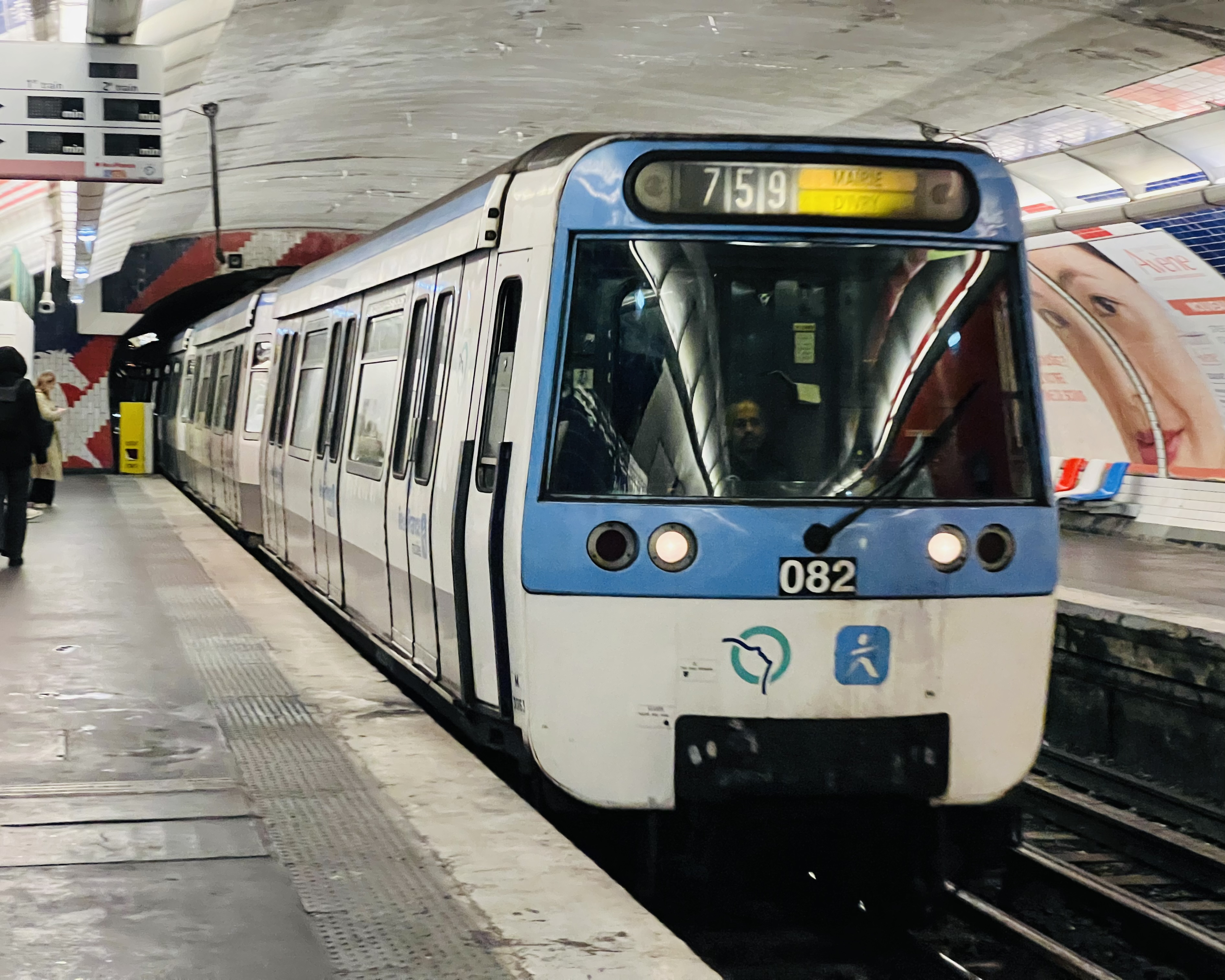
New livery on a refurbished MF 77 train, sporting the IDFM logo

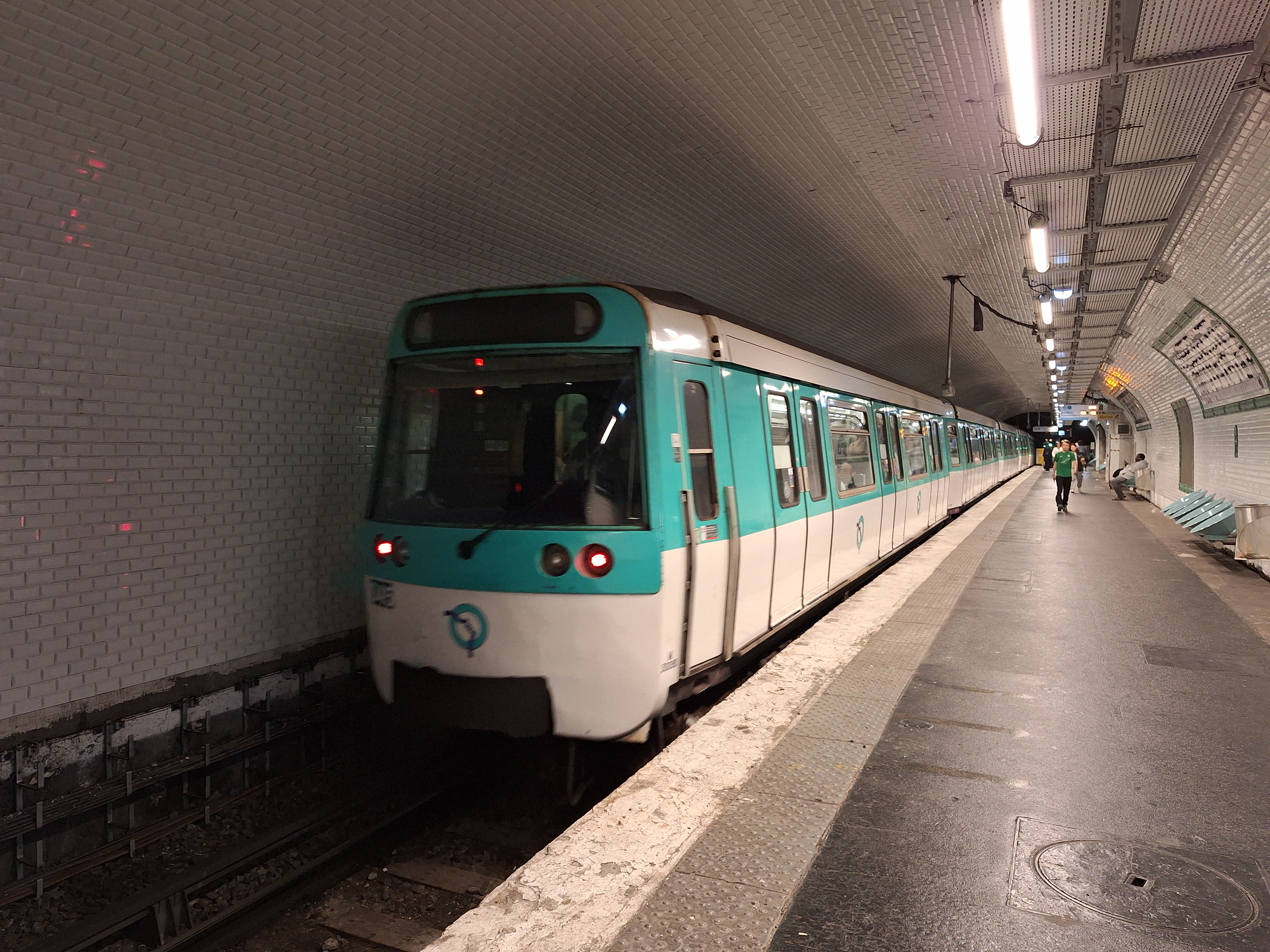
Older RATP livery on an MF 77 train, still used on the refurbished sets on line 13

== Other networks ==
- Lisbon Metro had a forked variant called ML79
