= MF 19 =

Paris Metro train

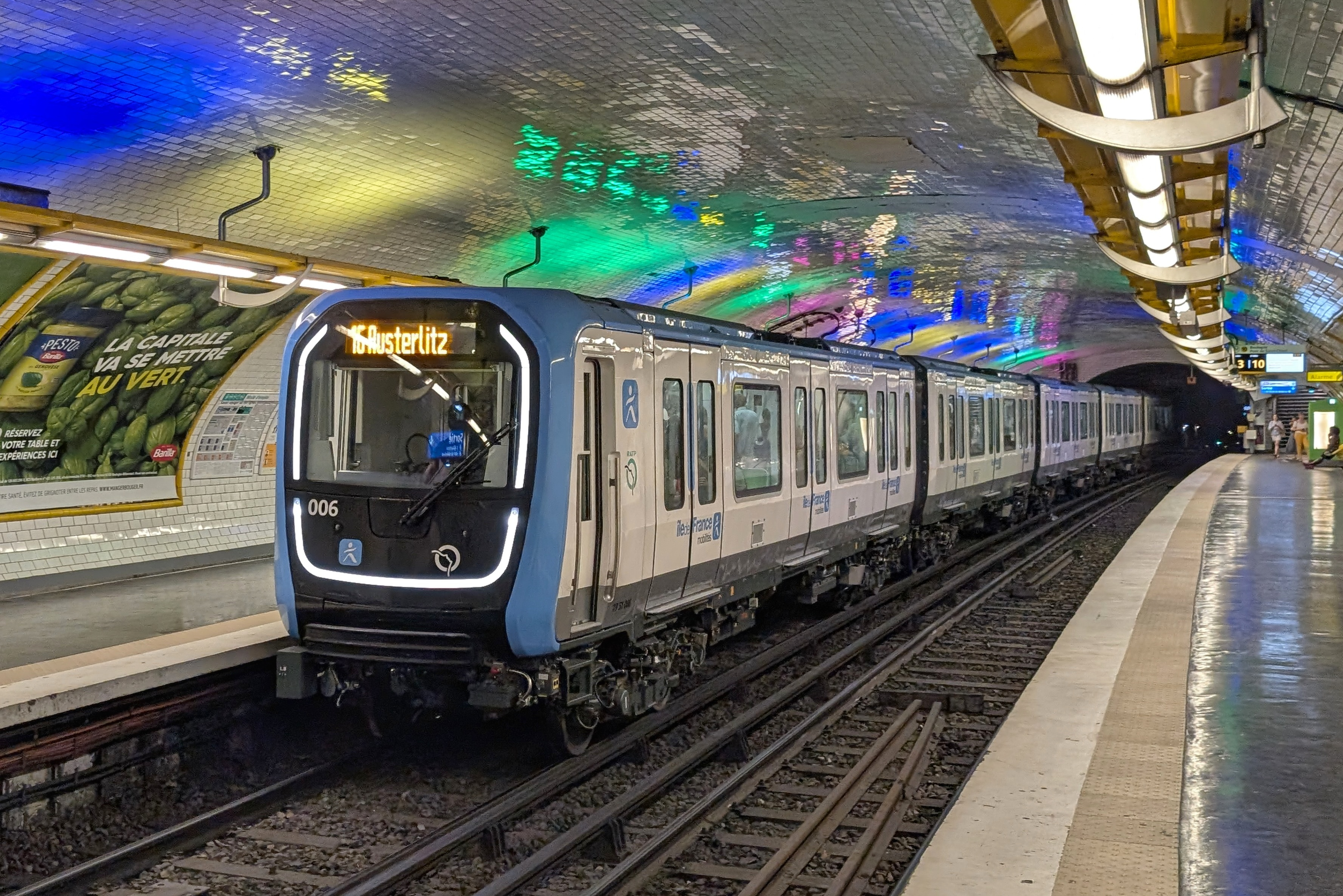
- MF 19 train arriving at Odéon on Line 10
- In service: 2025 (Line 10); Future; 2026 (Line 7bis); 2027 (Line 3bis); 2027 (Line 13); 2028 (Line 12); 2029 (Line 8); 2031 (Line 3); 2033 (Line 7)
- Manufacturer: Alstom
- Family name: Metropolis
- Replaced: MF 67, MF 77, MF 88
- Constructed: 2022-Present
- Entered service: 2025-Present
- Number under construction: Up to 410 trains
- Number built: 11 (3 prototypes)
- Number in service: 7
- Formation: 4-car sets (Lines 3bis and 7bis); 5-car sets (Lines 3, 7, 8, 10, 12, 13)
- Operator: RATP Group
- Line served: Paris Metro Paris Metro Line 3 Paris Metro Line 3bis Paris Metro Line 7 Paris Metro Line 7bis Paris Metro Line 8 Paris Metro Line 10 Paris Metro Line 12 Paris Metro Line 13

Specifications
- Train length: 61 metres (200 ft); 76 metres (249 ft); 77.5 metres (254 ft)
- Doors: 3 per side
- Maximum speed: 70 km/h
- Traction system: Alstom OptONIX IGBT-VVVF
- Traction motors: 3-phase AC induction motor
- Electric systems: Third rail, 750 V DC
- Current collection: Contact shoe
- Track gauge: 1,435 mm (4 ft 8 1/2 in) standard gauge

The MF 19 (Métro Fer appel d'offres 2019; 2019 procurement rail metro) is a class of rolling stock on the Paris Metro. Being built by Alstom, it was ordered to replace existing trains on Lines 3, 3bis, 7, 7bis, 8, 10, 12 and 13, starting in 2025.

The MF 19 will come in two formations. Lines 3bis and 7bis will use 4-car trains, an upgrade from the current 3-car sets. Lines 3, 7, 8, 10, 12 and 13 will use 5-car sets. Up to 410 trains (2036 cars) are to be ordered, which by the mid 2030’s will be the most common train type in the system, running on nearly half of the lines of the Metro. The first MF 19 to enter service did so on October 16, 2025. The MF19 is scheduled to enter service on line 7bis at the end of 2026, and then on line 13 in the summer of 2027.

== History ==
=== Background ===
In the years 2008 to 2016, RATP replaced MF 67 trains with MF 01 on Lines 2, 5, and 9, this decreasing the average age of Parisian rolling stock. However, many lines still have trains that are reaching the end of their lifespan. Since the MF 67 trains, which have an average age of 43 to 53 years are getting older, RATP planned to replace those trains as well as the MF 77 trains, which are around 40 years old. Additionally, the decision was made to replace the MF 88 trains due to their lack of reliability. The previously cited rolling stock, MF 67, has grown to be somewhat uncomfortable for passengers due to a lack of space, uncomfortable seats and especially a big amount of noise produced. Thus, an important goal of the MF 19 is to improve the traveling conditions of parisians, because the MF 67 travels on four lines of the Paris metro (highest amount of lines using the same rolling stock). The call for tenders was launched in May 2017, and potential candidates that responded to the call included the Italian-Japanese Ansaldo-Hitachi, the Spanish Construcciones y Auxiliar de Ferrocarriles, and the French-Canadian consortium Alstom-Bombardier. Originally, the contract was supposed to replace at least 338 trains.

The first trains were expected to be put into service in 2024. Île-de-France Mobilités asked RATP, Paris' transportation authority, to accelerate the replacement of trains on lines 3bis, 7bis, and 10. The initial schedule, presented in April 2019, included the following timeline: line 10 in 2024, lines 3bis and 7bis between 2024 and 2026, line 13 in 2027, and between 2026 and 2030 on lines 3, 7, 8, and 12.

=== Contract award and production ===
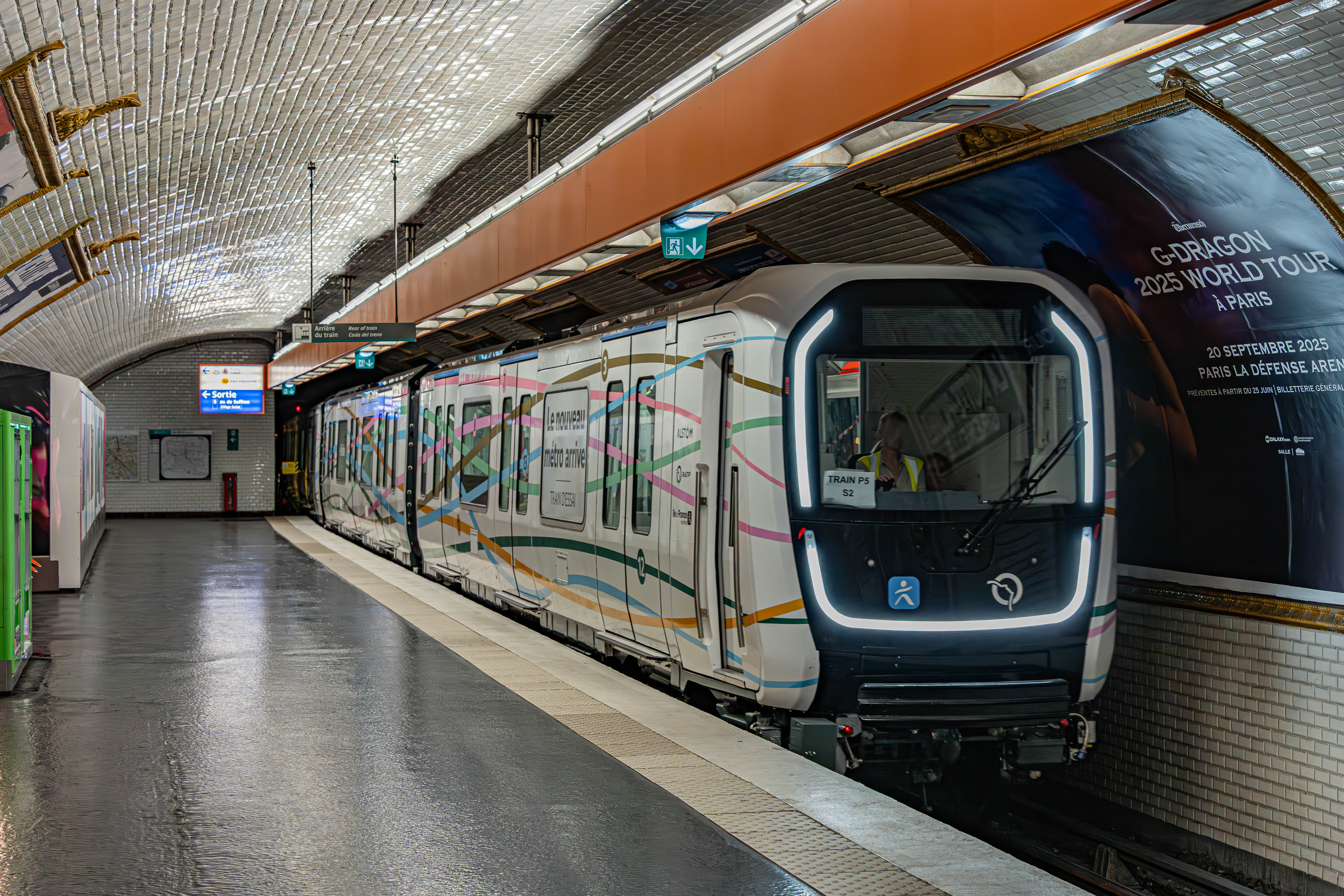
The MF 19 on tests at La Motte-Picquet–Grenelle on Line 10.

On 29 November 2019, Île-de-France Mobilités announced that the contract was awarded to the French-Canadian consortium Alstom-Bombardier for a maximum order of 410 MF 19 trains, at a cost of 2.9 billion euros. The firm order consists of 44 trains for lines 3bis, 7bis, and 10.

The contract was signed at the end of 2019. The deployment of the new trains was initially planned to start from 2024 and finish by 2035.

Since March 2020, Bombardier Transport employees have been working on the design of the MF 19 trains remotely. In March 2022, the production of MF 19 metro trains began. In November 2022, during a visit to the Alstom factories, a front end frame of a train was presented, showing the choice of a front end design based on the second option among the three choices presented during the bidding process in 2019.

On 7 December 2022, Île-de-France Mobilités approved the adaptation works for stations and infrastructure on lines 13 and 8 to accommodate the new trains. The expected start of service is estimated to be in 2027 for line 13 and 2030 for line 8. For line 13, some trains will later be operated in automatic mode as part of the planned full automation by 2035.

In March 2023, Île-de-France Mobilités announced a modified delivery schedule for the trains. It is expected to start in 2024 with the replacement of MF 67 trains on line 10, followed by the replacement of MF 88 trains in 2025, followed by MF 67 trains on line 3bis in the following year, MF 77 trains on line 13 in 2027, MF 67 trains on line 12 in 2028, MF 77 trains on line 8 in 2029, MF 67 trains on line 3 in 2030, and finally MF 77 trains on line 7 in 2032.

However, due to many delays, it was announced in December 2023 that the MF 19 will enter in service on line 10 in end-2025, followed by the replacement of MF 88 trains in 2026, followed by MF 67 trains on line 3bis in 2027, MF 77 trains on line 13 in the same year, MF 67 trains on line 12 in 2028, MF 77 trains on line 8 in 2029, MF 67 trains on line 3 in 2031, and finally MF 77 trains on line 7 in 2033.

In March 2025, the first MF 19 train underwent testing on line 10.

On 26 September 2025, the first MF19 train was delivered; it entered service on Line 10 on 16 October 2025.

== Characteristics ==
The trains will exist in three versions: two with a driver's cab (designated CC) and one without a cab (designated CA). They will be equipped with the OCTYS communications-based train control system for equipped lines, and with the PA135 driver-attended automatic train control system, which is already in place in several Paris metro lines.

The interior will be arranged in two types. On lines 3, 3bis, 7bis, 10, and 12, the trains will have more seating arranged in a “confort” scheme. On lines 7, 8, and 13, they will have more standing room in a “capacity” scheme, given the higher demand on those lines.

As part of the automation of line 13, for which studies were commissioned in April 2019, an automatic version (CA) of the MF 19 trains will be ordered. The rolling stock can also be converted as the trains are designed to transition from manual to automatic operation to accompany the automation of the Paris Metro network. The automation was approved on 7 December 2022 by the board of directors of Île-de-France Mobilités. The trains are expected to initially operate in manual mode before being converted to automatic mode for full automation of the line by 2035.

The manufacturer Bombardier (acquired by Alstom in 2021) announced a 20% reduction in energy consumption compared to the MF 77 trains through the full use of regenerative braking and full LED lighting.

The three versions for the MF19 are as follows:

- A short version 62 metres (203 feet 5 inches) in length with four cars for lines 3bis and 7bis.
- A medium version 76 metres (249 feet 4 inches) in length with five cars for lines 3, 10, and 12.
- A long version 77.4 metres (253 feet 11 inches) in length with five cars for lines 7, 8, and 13.

The long version is planned for lines currently equipped with MF 77 trains, which required relocating operational equipment at the front of the stations (such as clocks or rearview screens) to niches at the beginning of the tunnel, creating a noticeable difference in the appearance of the trains by a slightly longer gangway.

== Formations ==
As of 4 October 2025:

- 4 trainsets were in test for L10 and were formed as shown below, with three motored ("M") cars and two non-powered trailer ("T") cars or 3M2T.
- 5 cars trainsets are in "Formation III" (3M2T)
- 4 cars trainsets are in "Formation V" (2M2T)

=== 5 cars short trainset ===
	<- Pont de Levallois Galliéni ->				
	<- Pont de St Cloud Gare d'Austerlitz ->				
	<- Mairie d'Issy Mairie d'Aubervilliers ->				
Car n°	1	2	3	4	5
Designation	S	N	N	N	S
Numbering	19 S1 0xx	19 N1 0xx	19 N3 0xx	19 N2 0xx	19 S2 0xx
equipement		VVVF	VVVF	VVVF	

- VVVF: Inverters
- CP: Air compressor
- SIV: Static inverter

=== 5 cars long trainset ===
	<- La Courneuve Ivry/Villejuif ->				
	<- Balard Créteil ->				
	<- Châtillon Asnières-Gennevilliers/Saint-Denis ->				
Car n°	1	2	3	4	5
Designation	S	N	N	N	S
Numbering	19 S1 0xx	19 N1 0xx	19 N3 0xx	19 N2 0xx	19 S2 0xx
equipement		VVVF	VVVF	VVVF	

- VVVF: Inverters
- CP: Air compressor
- SIV: Static inverter

=== 4 cars trainset ===
	<- Gambetta Pte de Lilas ->			
	<- Pré St Gervais Louis Blanc ->			
Car n°	1	2	3	4
Designation	S	N	N	S
Numbering	19 S1 0xx	19 N1 0xx	19 N2 0xx	19 S2 0xx
equipement		VVVF	VVVF	

- VVVF: Inverters
- CP: Air compressor
- SIV: Static inverter
