= Botzaris station =

Paris Metro station

Botzaris
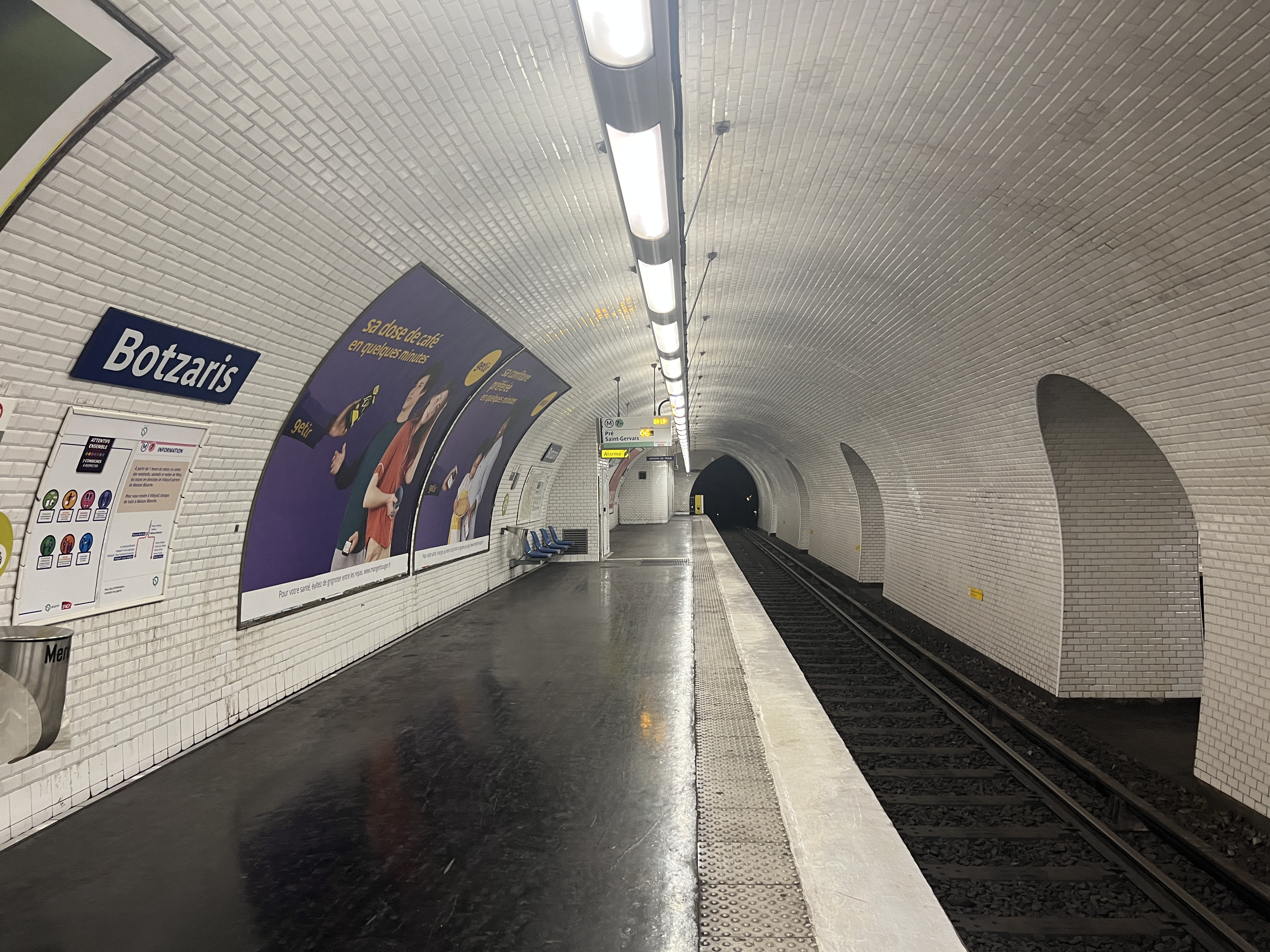
- Station platform

General information
- Location: 19th arrondissement of Paris; Île-de-France; France
- Coordinates: 48°52′46″N 2°23′17″E
- System: Paris Metro station
- Owner: RATP
- Operator: RATP
- Line: Paris Metro Paris Metro Line 7bis
- Platforms: 2 side platforms
- Tracks: 2

Other information
- Station code: 23-09
- Fare zone: 1

History
- Opened: 18 January 1911

Passengers
- 511,339 (2020)

Services
Preceding station	Paris Metro	Following station
Buttes Chaumont towards Louis Blanc	Line 7bis Loop westbound only	Danube One-way operation
Buttes Chaumont towards Louis Blanc	Line 7bis Loop eastbound only	Place des Fêtes towards Pré-Saint-Gervais
Location
- Location within Paris

Botzaris (French pronunciation: [bɔtsaʁis]) is a station on Line 7bis of the Paris Metro. Located in the 19th arrondissement, it was named after Markos Botsaris, a Souliot chieftain, general of the Greek revolutionary army and hero of the Greek War of Independence.

== History ==
The station opened on 18 January 1911 as part of a branch of line 7 from Louis Blanc to Pré-Saint-Gervais, 18 days after the commissioning of the first section of line 7 between Opéra and Porte de la Villette due to difficulties during its construction. As the station is built in a backfilled quarry, it was constructed with arches over each of the tracks to strengthen the station box. On 3 December 1967, this branch was separated from line 7, becoming line 7bis.

As part of the Un métro + beau programme by the RATP, the station was renovated and modernised on 25 April 2003.

On 12 February 2016, the Guimard entrance on rue Botzaris was listed as a historical monument.

In 2019, the station was used by 993,450 passengers, making it the 292th busiest of the Metro network out of 302 stations.

In 2020, the station was used by 511,339 passengers amidst the COVID-19 pandemic, making it the 290th busiest of the Metro network out of 305 stations.

Botzaris station is mentioned in the 1967 Jean-Pierre Melville film Le Samouraï.

== Passenger services ==
=== Access ===
The station has a single Guimard entrance at rue Botzaris leading to the right of the south-eastern end of Parc des Buttes-Chaumont,

=== Station layout ===
G	Street Level
B1	Mezzanine
Line 7bis platforms	Side platform, doors will open on the right
Line 7bis platforms	Inbound	← toward Louis Blanc (Buttes Chaumont)
Line 7bis platforms	Outbound	toward Pré-Saint-Gervais (Place des Fêtes) → (No service eastbound: Danube)
Line 7bis platforms	Side platform, doors will open on the right

=== Platforms ===
Botzaris has a standard configuration with 2 tracks surrounded by 2 side platforms. A central wall exists between the tracks to better suit the geological constraints of the terrain and to strengthen the station box.

=== Other connections ===
The station is also served by lines 48, 60, and 71 of the RATP bus network.

== Gallery ==
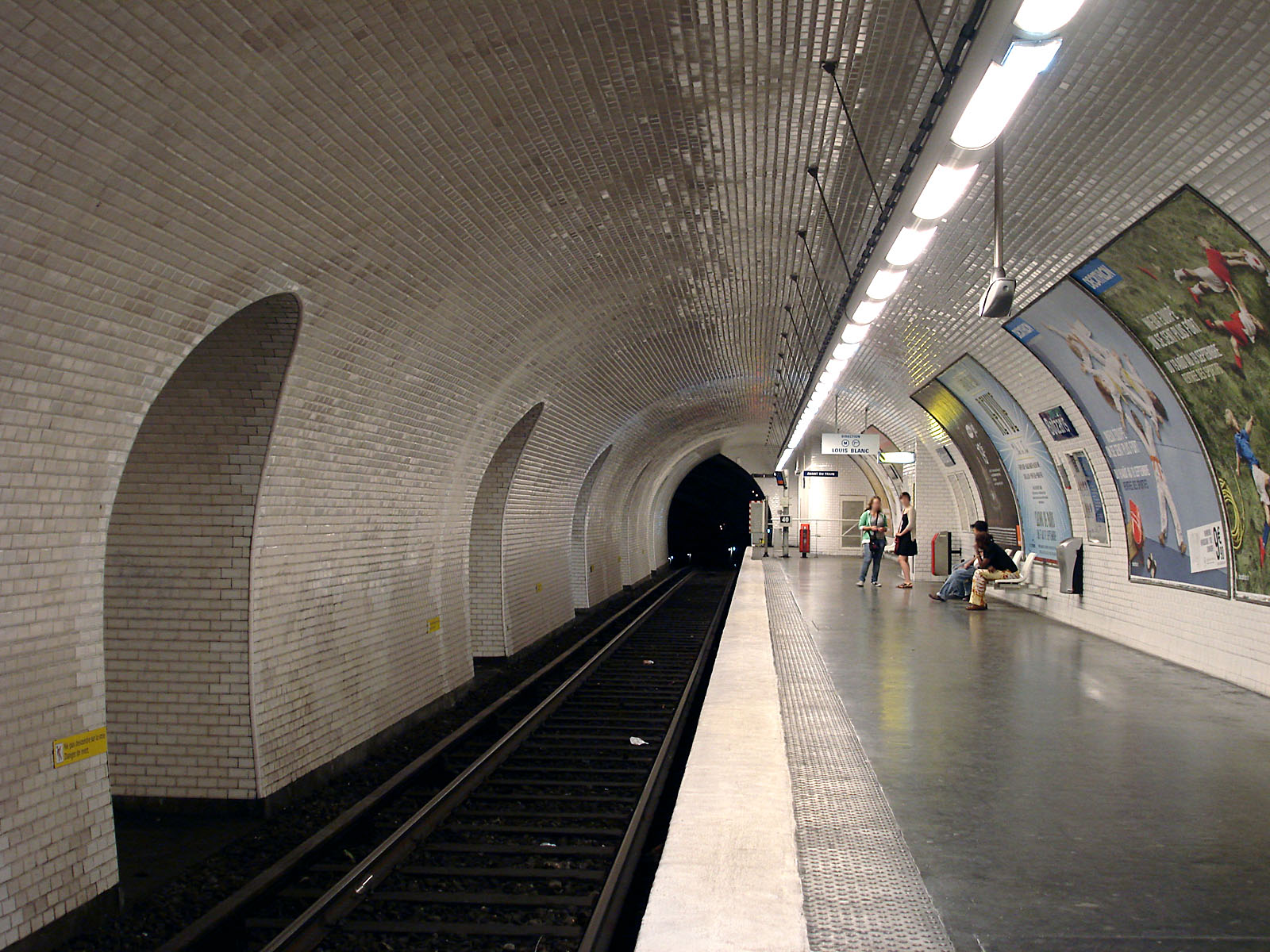
Platform in the direction of Louis Blanc

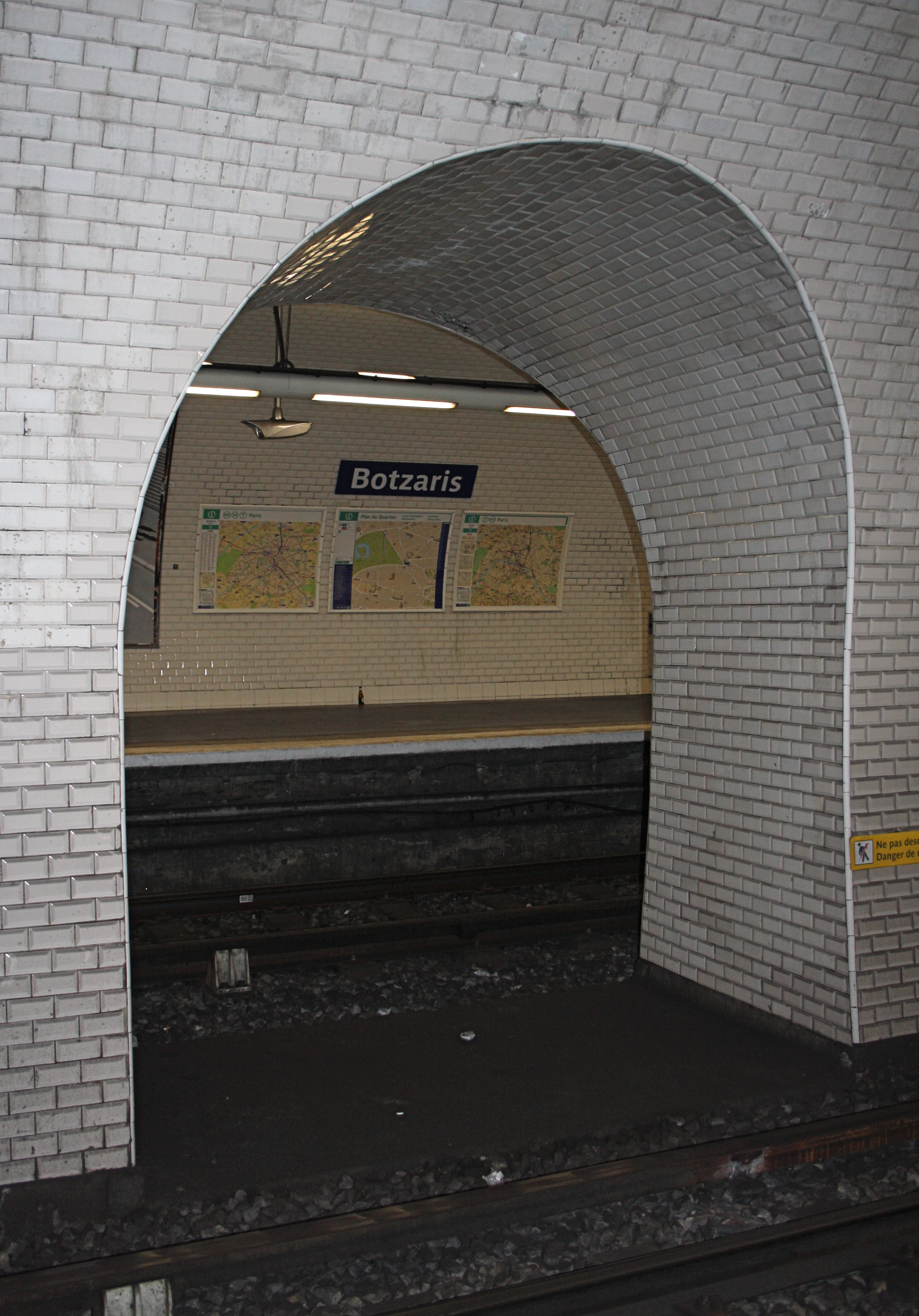
View of the northbound half-station from the southbound half-station

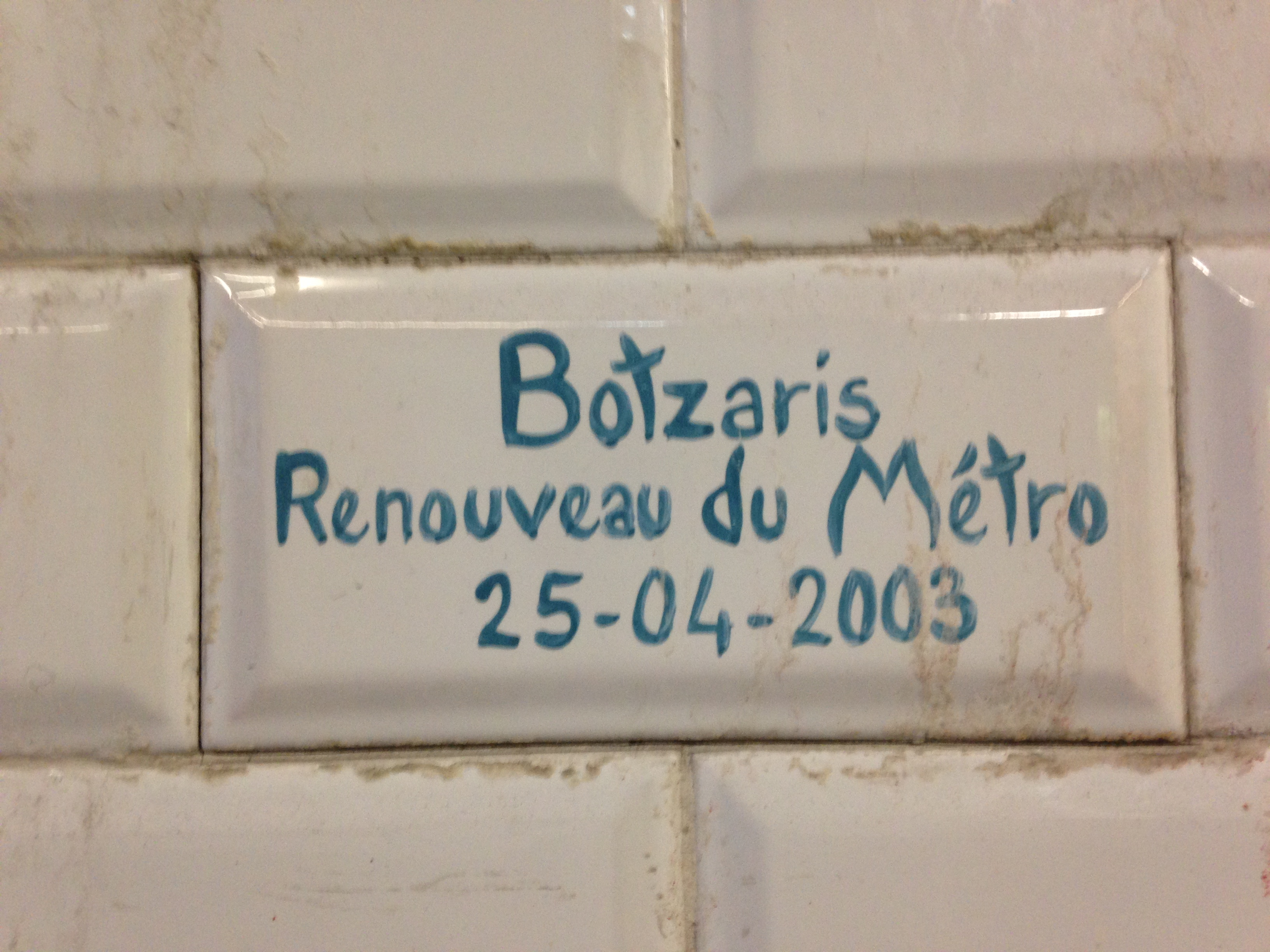
