= Buttes Chaumont station =

Metro station in Paris, France

Buttes Chaumont
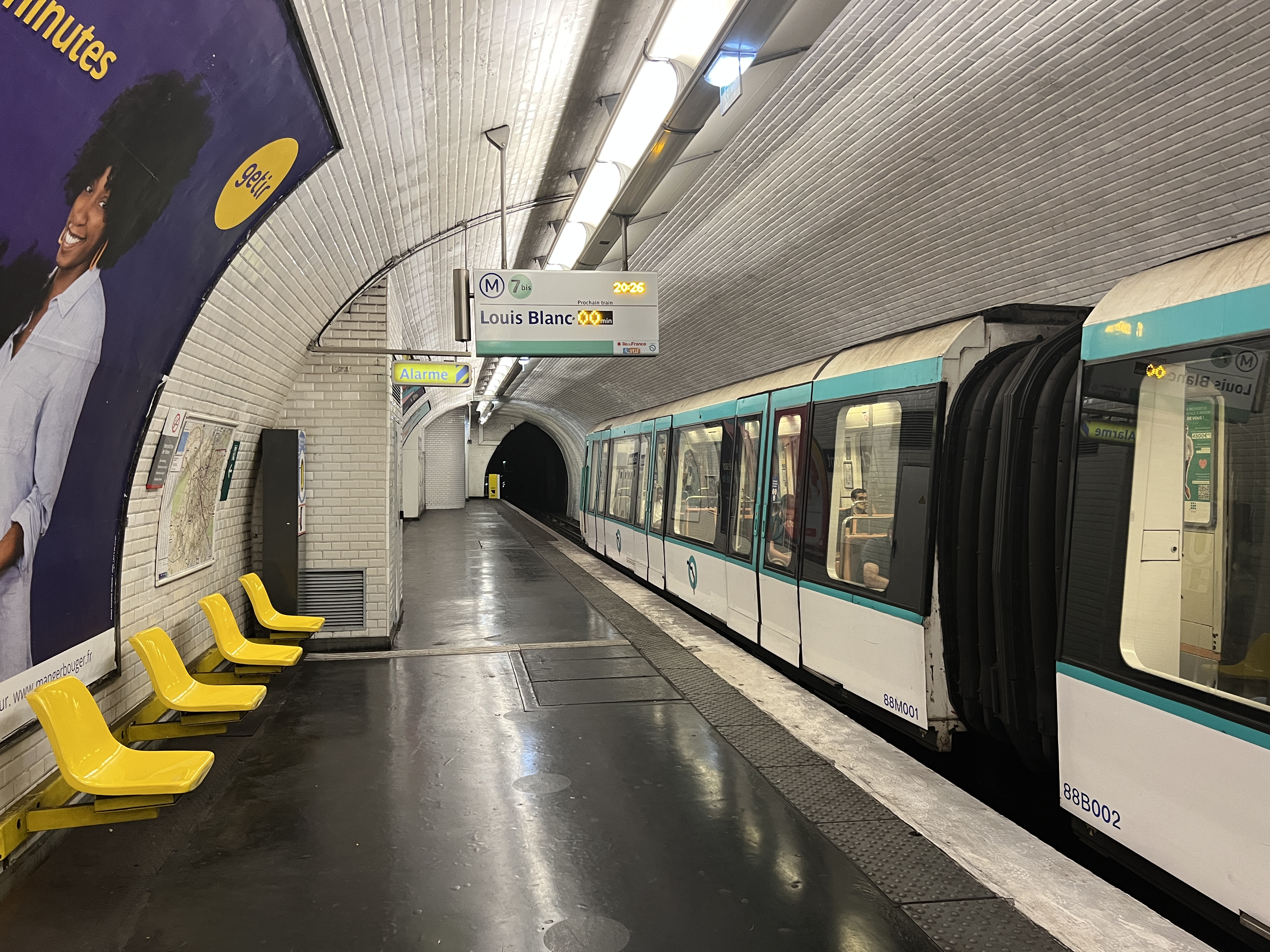
- Station platform

General information
- Location: 19th arrondissement of Paris; Île-de-France; France
- Coordinates: 48°52′43″N 2°22′54″E
- System: Paris Metro station
- Owner: RATP
- Operator: RATP
- Line: Paris Metro Paris Metro Line 7bis
- Platforms: 2 side platforms
- Tracks: 2

Other information
- Station code: 23-13
- Fare zone: 1

History
- Opened: 13 February 1912

Passengers
- 242,027 (2020)

Services
Preceding station	Paris Metro	Following station
Bolivar towards Louis Blanc	Line 7bis	Botzaris towards Pré-Saint-Gervais
Location
- Location within Paris

Buttes Chaumont (French pronunciation: [byt ʃomɔ̃]) is a station on Line 7bis of the Paris Metro. It is located on avenue Simon Bolivar in the 19th arrondissement, near the Parc des Buttes Chaumont, after which it was named.

== History ==
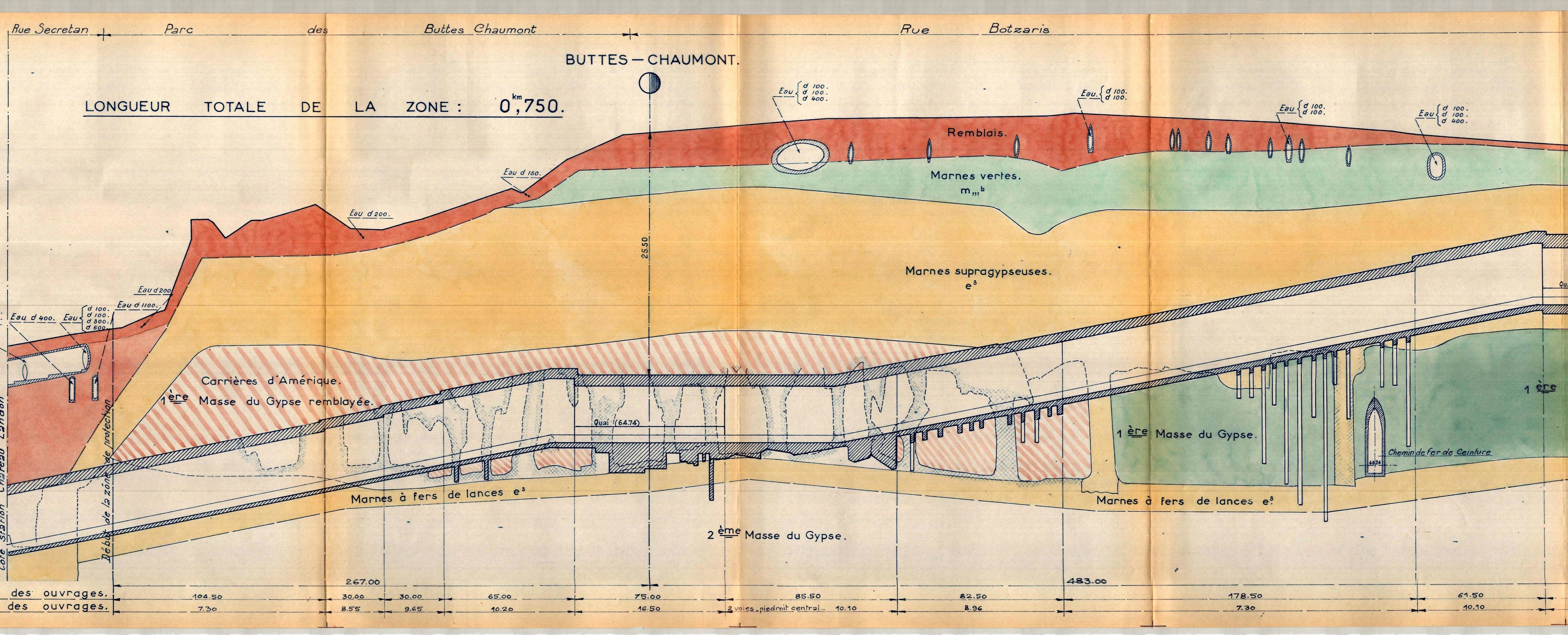
Cross section of the tunnels around Buttes Chaumont and its nearby quarries

The station opened on 13 February 1912, 13 months after the commissioning of the branch of line 7 from Louis Blanc to Pré-Saint-Gervais on 18 January 1911 due to the difficulty of its construction in a backfilled quarry. As a result, the station is built with arches over each of the tracks to strengthen the station box. On 3 December 1967 this branch was separated from line 7, becoming Line 7bis.

As part of the Un métro + beau programme by the RATP, the station was renovated and modernised on 6 May 2009.

In 2019, the station was used by 545,750 passengers, making it the 299th busiest of the Metro network out of 302 stations.

In 2020, the station was used by 242,027 passengers amidst the COVID-19 pandemic, making it the 299th busiest of the Metro network out of 305 stations.

== Passenger services ==
=== Access ===
The station has a single at rue Botzaris next to Parc des Buttes Chaumont.

=== Station layout ===
G	Street Level
B1	Mezzanine
Line 7bis platforms	Side platform, doors will open on the right
Line 7bis platforms	Inbound	← toward Louis Blanc (Bolivar)
Line 7bis platforms	Outbound	toward Pré-Saint-Gervais (Botzaris) →
Line 7bis platforms	Side platform, doors will open on the right

=== Platforms ===
Buttes Chaumont has a standard configuration with 2 tracks surrounded by 2 side platforms. A central wall exists between the tracks due to the unstable terrain and its significant depth–its platforms are one of the deepest in the network with landings between flights of stairs leading to the platforms equipped with seats for travellers to rest. It is also equipped with elevators.

=== Other connections ===
The station is also served by lines 26 and 71 of the RATP bus network.

== Gallery ==
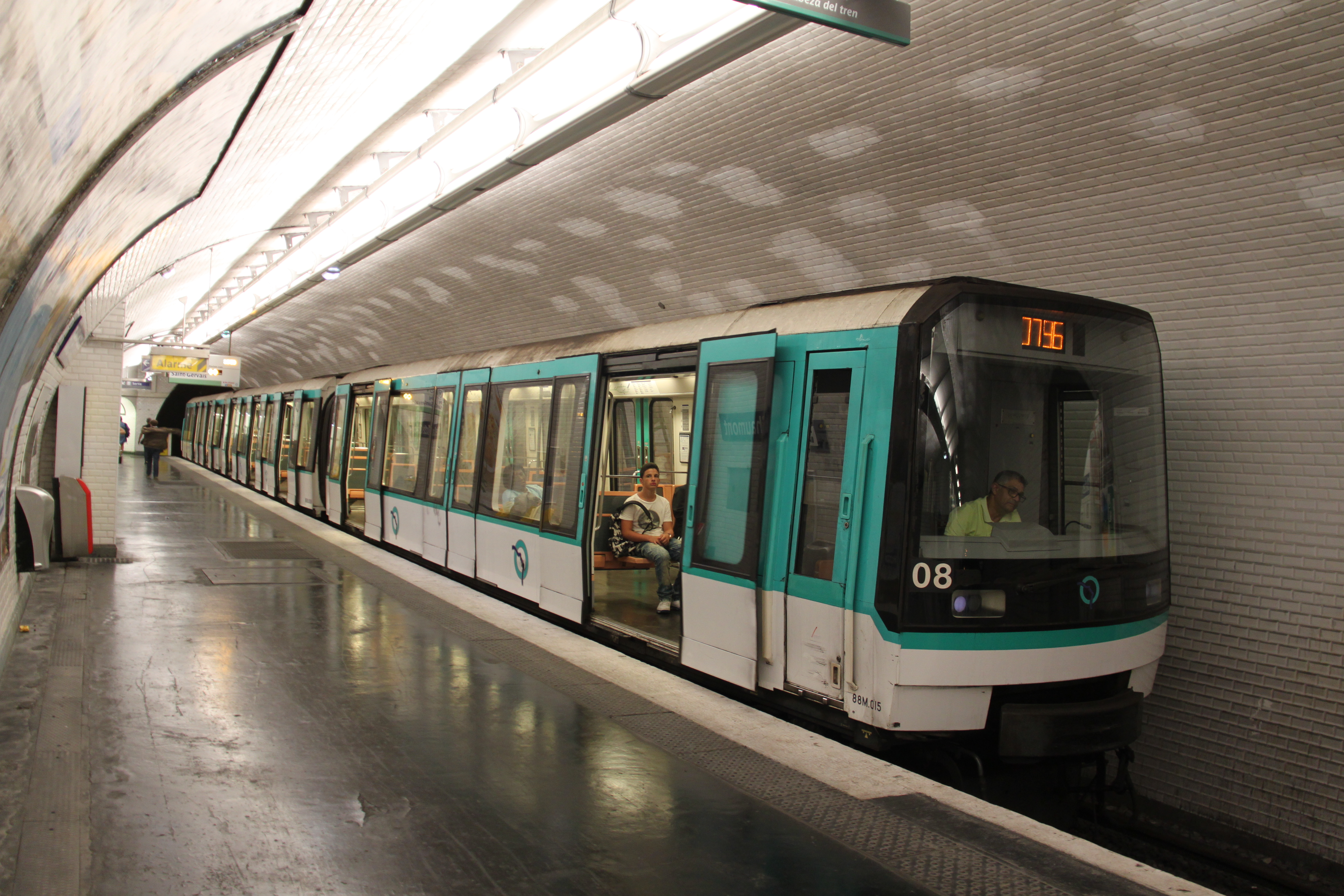
MF 88 at Buttes Chaumont

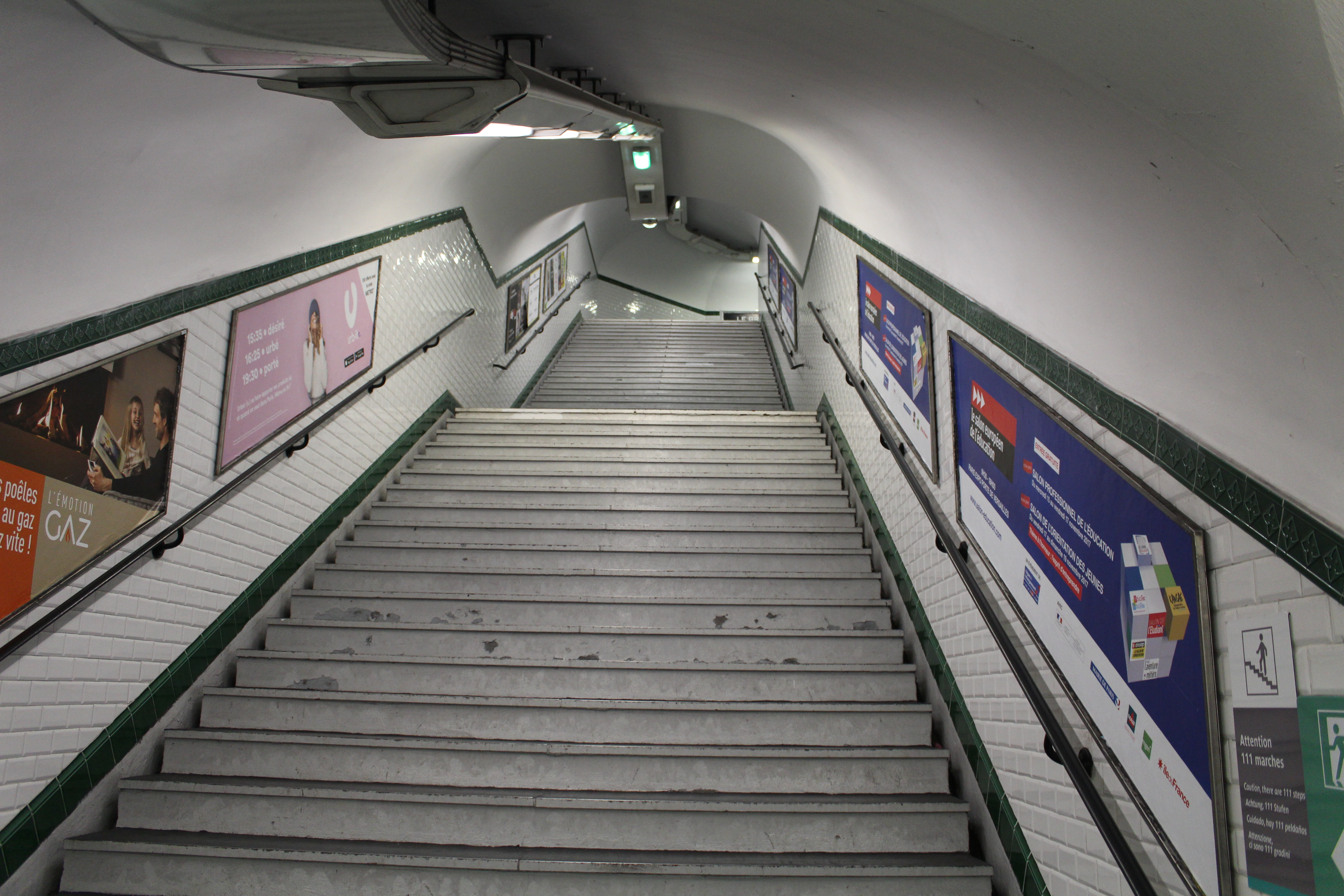
Stairs at the station
