= Danube (disambiguation) =

The Danube is the second longest river in Europe.

Danube may also refer to:

== Places ==
- Danube Banovina, a banovina or province of the Kingdom of Yugoslavia (1929–1945)
- Danube Canyon, a large submarine canyon in the Black Sea
- Danube, Minnesota, a city
- Danube, New York, a town
- Danube Planum, a rifted mesa on Jupiter's moon Io
- Danube Sinkhole, Upper Danube Nature Park, Baden-Württemberg, Germany
- Danube Vilayet, a vilayet or province of the Ottoman Empire from 1864 to 1878

== Ships ==
- Danube class motorship, a class of Russian river passenger ships
- Danube (ship), a Nourse Line sailing ship of the late 19th century
- HMS Danube, a wooden paddle vessel, and a cancelled gunboat

== Other uses ==
- Danube (geology), a timespan in the glacial history of the Alps
- Battle of the Danube, part of the Russo-Turkish War
- Danube, the codename of the Warsaw Pact invasion of Czechoslovakia in August 1968
- Danube Bridge, a bridge across the Danube River linking the Bulgarian city of Ruse and the Romanian city of Giurgiu
- Danube Bridge 2, a road and rail bridge between the cities of Calafat, Romania and Vidin, Bulgaria
- Danube class starship, a fictional starship class in the Star Trek universe
- Danube Company, a supermarket and hypermarket chain in Saudi Arabia
- Danube (Dubai Metro), a station on the Dubai Metro, UAE
- Danube station (Paris Metro), a station on the Paris Metro, France
- Danube platform, an AMD mobile platform for portable computers
- Danube Promenade, Budapest, Hungary
- Danube (restaurant), in New York

== See also ==
- Danube Army, a unit of the Russian Empire created shortly before Napoleon's invasion of Russia
- Danube Legion, a unit of Poles in the service of Napoleonic France
- Donauinsel or Danube Island, Vienna, Austria
- Donaukanal or Danube Canal, Vienna, Austria
- Donauradweg or Danube Cycle Trail, a bicycle trail along the Danube River in many countries
- Donau (disambiguation)
