= Transdanubian =

Transdanubian may refer to:

- relative term, designating someone or something related to any region beyond the Danube river (lat. trans- / beyond, over), depending on a point of observation
- Transdanubian Bulgaria, historical designation for regions under former Bulgarian rule to the north from the Danube river
- Transdanubian Hungary, designation for Hungarian regions to the west of the Danube river
  - Transdanubian Mountains (Hungary), mountains in Transdanubian regions of Hungary
  - Battle of the Transdanubian Hills, a World War II battle (1945) fought in Transdanubian regions of Hungary
- Transdanubian Romania, designation for Romanian regions to the east of the Danube river (North Dobruja)
- Transdanubian Serbia, designation for Serbian regions to the north of the Danube river (Serbian Banat and Serbian Bačka)
- Transdanubian Vienna (Transdanubien in Viennese German), designation for Vienna city districts to the northeast of the Danube river (Donaustadt and Floridsdorf)
- Transdanubian sand viper, a viper species, endemic to some Danubian regions of Bulgaria and Romania

== See also ==
- Danube (disambiguation)
