= Jaurès station =

Metro station in Paris, France

Jaurès
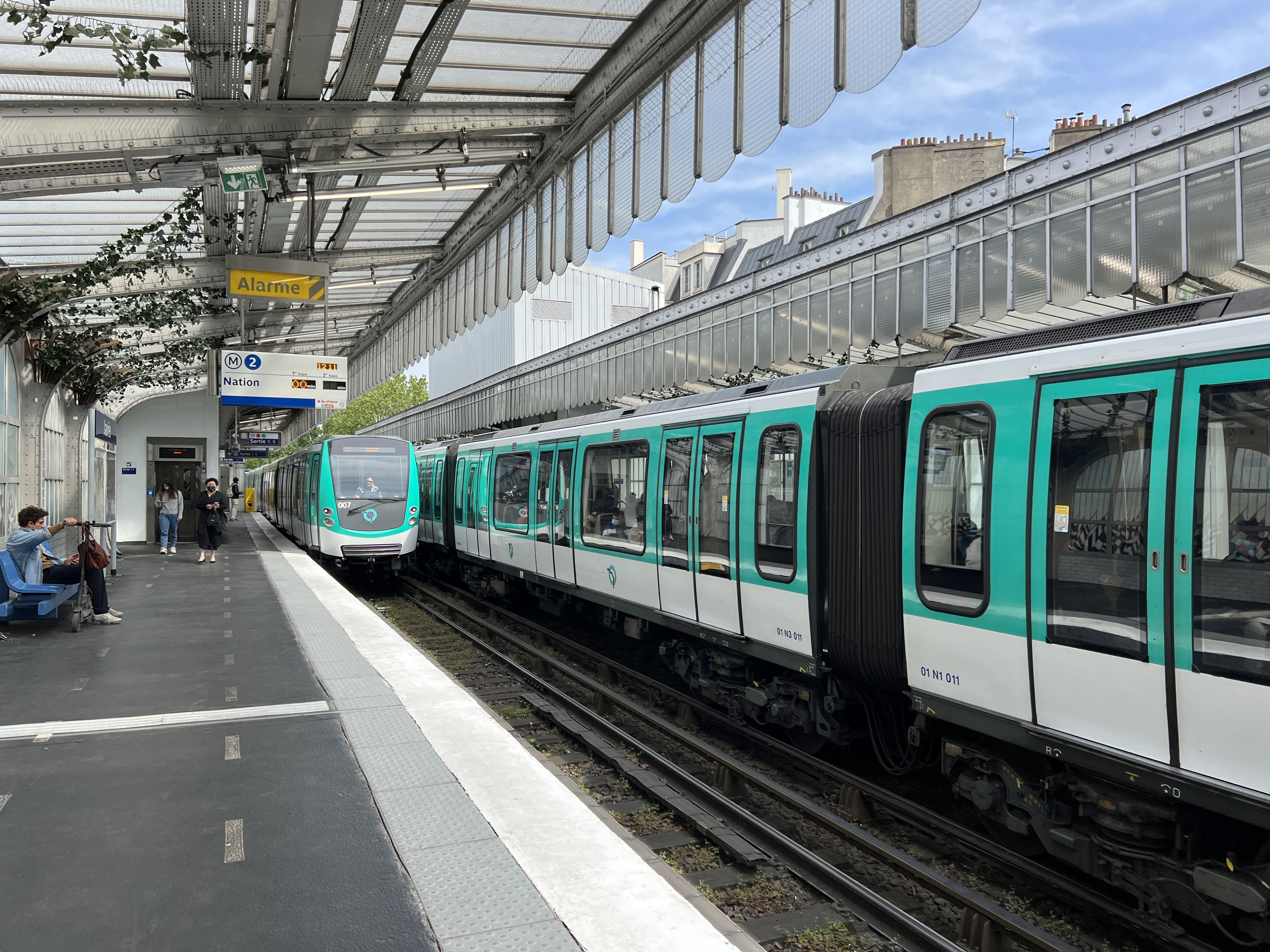
- MF 01 on line 2 at Jaurès

General information
- Location: 1, av. Jean Jaurès; 2, Place de Stalingrad; 196, Boulevard de la Villette; 10th arrondissement of Paris; Île-de-France; France
- Coordinates: 48°52′59″N 2°22′14″E
- Owner: RATP
- Operator: RATP
- Line: Paris Metro Paris Metro Line 2 Paris Metro Line 5 Paris Metro Line 7bis
- Platforms: 6 side platforms
- Tracks: 6

Construction
- Accessible: Yes (line 2 only)

Other information
- Station code: 22-12
- Fare zone: 1

History
- Opened: 23 February 1903 (Line 2); 18 January 1911 (Line 7bis); 12 October 1942 (Line 5)
- Former names: Rue d'Allemagne (1903–1914); Rue de France (1914–1914)

Passengers
- 4,055,461 (2021)

Services
| Preceding station | Paris Metro | Following station |
|---|---|---|
| Stalingrad towards Porte Dauphine | Line 2 | Colonel Fabien towards Nation |
| Stalingrad towards Place d'Italie | Line 5 | Laumière towards Bobigny–Pablo Picasso |
| Louis Blanc Terminus | Line 7bis | Bolivar towards Pré-Saint-Gervais |
Location
- Location within Paris

Jaurès (French: [ʒɔʁɛs]) is a station on Paris Metro lines 2, 5, and 7bis, in the 10th and 19th arrondissements.

== History ==
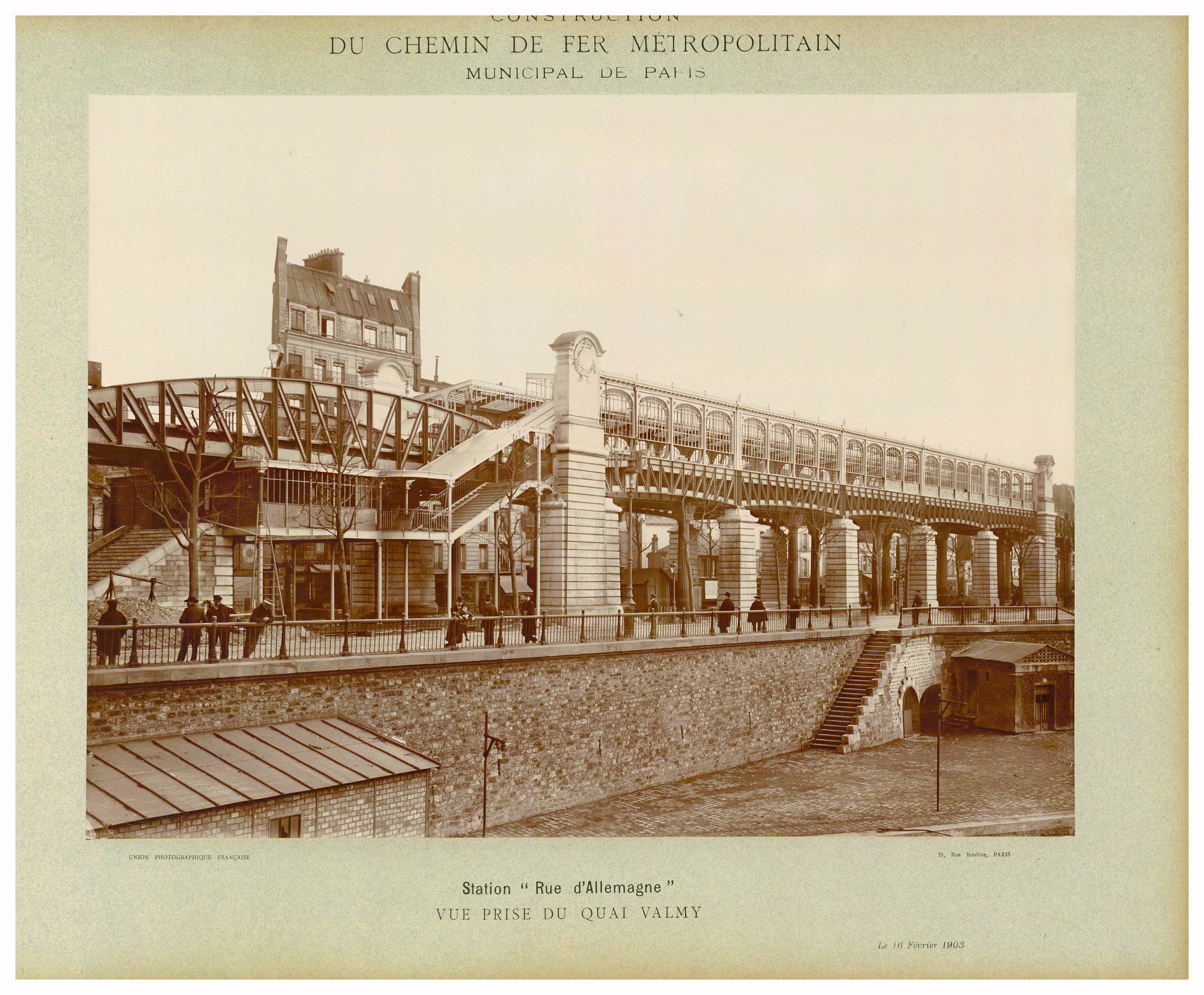
The station in 1903

The station was opened on 23 February 1903, three weeks after line 2 was extended from Anvers to Bagnolet (now Alexandre Dumas) on 31 January 1903. Line 7bis platforms opened on 18 January 1911 as part of the first section of line 7 between Opéra and Porte de la Villette, more than two months after the opening of the line on 5 November 1910. Line 5 platforms opened on 12 October 1942 with the opening of the first section of the line between Gare du Nord and Église de Pantin. On 3 December 1967 the branch to Pré Saint-Gervais was separated as 7bis with the new service terminating at Louis Blanc.

The station was originally called Rue d'Allemagne ("Street of Germany"). On 1 August 1914, just before the outbreak of World War I, the name of the street and the station were changed to Jaurès as a result of the rising tensions with Germany, a day after the assassination of Jean Jaurès (1859–1914). Boulogne–Jean Jaurès on line 10 is also named in honour of him. The station Berlin on line 13 was also renamed to Liège for similar reasons.

As part of the Renouveau du métro programme by the RATP, the station was renovated and modernised in 2014.

In 2019, the station was used by 5,836,196 passengers, making it the 64th busiest of the Metro network out of 302 stations.

In 2020, the station was used by 3,148,221 passengers amidst the COVID-19 pandemic, making it the 54th busiest of the Metro network out of 305 stations.

In 2021, the station was used by 4,055,461 passengers, making it the 52nd busiest of the Metro network out of 305 stations.

== Passenger services ==
=== Access ===
The station has six accesses:

- Access 1: Boulevard de la Villette
- Access 2: Quai de la Loire
- Access 3: avenue Jean Jaurès
- Access 4: avenue Secrétan
- Access 5: Quai de Jemmapes
- Access 6: rue de Chaumont

=== Station layout ===
| Line 2 platforms | Side platform, doors will open on the right |
| Line 2 platforms | Westbound | ← toward Porte Dauphine (Stalingrad) |
| Line 2 platforms | Eastbound | toward Nation (Colonel Fabien) → |
| Line 2 platforms | Side platform, doors will open on the right |
| 1F | Mezzanine |
Street Level
| B1 | Mezzanine |
| Line 5 platforms | Side platform, doors will open on the right |
| Line 5 platforms | Southbound | ← toward Place d'Italie (Stalingrad) |
| Line 5 platforms | Northbound | toward Bobigny–Pablo Picasso (Laumière) → |
| Line 5 platforms | Side platform, doors will open on the right |
| Line 7bis platforms | Side platform, doors will open on the right |
| Line 7bis platforms | Inbound | ← toward Louis Blanc (Terminus) |
| Line 7bis platforms | Outbound | toward Pré-Saint-Gervais (Bolivar) → |
| Line 7bis platforms | Side platform, doors will open on the right |

=== Platforms ===
The stations of consisting three lines are of a standard configuration with two platforms separated by the railway track, with the platforms for line 2 being elevated and the rest underground. Line 2 platforms are equipped with glass awnings, as are all elevated stations on the line. The steel pillars and tunnel exits incorporate stained glass windows which sit atop white and flat ceramic tiles. On the platform in the direction of Nation, part of the glass supports a stained glass work consisting of abstract patterns, dominated by the blue-white-red French flag, depicting the crowd that seized the Bastille prison on 14 July 1789, which is represented in white in the centre of the work. Created in 1989 by the visual artist Jacques-Antoine Ducatez, it is visible both from the inside and outside the station. The presence of this window in this station is explained by the proximity of the quays of Valmy and Jemappes, whom reference two decisive victories of the revolutionary wars following the overthrow of the French Monarchy. The stained glass also pays tribute to the pacifist Jean Jaurès. At the corner of the canopy and the pillars, ivies were planted in 2017 by Les Jardins de Babylone as part of the revegetation of RATP spaces.

=== Other connections ===
The station is also served by lines 26 and 48 of the RATP bus network, and at night, by lines N13, N41, N42, and N45 of the Noctilien bus network.

== Nearby ==
- Bassin de la Villette
- Rotonde de la Villette (part of the Wall of the Farmers-General, built between 1784 and 1788)

== Culture ==
This neighborhood of Paris was mentioned in the Henri-Georges Clouzot film "L'Assassin habite au 21" released in 1942. Vincent Dieutre's French Docudrama film Jaurès was released in 2012, it was named after the station.

== Gallery ==
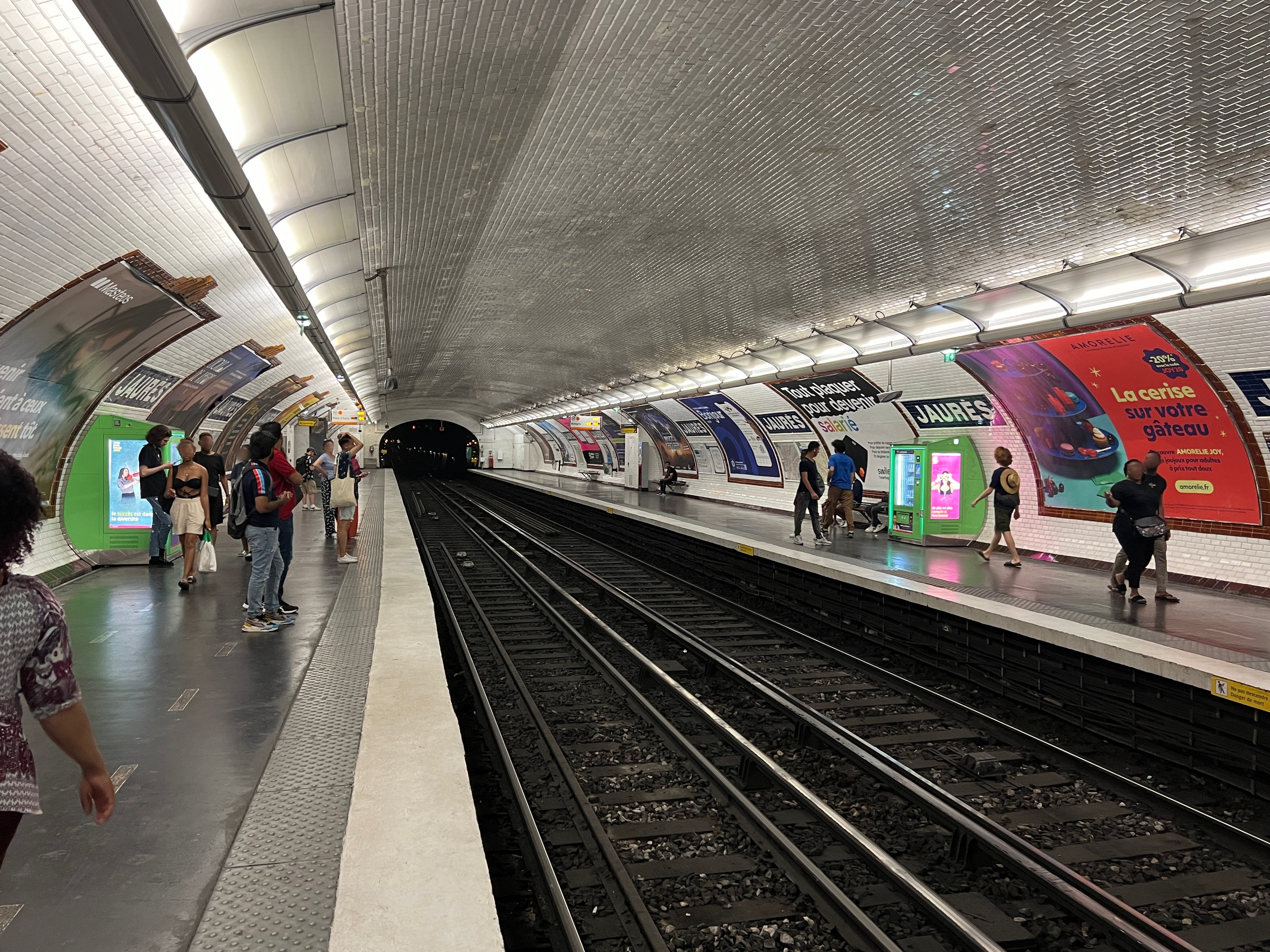
Line 5 platforms

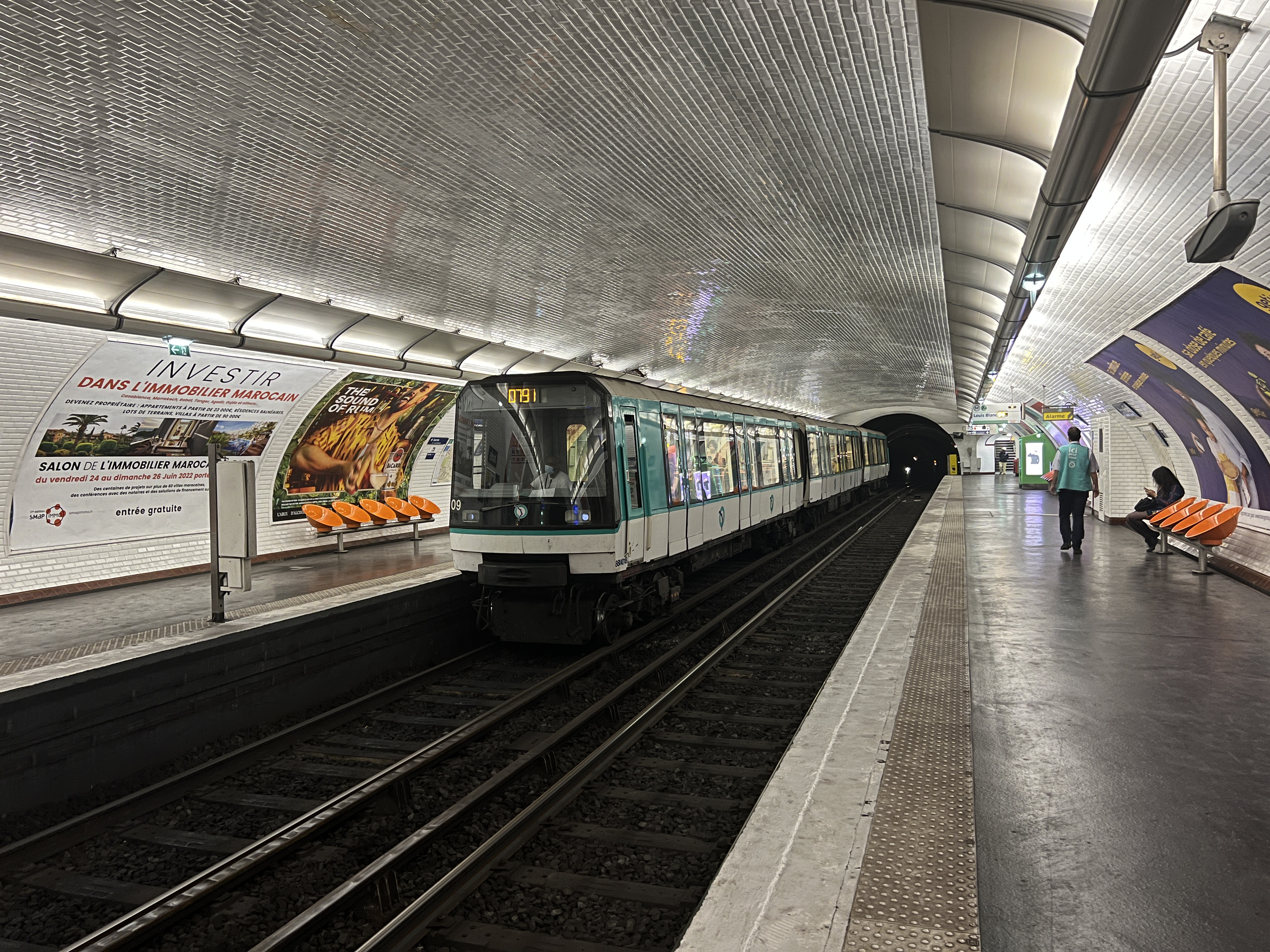
MF 88 on line 7bis

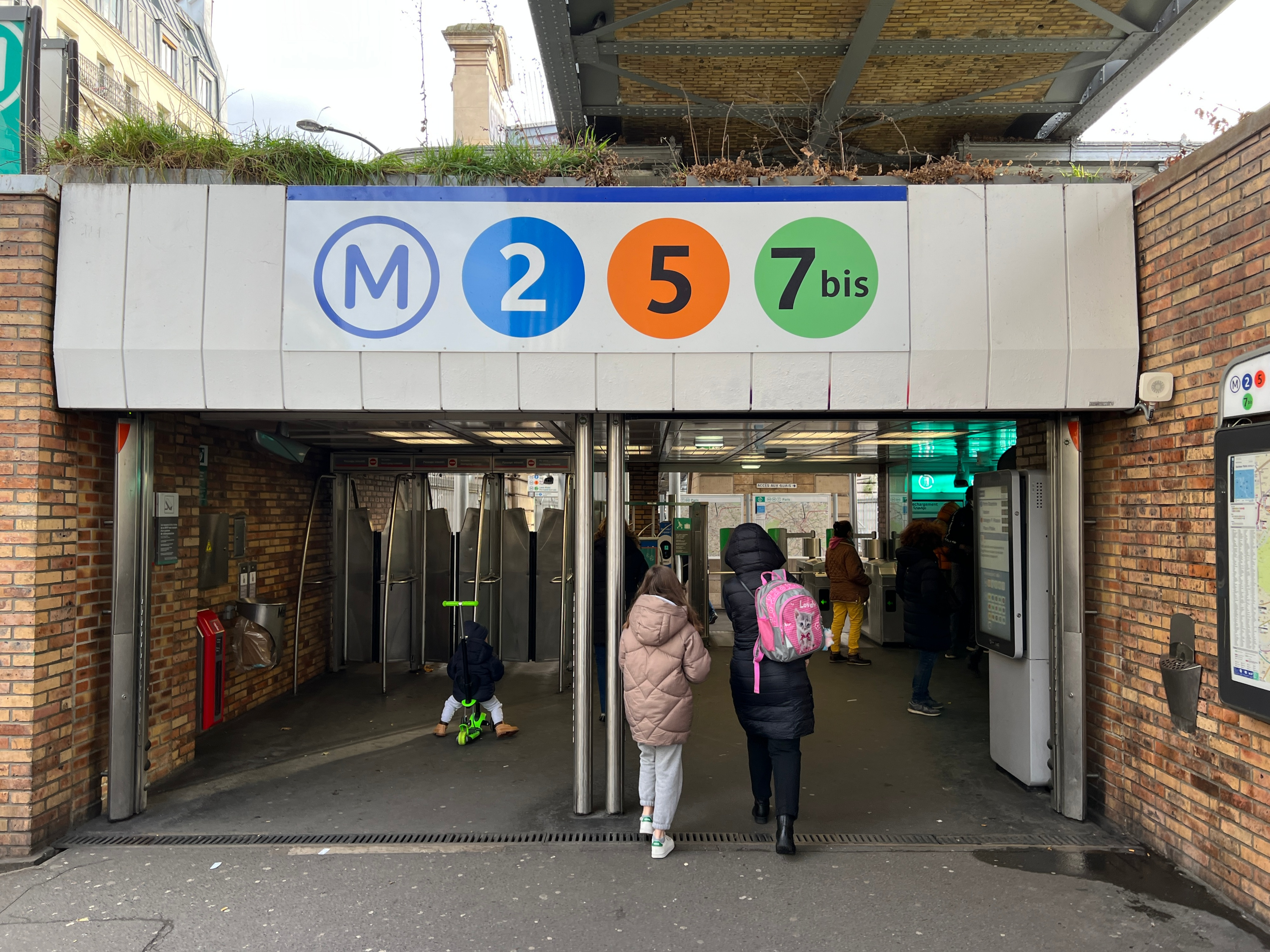
Access 1

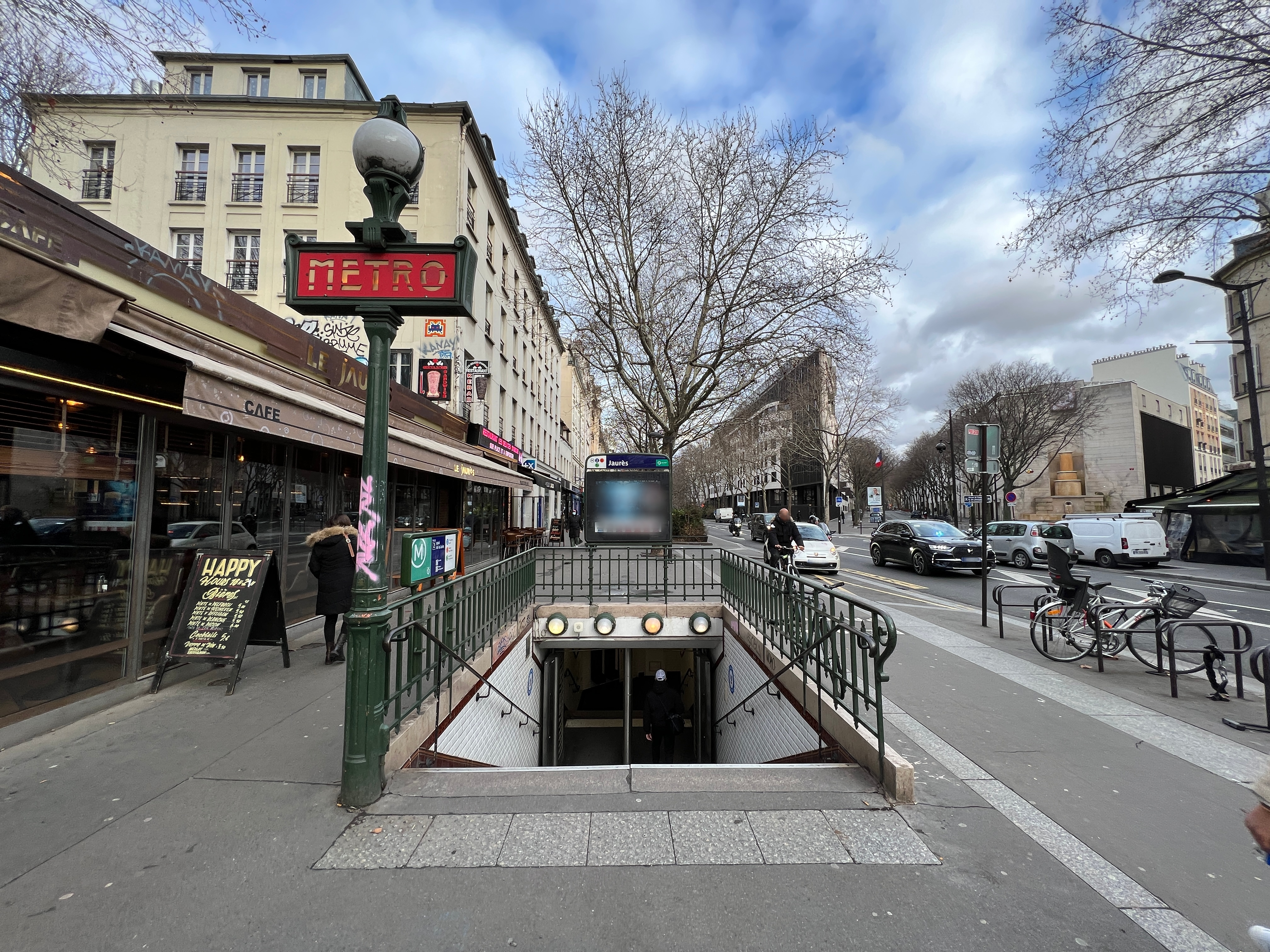
Access 2

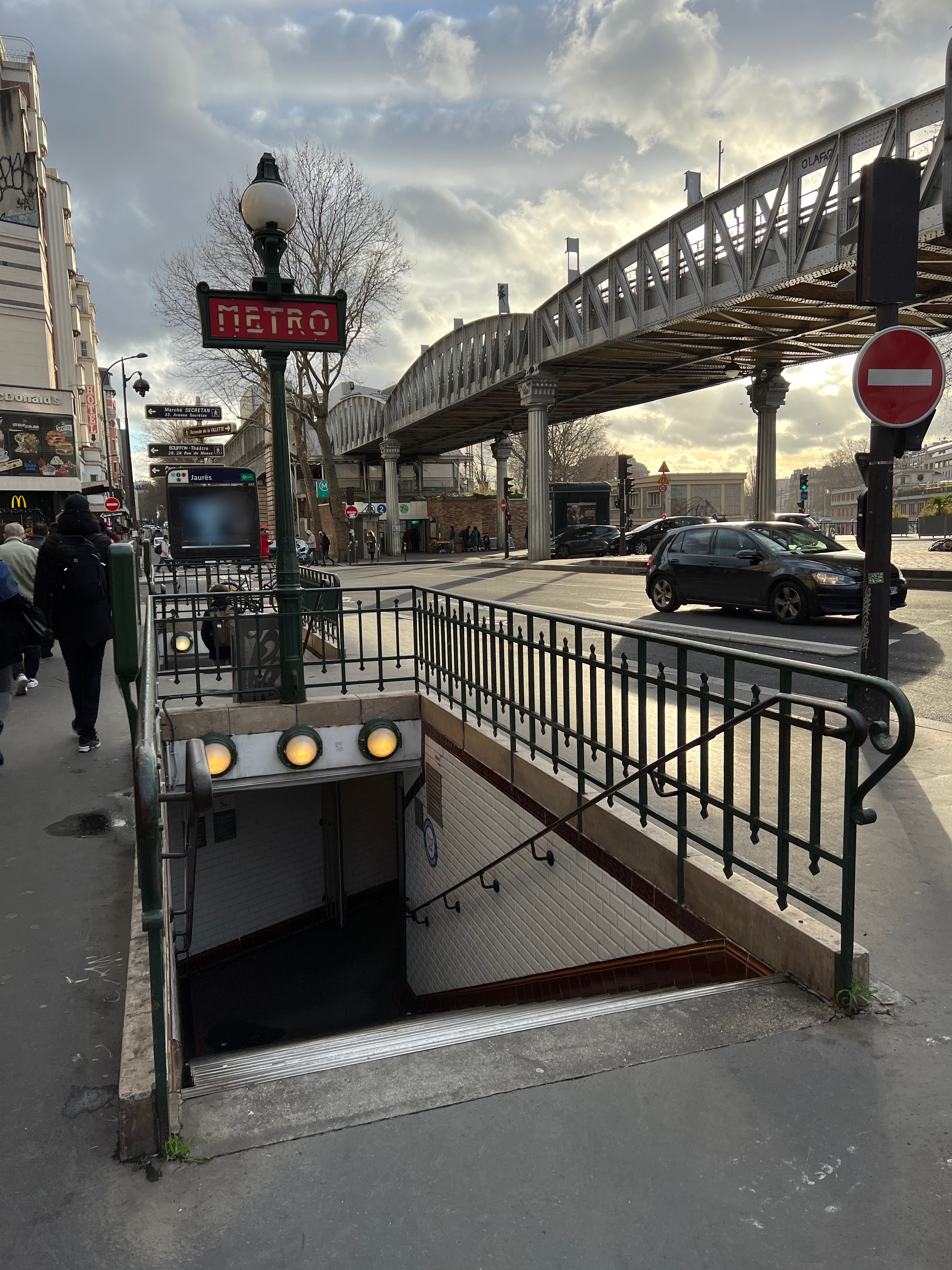
Access 3

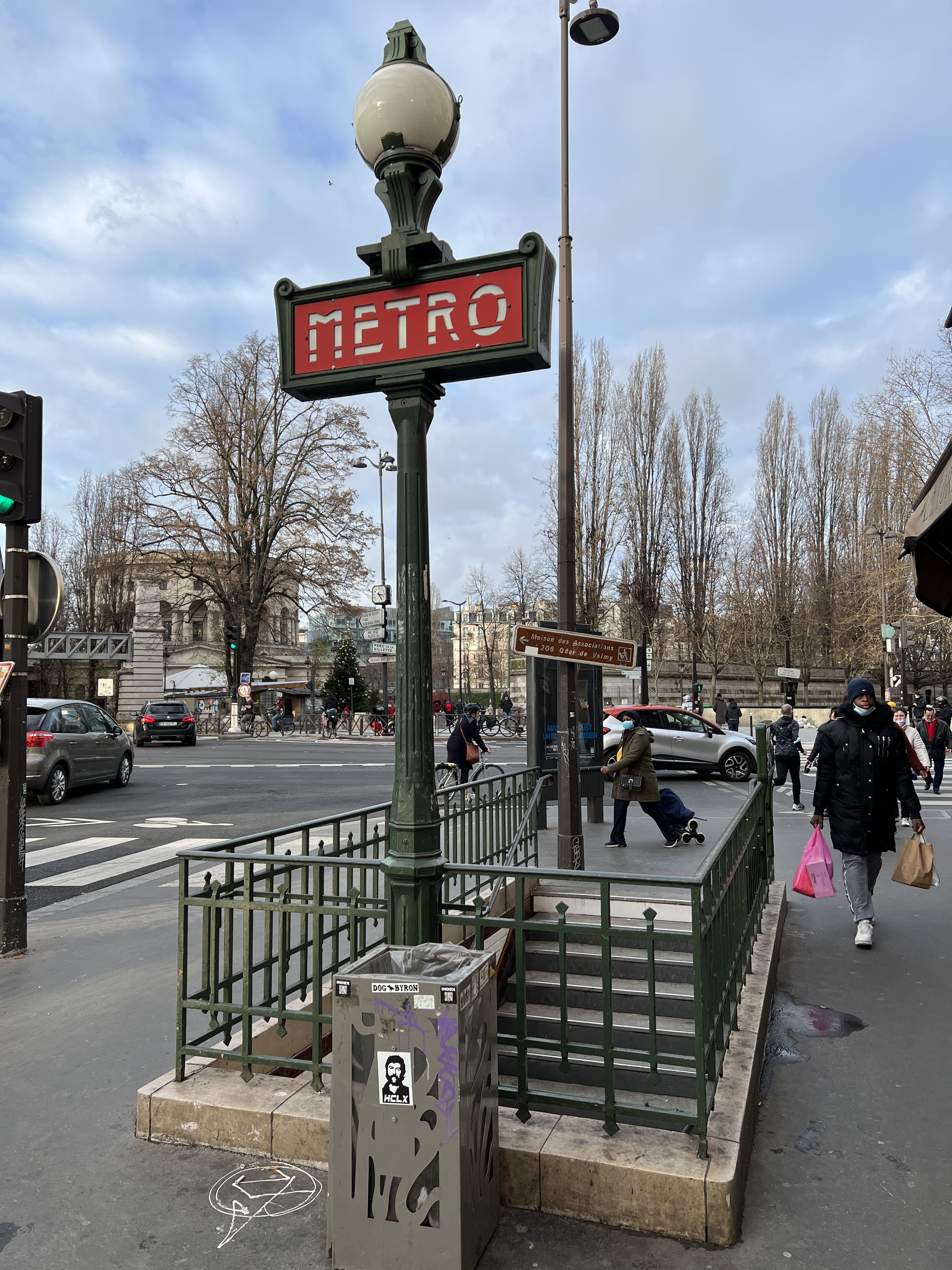
Access 4

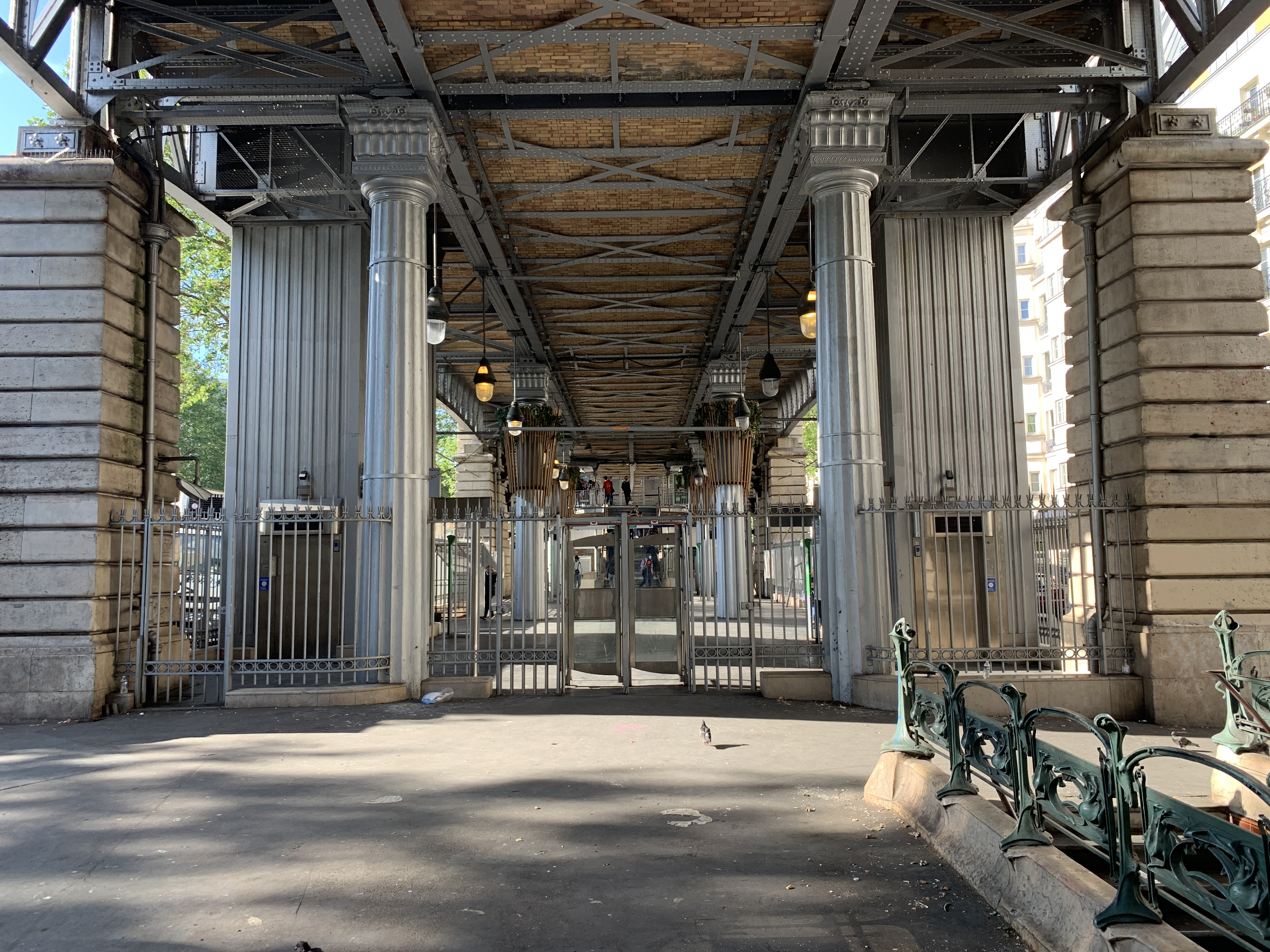
Access 5

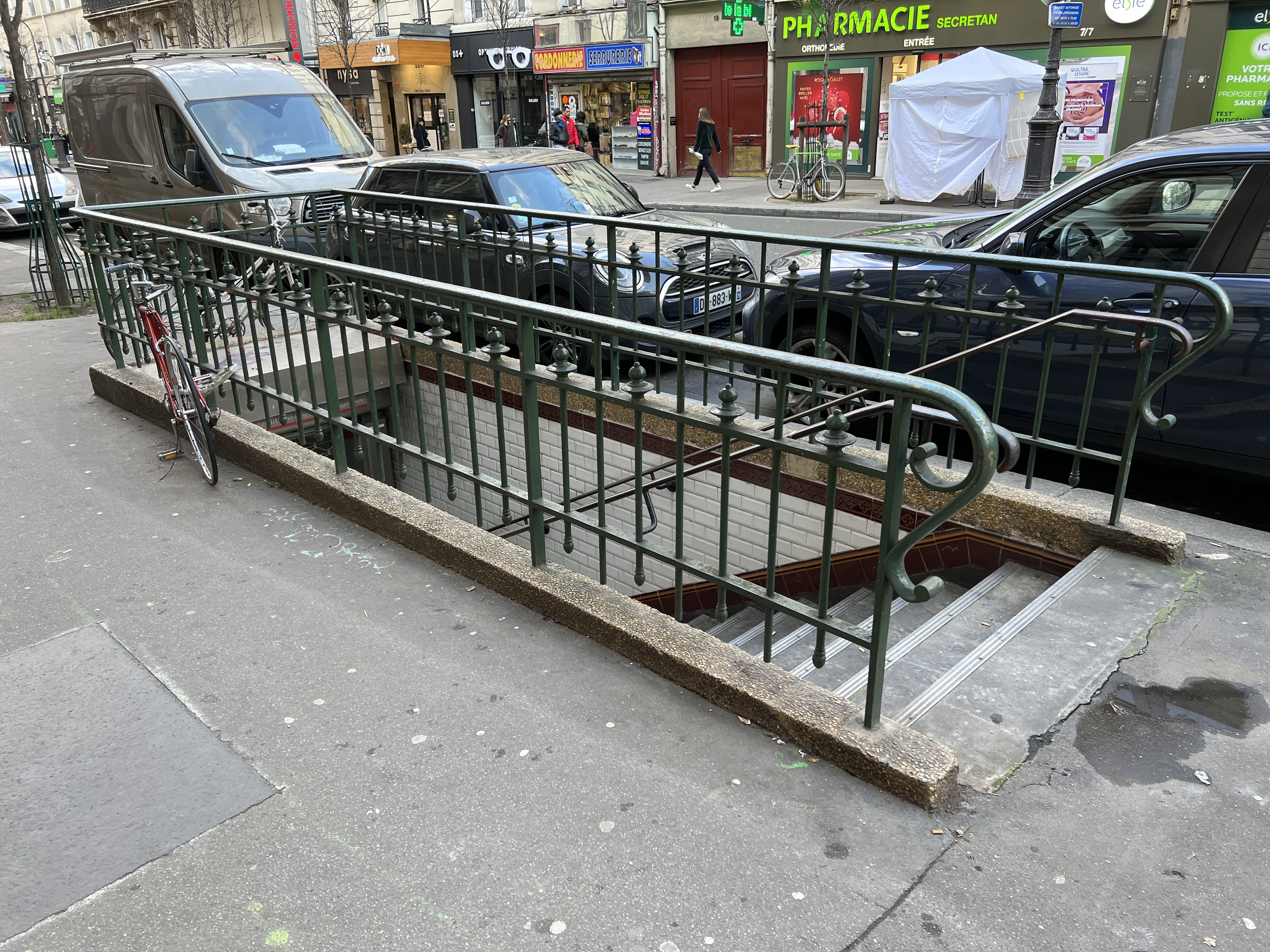
Access 6
