= Donau =

Donau may refer to:

- Danube (German: Donau), Europe's second-longest river
- Donau (horse) (1907–1913), American thoroughbred racehorse
- SS Donau, the name of several steamships
- German ship Donau (A516), a modern German replenishment ship
- RC Donau, an Austrian rugby club in Vienna
- Donau Arena, an arena in Regensburg, Germany
- Donau City, a part of Vienna, Austria
- Bernd Donau (born 1946), German footballer

== See also ==
- Danube (disambiguation)
- Dunino, Poland (German: Dohnau), a village in Gmina Krotoszyce, Lower Silesian Voivodeship
- SS-Oberabschnitt Donau, the primary division command of the Allgemeine-SS in Austria
- Donau-Ries, a district in Bavaria, Germany
- Alb-Donau-Kreis, a district in Baden-Württemberg, Germany
