= Euxine abyssal plain =

Part of the Black Sea

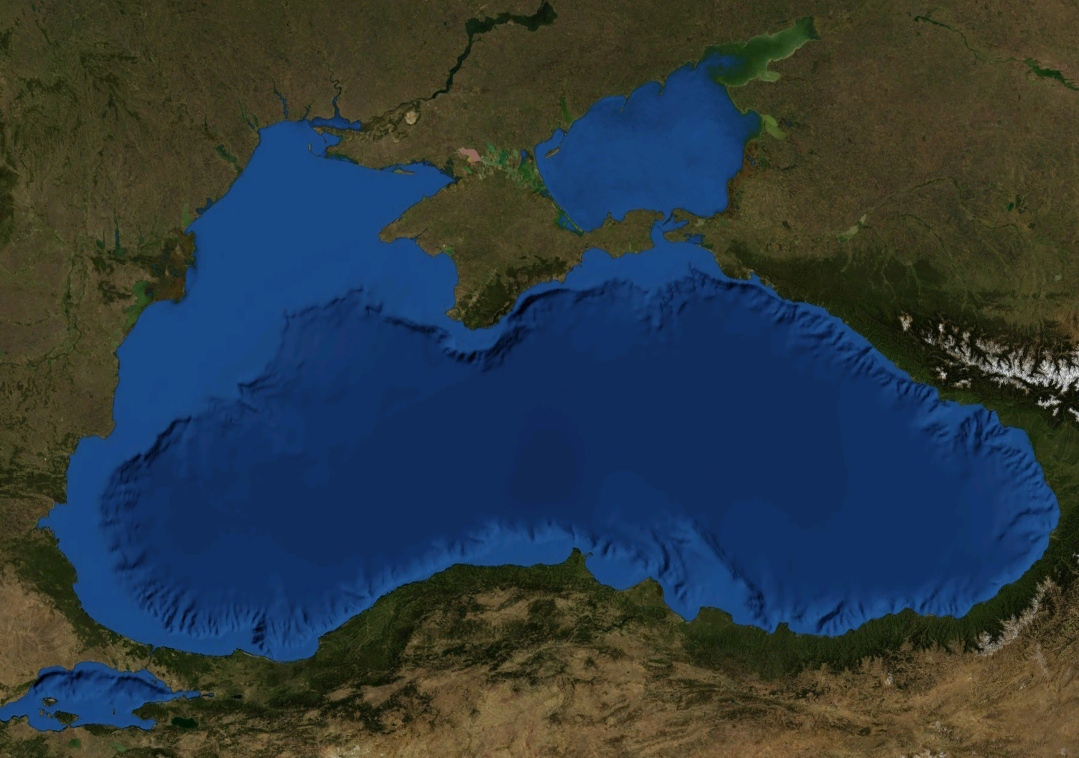
Illustration of the Black Sea, from NASA’s World Wind globe software

The Euxine abyssal plain is a physiographic province of the Black Sea, an abyssal plain in its central parts. Its name comes from the Ancient Greek name Euxeinos Pontos (Εὔξεινος Πόντος) of the Black Sea. The principal escarpments leading down to the plain are the Crimean Escarpment in the north, the Caucasus Escarpment in the northeast, the Canik (or East Pontic) Escarpment in the southeast, and the Küre (or West Pontic) Escarpment in the southwest.

It represents 12.2% of the Black Sea area with a very gentle gradient of 1:1,000. A small part of the abyssal plain is split off by the Danubian fan, a relict alluvial fan of sediment.

Its depth ranges between 2,000 and 2,200 m, with a maximum depth of 2,212 m south of Yalta on the Crimean Peninsula.
