= Danube fan =

Geologic feature of the Black Sea

The Danube fan is a relict sedimentary feature in the northwestern part of the bottom of the Black Sea. It crosses three of its four major physiographic provinces: basin slope, basin apron, and the Euxine abyssal plain) and splits the abyssal plain into two inequal parts.

The fan was deposited by the Danube (mostly), Dniester, Southern Bug, and Dnieper rivers. It extends from the shelf break zone an approximately 200m isobath for about 150 km downslope and reaches the depth of about 2,200 m within the abyssal plain.

The fan is a relict from Pleistocene times when the sea level was lower, and at present, little fluvial sediment is being added to the fan; most of material is deposited in the river estuaries.

The Danube sediment supply is via the Danube Canyon (also called Viteaz Canyon).
