= Danube station (Paris Metro) =

Metro station in Paris, France

Danube
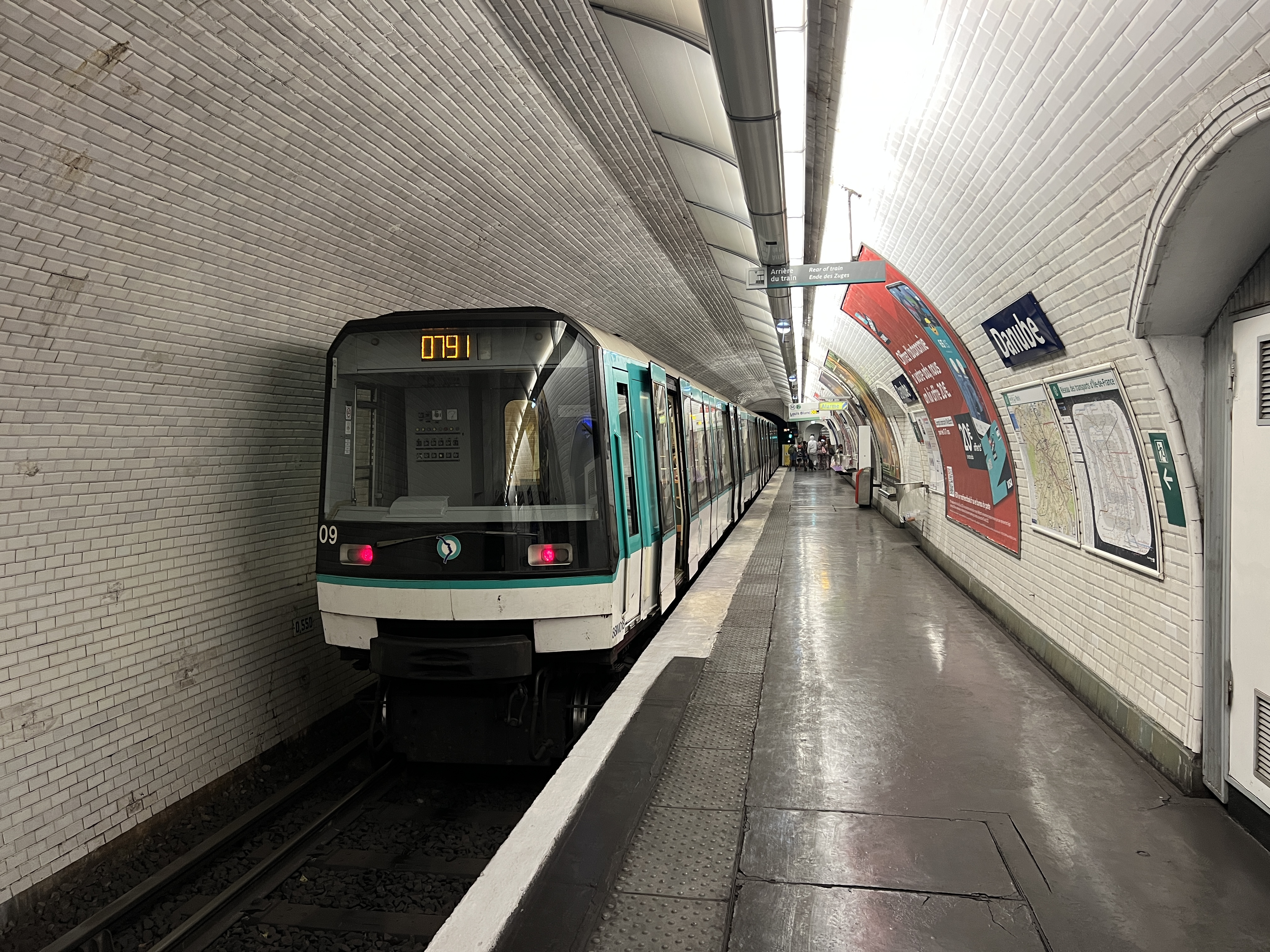

General information
- Location: 19th arrondissement of Paris; Île-de-France; France
- Coordinates: 48°52′55″N 2°23′39″E
- System: Paris Metro station
- Owner: RATP
- Operator: RATP
- Line: Paris Metro Paris Metro Line 7bis
- Platforms: 1 island platform
- Tracks: 2 (only 1 in use)

Other information
- Station code: 23-10
- Fare zone: 1

History
- Opened: 18 January 1911

Passengers
- 266,623 (2020)

Services
| Preceding station | Paris Metro | Following station |
|---|---|---|
| Botzaris towards Louis Blanc | Line 7bis Loop westbound only | Pré-Saint-Gervais One-way operation |
One-way operation: trains arrive from Pré-Saint-Gervais and depart to Botzaris
Location
- Location within Paris

Danube (French pronunciation: [danyb]) is a station of the Paris Metro serving Line 7bis (westbound only). It is named after Place de Danube, which was renamed Place Rhin-et-Danube in 1951 to commemorate the 1st French Army which had during the Italian campaign between 1943 and 1945 distinguished itself during the landing of Provence, then fought on the Rhine and Danube rivers in World War II.

== History ==
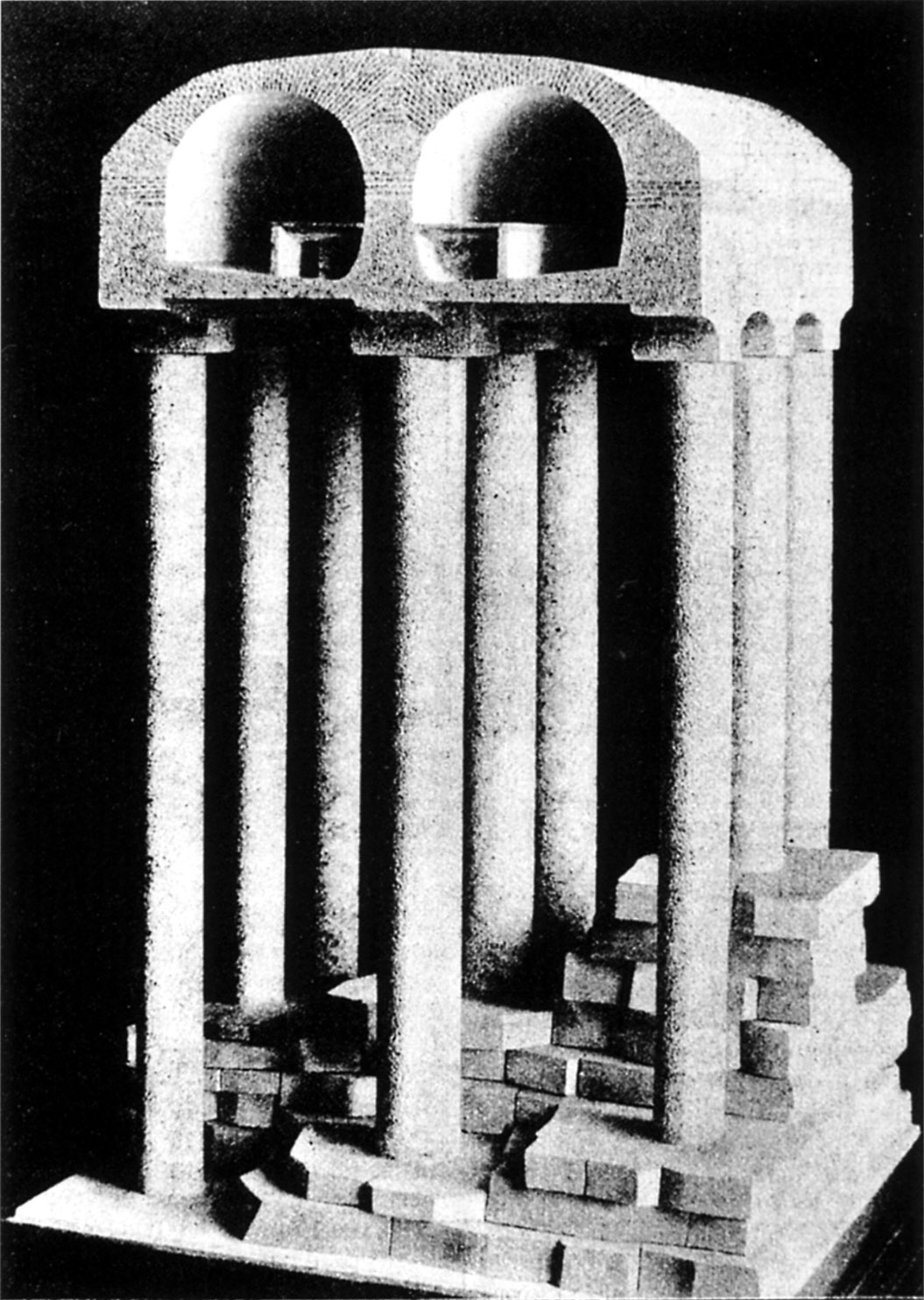
Structure of the station. It is not established as an underground viaduct, as the model might suggest

The station opened on 18 January 1911 as part of a branch of line 7 from Louis Blanc to Pré-Saint-Gervais, 18 days after the commissioning of the first section of line 7 between Opéra and Porte de la Villette due to difficulties during its construction.

As the station is constructed in unstable terrain, located in a former mine where gypsum was extracted for export to the United States, the station box was strengthened by having separate vaults for each track, with a single shared island platform. The station box is perched more than 30 m above solid ground, with its 220 supporting columns, each 2.5 m in diameter, have a cumulative height of 5,500 m. These foundations were necessary due to the inconsistency of the ground which consisted of the former mines that had been backfilled. On 3 December 1967 this branch was separated from line 7, becoming line 7bis.

Initially during the planning phase, it was envisioned that it will serve as the terminus, but was then moved to Place des Fêtes before finally deciding to create a one-way loop between these two stations with Pré-Saint-Gervais acting as the branch's commercial terminus.

As part of the Un métro + beau programme by the RATP, the station was renovated and modernised on 18 December 2007.

In 2019, the station was used by 547,896 passengers, making it the 297th busiest of the Metro network out of 302 stations.

In 2020, the station was used by 266,623 passengers amidst the COVID-19 pandemic, making it the 297th busiest of the Metro network out of 305 stations.

== Passenger services ==
=== Access ===
The station has a single entrance at Place Rhin-et-Danube.

=== Station layout ===
| G | Street Level |
| B1 | Mezzanine |
| B2 | Inbound | Not in regular use |
| B2 | Island platform, doors will open on the right |
| B2 | Inbound | ← toward Louis Blanc (Botzaris) (No service outbound: Pré-Saint-Gervais) |

=== Platforms ===
The station consists of 2 parallel half-stations linked by perpendicular cross passages with a single island platform flanked by 2 tracks. Only the southern platform is in regular use.

=== Other connections ===
The station is also served by line 75 of the RATP bus network.

== Gallery ==
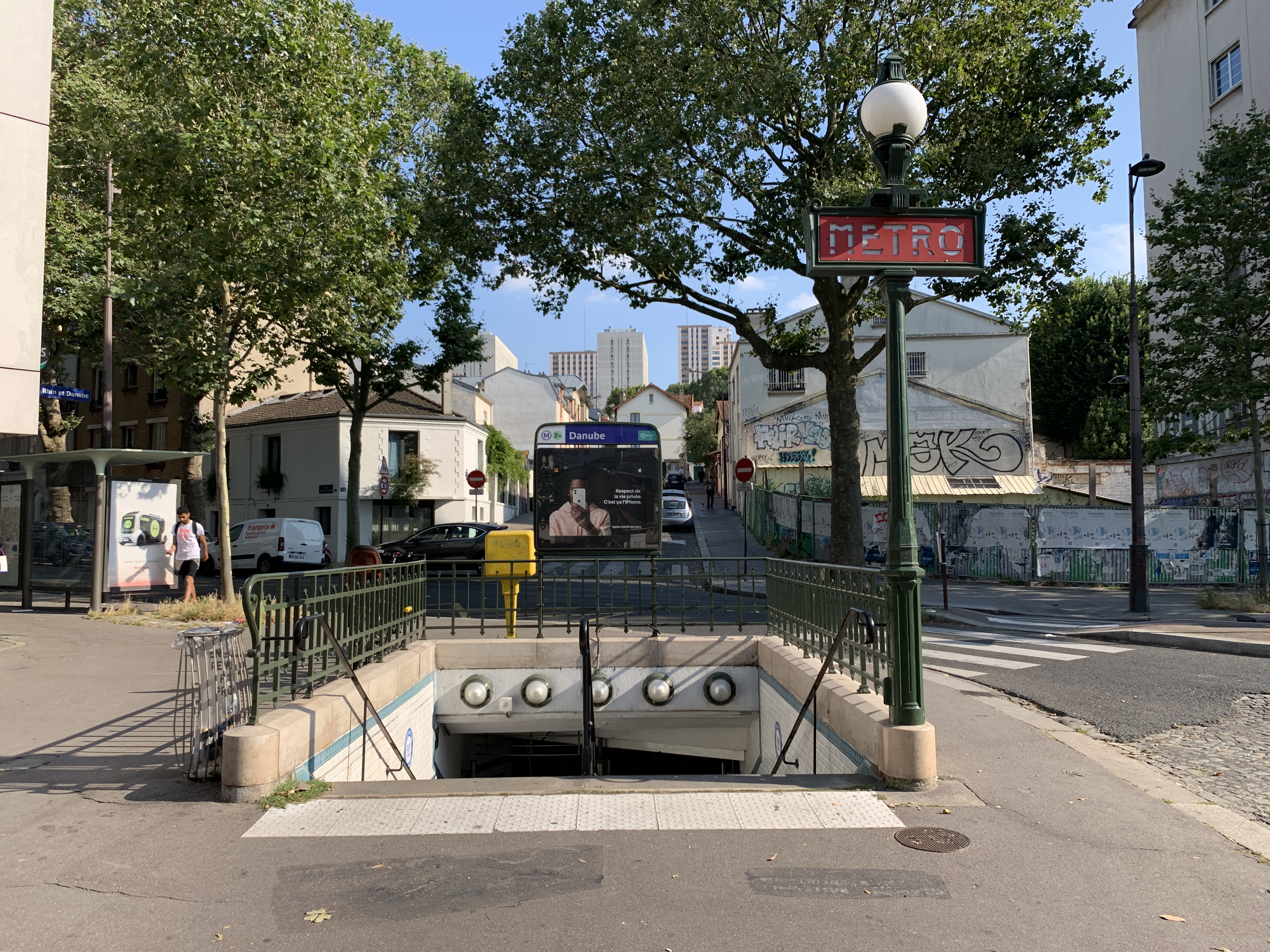
Entrance at Place Rhin-et-Danube

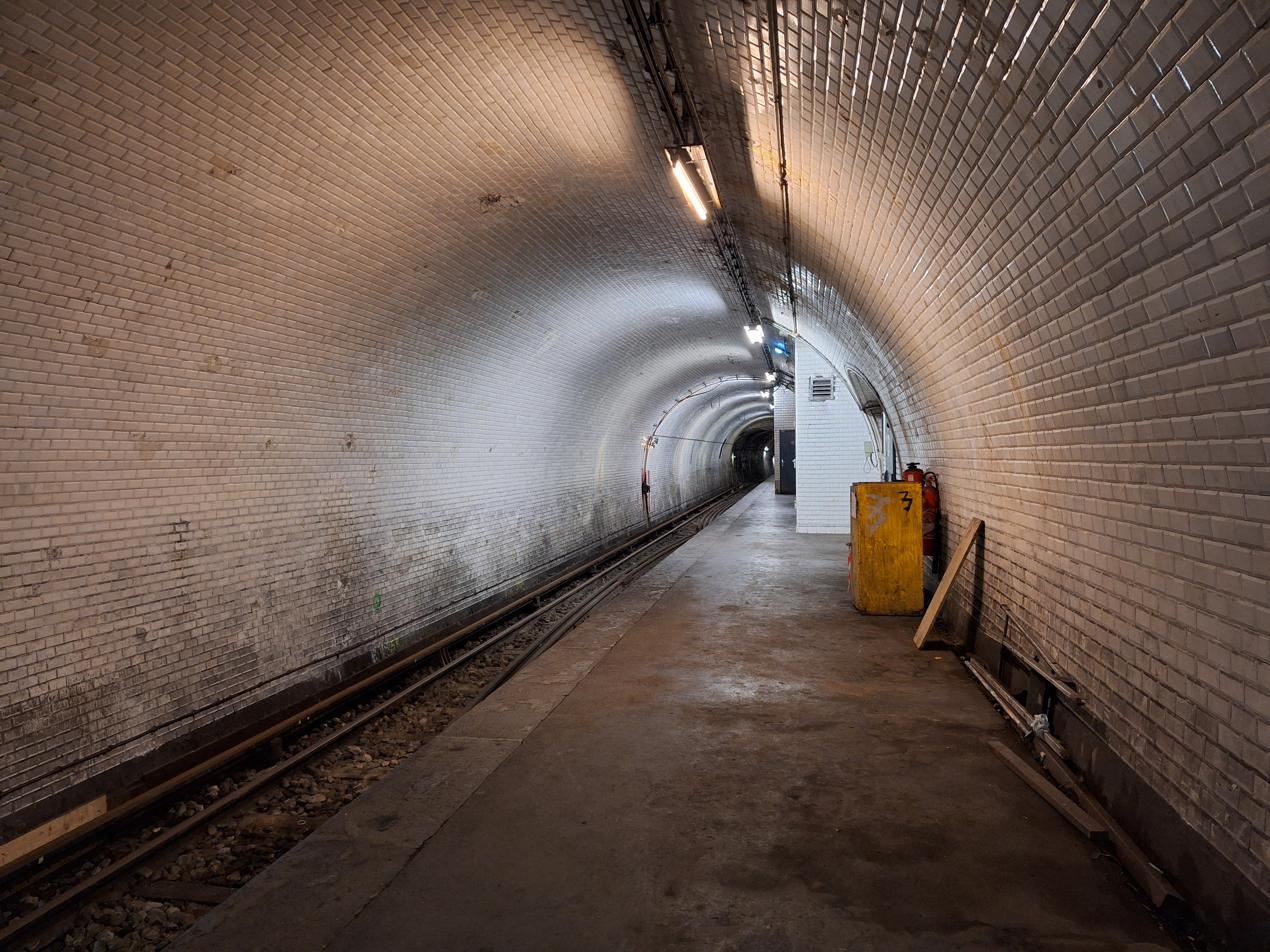
The unused platform of the station, limited for train maintenance

== See also ==
- Danube (Dubai Metro)
