= Danube Canyon =

Submarine canyon in the Black Sea

Coordinates: 43.97°N 30.38°E

Location in the Black Sea

The Danube Canyon (also known as the Viteaz Canyon) is a large submarine canyon, off the coast of Romania, which indents the shelf in the northwestern part of the Black Sea. It developed seawards during the late Pleistocene seaward along the Danube valley.

The canyon continues into the most recent central channel in the relict Danube fan at the bottom of the Black Sea and has been the major route of the transport of the deposit from Danube river to the Danube fan.

Near the shelf break zone the canyon is approximately 350m deep.
