= Louis Blanc station =

Metro station in Paris, France

Louis Blanc
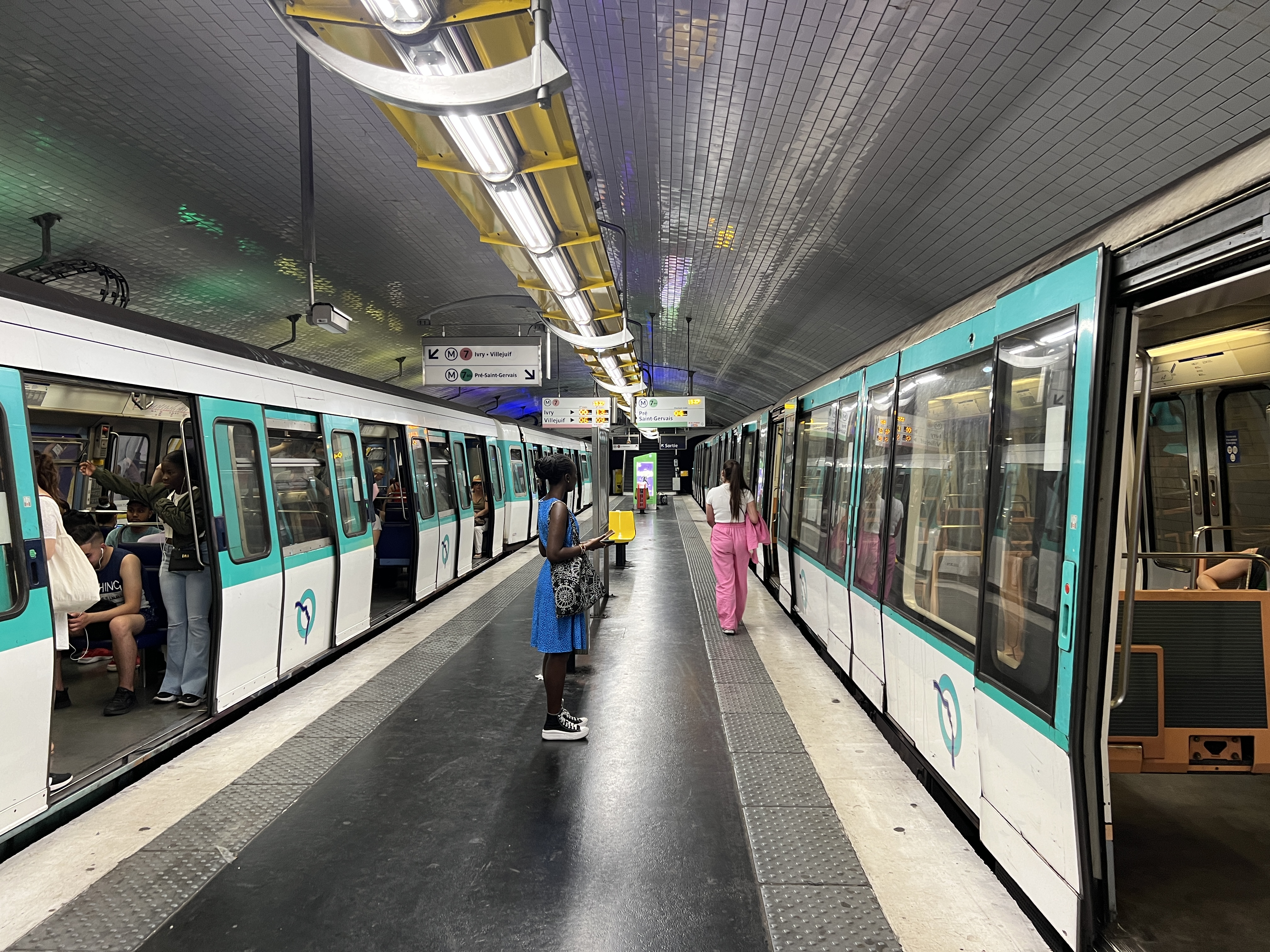
- MF 77 on left (Line 7), MF 88 on right (Line 7bis)

General information
- Location: 10th arrondissement of Paris; Île-de-France; France
- Coordinates: 48°52′52″N 2°21′53″E
- System: Paris Metro station
- Owner: RATP
- Operator: RATP
- Line: Paris Metro Paris Metro Line 7 Paris Metro Line 7bis
- Platforms: 4 (2 island platforms, 2 side platforms)
- Tracks: 4

Other information
- Station code: 22-10
- Fare zone: 1

History
- Opened: 23 November 1910; 115 years ago

Passengers
- 1,226,441 (2020)

Services
Preceding station	Paris Metro	Following station
Château-Landon towards Villejuif–Louis Aragon or Mairie d'Ivry	Line 7	Stalingrad towards La Courneuve–8 mai 1945
Terminus	Line 7bis	Jaurès towards Pré-Saint-Gervais
Location
- Location within Paris

Louis Blanc (French pronunciation: [lwi blɑ̃]) is a Paris Metro station on line 7 and 7bis (serving as the western terminus of Line 7bis). The station is named after rue Louis Blanc, which honours Louis Blanc (1811–1882), who published political works, which led to the foundation of the French Socialist Party. He was a member of the Provisional Government of 1848 and had exiled himself to London during the Second Empire from 1848 to 1870. He was then elected to the French National Assembly in 1870.

The station has two island platforms and two side platforms, a layout rarely found elsewhere in the Metro.

== History ==
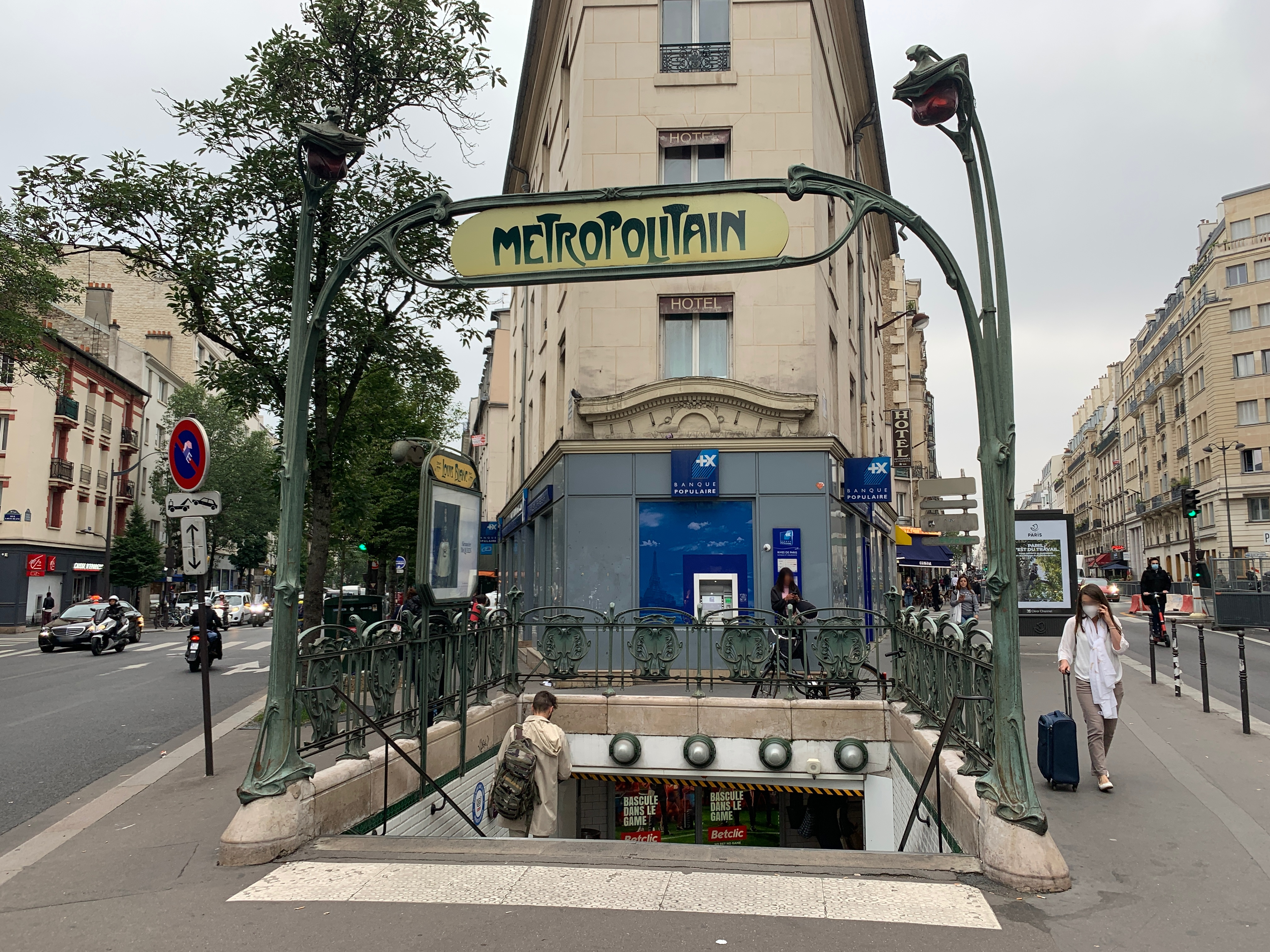

Louis Blanc opened on 23 November 1910, 18 days after the commissioning of the first section of line 7 between Opéra and Porte de la Villette with the branch from Louis Blanc to Pré-Saint-Gervais only opening on 18 January 1911 due to difficulties during its construction. On 3 December 1967 the branch to Pré Saint-Gervais was separated as 7bis, terminating at this station, with Louis Blanc becoming its western terminus as a result of an imbalance in traffic between the two branches – the branch to Porte de la Villette having significantly higher traffic due to its role as an important terminus for many suburban buses. This enabled a higher frequency of trains services that could run on the branch to Porte de la Villette than before where 1 of every 2 trains went to each branch.

As part of the Un métro + beau programme by the RATP, the station was renovated and modernised on 11 July 2014.

In 2019, the station was used by 2,272,326 passengers, making it the 228th busiest of the Metro network out of 302 stations. In 2020, the station was used by 1,226,441 passengers amidst the COVID-19 pandemic, making it the 209th busiest of the Metro network, out of 305 stations.

== Passenger services ==
=== Access ===
Louis Blanc has a single entrance with a Guimard kiosk, registered as a historical monument since 29 May 1978, at the intersection of Rue La Fayette and Rue du Faubourg-Saint-Martin.

=== Station layout ===
G	Street Level	Exit/Entrance
B1	Mezzanine
Southbound/ Eastbound Platforms	Side platform, doors will open on the right
Southbound/ Eastbound Platforms	Platform 1	← toward Villejuif–Louis Aragon or Mairie d'Ivry (Château-Landon)
Southbound/ Eastbound Platforms	Island platform, doors will open on the left for Line 7 trains, right for Line 7bis trains
Southbound/ Eastbound Platforms	Platform 1	toward Pré-Saint-Gervais (Jaurès) →
Northbound Platforms	Platform 2	toward La Courneuve–8 mai 1945 (Stalingrad) →
Northbound Platforms	Island platform, doors will open on the right
Northbound Platforms	Platform 2	No regular service
Northbound Platforms	Side platform, not in service

- Note: The northbound and southbound platforms run under different streets that intersect at the station's northern end.

=== Platforms ===
Louis Blanc consists of two underground stations built on different levels. The shallowest is nicknamed the upper station, the other the lower station. They have the same particular configuration with a side platform, described as "dead" because of its non-use, and an island platform bordered on both sides by the subway tracks. One of the two tracks is therefore framed by the two platforms, while the other runs along the right wall. The upper station is served, from the central track, by the trains of line 7 running to Mairie d'Ivry or Villejuif – Louis Aragon and, from the side track, by the trains of line 7 bis from or to Pré-Saint-Gervais, of which it previously provided only arrivals. The lower station is served, from the side track, by the trains of line 7 to La Courneuve, while its central track, previously ensuring the departure of trains of line 7bis towards Pré-Saint-Gervais, is no longer used in normal service.

Both stations are decorated in the Ouï-dire style, yellow for the upper station and in green for the lower station. Thus, the lighting canopies are supported by curved hangers in the form of a scythe are yellow and green respectively. The direct lighting is white while the indirect lighting, projected on the vault, is multi-coloured. The white ceramic tiles are flat and cover the right wall, vault and tunnel exits, but the technical room at the western end of the upper station is treated with classic bevelled white tiles. The advertising frames are yellow or green (matching the lighting banners) and cylindrical, while the name of the station is inscribed on enamelled plates with the Parisine font for the upper station, and in capital letters as in Parisine typography for the lower station. The Motte style seats are yellow in the upper station and grey in the lower station.

=== Other connections ===
The station is also served by lines 26, 46, and 54 of the RATP bus network, and at night, by lines N13, N41, N42, and N45 of the Noctilien bus network.

== Gallery ==
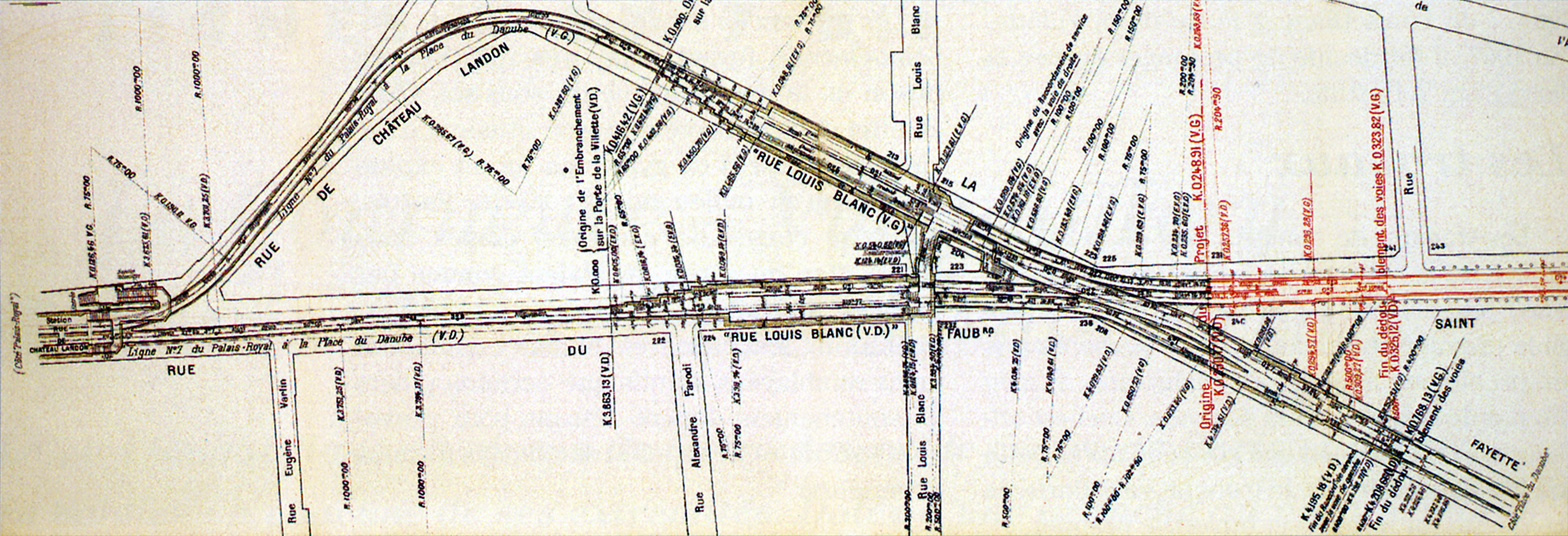
Plan of Louis Blanc station c.1905

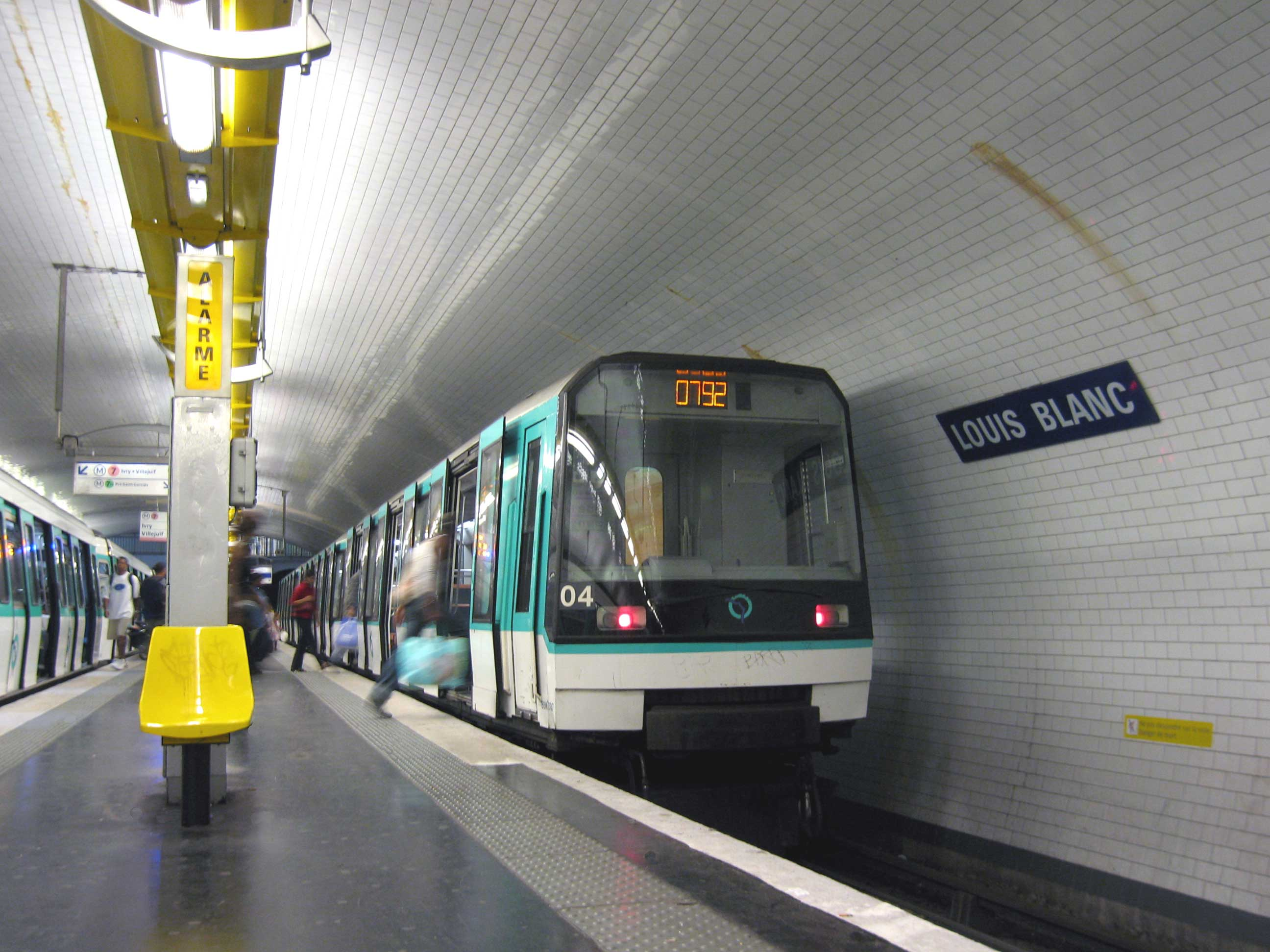
MF 88 on line 7bis to the right of an MF 77 train on line 7

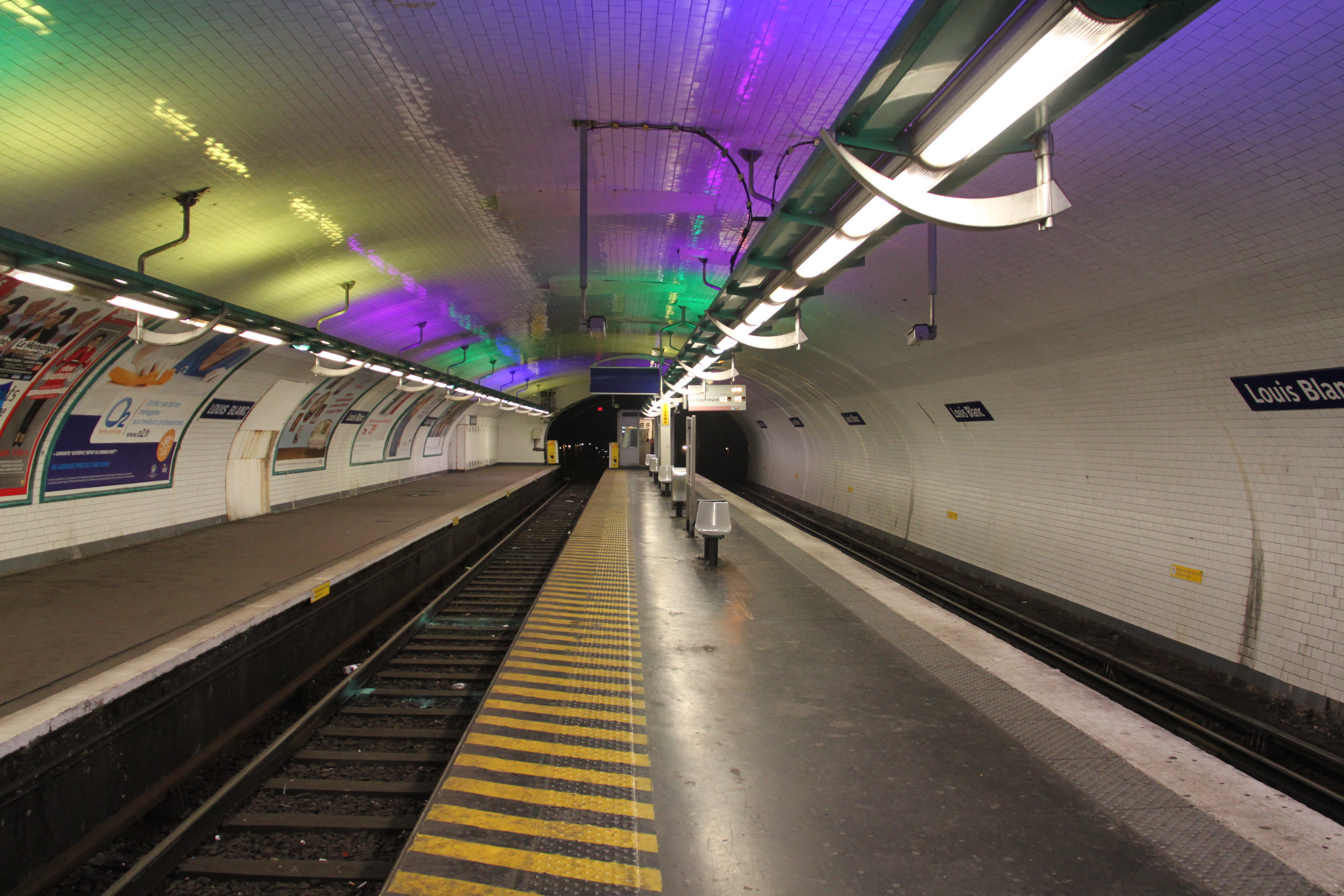
Line 7 platform towards La Courneuve (right). The side platform is not in use.

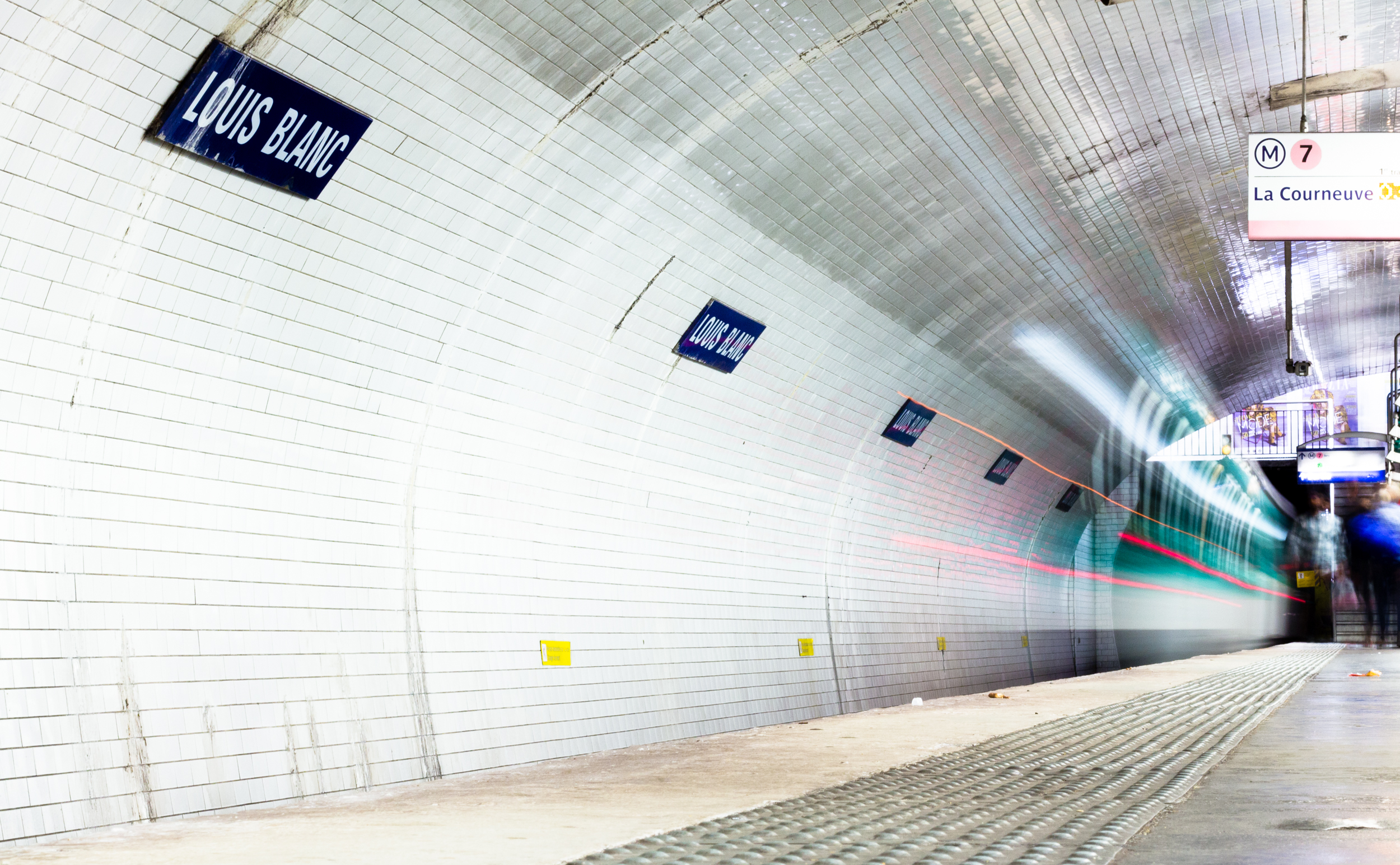
View of the station in 2014
