= Pré-Saint-Gervais station =

Metro station in Paris, France

Pré-Saint-Gervais
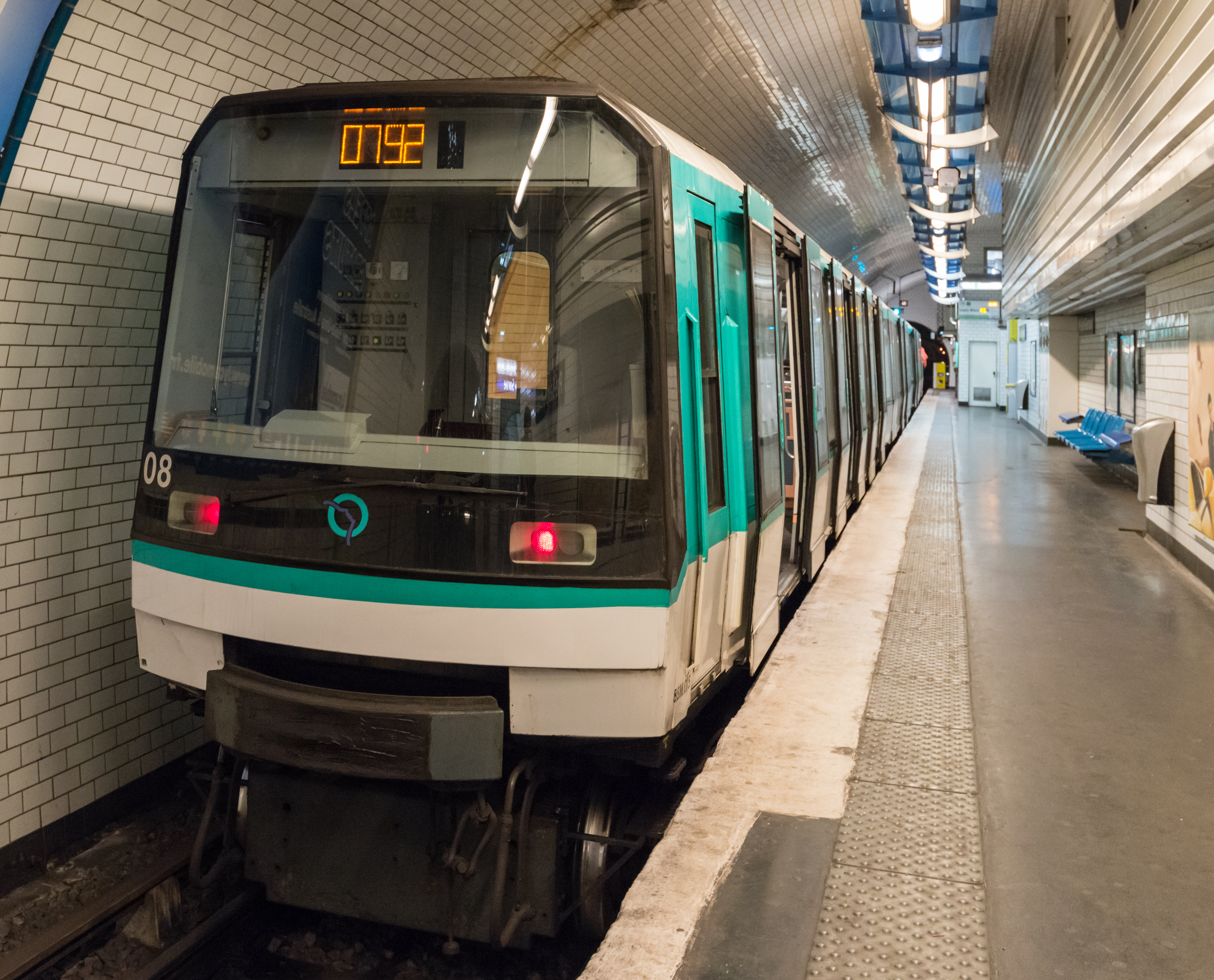
- MF 88 at Pré-Saint-Gervais

General information
- Location: 19th arrondissement of Paris; Île-de-France; France
- Coordinates: 48°52′49″N 2°23′56″E
- System: Paris Metro station
- Owner: RATP
- Operator: RATP
- Line: Paris Metro Paris Metro Line 7bis
- Platforms: 1 (island platform)
- Tracks: 2

Other information
- Station code: 23-11
- Fare zone: 1

History
- Opened: 18 January 1911

Passengers
- 226,935 (2020)

Services
| Preceding station | Paris Metro | Following station |
|---|---|---|
| Place des Fêtes One-way operation | Line 7bis Loop terminus | Danube towards Louis Blanc |
One-way operation: trains arrive from Place des Fêtes and depart to Danube
| Preceding station | Tram | Following station |
| Butte du Chapeau Rouge towards Porte Dauphine | T3b | Porte des Lilas towards Porte de Vincennes |
Location
- Location within Paris

Pré-Saint-Gervais (French pronunciation: [pʁe sɛ̃ ʒɛʁvɛ]) is a station of the Paris Metro, serving as the eastern terminus (actually the far end of the terminal loop) of Line 7bis, in the 19th arrondissement. It is named after the district of Pré-Saint-Gervais, which was part of the commune of Le Pré-Saint-Gervais before it was absorbed into Paris in 1860. Le Pré-Saint-Gervais is named after a chapel dedicated to Saint Gervasius.

== History ==
The station opened on 18 January 1911 as part of a branch of Line 7 from Louis Blanc to Pré-Saint-Gervais, 18 days after the commissioning of the first section of Line 7 between Opéra and Porte de la Villette due to difficulties during its construction. It then served as the terminus of the two northeastern branches of Line 7. From 27 November 1921 to 2 September 1939, a shuttle service operated between the station and the former Porte des Lilas - Cinéma via a tunnel called voie navette. On 3 December 1967 this branch was separated from Line 7, becoming Line 7bis. It serves as the commercial terminus of Line 7bis and trains may stop for an extended period of time as breaks for drivers as well as for timetabling reasons.

As part of the Un métro + beau programme by the RATP, the station was renovated and modernised on 2 May 2006.

In 2019, the station was used by 365,930 passengers, making it the 301st busiest of the Métro network out of 302 stations.

In 2020, the station was used by 226,935 passengers amidst the COVID-19 pandemic, making it the 300th busiest of the Métro network out of 305 stations.

== Passenger services ==
=== Access ===
The station has a single exit at boulevard Sérurie and is adorned with a Guimard entrance. It was listed as a historical monument on 12 February 2016.

=== Station layout ===
| G | Street Level |
| B1 | Mezzanine |
| B2 | Inbound | Not in regular use |
| B2 | Island platform, doors will open on the right |
| B2 | Inbound | ← toward Louis Blanc (Danube) (No service from westbound: Pré-Saint-Gervais) (No service from eastbound: Porte des Lilas) |

=== Platforms ===
The station has a single island platform flanked by 2 tracks with only the southern platform in commercial use. The northern platform, however, is largely isolated behind technical rooms and is used to store trains as well as to serve as a maintenance workshop.

=== Other connections ===
The station is also served by tramway 3b at the nearby Hôpital Robert-Debré since 15 December 2012 along with Line 48 and the P’tit Bus of the RATP bus network.

== Nearby ==
- Hôpital Robert-Debré
- Parc de la Butte-du-Chapeau-Rouge

== Gallery ==
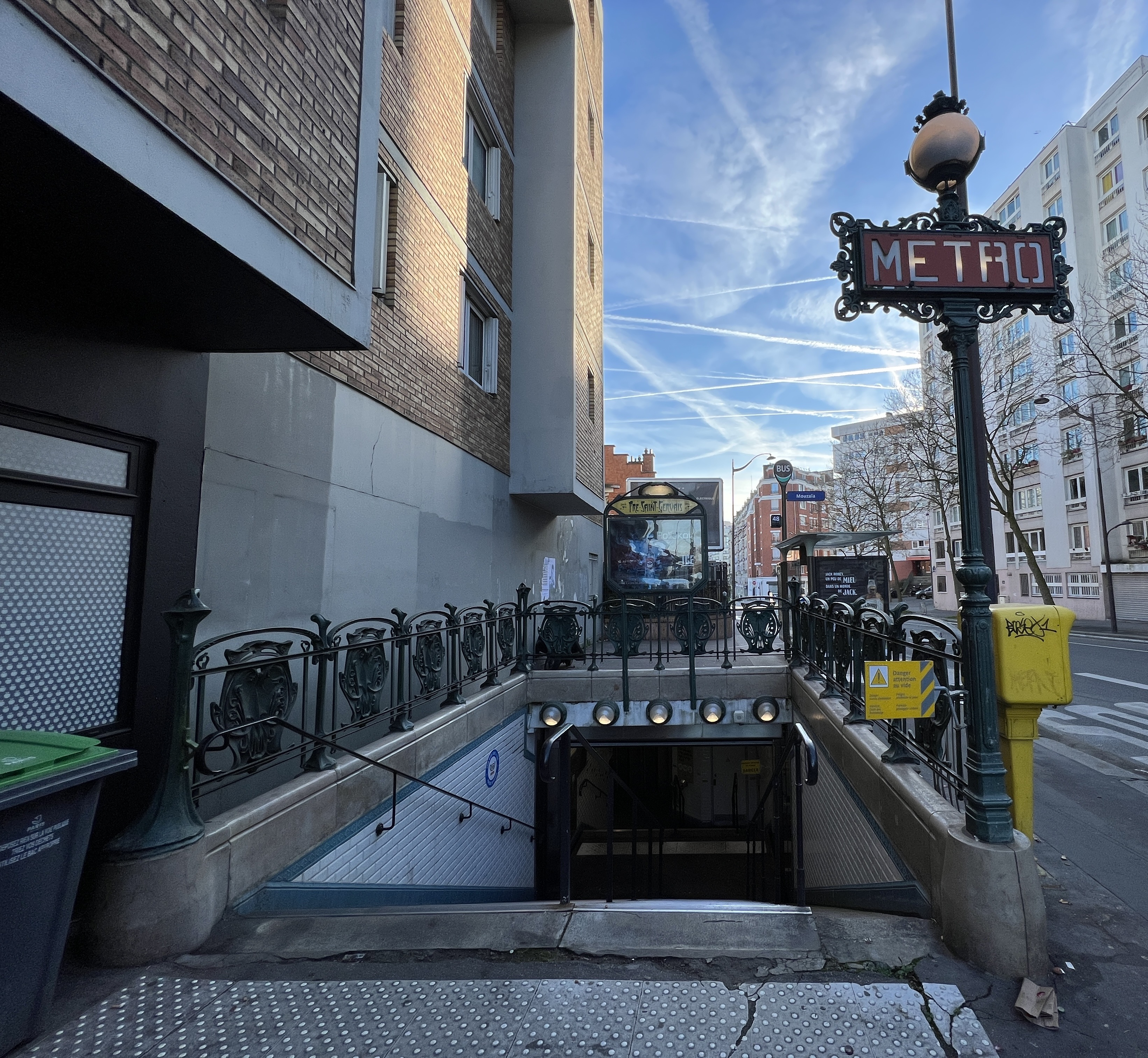
Guimard entrance at Pré-Saint-Gervais along boulevard Sérurier

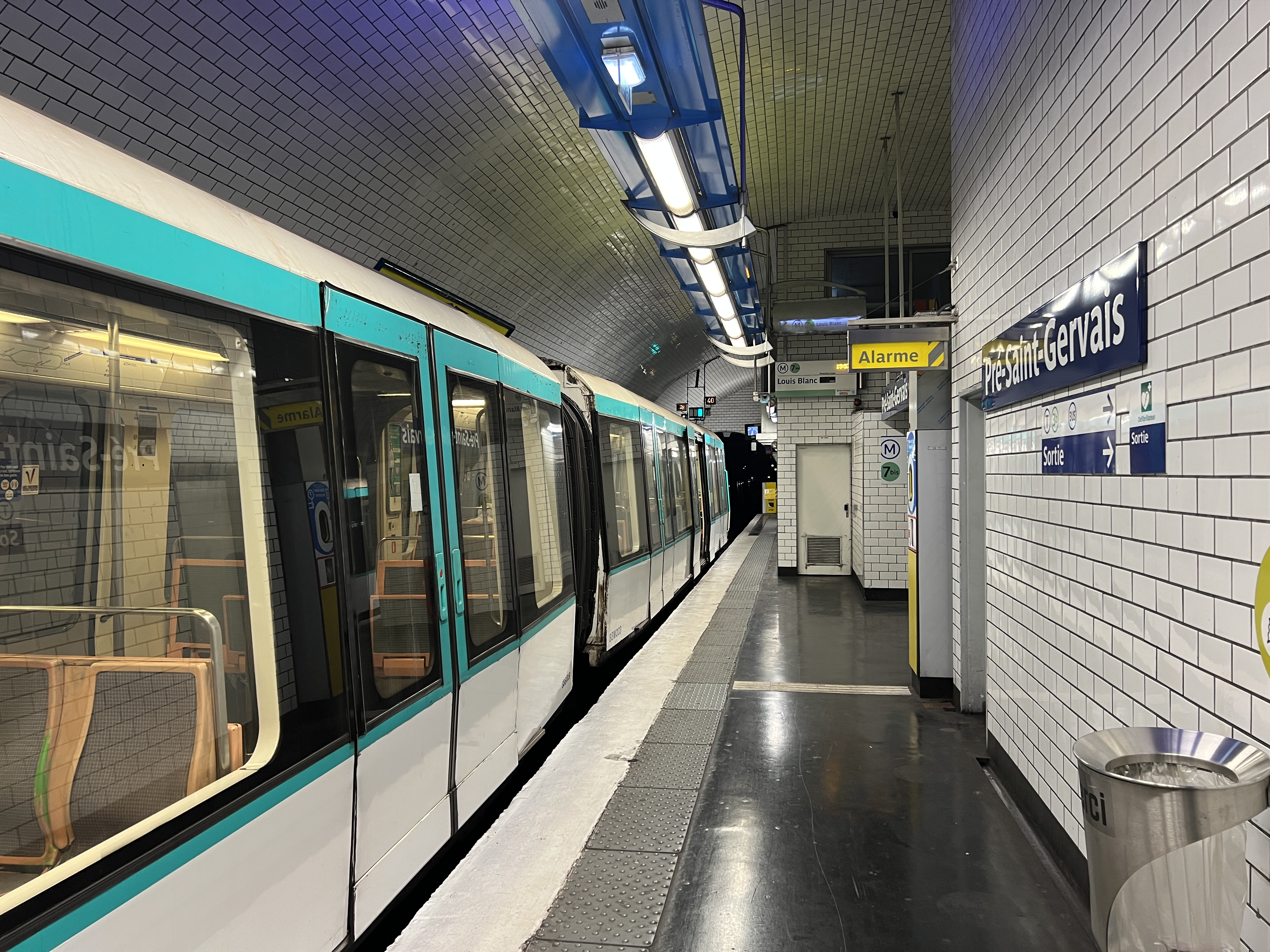
Station platform with an MF 88 train on the left

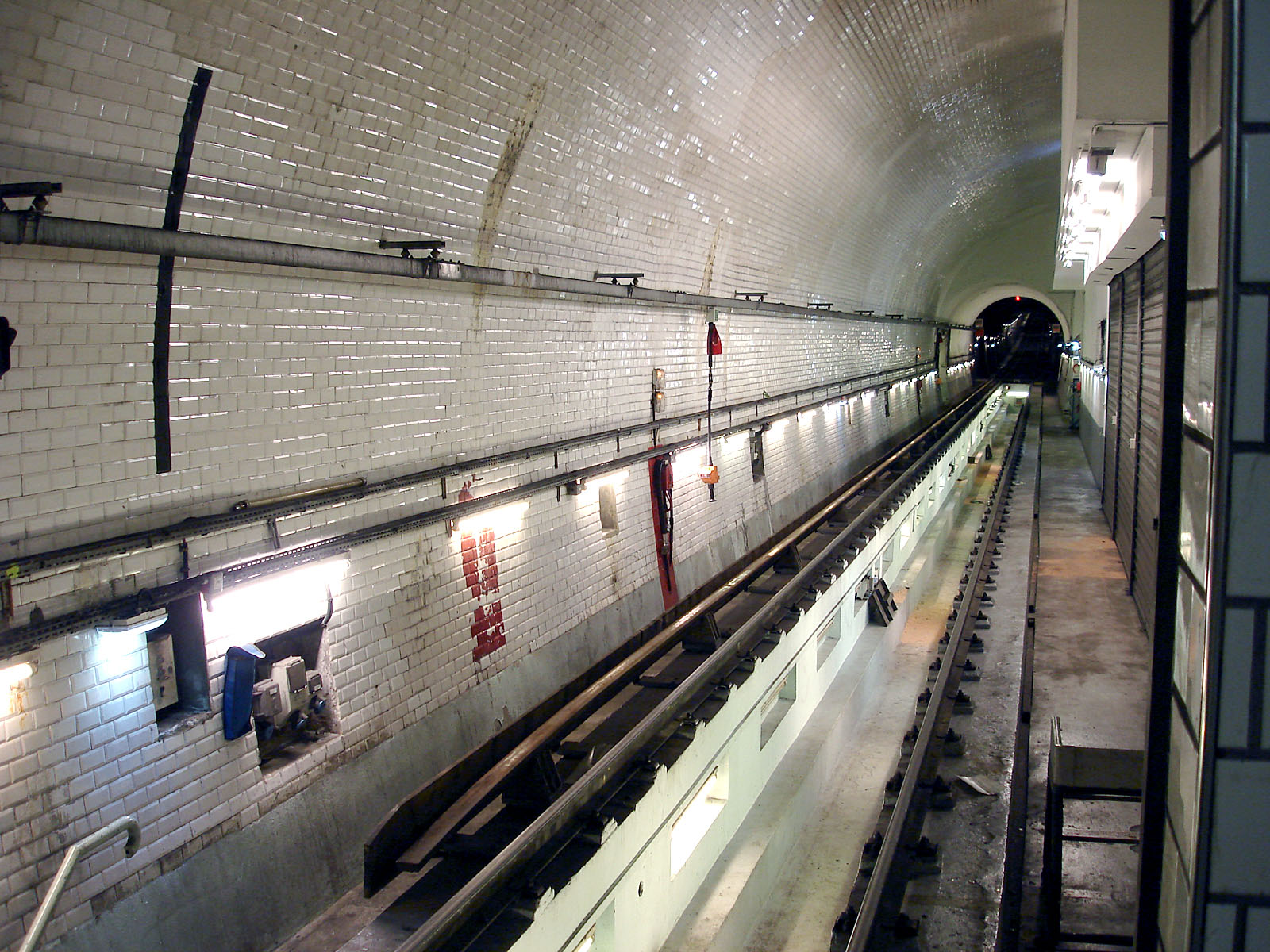
The track not in commercial use
