= Crimée station =

Metro station in Paris, France

Crimée
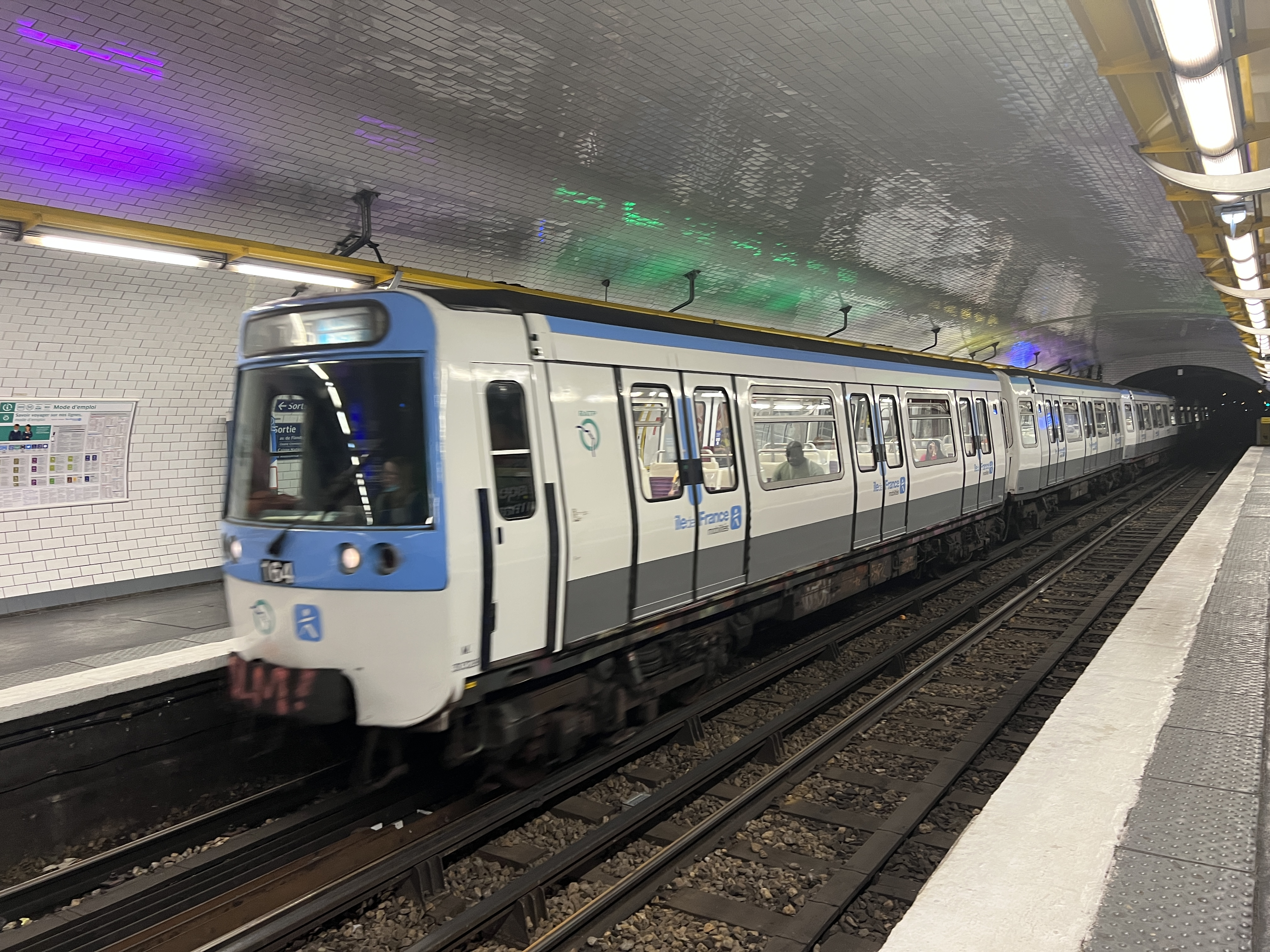
- Platforms at Crimée

General information
- Location: 19th arrondissement of Paris; Île-de-France; France
- Coordinates: 48°53′30″N 2°22′37″E
- System: Paris Metro station
- Owner: RATP
- Operator: RATP
- Line: Paris Metro Paris Metro Line 7
- Platforms: 2 (2 side platforms)
- Tracks: 2

Other information
- Station code: 22-06
- Fare zone: 1

History
- Opened: 5 November 1910; 115 years ago

Passengers
- 2,688,758 (2020)

Services
Preceding station	Paris Metro	Following station
Riquet towards Villejuif–Louis Aragon or Mairie d'Ivry	Line 7	Corentin Cariou towards La Courneuve–8 mai 1945
Location
- Location within Paris

Crimée (French pronunciation: [kʁime]) is a station of the Paris Metro and is located in the 19th arrondissement of Paris under avenue de Flandre. The station is named after the nearby rue de Crimée, the longest road in the arrondissement, whose name commemorates the Crimean War (1855–56), on the Crimean Peninsula of the Russian Empire on the Black Sea, where a coalition of Turkey, the United Kingdom, France, and Piedmont faced Russia. It was notable for the Siege of Sevastopol (1854–1855) and the Charge of the Light Brigade. The conflict ended in the Treaty of Paris (1856), with the Russian Empire's defeat.

== History ==
The station opened on 5 November 1910 with the commissioning of the first section of line 7 between Opéra and Porte de la Villette with service provided by all trains on the line until 18 January 1911, when a branch opened from Louis Blanc to Pré-Saint-Gervais, resulting in 1 of every 2 trains serving this branch. It was once again served by all trains on the line when the branch from Louis Blanc to Pré-Saint-Gervais was split to form an independent line, line 7bis, on 3 December 1967. As part of the Un métro + beau programme by the RATP, the station was renovated and modernised on 25 July 2003.

On 27 May 1978, the Guimard entrance on Rue Mathis was listed as a historical monument.

On 1 April 2016, half of the nameplates on the station's platforms were temporarily replaced by the RATP as part of April Fool's Day, along with 12 other stations. It was humorously renamed "Châtiment" (punishment), a reference to Crime and Punishment, a novel by Fyodor Dostoevsky.

In 2019, the station was used by 5,431,969 passengers, making it the 74th busiest of the Metro network, out of 302 stations.

In 2020, the station was used by 2,688,758 passengers amidst the COVID-19 pandemic, making it the 65th busiest of the Metro network, out of 305 stations.

== Passenger services ==
=== Access ===
The station has 3 entrances:

- Entrance 1: Avenue de Flandre Centre Commercial
- Entrance 2: Caisse Nationale d'Assurance Vieillesse
- Entrance 3: Rue Mathis (with a Guimard entrance)

=== Station layout ===
Street Level
B1	Mezzanine
Line 7 platforms	Side platform, doors will open on the right
Line 7 platforms	Southbound	← toward Villejuif–Louis Aragon or Mairie d'Ivry (Riquet)
Line 7 platforms	Northbound	toward La Courneuve–8 mai 1945 (Corentin Cariou) →
Line 7 platforms	Side platform, doors will open on the right

=== Platforms ===
Crimée has a standard configuration with two tracks surrounded by two side platforms and the vault is elliptical. The decoration is in yellow Ouï-dire style. The lighting canopies, of the same colour, are supported by curved supports in the shape of a scythe. The direct lighting is white while the indirect lighting, projected on the vault, is multicolored. The white ceramic tiles are flat and cover the walls, vault and tunnel exits. The advertising frames are yellow and cylindrical and the name of the station is inscribed in Parisine font on enamelled plates. The platforms are equipped with silver sit-stand benches as well as hull seats, typical of the Motte style, whose hue, changed from yellow to blue, breaking the colorimetric uniformity of the decoration.

=== Other connections ===
The station is also served by lines 54, 60, and 71 of the RATP bus network, and at night, by line N42 of the Noctilien bus network.

== Nearby ==
- Cours Florent
- La Villette Basin
- Ourcq Canal
- Théâtre Paris-Villette

== Gallery ==
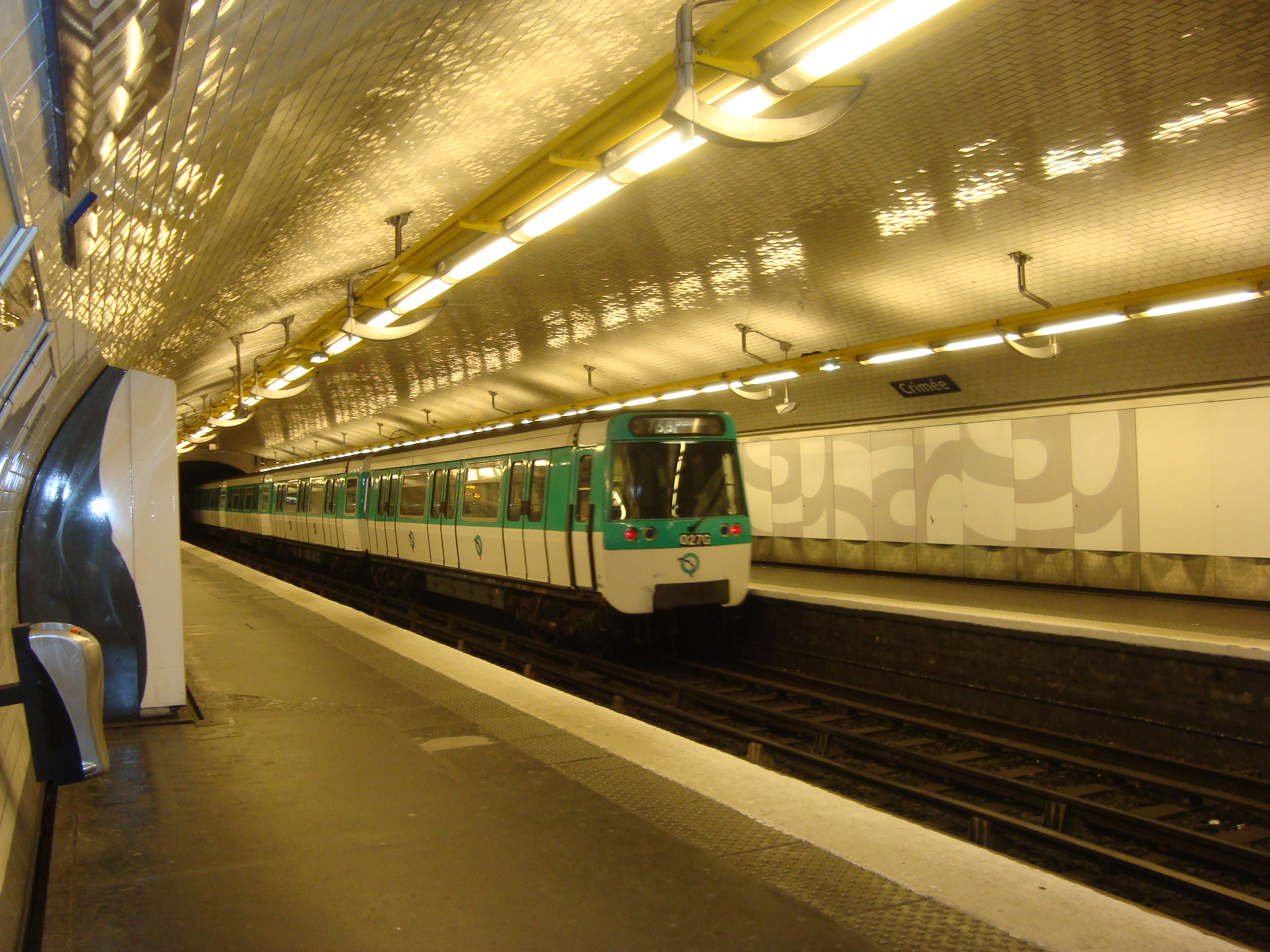
MF 77 at Crimée

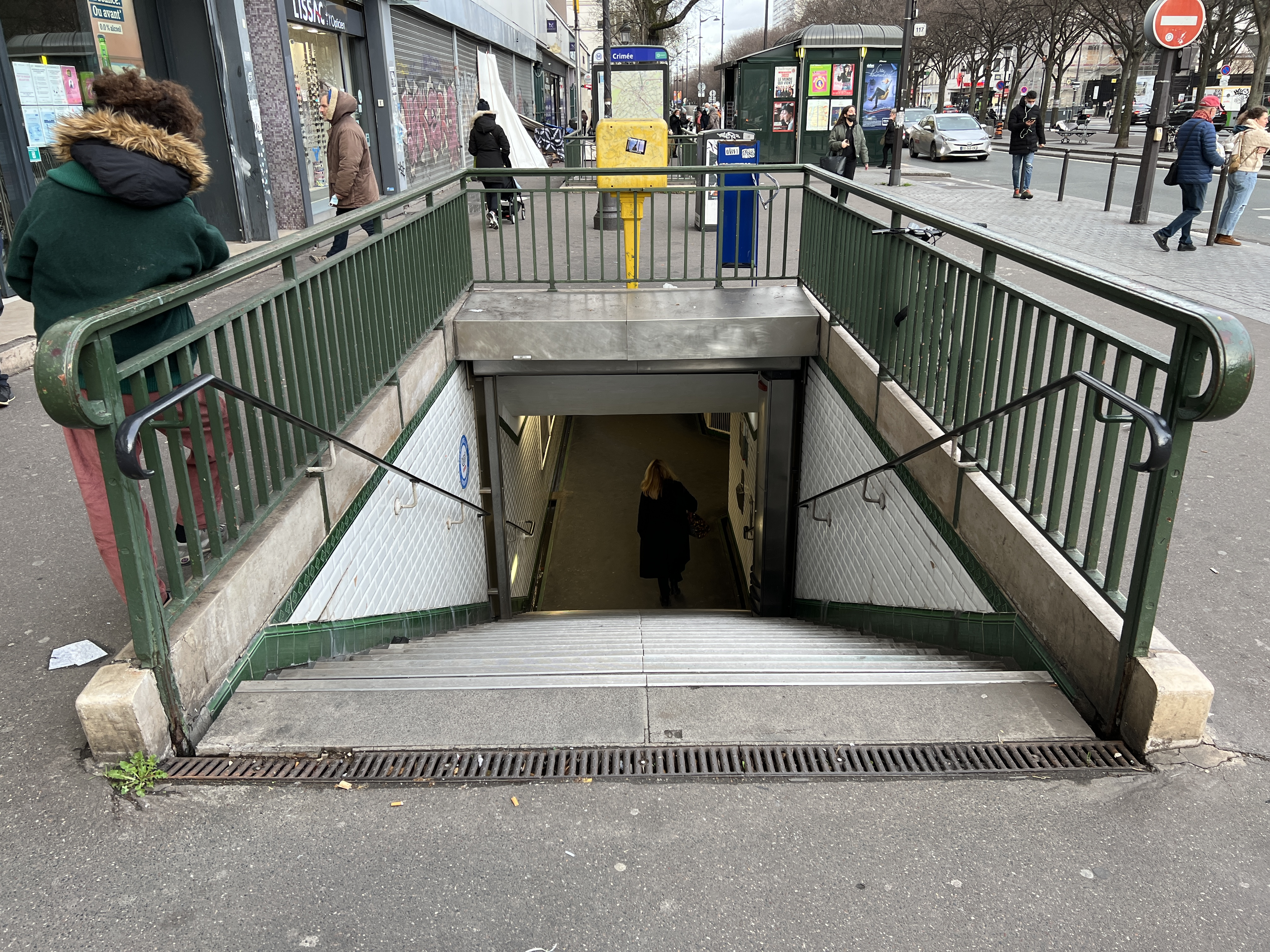
Entrance at Avenue de Flandre

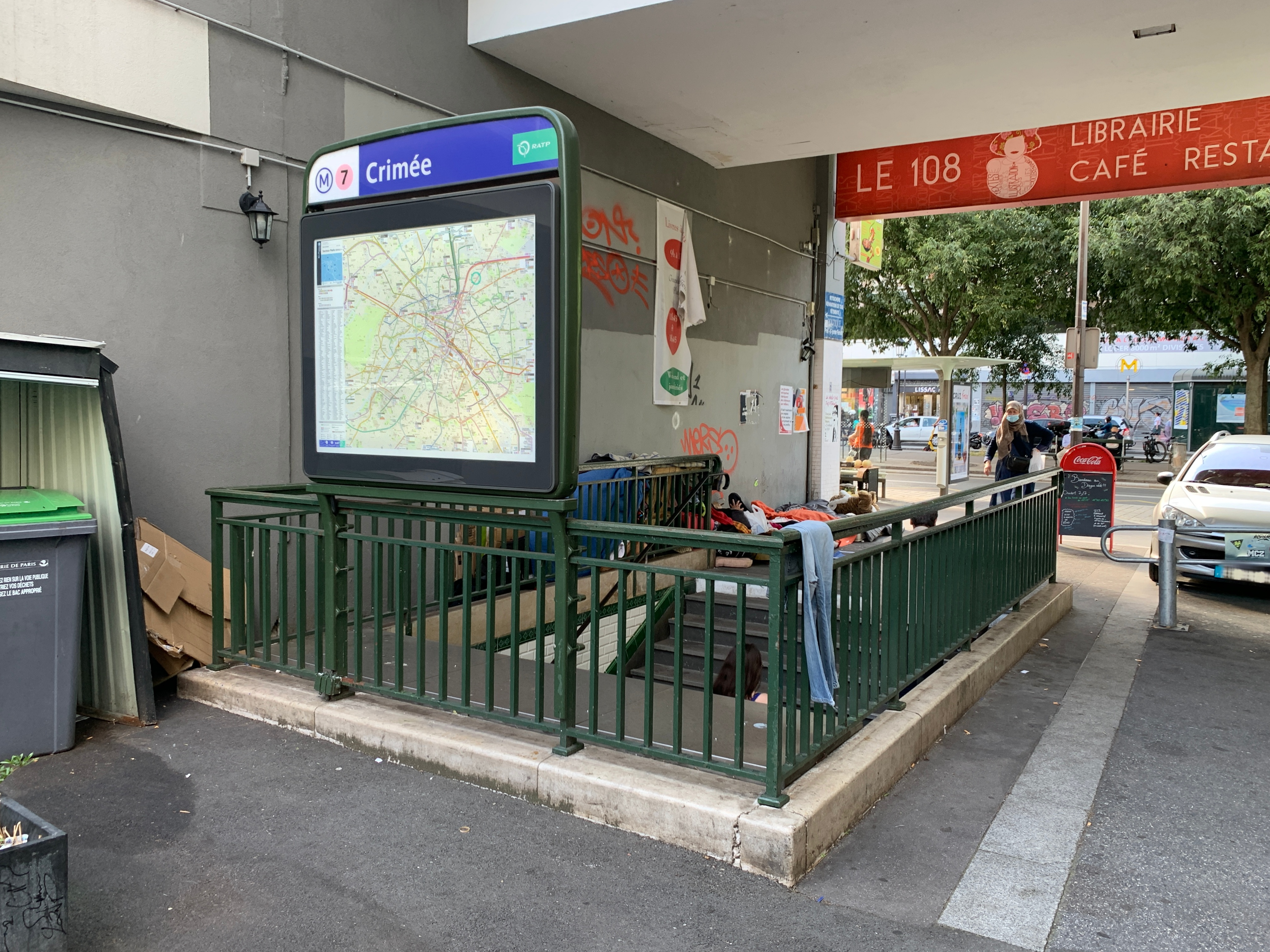
Entrance at Impasse Joinville

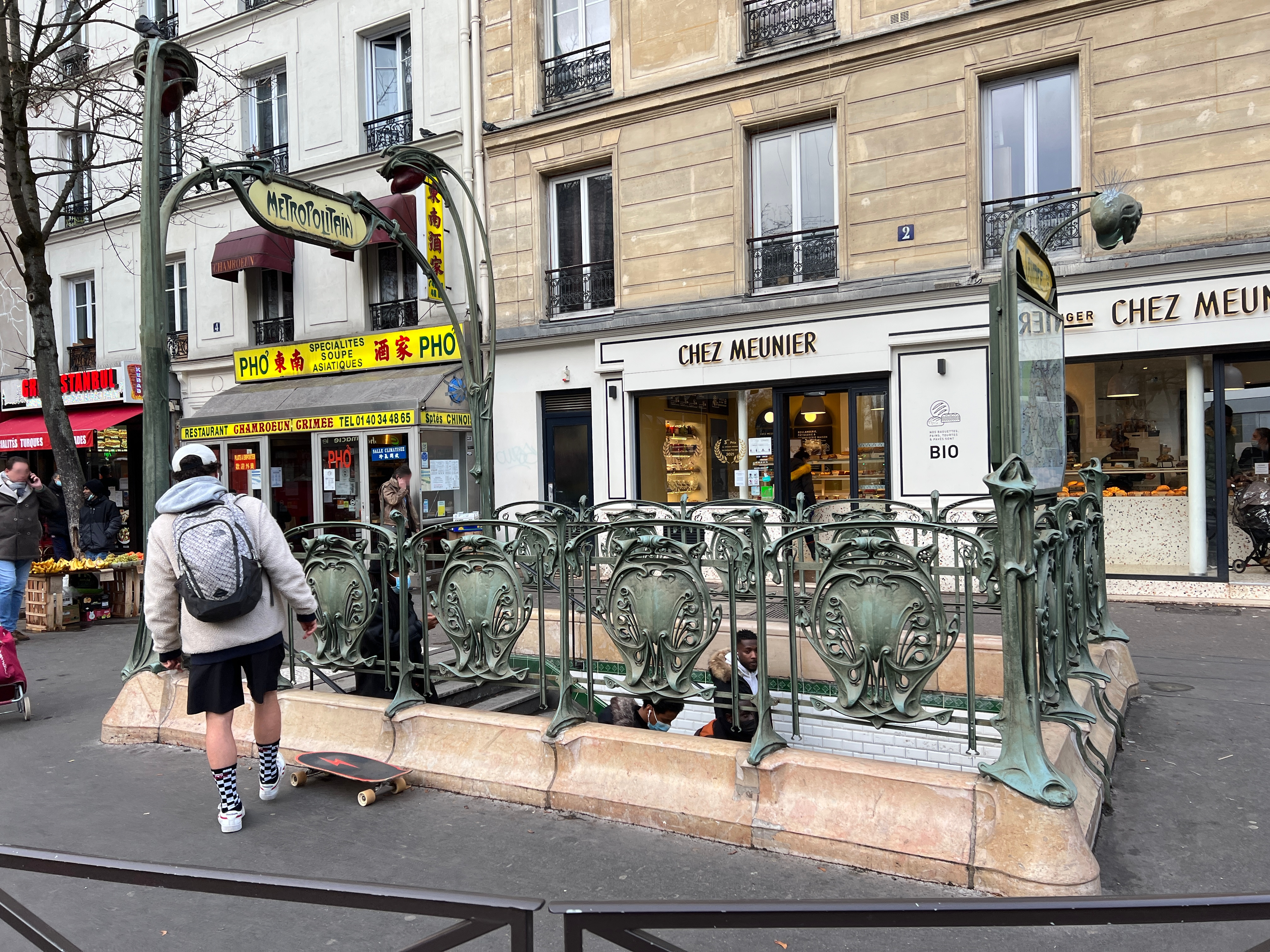
Entrance at Rue Mathis

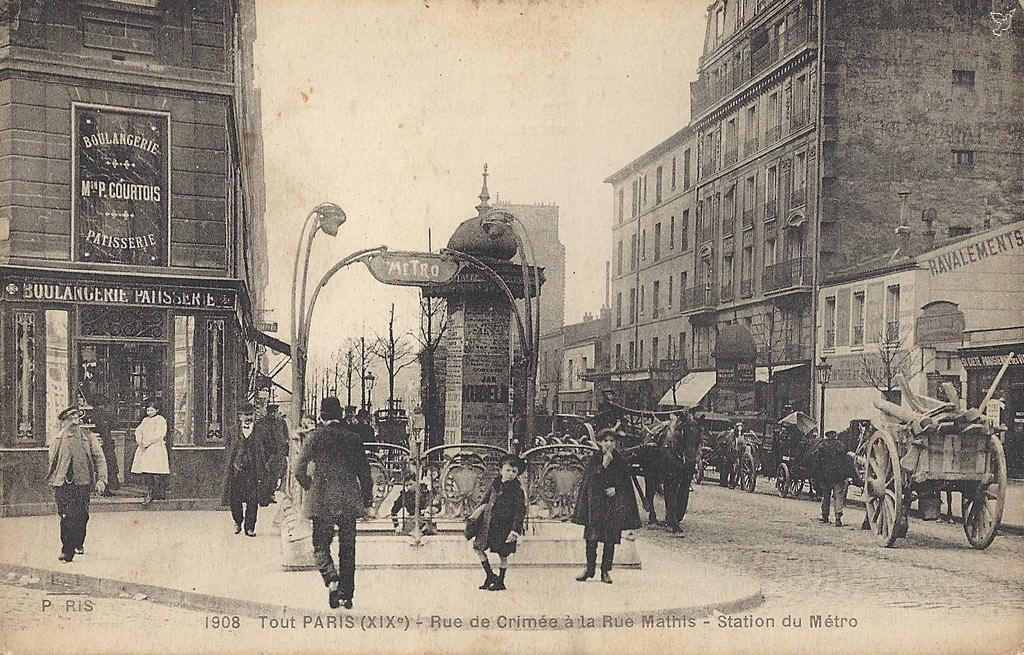
Guimard entrance at Rue Mathis (1908)
