= Cimetière parisien de Pantin =

Cemetery in Pantin, Île-de-France, France

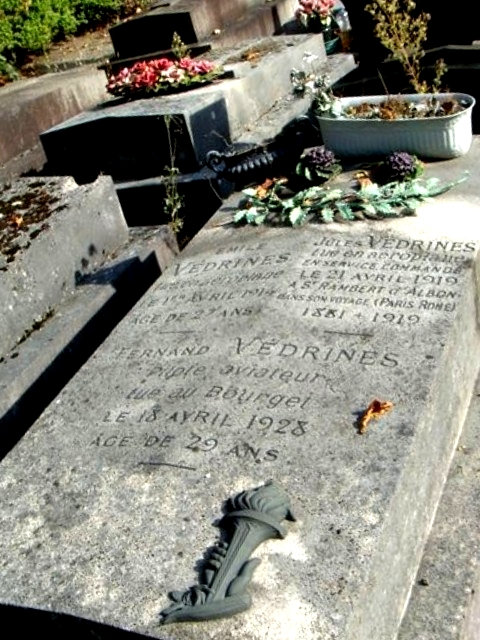
- The grave of French aviator Jules Védrines
- Interactive map of Cimetière parisien de Pantin

Details
- Established: 1886
- Location: Pantin
- Country: France
- Coordinates: 48.904444°N 2.41027°E
- Type: Public, non-denominational
- Style: Rural cemetery
- Owned by: Mairie de Paris
- Size: 107 hectares (260 acres)
- No. of graves: 200,000+
- No. of interments: over 1 million

The Cimetière parisien de Pantin (sometimes known as cimetière parisien de Pantin-Bobigny) is one of the three Parisien cemeteries extra muros, located in the commune of Pantin which is in Seine-Saint-Denis, Île-de-France.

== History ==
The cemetery was opened on November 15, 1886. Pantin is one of the three Parisien Cemeteries extra muros, the others being Cimetière parisien de Thiais (opened in 1929) and Cimetière parisien de Bagneux (also opened in 1886).

Since its opening, one million people have been buried in the cemetery, with nearly 5,000 interments taking place annually.

== Notes ==
Pantin is the largest cemetery of Paris, both in number of graves and land area. It is also the largest cemetery in France. Pantin is a garden style burial ground with more than 8,000 trees and streets (a network of 32 kilometers of roads) that allow access by (motor) vehicles.

It has nearly 200,000 graves, grouped in 180 divisions. The cemetery of Pantin is a vast necropolis. The oldest graves are in the first seventeen divisions.

Many of the burials are from the Jewish community (France has the largest Jewish community in Europe) and more recently from the Chinese Buddhist community.

Marthe Erbelding was buried here (her grave was cleared in 1960). Erbelding was an 11-year-old girl who was raped and murdered by a friend of her parents in 1907. The details of this gruesome crime were widely reported on. As a result the abolition of capital punishment was delayed for another 60 years.

Ilan Halimi, the young French Jew, who was kidnapped and tortured to death in 2006, was temporarily buried in Pantin before being reburied in Har HaMenuchot cemetery in Israel on February 9, 2007.

It is one of the least known of the many Parisian cemeteries. The cemetery is a socio-economic reflection of the past decades, with graves for both rich and poor. It has been mentioned in songs such as Vincent Delerm's Les Trottoirs à l’envers, Pierre Perret's Ils s’aimaient and Mano Solo's Le Monde Entier.

In July 1973, one hundred Jewish tombstones were desecrated at the cemetery. In addition, some 60 Stars of David were either defaced or smeared.

== Notable interments ==
=== War graves ===
The cemetery contains a small British Commonwealth war graves plot, in Division 6, holding 93 servicemen of World War I, some casualties who died in military hospitals after evacuation from the Western Front, the later ones those stationed in the area after the Armistice. The plot is amidst French military war graves.

=== Individual burials ===
Because even the cemetery does not seem to have an exhaustive list of burials and the amount of burials is vast, only a selection:

- Frédéric Othon Théodore Aristidès (1931–2013), artist
- Jeanne Aubert (1906–1988), actress
- Jacques Audiberti (1899–1965), writer
- Doris Bensimon (1924–2009), Austrian-born French sociologist and academic
- Émile Bernard (1868–1941), painter
- Boris Bouieff (1925–1979), writer (anonymous, plain, earthen grave in division 54)
- Thomas Breakwell (1872–1902), Baháʼí Faith convert
- Eugène Criqui (1893–1977), boxer
- Damia (1892–1978), singer
- René Daumal (1908–1944), writer
- Gabrielle Fontan (1873–1959), actress
- Fratellini family members, circus family
- Fréhel (1891–1951), singer
- Wiera Gran (1916–2007), singer
- Constantin Guys (1802–1892) Dutch-born painter
- Alphonse Halimi (1932–2006), boxer
- André Hardellet (1911–1974), poet and writer
- Helno (1963–1993), singer with Les Négresses Vertes
- Véra Korène (1901–1996), Russian-born actress
- Ludwik de Laveaux (painter) (1868–1894), Polish painter
- Ginette Leclerc (1912–1991), actress
- Emmanuel Lévinas (1906–1995), philosopher
- Jean-Pierre Melville (1917–1973), film director/producer, Resistance fighter
- Reinette L'Oranaise (1918–1998), singer
- San Yu (1901–1966), Chinese-French painter
- Savielly Tartakower (1887–1956), Polish-French chess Grandmaster, chess journalist and author
- Jules Védrines (1881–1919), aviator
- Louis Vivin (1861–1936) primitivist painter
- Ilarie Voronca (1903–1946), poet
- Louise Weber (1866–1929), Cancan dancer, later reinterred at Montmartre Cemetery
- Jean d'Yd (1880–1964), actor

=== Notable ornaments ===
- The grave of private Germain Verlé, with a sculpture by Georges Meynial (division 15)
- The massive tomb in division 9, dedicated to mes maîtres Déon et Dea

=== Monuments ===
Spread around the cemetery there are memorials for certain events such as for the victims of the Transports Aériens Intercontinentaux crash of 1956 (in division 126).

== Location ==
The main entrance to the Cimetière parisien de Pantin is on 164 Avenue Jean Jaurès (it is actually on Avenue du Cimetière Parisien), in Pantin (one of the banlieu of Paris). There is also a gate named Porte de Petits Points on Avenue du Général Leclerc (near the junction with Chemin des Vignes). There are two other gates, Porte de Pailleux and Porte d'Illustration, but these are only open on Rosh Hashanah and All Saints' Day. The cemetery is located next to Fort d'Aubervilliers.

== Public transport ==
The cemetery is a short walk from the Aubervilliers – Pantin – Quatre Chemins or Fort d'Aubervilliers métro stations, which can be reached by taking line 7. The nearest railway station is Pantin which is served by line E.

The cemetery is also served by bus lines 151 and 152.

There is a Vélib' station at Avenue Jean Jaurès (35001).
