= Aubervilliers–Pantin–Quatre Chemins station =

Paris Métro station

Aubervilliers–Pantin–Quatre Chemins
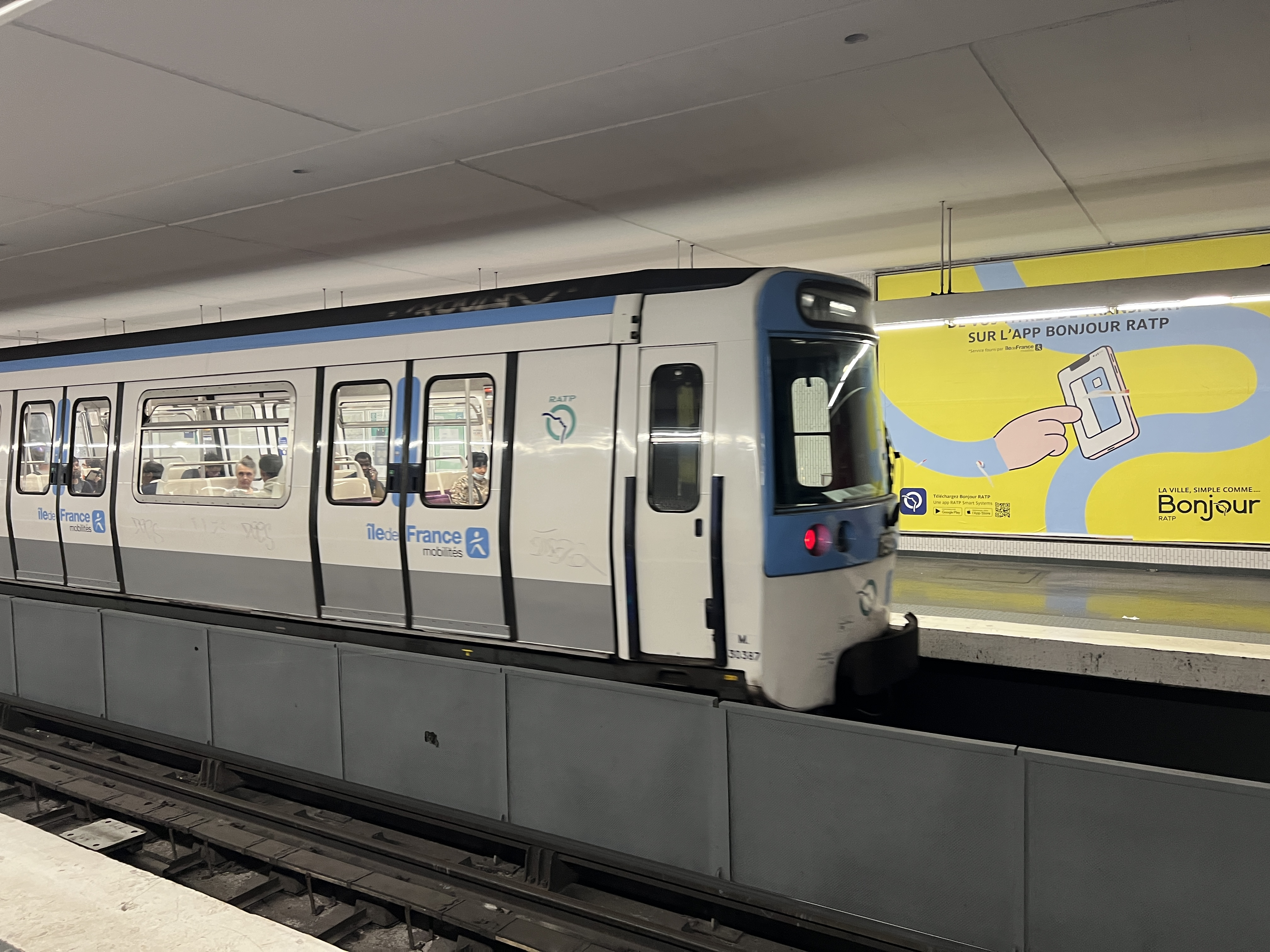
- Renovated MF 77 rolling stock on Aubervilliers–Pantin–Quatre Chemins in 2022

General information
- Location: Aubervilliers; Île-de-France; France
- Coordinates: 48°54′14″N 2°23′33″E
- System: Paris Métro station
- Owner: RATP
- Operator: RATP
- Line: Paris Metro Paris Metro Line 7
- Platforms: 2 (2 side platforms)
- Tracks: 2

Other information
- Station code: 03-05
- Fare zone: 2

History
- Opened: 4 October 1979; 46 years ago

Passengers
- 4,131,018 (2020)

Services
Preceding station	Paris Metro	Following station
Porte de la Villette towards Villejuif–Louis Aragon or Mairie d'Ivry	Line 7	Fort d'Aubervilliers towards La Courneuve–8 mai 1945
Location
- Location within Paris

Aubervilliers–Pantin–Quatre Chemins (French pronunciation: [obɛʁvilje pɑ̃tɛ̃ katʁ(ə) ʃəmɛ̃]) is a station of the Paris Métro. It is at the crossroads of the Roman road that led from Lutetia to east Flanders (now the N2) and the road between the communes of Aubervilliers and Pantin.

== History ==
Aubervilliers–Pantin–Quatre Chemins opened on 4 October 1979 as part of an extension from Porte de la Villette to Fort d'Aubervilliers.

In 2019, the station was used by 7,215,915 passengers, making it the 37th busiest of the Métro network, out of 302 stations.

In 2020, the station was used by 4,131,018 passengers amidst the COVID-19 pandemic, making it the 27th busiest of the Métro network, out of 305 stations.

== Passenger services ==
=== Access ===
The station has 5 entrances along avenue de la République and avenue Jean-Jaurès.

=== Station layout ===
Street Level
B1	Mezzanine
Line 7 platforms	Side platform, doors will open on the right
Line 7 platforms	Southbound	← toward Villejuif – Louis Aragon or Mairie d'Ivry (Riquet)
Line 7 platforms	Northbound	toward La Courneuve–8 mai 1945 (Corentin Cariou) →
Line 7 platforms	Side platform, doors will open on the right

=== Platforms ===
The station has a standard configuration with 2 tracks surrounded by 2 side platforms.

=== Other connections ===
The station is also served by lines 150, 152, 170, and 249 of the RATP bus network, and at night, by line N42 of the Noctilien bus network.

== Nearby ==
- Église Sainte-Marthe des Quatre-Chemins

== Gallery ==
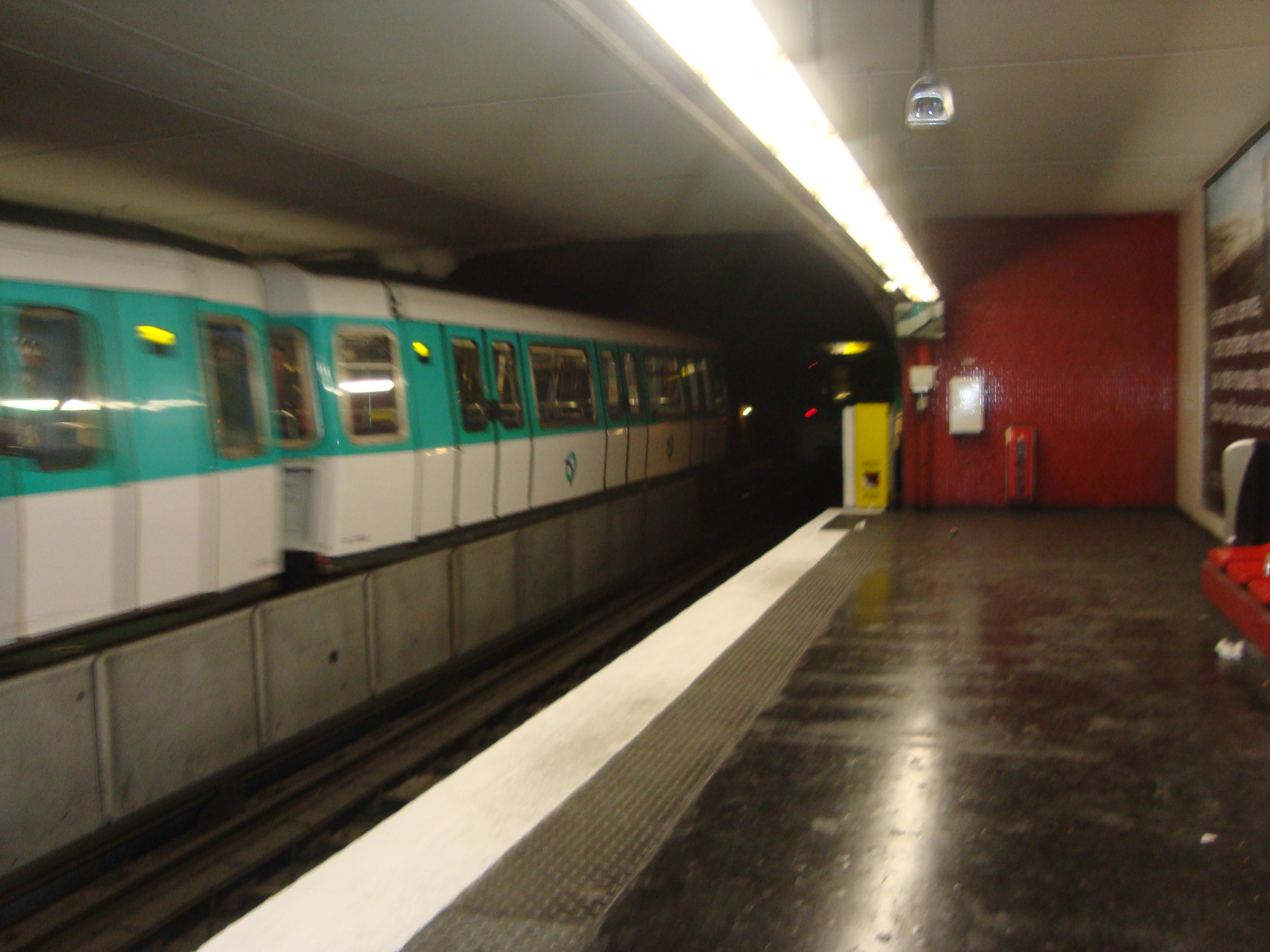
MF 77 at Aubervilliers–Pantin–Quatre Chemins

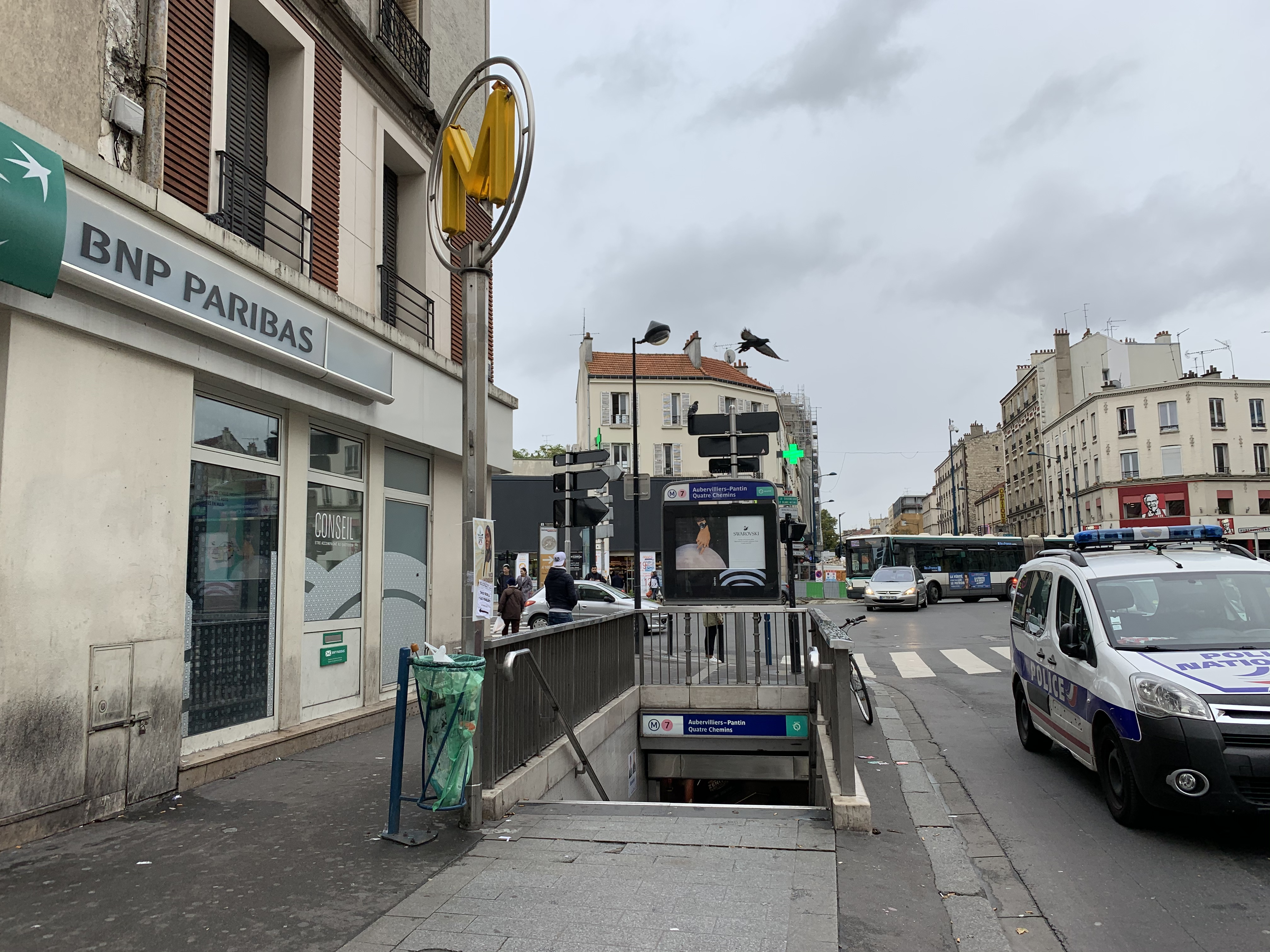
One of the entrances of the station
