= Doris Bensimon =

French sociologist

- Born: 1924; Vienna, Austria
- Died: 8 December 2009 (aged 84–85); Paris, France
- Occupation: Sociologist of religion
- Employers: CNRS; University of Caen; INALCO

Doris Bensimon (also known as Doris Bensimon-Donath; 1924 – 8 December 2009) was an Austrian-born French sociologist and academic whose research focused on the study of contemporary Judaism. She taught at the University of Caen and Institut national des langues et civilisations orientales (INALCO).

== Early life and education ==
Doris Donath was born in 1924 in Vienna, Austria. Her father was Robert Donath (born 12 June 1883, Vienna). After the Anschluss, the Donath family left Austria and removed to Antwerp, before coming to Lille, France, where it was protected by the Préfet du Nord. On 11 September 1942 Robert was deported by Convoy No. 31 to Auschwitz via Drancy internment camp, where he was killed, at age 59. With her mother, Bensimon took refuge in Lyon.

Bensimon received a State doctorate.

== Career ==
Bensimon became a researcher at the Centre national de la recherche scientifique (CNRS) where she was responsible for the team working on the sociology of Judaism, within the Groupe de Sociologie des Religions ("Sociology Group of Religions"). She also became a professor at the University of Caen and at INALCO in Paris.

== Personal life ==
Bensimon died on 8 December 2009 in the 9th arrondissement of Paris. She is buried next to her husband, in the Cimetière parisien de Pantin.

== Selected works ==
- L'évolution de la femme israelite à Fès, 1962
- Évolution du judaïsme marocain sous le protectorat français, 1912-1956, 1968
- Immigrants d'Afrique du Nord en Israël : évolution et adaptation, 1970
- Follow-up des anciens élèves des écoles juives à plein temps : rapport d'enquête, 1971
- L'intégration des juifs nord-africains en France, 1971
- Social integration of North African Jews in Israel, 1973
- Les mariages mixtes., 1975
- Judaïcité parisienne et migrations à la fin du XIXe et au début du XXe siècle., 1975
- Education en Israel., 1976
- Un mariage : deux traditions, 1977
- Israel et ses populations, 1977
- Communautés juives (1880-1978) : sources et méthodes de recherches, 1978
- Socio-démographie des juifs de France et d'Algérie, 1867-1907, 1976
- L'Irruption de l'Occident : les Juifs du Maroc., 1982
- Mondeville : Changement social et vie quotidienne dans une banlieue ouvrière, 1983
- La population juive de France : socio-démographie et identité, 1984 (with Sergio Della Pergola) (Note: According to Morton (2003), Bensimon's and Sergio Della Pergola's La Population juive de France: Socio-Demographie et identite (Jerusalem, 1984) "represents the most important study conducted on modern French Jewish demography, social behavior, and identity".)
- Les Grandes rafles : juifs en France, 1940-1944, 1987
- The teaching of Jewish civilization at European universities : report with maps and an inventory of institutions, 1988
- Identité et acculturation, 1988
- Israéliens : des juifs et des arabes, 1989
- Judaïsme, sciences et techniques : actes du colloque, 1989
- Les Juifs d’Algérie. Mémoires et identités plurielles, 1989 (with Joëlle Allouche-Benayoun)
- Les Juifs de France et leurs relations avec Israël (1945-1988), 1989
- Science et technologie en Israël, 1990
- Religion et état en Israel, 1992
- Les juifs dans le monde au tournant du XXIe siècle, 1994
- Israéliens et Palestiniens : la longue marche vers la paix, 1995
- Juifs d'Europe centrale et orientale, 1945-1996, 1997
- Israele e la diaspora : gli ebrei nel mondo, 1999
- Adolph Donath : 1876-1937 : parcours d'un intellectuel juif germanophone : Vienne, Berlin, Prague, 2000
- Migrations juives en Diaspora après 1945, 2001
- Juifs en Allemagne aujourd'hui, 2004
- Quotidien du vingtième siècle : histoire d'une vie mouvementée, 2007
