= Porte de la Villette station =

Metro station in Paris, France

Porte de la Villette Cité des Sciences et de l'Industrie
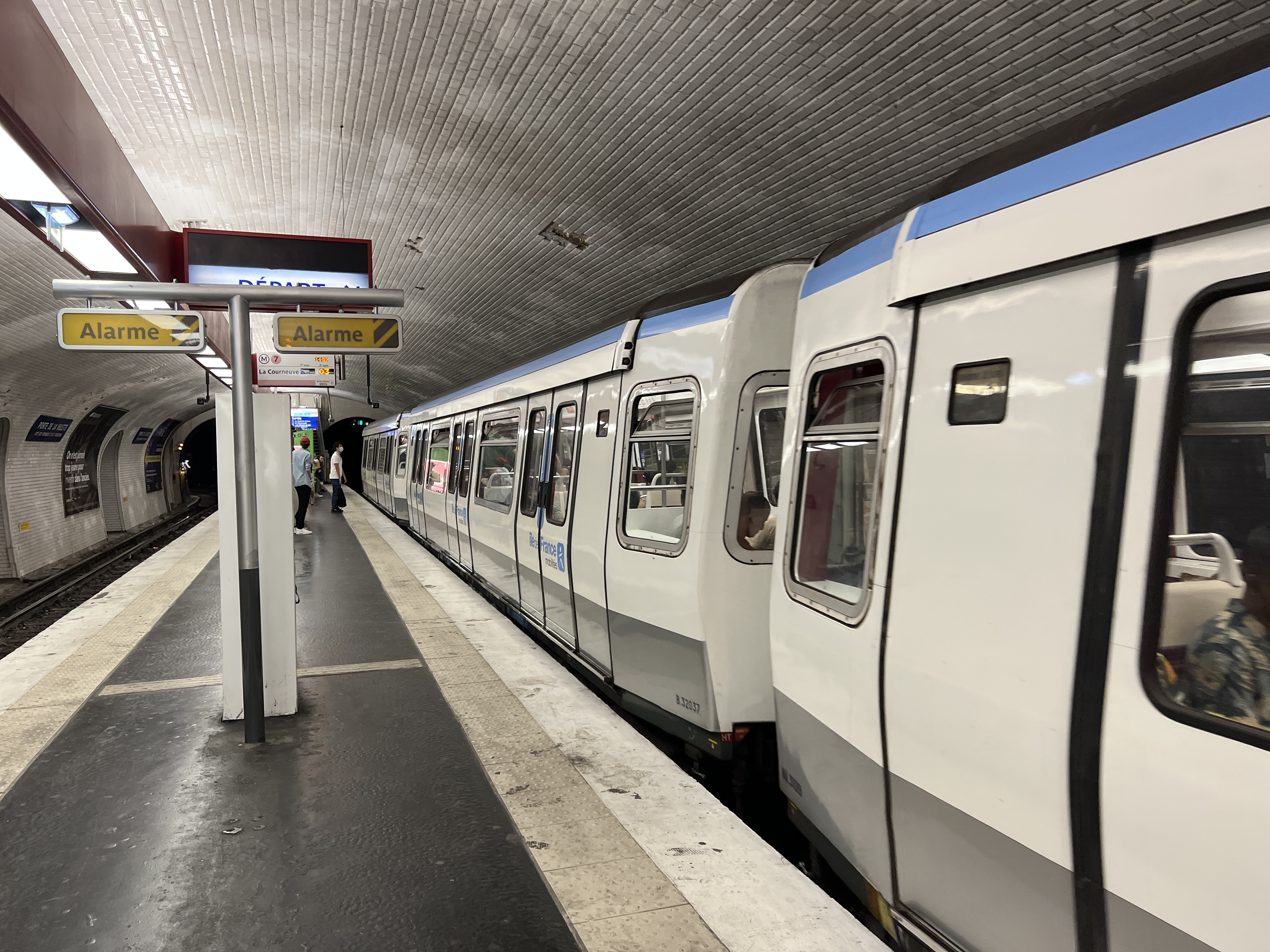
- The Northbound half-station in Porte de la Villette

General information
- Location: 19th arrondissement of Paris; Île-de-France; France
- Coordinates: 48°53′50″N 2°23′09″E
- System: Paris Métro station
- Owner: RATP
- Operator: RATP
- Line: Paris Metro Paris Metro Line 7
- Platforms: 2 (2 island platforms)
- Tracks: 4

Other information
- Fare zone: 1

History
- Opened: 5 November 1910; 115 years ago

Passengers
- 1,981,878 (2020)

Services
Preceding station	Paris Metro	Following station
Corentin Cariou towards Villejuif–Louis Aragon or Mairie d'Ivry	Line 7	Aubervilliers–Pantin–Quatre Chemins towards La Courneuve–8 mai 1945
Location
- Location within Paris

Porte de la Villette (French pronunciation: [pɔʁt də la vilɛt]) is a station of the Paris Métro. The origin of the commune of the Villette was a Gallo-Roman village, which grew up on the Roman road that led to eastern Flanders. About 1198, it became Ville Neuve Saint-Ladre and by 1426 it was called Villette-Saint-Miser-lez-Paris. The commune became a part of Paris in 1860. The nearby gate in Paris' 19th century walls hence became known as the Porte de la Villette.

The nearby Cité des Sciences et de l'Industrie, located in the Parc de la Villette, is the biggest science museum in Europe. The glass and steel building was designed by Peter Rice and it was opened in 1986.

The station is featured in Battlefield 3, in which it is featured in a multiplayer map.

== History ==
Porte de la Villette opened on 5 November 1910 with the commissioning of the first section of line 7 from Opéra with service provided by all trains on the line until 18 January 1911, when a branch opened from Louis Blanc to Pré-Saint-Gervais, resulting in 1 of every 2 trains serving this branch. It was once again served by all trains on the line when the branch from Louis Blanc to Pré-Saint-Gervais was split to form an independent line, line 7bis, on 3 December 1967 as a result of an imbalance in traffic between the two branches – the branch to Porte de la Villette having significantly higher traffic due to its role as an important terminus for many suburban buses. It served as the northern terminus of line 7 until 1979 when it was extended to Fort d'Aubervilliers. As part of the "Un métro + beau" programme by the RATP, the station was renovated and modernised on 16 January 2002.

In 2019, the station was used by 3,209,252 passengers, making it the 110th busiest of the Métro network, out of 302 stations.

In 2020, the station was used by 1,981,878 passengers amidst the COVID-19 pandemic, making it the 123rd busiest of the Métro network, out of 305 stations.

An interchange with Paris tramway Line 3b opened on 15 December 2012, serving as its western terminus until its extension to Porte d'Asnières—Marguerite Long on 24 November 2018.

== Passenger services ==
=== Access ===
The station has 5 entrances:

- Access 1: avenue Corentin Cariou
- Access 2: boulevard Macdonald - Cité des Sciences et de l'Industrie
- Access 3: rue du Chemin-de-Fer - Centre d'Événements
- Access 4: avenue de la Porte-de-la-Villette
- Access 5: Parvis de la Cité - Cité des Sciences et de l'Industrie - Centre de Loisirs et de Commerce

=== Station layout ===
Street Level
B1	Mezzanine
Line 7 platforms	Southbound from depot	← toward Villejuif – Louis Aragon or Mairie d'Ivry (Corentin Cariou)
Line 7 platforms	Island platform, doors will open on the left, right
Line 7 platforms	Southbound	← toward Villejuif – Louis Aragon or Mairie d'Ivry (Corentin Cariou)
Line 7 platforms	Northbound to depot	alighting passengers only →
Line 7 platforms	Island platform, doors will open on the left, right
Line 7 platforms	Northbound	toward La Courneuve–8 mai 1945 (Aubervilliers – Pantin – Quatre Chemins) →

=== Platforms ===
The station has, as does Porte de Pantin located on the same line, a particular arrangement specific to the stations serving or had served as a terminus. It has 2 identical half-stations each with an island platform surrounded by two tracks, the same layout as Château de Vincennes on line 1 and Porte de Champerret on line 3. As it was a former terminus, a turning loop is provided beyond the station towards La Courneuve–8 mai 1945. It is also where the sole connection to the La Villette workshops is in the métro, where equipment used to maintain the network (sleepers, switches, rails, etc.) are stored.

=== Other connections ===
The station is also served by lines 71, 139, 150, and 152 of the RATP bus network, and at night, by lines N42 and N140 of the Noctilien bus network.

== Gallery ==
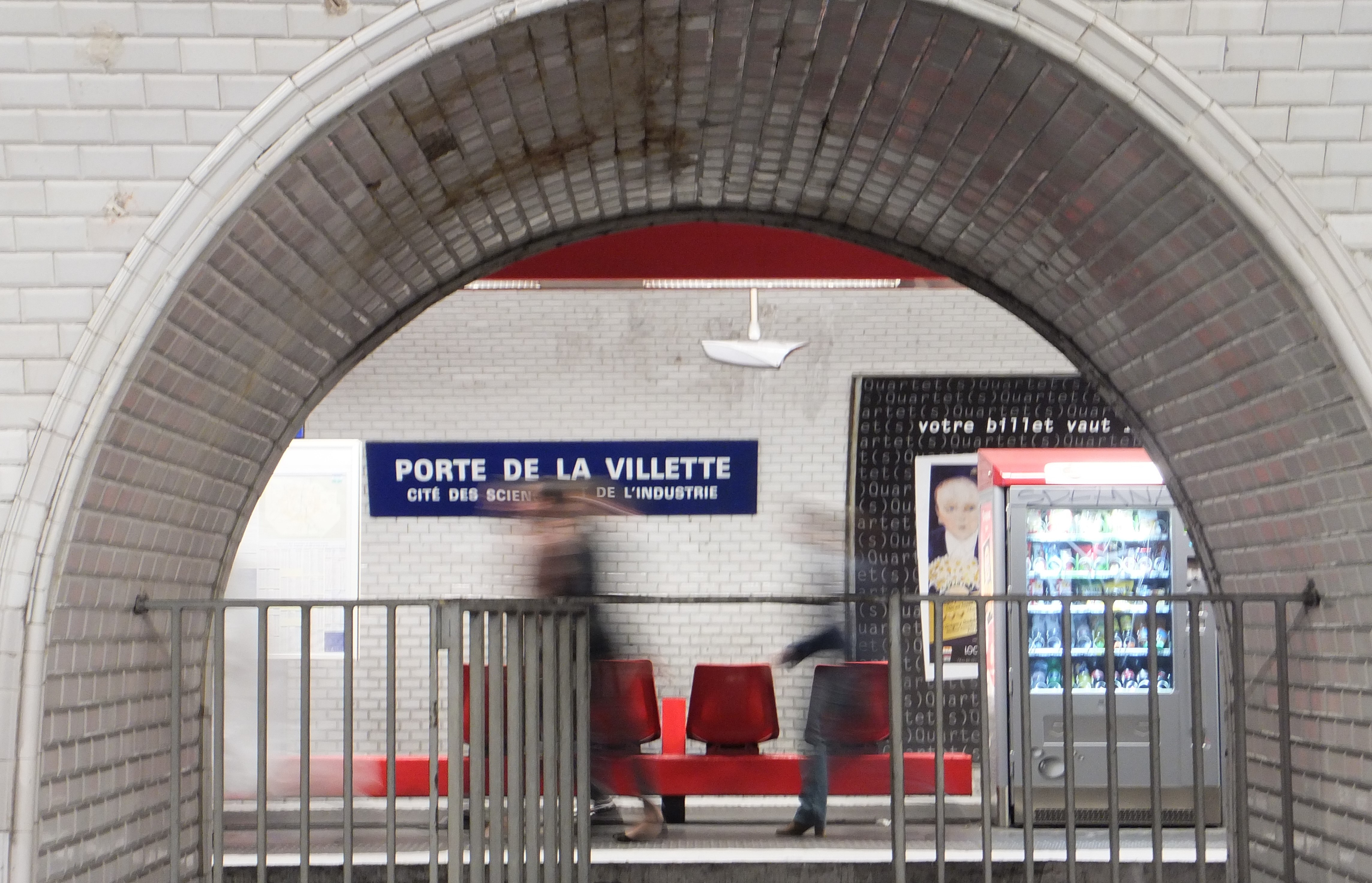
View of the northbound half-station from the southbound half-station

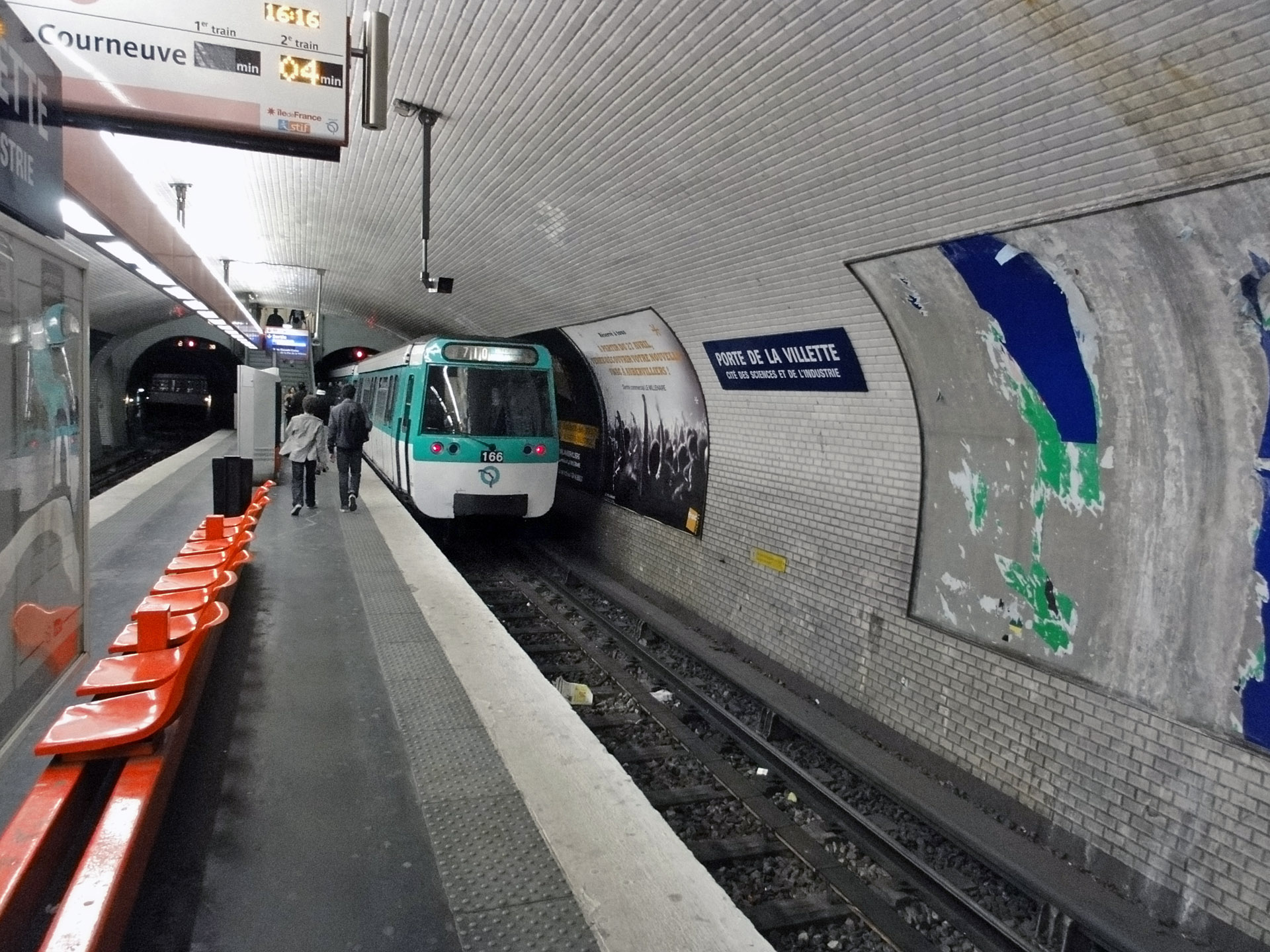
MF 77 at Porte de la Villette

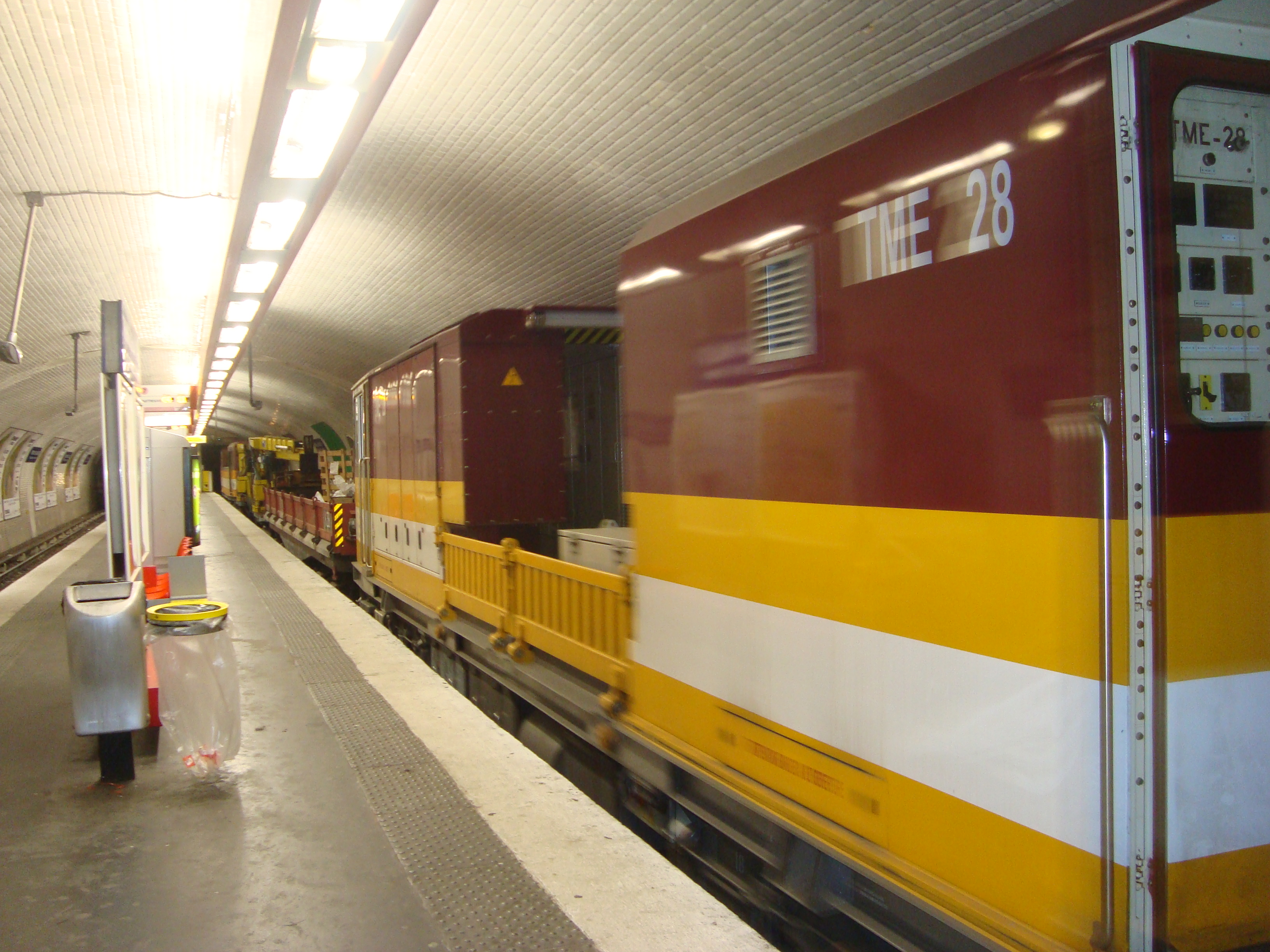
Maintenance train running through the station

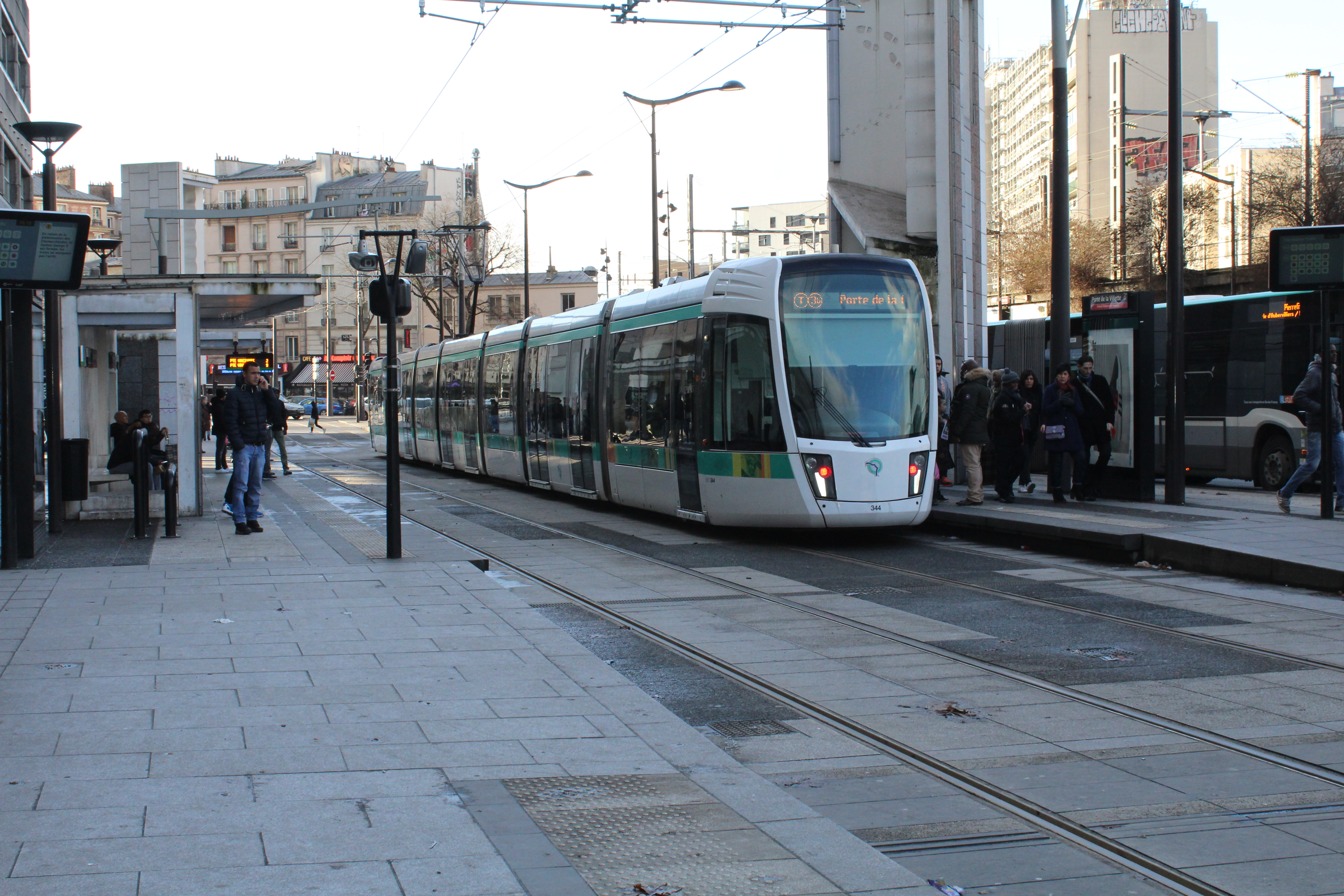
Tramway 3b's station at Porte de la Villette

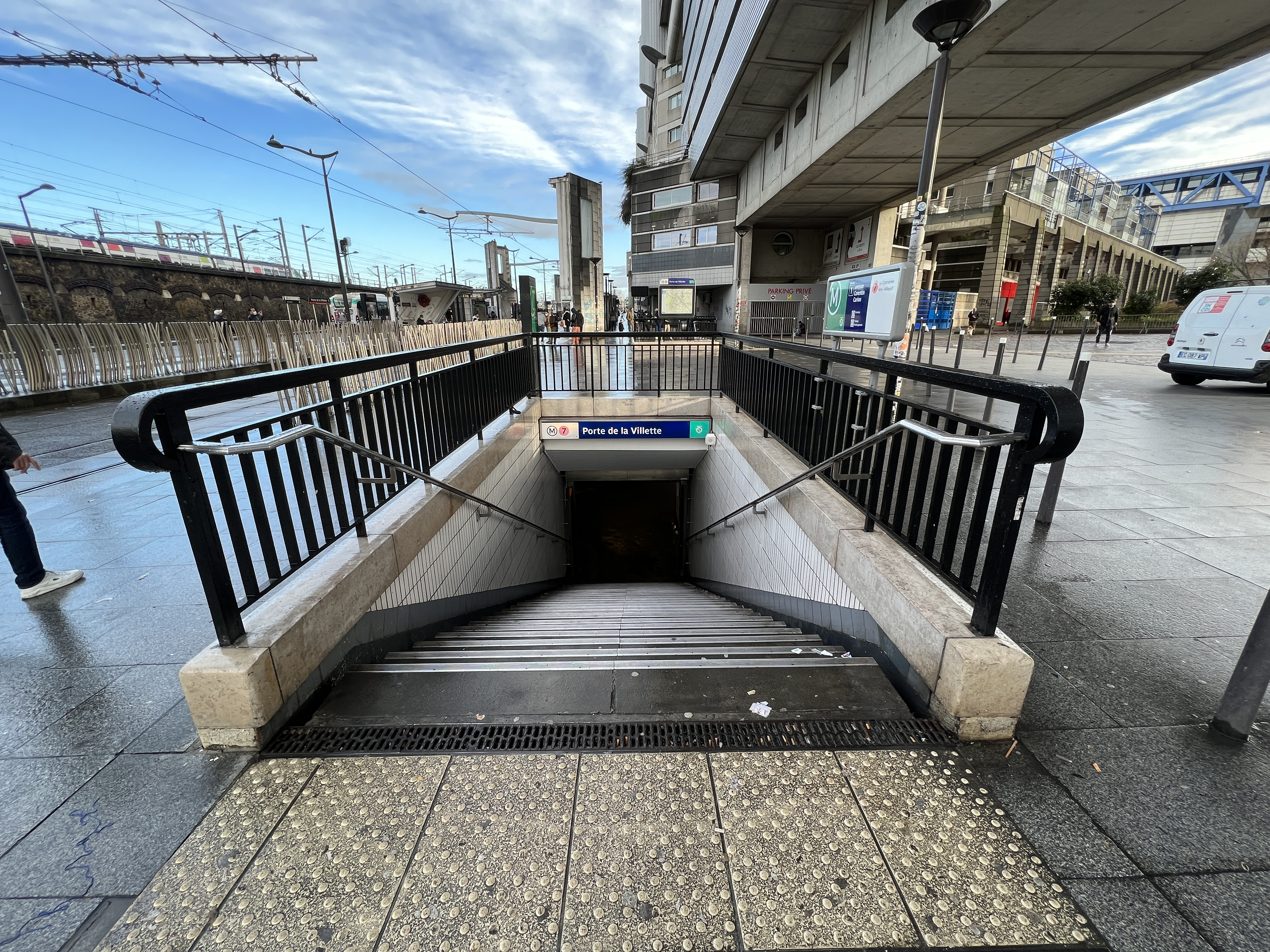
Entrance along boulevard Macdonald
