= Fort d'Aubervilliers =

Fortification in Paris, France

- Part of Thiers fortifications of Paris
- Aubervilliers, France
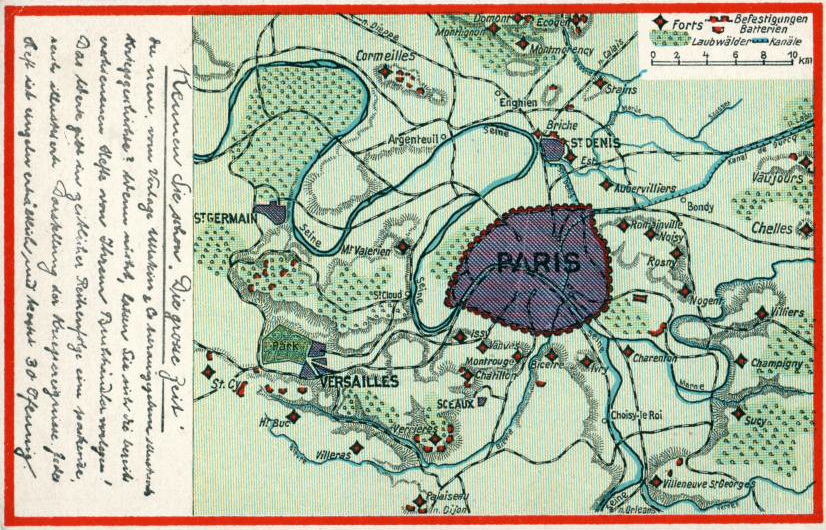
- German post card showing the fortifications of Paris

Site information
- Type: Fort
- Owner: Ministry of Defense
- Controlled by: France
- Condition: Occupied by Ministry of Defense, Gendarmerie Mobile

Location
- Coordinates: 48.91083°N 2.40611°E

Site history
- Built: 1842
- Battles/wars: Siege of Paris (1870-1871)

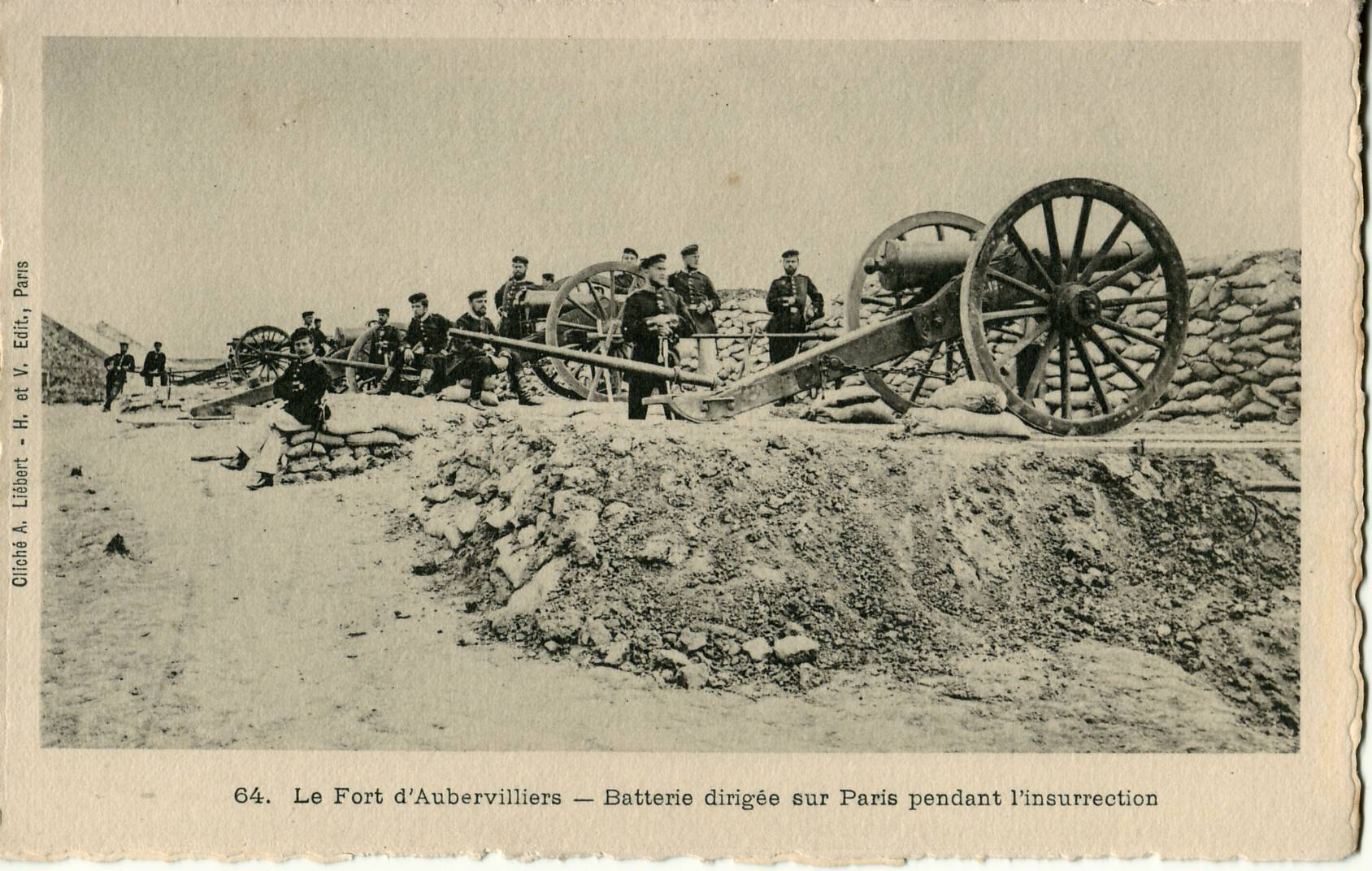
Prussian battery firing on Paris during the Paris Commune of 1871 from the Fort d'Aubervilliers

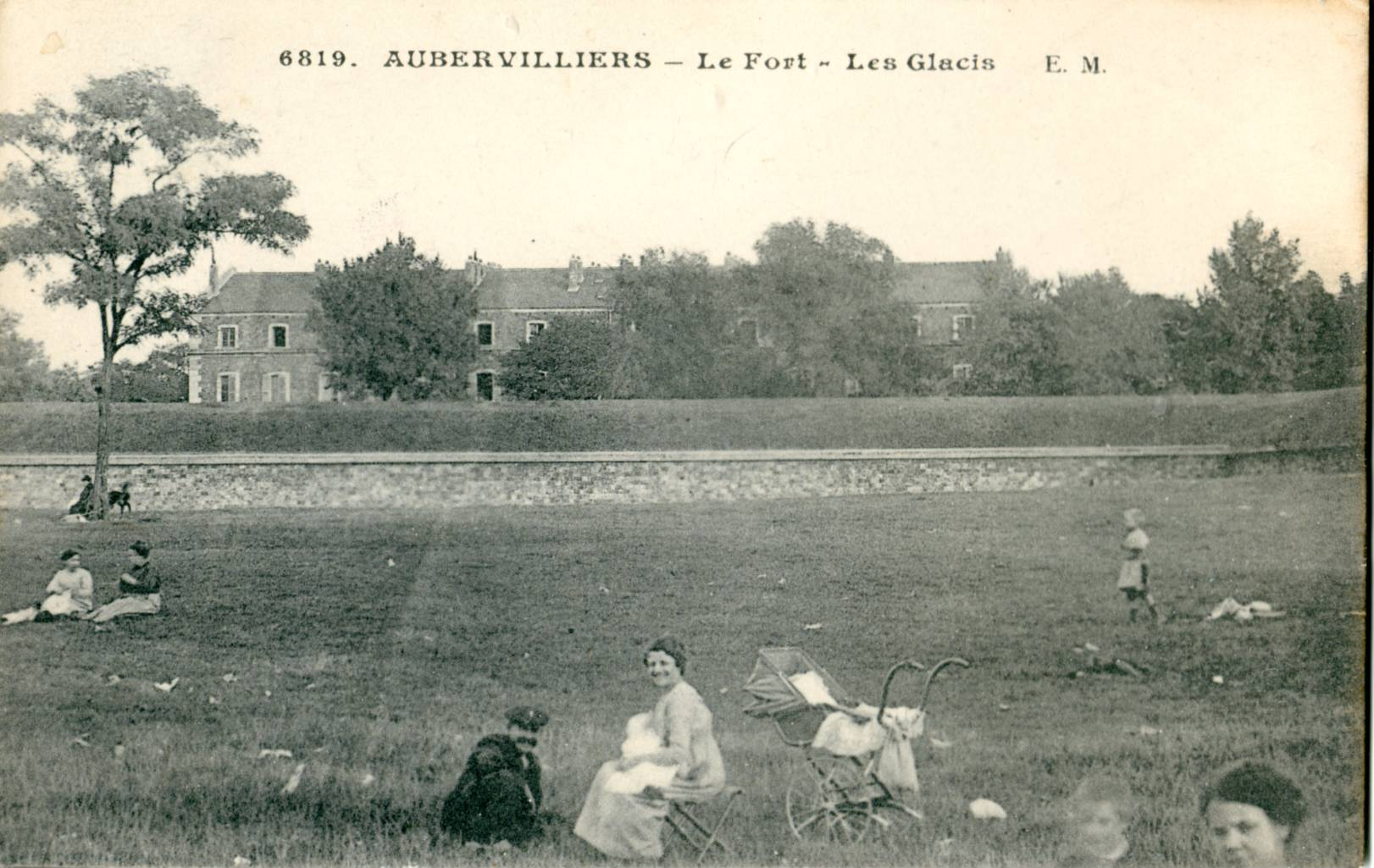
The glacis of Fort d'Aubervilliersat the beginning of the 20th century

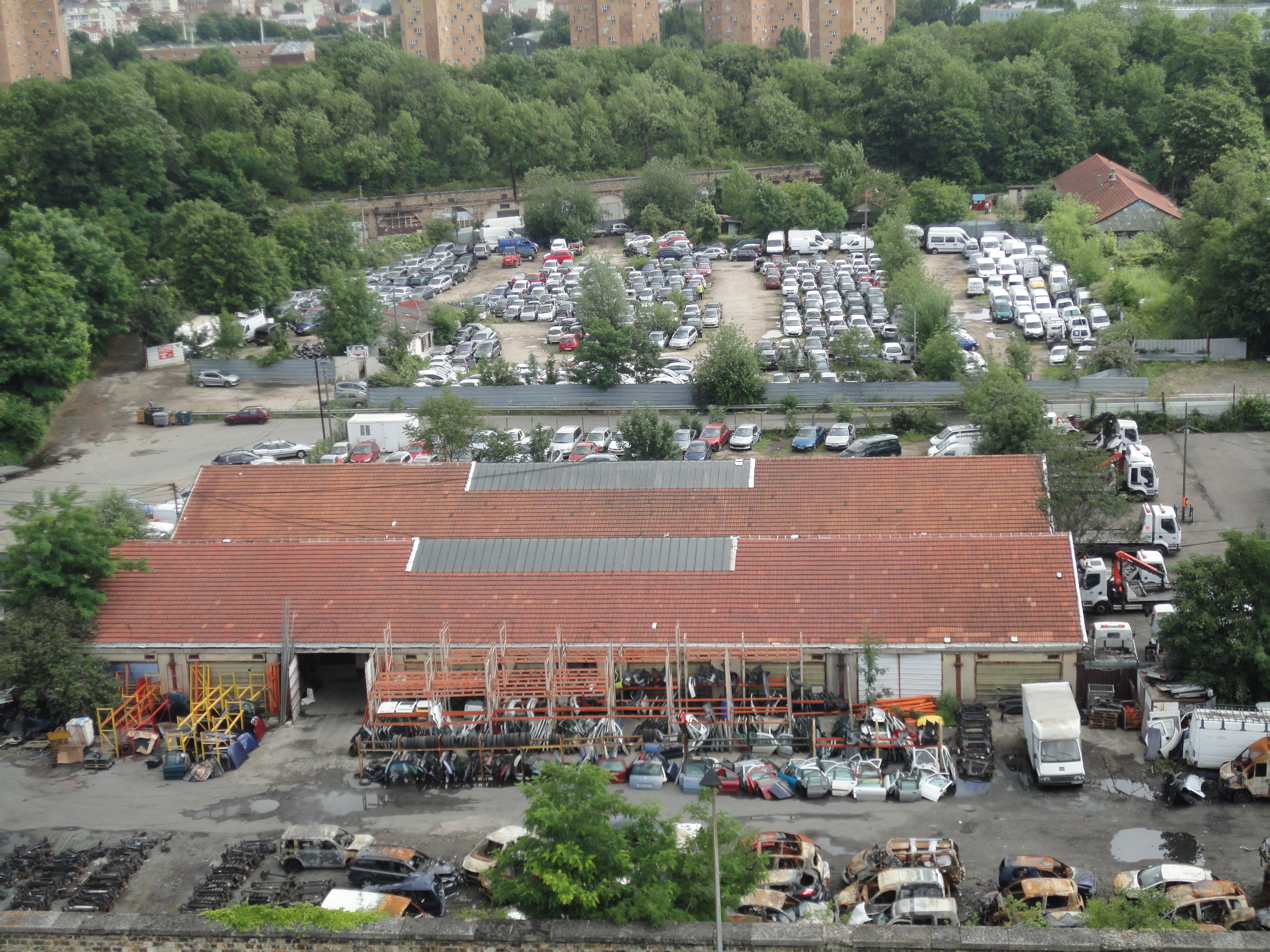
Aerial view of the automobile salvage yard on the fort site

The Fort d'Aubervilliers is a former fortification of Paris built for 1842 to 1846 in Aubervilliers to control the "route de Flandre", now Route nationale 2, to the northeast of Paris. The Fort d'Aubervilliers is part of the first ring of Paris fortifications outside the old city walls built by Adolphe Thiers in the 1840s to defend the capital against invasion and to control the city's rebellions.

== History ==
=== Early history ===
The Fort d'Aubervilliers formed part of a line of outlying forts surrounding the Thiers wall, which was begun as part of a program proposed in 1830 to fortify Paris. Property was acquired in 1841 and work began in 1842, with completion in 1846. The fort is pentagonal in shape with five bastions. Six casemates defend the main entry, with posterns on other faces. There are two sets of thirteen casemates on the side facing the front. Two original powder magazines were superseded by newer, better-protected magazines in 1874. The fort was used during the First World War as a workshop for the filling of toxic gas artillery shells by the French Army. The fort made the first phosgene shells used by the French Army starting in August 1915.

=== Radioactive contamination ===
Frédéric and Irène Joliot-Curie carried out studies on radioactivity at the Fort d'Aubervilliers during the 1920s and 1930s. The Curies worked with salts of radium 226. Later on experiments carried out by the army to support nuclear tests in Algeria caused serious contamination to the fort.

Decontamination started in 1990 by the Agence Nationale de gestion des Déchets Radioactifs (National Agency for Radioactive Waste Management) (ANDRA). 61 barrels with caesium-137 and radium-226 contamination are still stored at the fort, together with 60 cubic meters of contaminated soil. Dominique Voynet, former senator and minister of environmental affairs, stated that there were new areas of contamination on the site in 2006. An article in Le Parisien alleged that there were excess incidents of cancer in the area.

=== 1979–2012 ===
The Fort d'Aubervilliers is surrounded by garden allotments and adjoins the Cimetière de Pantin. It gives its name to the Fort d'Aubervillers station of Line 7 of the Paris Métro, opened in 1979. A barracks housing a unit of the Mobile Gendarmerie riot force uses the fort's entrance. Bartabas, a horse trainer and show presenter, has used the site since 1998 for presentations, with a horse ring, stage and restaurant on the site The rear part of the site is used as an automobile salvage yard.

== Projects ==
The fort site has been the subject of numerous studies for urban renewal, such as a new location for the Bichat–Claude Bernard Hospital or the construction of a velodrome, but the radioactive contamination problem has prevented action. Some land will be freed when the riot police detachment leaves the fort.

Architect Philippe Madec has proposed that about 2000 dwelling units be built on the site, to be built in 2015–2020. The fort's ditch is to be retained to provide a green space surrounding the development.
