= Corentin Cariou station =

Metro station in Paris, France

Corentin Cariou
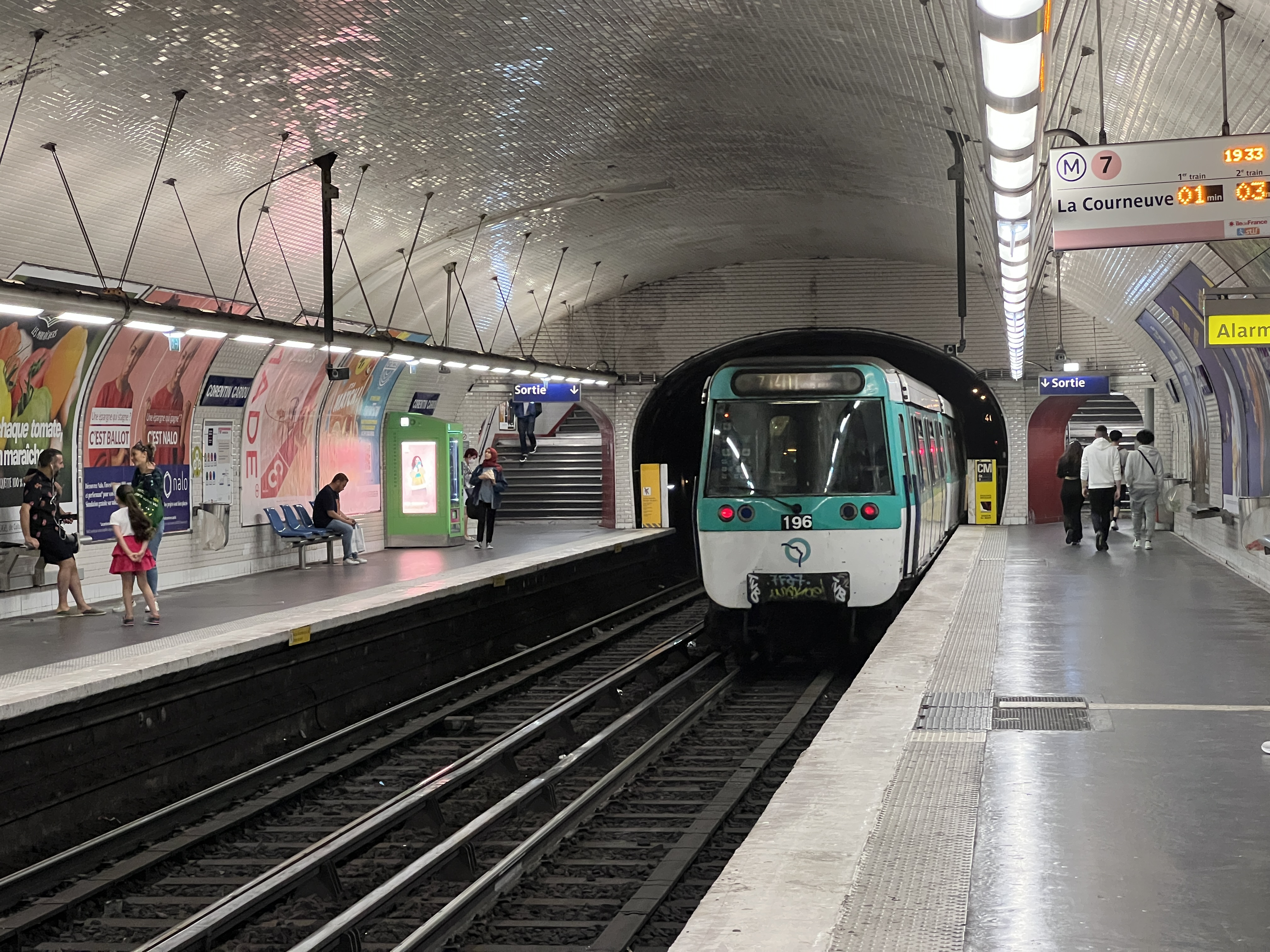

General information
- Location: 19th arrondissement of Paris; Île-de-France; France
- Coordinates: 48°53′40″N 2°22′54″E
- System: Paris Métro station
- Owner: RATP
- Operator: RATP
- Line: Paris Metro Paris Metro Line 7
- Platforms: 2 (2 side platforms)
- Tracks: 2

Other information
- Station code: 22-04
- Fare zone: 1

History
- Opened: 5 November 1910; 115 years ago
- Former names: Pont de Flandre

Passengers
- 1,329,810 (2020)

Services
Preceding station	Paris Metro	Following station
Crimée towards Villejuif–Louis Aragon or Mairie d'Ivry	Line 7	Porte de la Villette towards La Courneuve–8 mai 1945
Location
- Location within Paris

Corentin Cariou (French pronunciation: [kɔʁɑ̃tɛ̃ kaʁju]) is a station of the Paris Métro.

== History ==
Corentin Cariou opened on 5 November 1910 with the commissioning of the first section of line 7 between Opéra and Porte de la Villette with service provided by all trains on the line until 18 January 1911, when a branch opened from Louis Blanc to Pré-Saint-Gervais, resulting in 1 of every 2 trains serving this branch. It was once again served by all trains on the line when the branch from Louis Blanc to Pré-Saint-Gervais was split to form an independent line, line 7bis, on 3 December 1967.

It was originally named Pont de Flandre, after the nearby bridge spanning the Canal de Saint-Denis on which the rue de Flandre ran on, the main road in La Villette. On 10 February 1946, the station was renamed after Corentin Cariou (1898–1942) who was a member of the municipal council of the 19th arrondissement and was shot by the Nazis during the occupation as a hostage. It is one of 8 stations which were renamed after resistance fighters who had died for France, the others being Charles Michels (line 10), Colonel Fabien (line 2), Corentin Celton (line 12), Guy Môquet (line 13), Jacques Bonsergent (line 5), Marx Dormoy (line 12), and Trinité - d'Estienne d'Orves (line 12).

In 1982, the station was decorated with an artwork by the French artist Hervé Mathieu-Bachelot, De la verticale à l'oblique, consisting of a fresco that line the sides of the corridors.

As part of the "Un métro + beau" programme by the RATP, the station was renovated and modernised on 23 November 2001.

In 2019, the station was used by 2,766,678 passengers, making it the 191st busiest of the Métro network out of 302 stations.

In 2020, the station was used by 1,329,810 passengers amidst the COVID-19 pandemic, making it the 196th busiest of the Métro network out of 305 stations.

== Passenger services ==
=== Access ===
The station has 2 entrances:

- Entrance 1: rue Benjamin-Constant
- Entrance 2: Avenue Corentin-Cariou - Cité des sciences et de l'industrie

=== Station layout ===
Street Level
B1	Mezzanine
Line 7 platforms	Side platform, doors will open on the right
Line 7 platforms	Southbound	← toward Villejuif – Louis Aragon or Mairie d'Ivry (Crimée)
Line 7 platforms	Northbound	toward La Courneuve–8 mai 1945 (Porte de la Villette) →
Line 7 platforms	Side platform, doors will open on the right

=== Platforms ===
Corentin Cariou has a standard configuration with two tracks surrounded by two side platforms, although the lower part of the walls are vertical instead of a typical elliptical shape. The decoration is in the style used for the majority of metro stations. The bevelled white ceramic tiles cover the walls, vault and tunnel exits, and lighting canopy is provided by two tube bands. The advertising frames are metallic and the name of the station is inscribed in Parisine font on enamelled plates. The seats are white 'Motte' style.

=== Other connections ===
The station is also served by lines 60 and 71 of the RATP bus network and at night, by N42 of the Noctilien bus network.

== Gallery ==
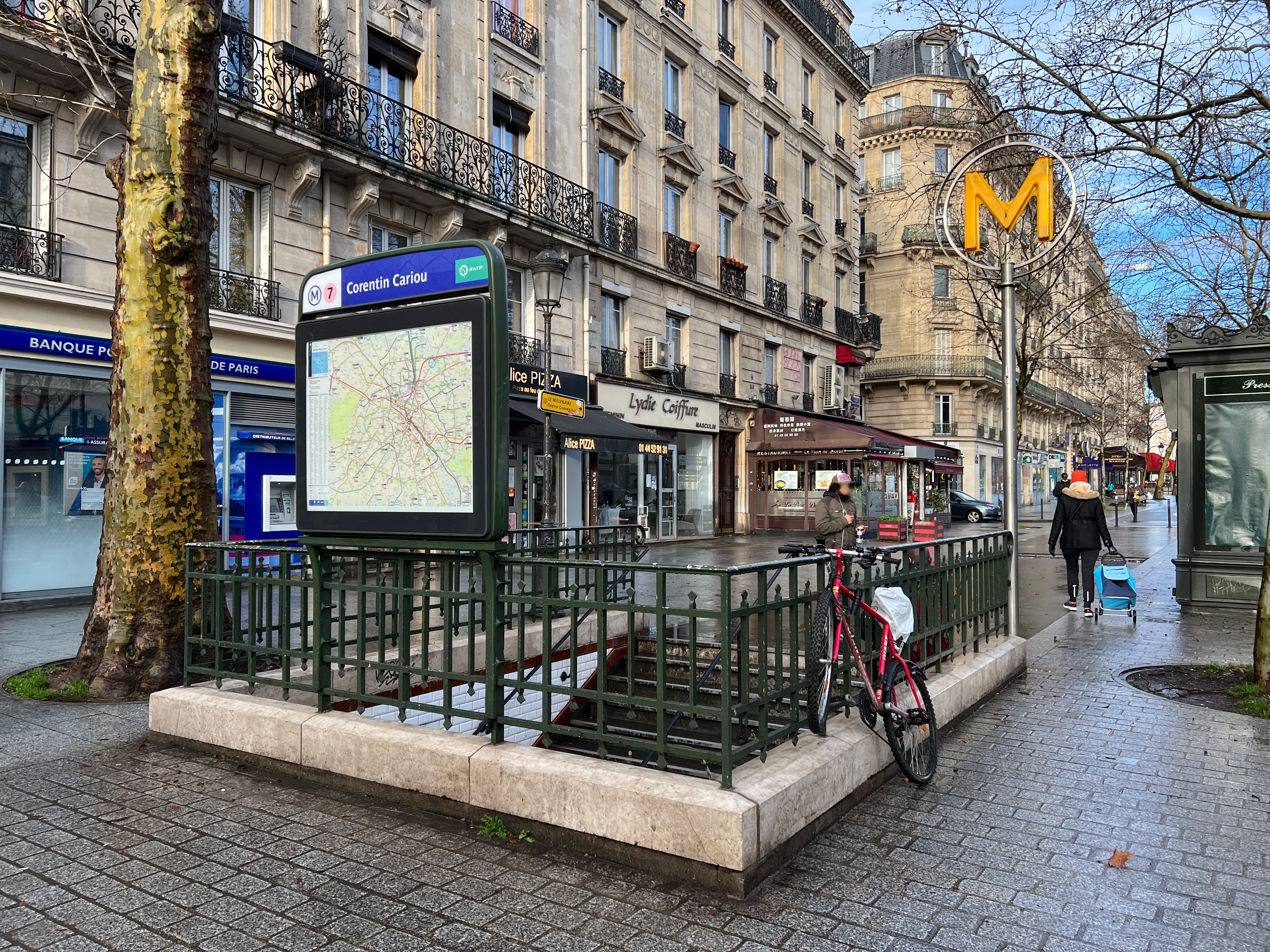
Entrance 1
