= Fort d'Aubervilliers station =

Metro station in Paris, France

Fort d'Aubervilliers
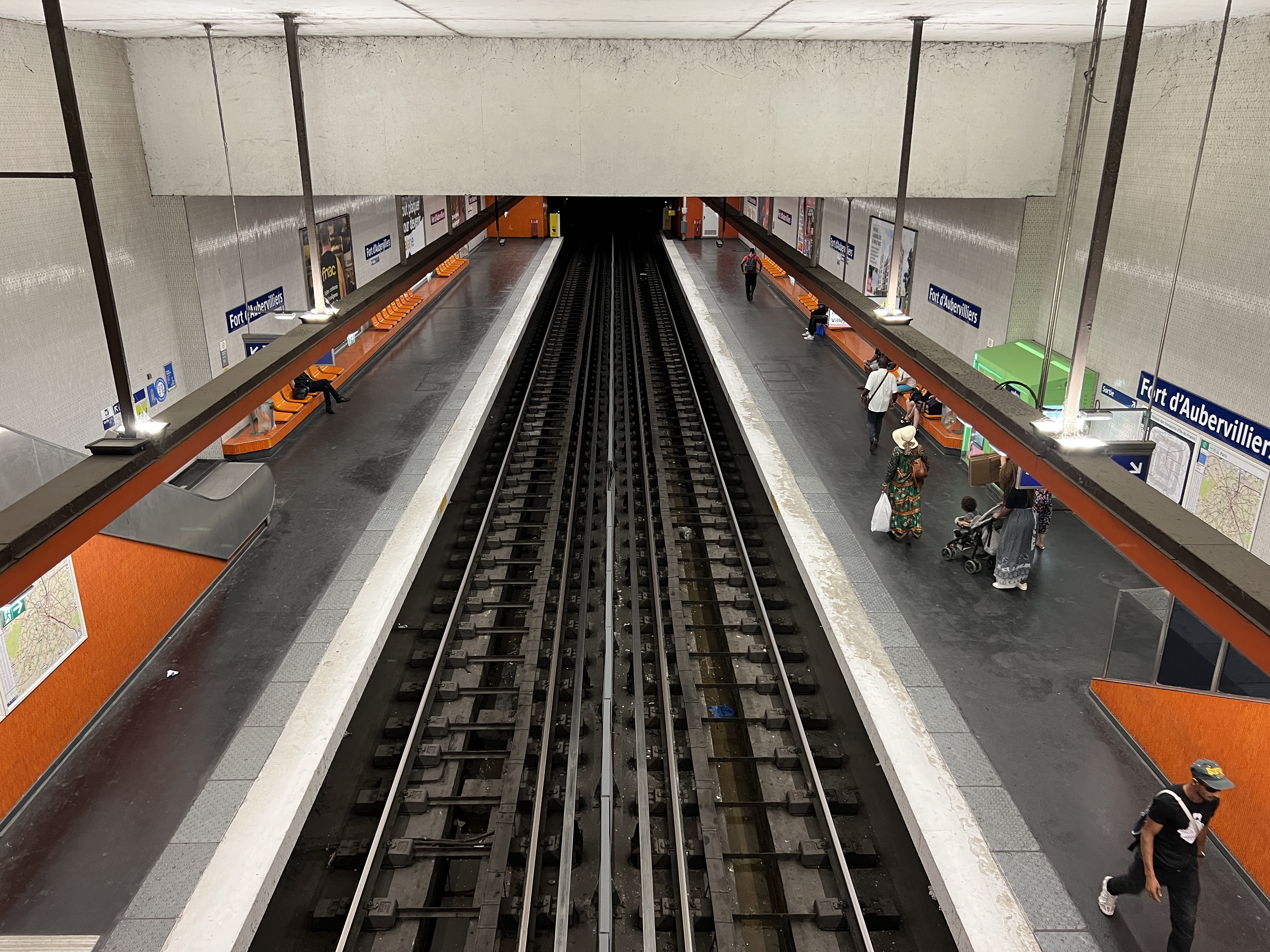
- Fort Aubervilliers Platforms

General information
- Location: Aubervilliers; Île-de-France; France
- Coordinates: 48°54′51″N 2°24′14″E
- System: Paris Métro station
- Owner: RATP
- Operator: RATP
- Line: Paris Metro Paris Metro Line 7
- Platforms: 2 (2 side platforms)
- Tracks: 2

Construction
- Depth: 26 m (Line 15)
- Architect: Grimshaw Architects (Line 15)

Other information
- Station code: 0306
- Fare zone: 2

History
- Opened: 4 October 1979; 46 years ago

Passengers
- 2,328,764 (2020)

Services
| Preceding station | Paris Metro | Following station |
|---|---|---|
| Aubervilliers–Pantin–Quatre Chemins towards Villejuif–Louis Aragon or Mairie d'Ivry | Line 7 | La Courneuve–8 mai 1945 Terminus |
Location
- Location within Paris and inner ring

Fort d'Aubervilliers (French pronunciation: [fɔʁ dobɛʁvilje]) is a station of the Paris Métro. It is named after the old Fort d'Aubervilliers, one of the 16 forts built between 1841 and 1845 as the first belt of defence at a cannonball's distance outside Paris' 19th century wall.

== History ==
The station opened on 4 October 1979 following an extension from Porte de la Villette.

The station served as the temporary terminus of the line until the opening of the second stage of the extension, to La Courneuve - 8 May 1945, which opened in 1987.

In 2019, the station was used by 3,889,085 passengers, making it the 123rd busiest of the Métro network out of 302 stations.

In 2020, the station was used by 2,328,764 passengers amidst the COVID-19 pandemic, making it the 98th busiest of the Métro network out of 305 stations.

As of 2021, preparatory work on line 15's station is scheduled to start later in the year till 2023 with construction scheduled to start in late 2024, with a planned opening in 2030 as part of line 15 east.

== Passenger services ==
=== Access ===
The station has 4 entrances on Avenue de la Division Leclerc and Avenue Jean Jaurès.

=== Station layout ===
Street Level

| B1 | Mezzanine for platform connection |

| Line 7 platforms | Side platform, doors will open on the right |
| Line 7 platforms | Southbound | ← toward Villejuif – Louis Aragon or Mairie d'Ivry (Aubervilliers – Pantin – Quatre Chemins) |
| Line 7 platforms | Northbound | toward La Courneuve–8 mai 1945 (Terminus) → |
| Line 7 platforms | Side platform, doors will open on the right |

=== Platforms ===
Fort d'Aubervilliers has a standard configuration with 2 tracks surrounded by 2 side platforms. The name of the station is written in Parisine font on enamelled plates. The platforms are devoid of seats and advertisements.

=== Other connections ===
The station is also served by lines 152, 173, 234, 248, 250, and 330 of the RATP bus network and by line 609 of the TRA bus network on Sundays and public holidays. At night, the station is served by the line N42 of the Noctilien bus network.

== Gallery ==
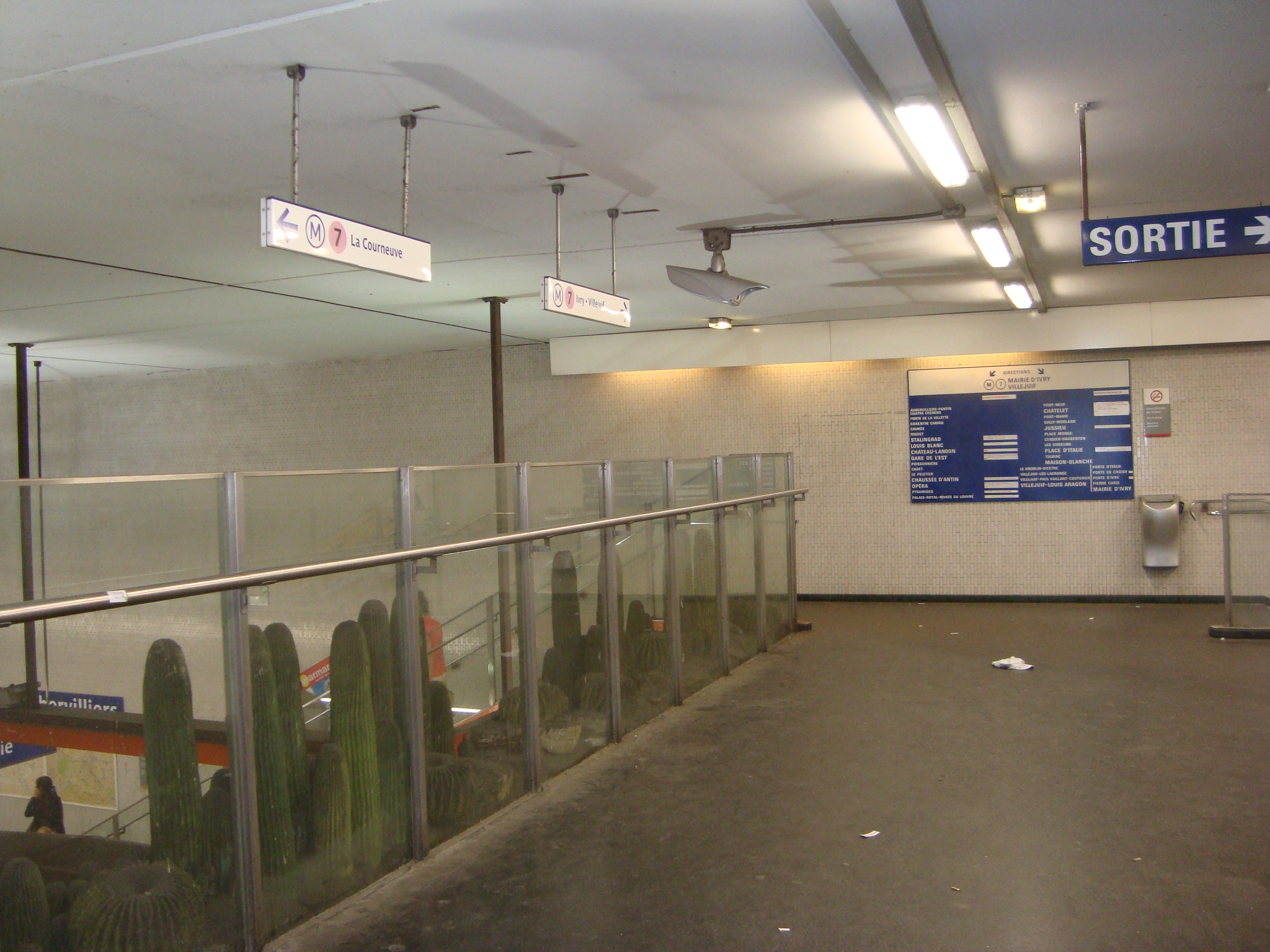
Cacti on the mezzanine at Fort d'Aubervilliers

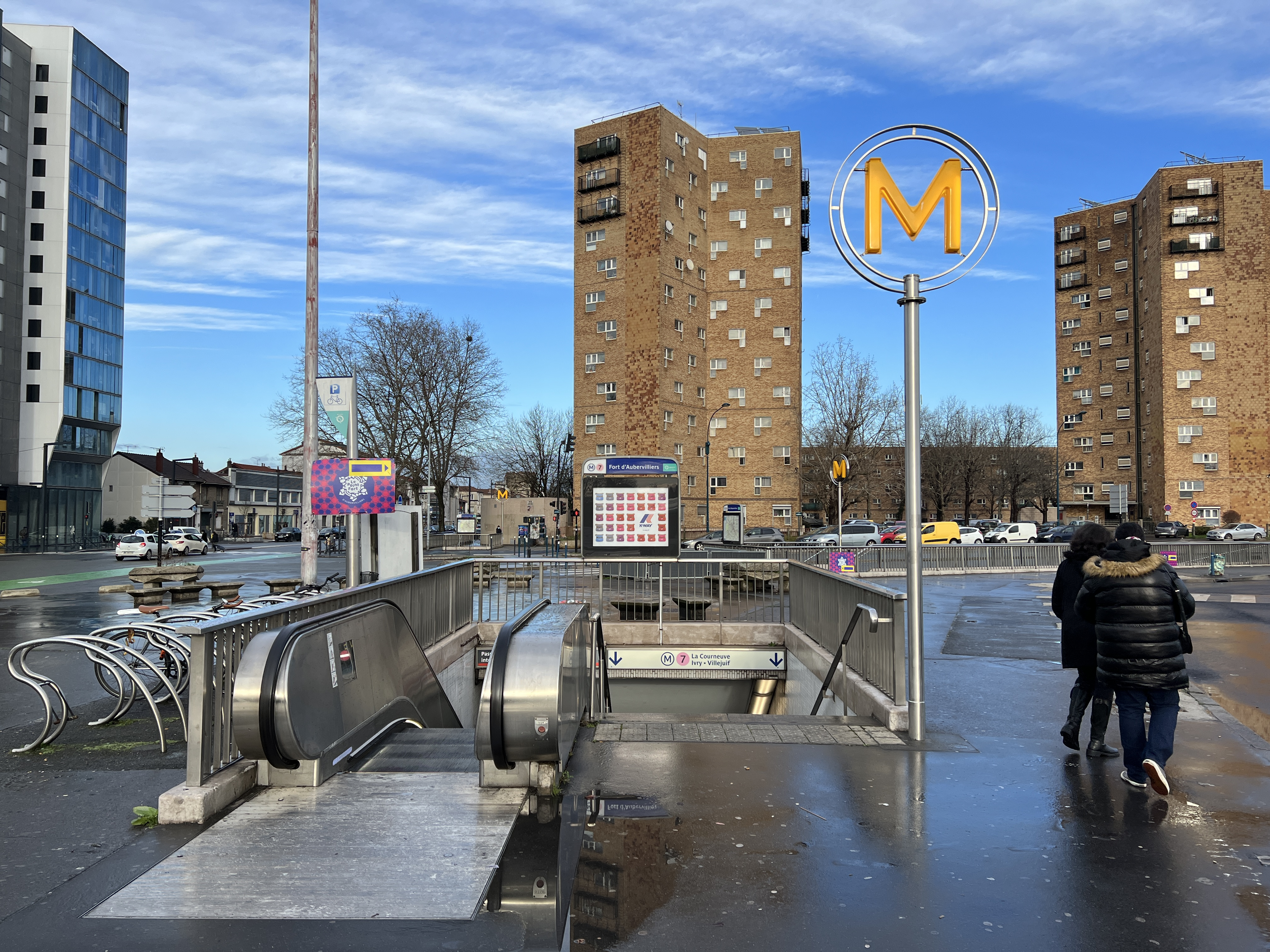
Entrance on avenue de la Division Leclerc
