= La Courneuve–8 mai 1945 station =

Metro station in Paris, France

La Courneuve–8 mai 1945
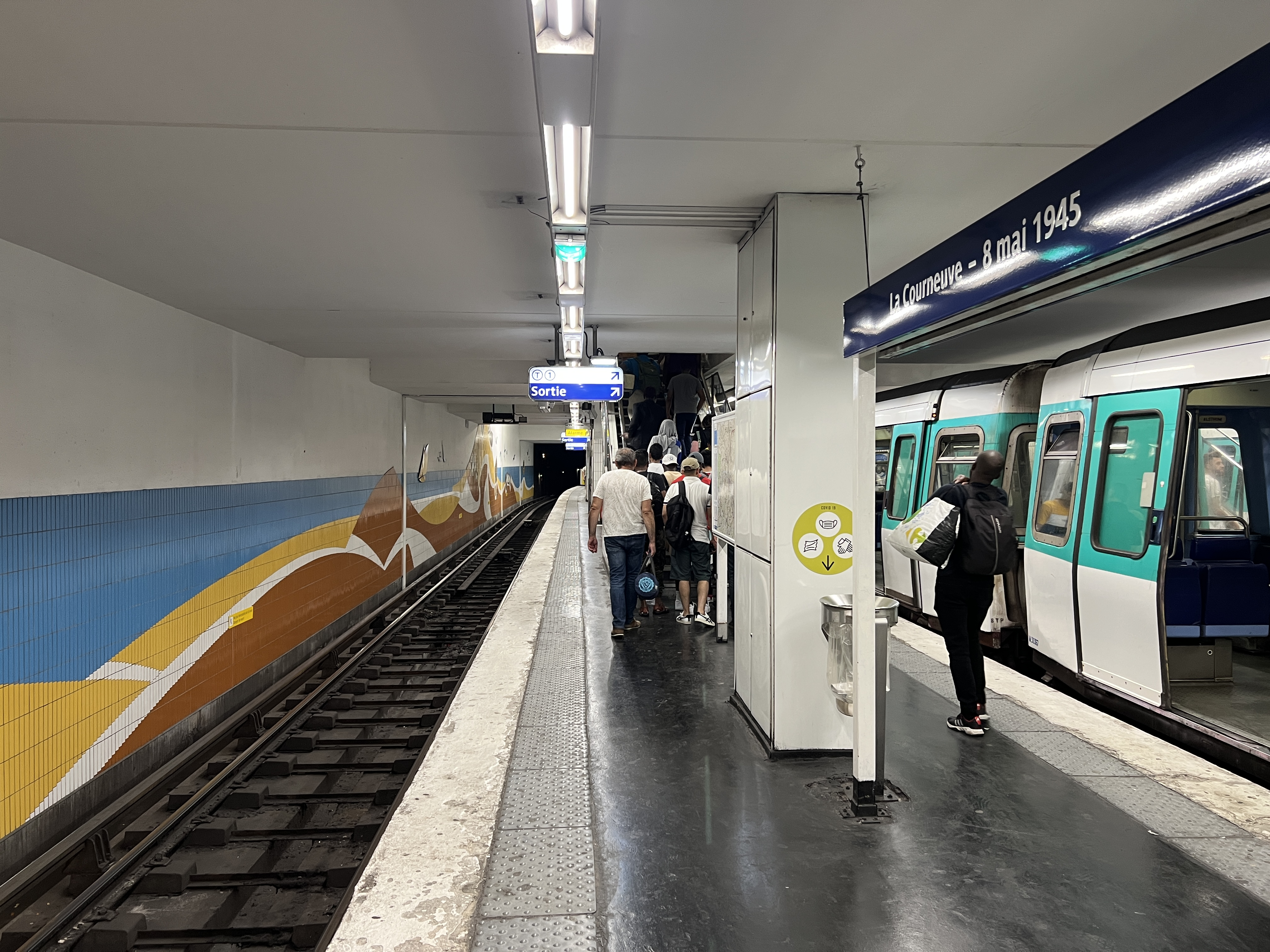
- 2 MF 77 at La Courneuve–8 mai 1945

General information
- Location: La Courneuve, Seine-Saint-Denis; Île-de-France; France
- Coordinates: 48°55′15″N 2°24′38″E
- System: Paris Métro station
- Owner: RATP
- Operator: RATP
- Line: Paris Metro Paris Metro Line 7
- Platforms: 2 (2 island platforms)
- Tracks: 3

Other information
- Station code: 0307
- Fare zone: 2

History
- Opened: 6 May 1987; 39 years ago

Passengers
- 3,611,264 (2020)

Services
Preceding station	Paris Metro	Following station
Fort d'Aubervilliers towards Villejuif–Louis Aragon or Mairie d'Ivry	Line 7	Terminus
Preceding station	Tram	Following station
Danton towards Asnières–Quatre Routes	T1	Maurice Lachâtre towards Noisy-le-Sec
Location
- Location within Paris and inner ring

La Courneuve–8 mai 1945 (French pronunciation: [la kuʁnœv ɥit mɛ milnœfsɑ̃kaʁɑ̃tsɛ̃k]) is a station of the Paris Métro and serves as the northern terminus of Paris Métro Line 7.

== History ==
La Courneuve–8 mai 1945 was inaugurated on 6 May 1987 following an extension from Fort d'Aubervilliers and was renovated in 2005. The term "8 mai 1945" in its name refers to VE Day, or the end of World War II in Europe on 8 May 1945.

In 2019, the station was used by 5,886,507 passengers making it the 63rd busiest of the Métro network out of 302 stations.

In 2020, the station was used by 3,611,264 passengers amidst the COVID-19 pandemic, making it the 39th busiest of the Métro network out of 305 stations.

== Passenger services ==
=== Access ===
The station has 4 entrances:

- Access 1: Stade Daniel Féry
- Access 2: avenue Jean Jaurès
- Access 3: avenue Paul Vaillant Couturier
- Access 4: avenue Lénine

=== Station layout ===
Street Level

B1	Mezzanine

Line 7 platforms	Southbound	← toward Villejuif–Louis Aragon or Mairie d'Ivry (Fort d'Aubervilliers)
Line 7 platforms	Island platform, doors will open on the left, right
Line 7 platforms	Southbound	← toward Villejuif–Louis Aragon or Mairie d'Ivry (Fort d'Aubervilliers)
Line 7 platforms	Island platform, doors will open on the left
Line 7 platforms	Northbound	Alighting passengers only →

=== Platforms ===
The station has a particular arrangement specific to the stations serving or had served as a terminus. It has three tracks and two island platforms with its walls decorated with tiling depicting scenes of sunrises and sunsets at the seaside.

=== Other connections ===
Since 6 July 1992, the station has been served by tramway T1, and before the extension to Gare de Saint-Denis on 15 December 1992, was its western terminus. From 2016 to the summer of 2017, the tram station was renovated along with the lengthening of the platforms and modernisation of its associated shelters to cater for the anticipated increase in traffic when further extensions to the line opens in Rueil-Malmaison and Fontenay-sous-Bois in the future.

It is also served by with bus lines 152 and 173 of the RATP bus network, by lines 607, 609, and 611 of the TRA bus network, and at night, by line N42 of the Noctilien bus network.

== Tourism ==
Although it is not very tourist-oriented, the neighbourhood "Quatre routes" is very commercialized, featuring a large market which is open on Tuesdays, Fridays and Sunday mornings. To reach the nearby Parc départemental de La Courneuve, the largest green space in the département (approximately 4 km^{2}), take the T1 to the station "Six routes". During the Fête de l'Humanité at the beginning of September, a shuttle takes people directly there from the terminus of the métro.

It is also possible to take the T1 towards Drancy in order to visit the deportation camp of the Cité de la Muette.

Bus 152 arrives at the station from the Musée de l'Air et de l'Espace (The Museum of Air and Space) at Le Bourget Airport, where a biennial aviation show is held.

== Gallery ==
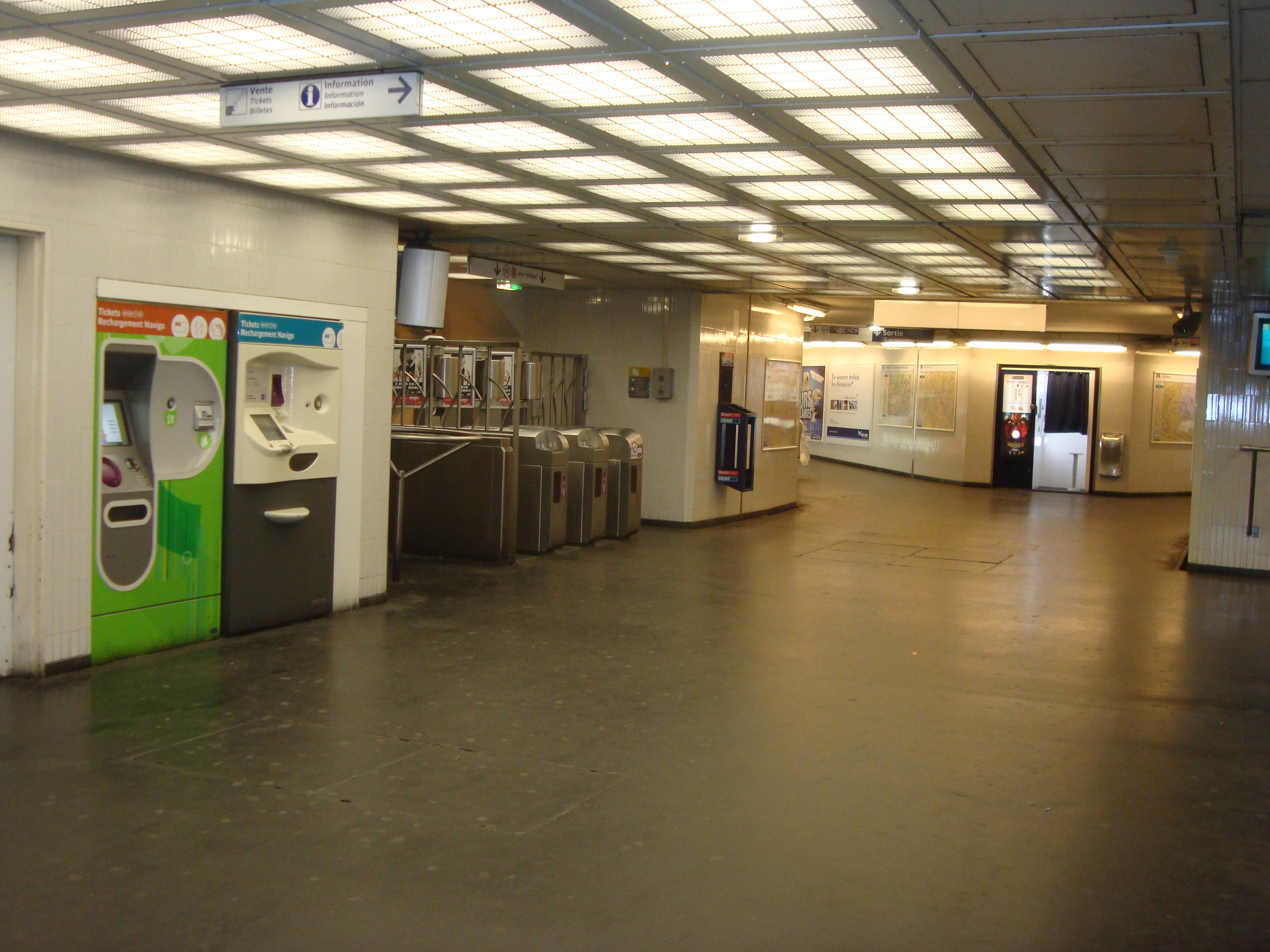
La Courneuve–8 Mai 1945 ticket hall

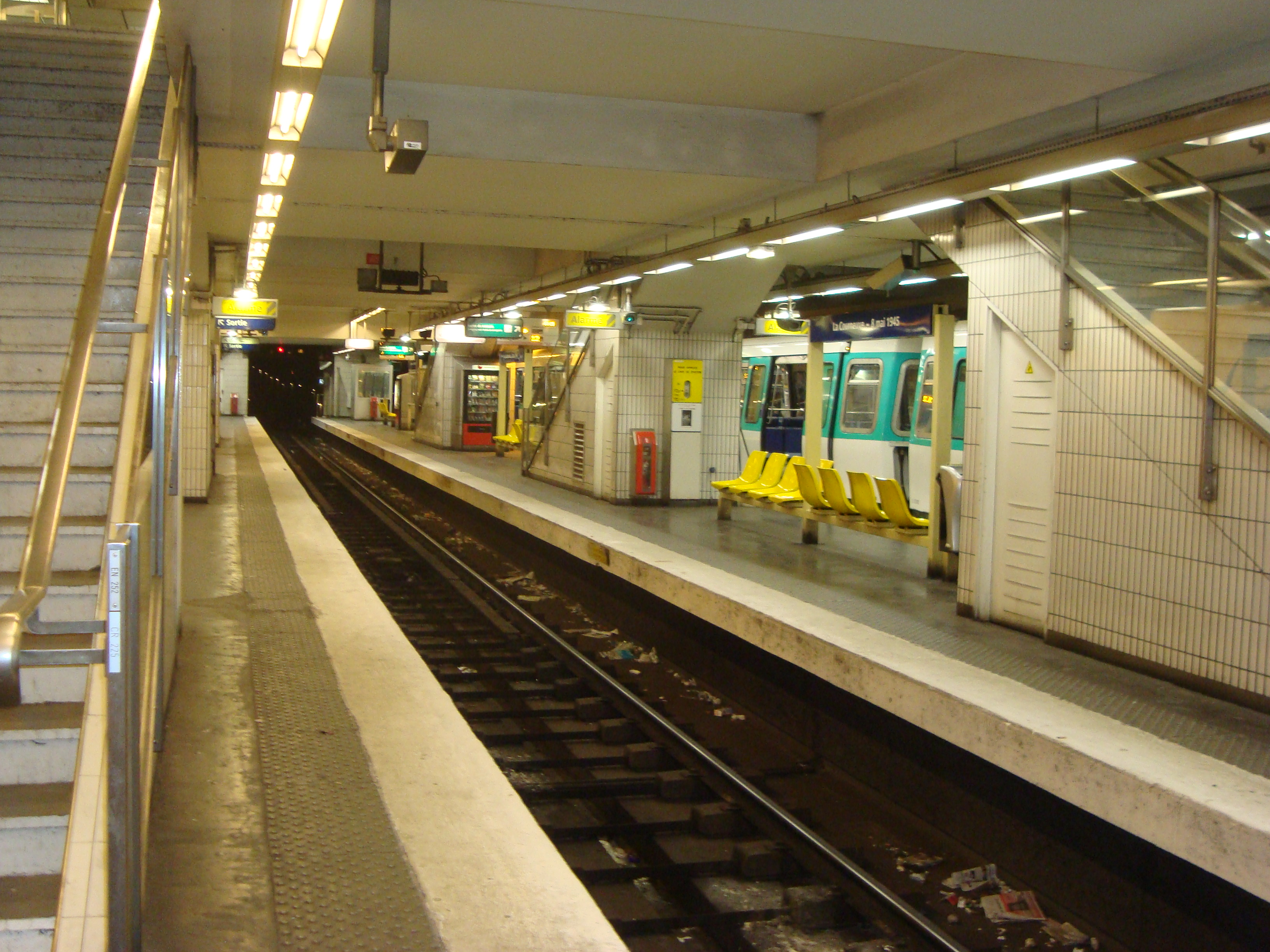
Platform facing the centre track

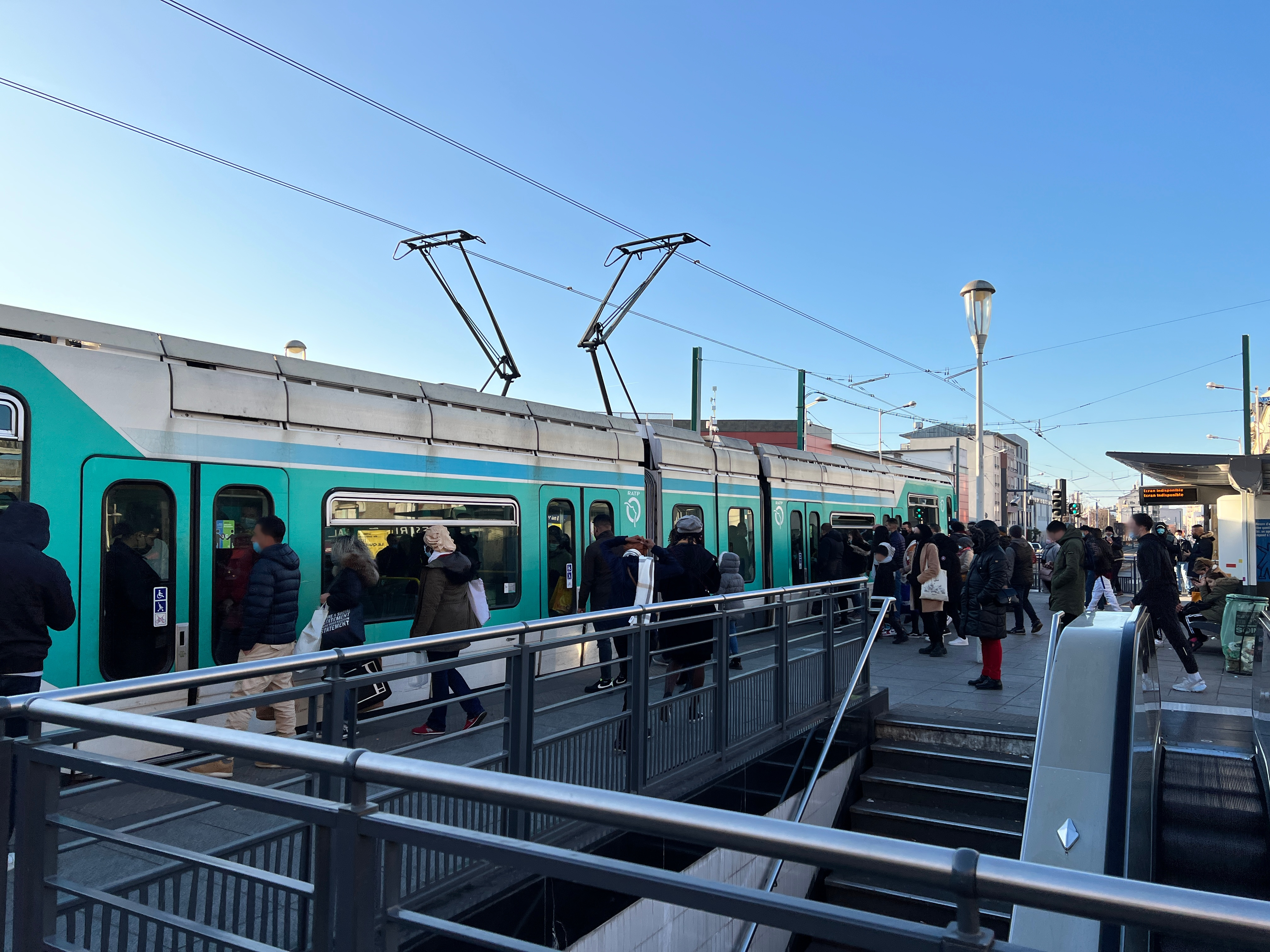
Renovated T1 station at La Courneuve–8 Mai 1945 (2021)

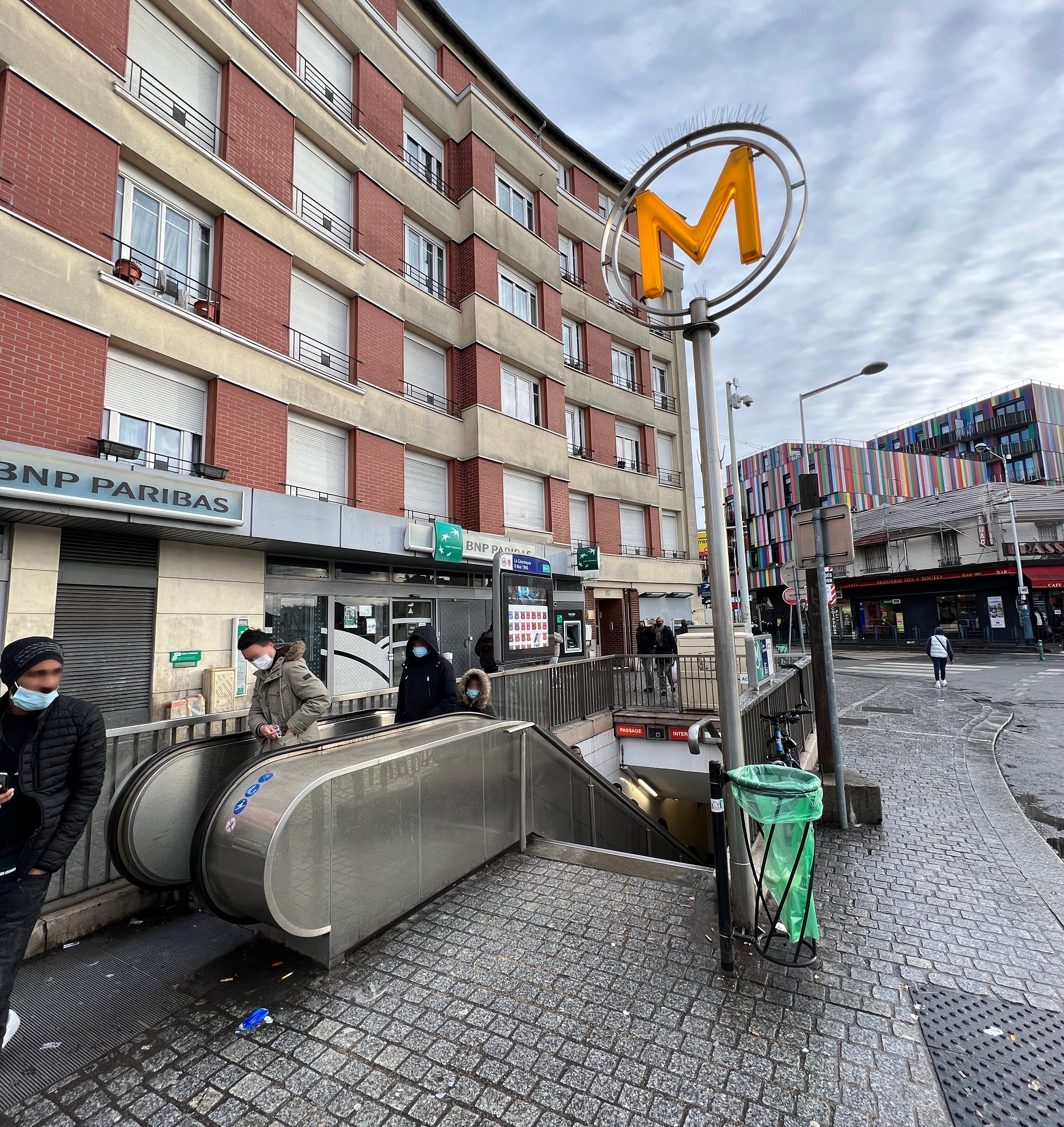
Entrance 1

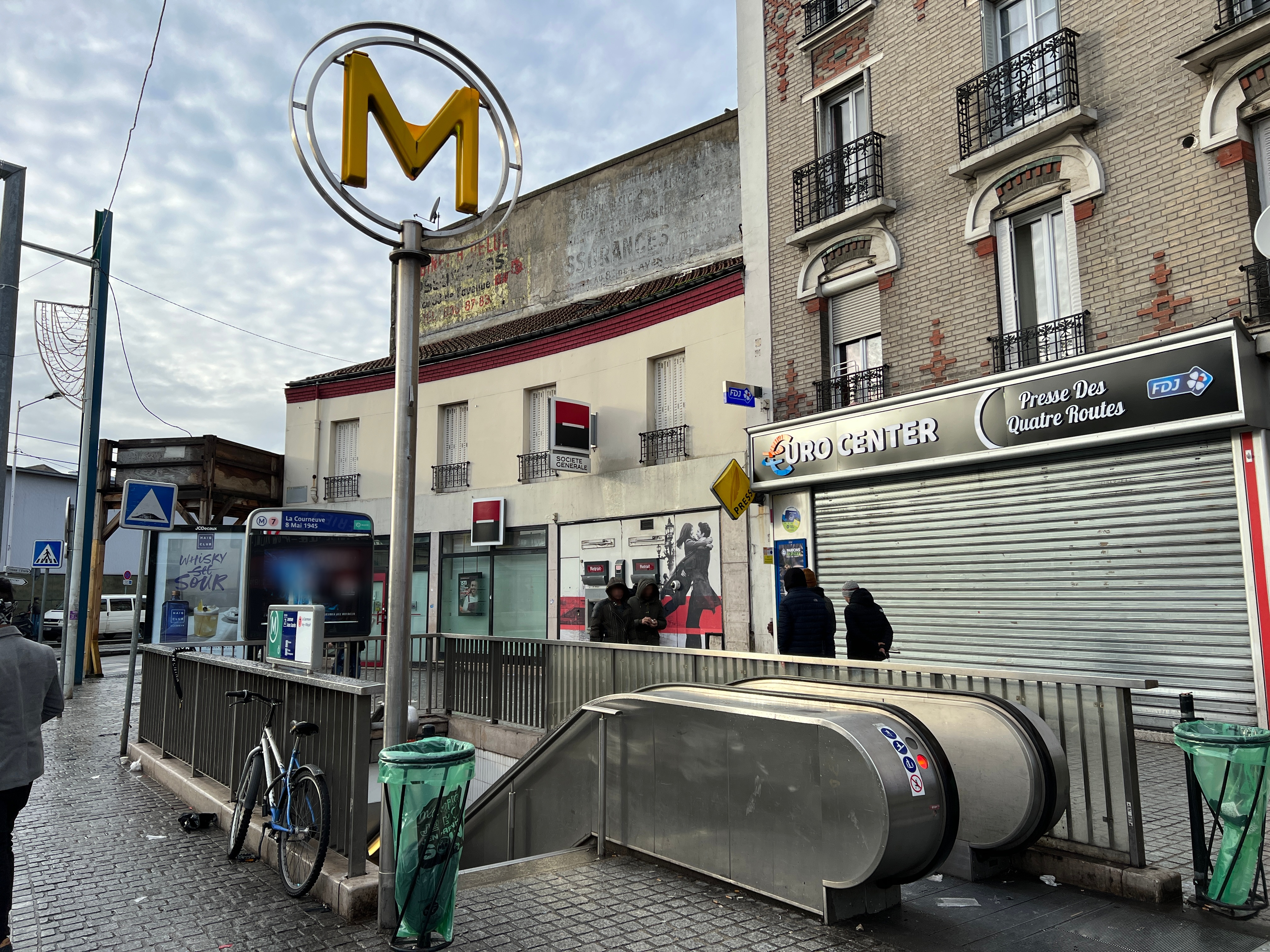
Entrance 2

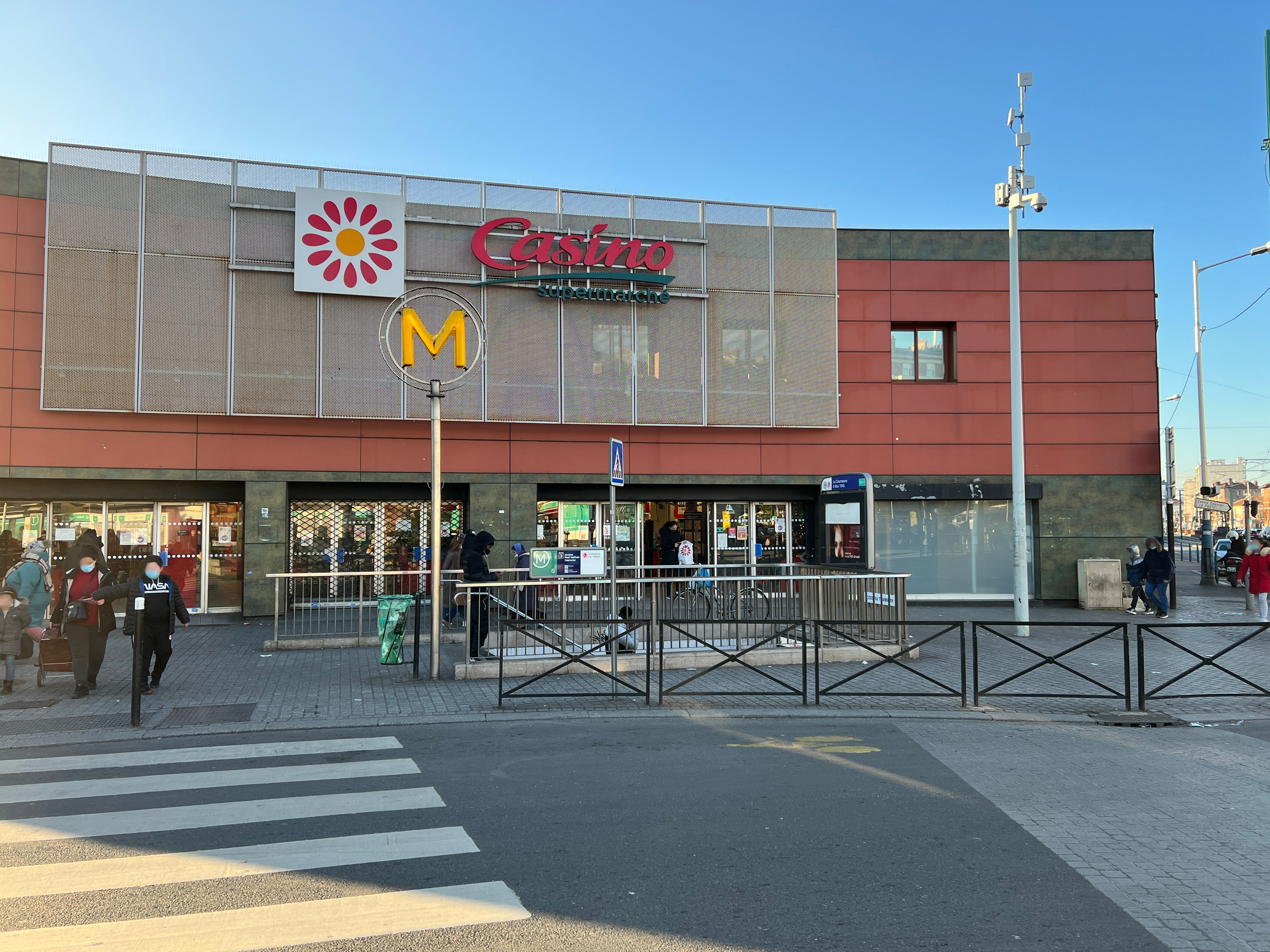
Entrance 3

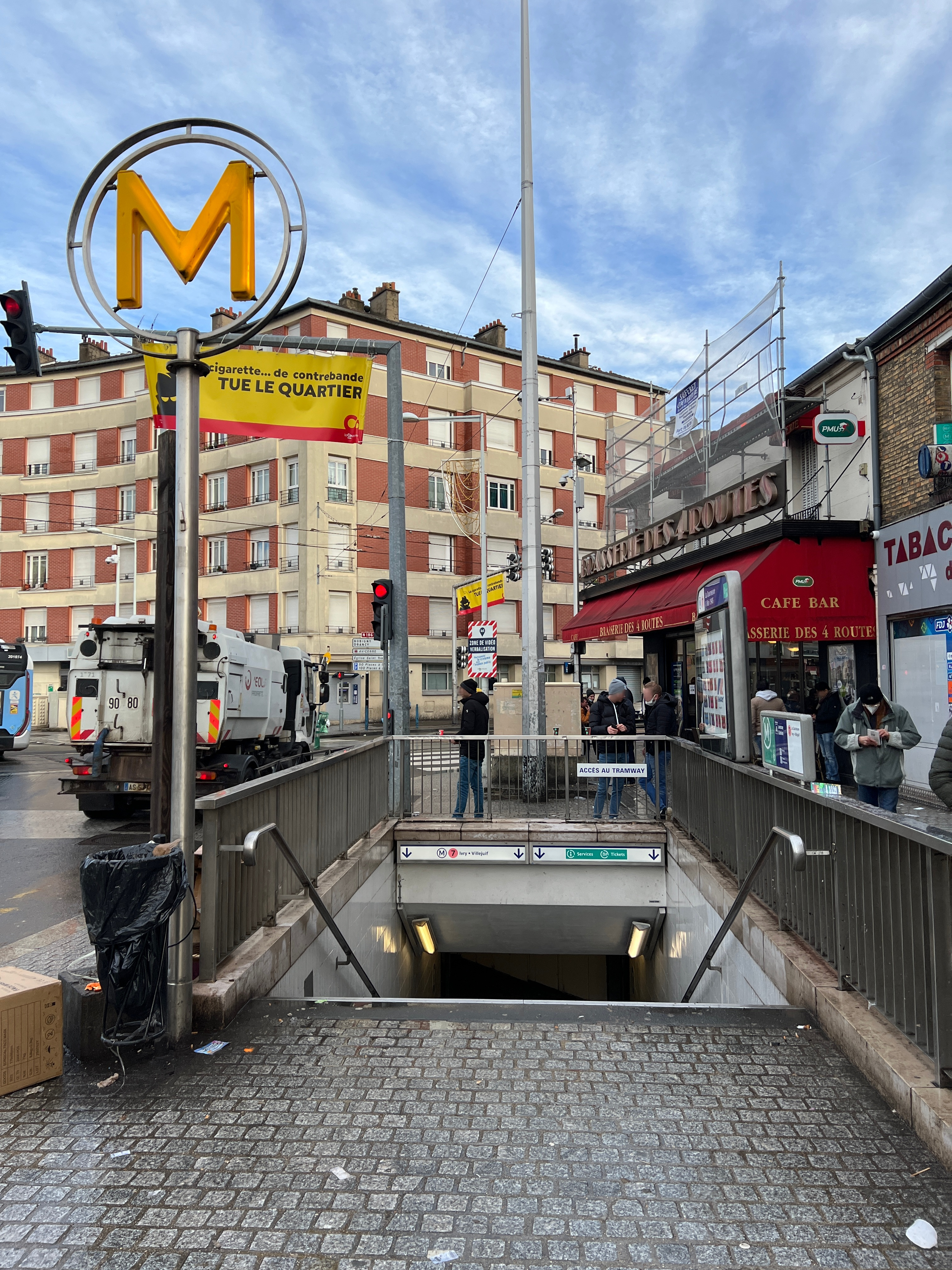
Entrance 4

== See also ==
- La Courneuve
- List of stations of the Paris Métro
