= Porte d'Italie station =

Metro station in Paris, France

Porte d'Italie
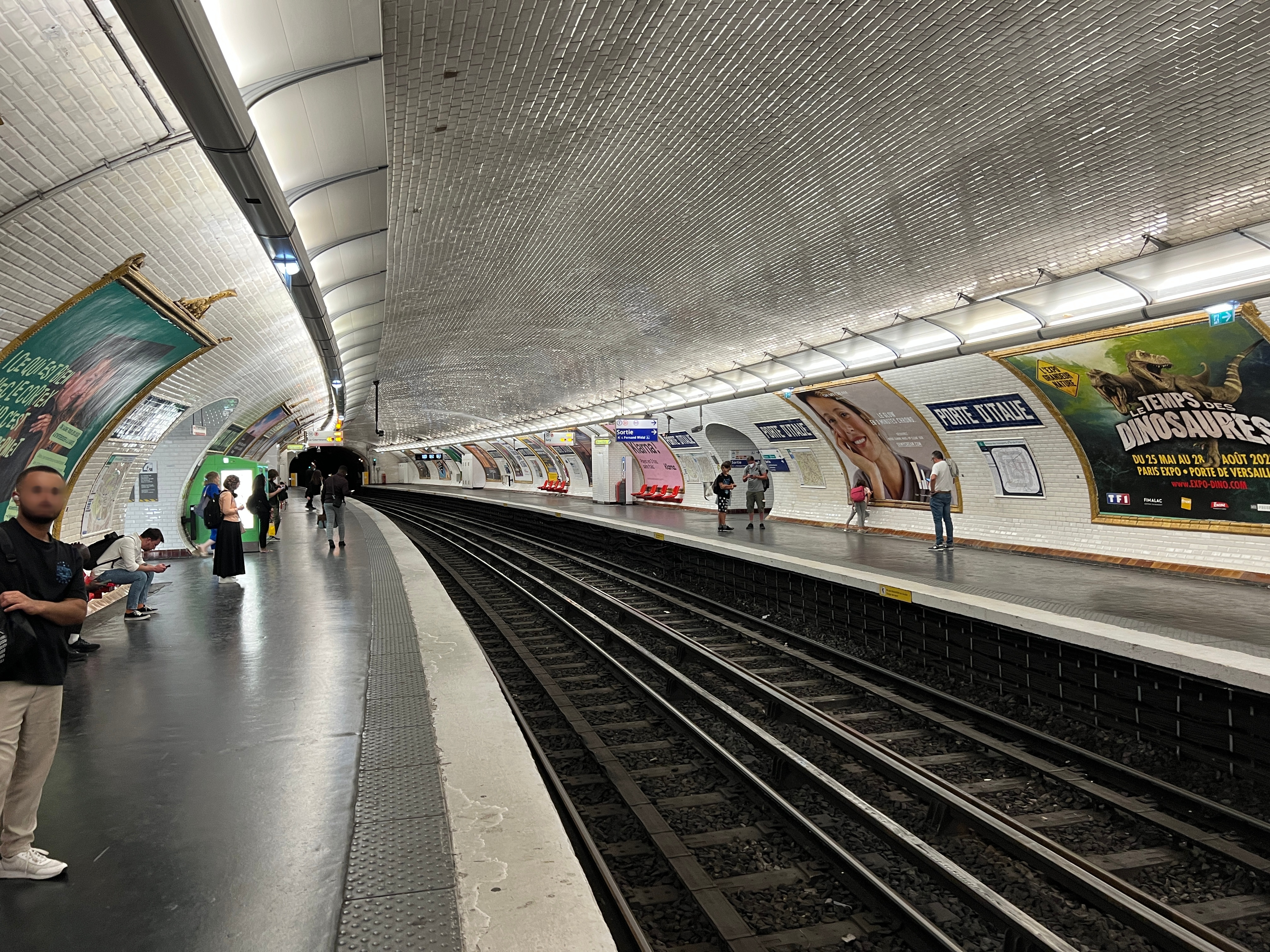
- Platforms

General information
- Location: 13th arrondissement of Paris; Île-de-France; France
- Coordinates: 48°49′09″N 2°21′39″E
- System: Paris Métro station
- Owner: RATP
- Operator: RATP
- Line: Paris Metro Paris Metro Line 7
- Platforms: 2 (2 side platforms)
- Tracks: 2

Construction
- Accessible: no

Other information
- Station code: 14-03
- Fare zone: 1

History
- Opened: 7 March 1930; 96 years ago

Passengers
- 1,507,152 (2021)

Services
Preceding station	Paris Metro	Following station
Porte de Choisy towards Mairie d'Ivry	Line 7 Ivry branch	Maison Blanche towards La Courneuve–8 mai 1945
Location
- Location within Paris

Porte d'Italie (French pronunciation: [pɔʁt ditali]) is a station on Line 7 of the Paris Métro, and a stop on tramway T3a in the 13th arrondissement. It is named after the Porte d'Italie, a gate in the 19th century Thiers wall of Paris, which led to the south and Italy.

== History ==
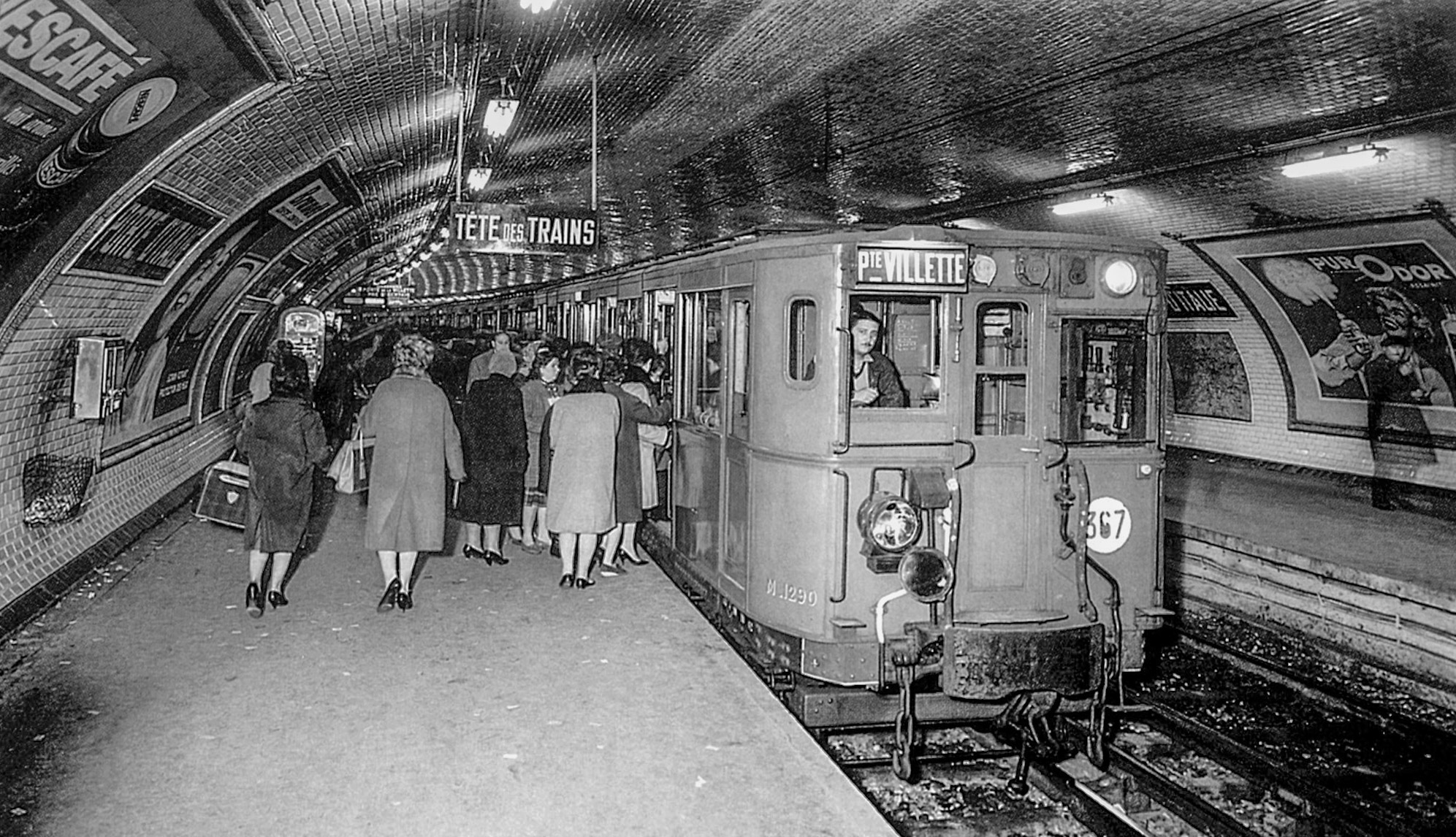
A Sprague-Thomson at the station, circa 1960

The station opened on 7 March 1930 as part of line 10's extension from Place d'Italie to Porte de Choisy. On 26 April 1931, it was transferred to line 7. Along with Porte de Bagnolet (line 3), Porte Dorée (line 8), and Porte de Pantin (line 5), it is one of four stations built at the former gates of Paris without having been a terminus.

On 23 March 1973, a carriage of an MF 67 train caught fire, causing it to be completely destroyed and damaging part of the station. The release of toxic fumes intoxicated two passengers.

The service, then provided by all trains on the line, is now only provided by one out of every two trains when a second branch to Le Kremlin–Bicêtre (now further extended to Villejuif–Louis Aragon) opened on 10 December 1982.

As part of the "Un métro + beau" programme by the RATP, the station's corridors and platform lighting were renovated and modernised on 12 January 2005.

On 6 September 2014, a knife fight between two passengers on a train continued after alighting at the station at around 6 am, with one of them stabbed at the side. A cleaner at the station was also injured.

In 2019, the station was used by 2,363,639 passengers, making it the 218th busiest of the Métro network out of 302 stations.

In 2020, the station was used by 1,458,709 passengers amidst the COVID-19 pandemic, making it the 180th busiest of the Métro network out of 304 stations.

In 2021, the station was used by 1,507,152 passengers, making it the 235th busiest of the Métro network out of 304 stations.

== Passenger services ==
=== Access ===
The station has four accesses:

- Access 1: Square Hélène-Boucher (two staircases)
- Access 2: Boulevard Masséna
- Access 3: avenue d'Italie
- Access 4: rue Fernand Widal (with an ascending escalator) (exit only)

=== Station layout ===
Street Level
B1	Mezzanine
Platform level	Side platform, doors will open on the right
Platform level	Southbound	← toward Mairie d'Ivry (Porte de Choisy)
Platform level	Northbound	toward La Courneuve–8 mai 1945 (Maison Blanche) →
Platform level	Side platform, doors will open on the right

=== Platforms ===
The slightly curved station has a standard configuration with 2 tracks surrounded by 2 side platforms.

=== Other connections ===
==== Tramway ====
The station has been served by tramway T3a since 16 December 2006 as part of its initial section between Pont du Garigliano and Porte d'Ivry.

==== Bus ====
The station is also served by lines 47, 131, 184, 185, and 186 of the RATP bus network, and at night, by lines N15, N22, and N144 of the Noctilien bus network.

== Nearby ==
- Jardin du Moulin-de-la-Pointe - Paul Quilès
- Parc Kellermann
- Porte d'Italie
- Square Hélène-Boucher
- Square Robert-Bajac

== Gallery ==
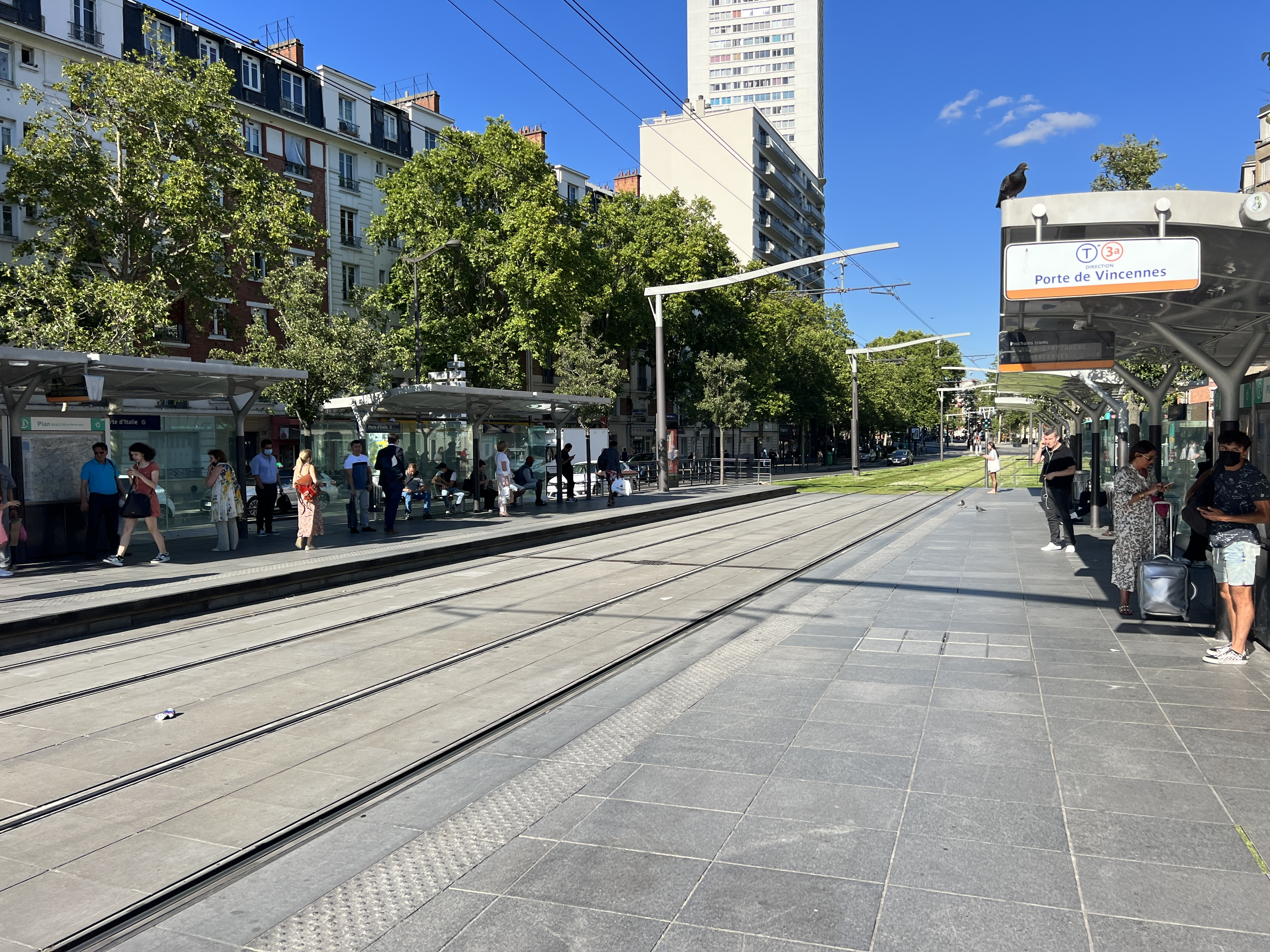
Tramway T3a stop

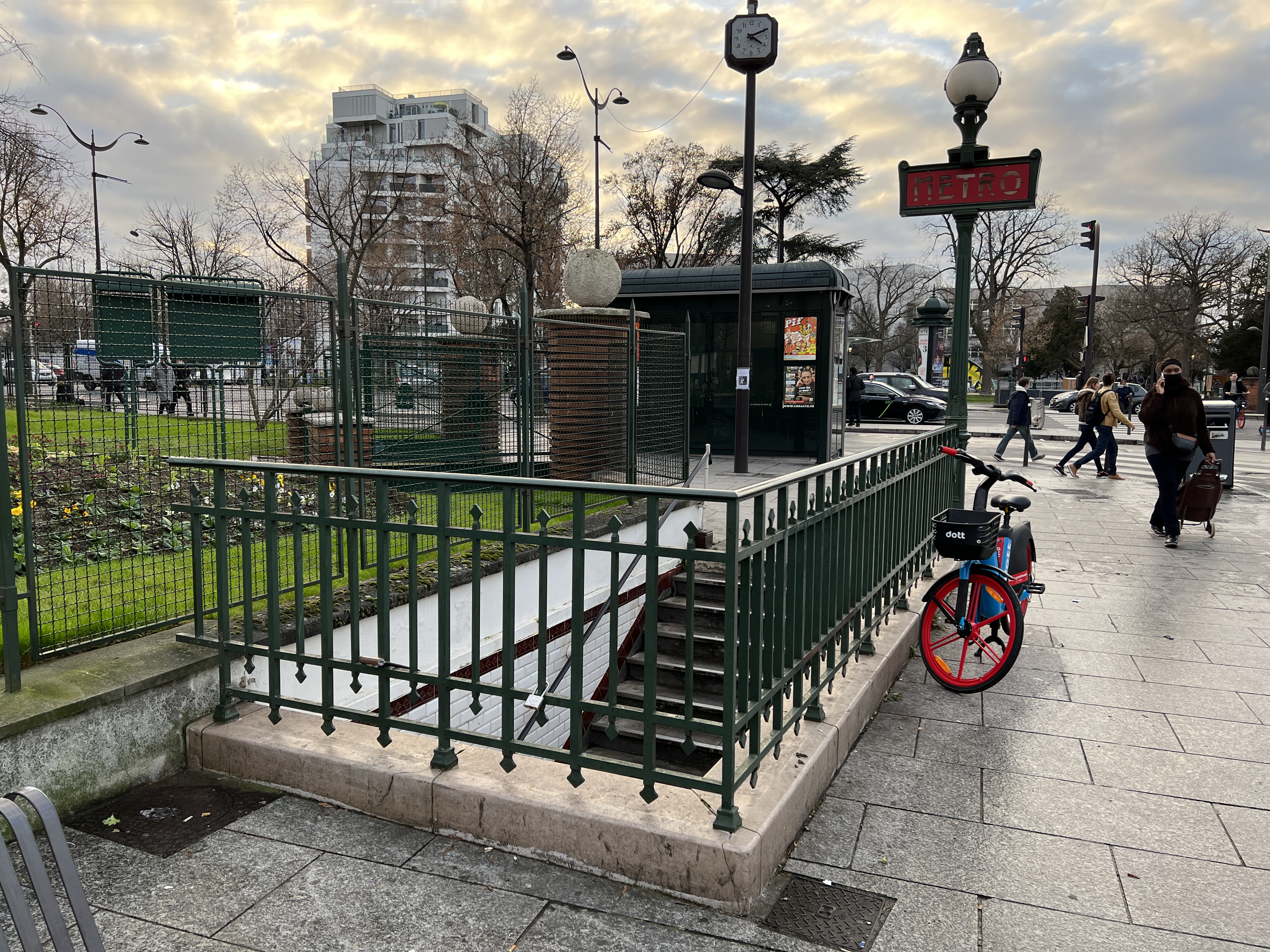
Access 1

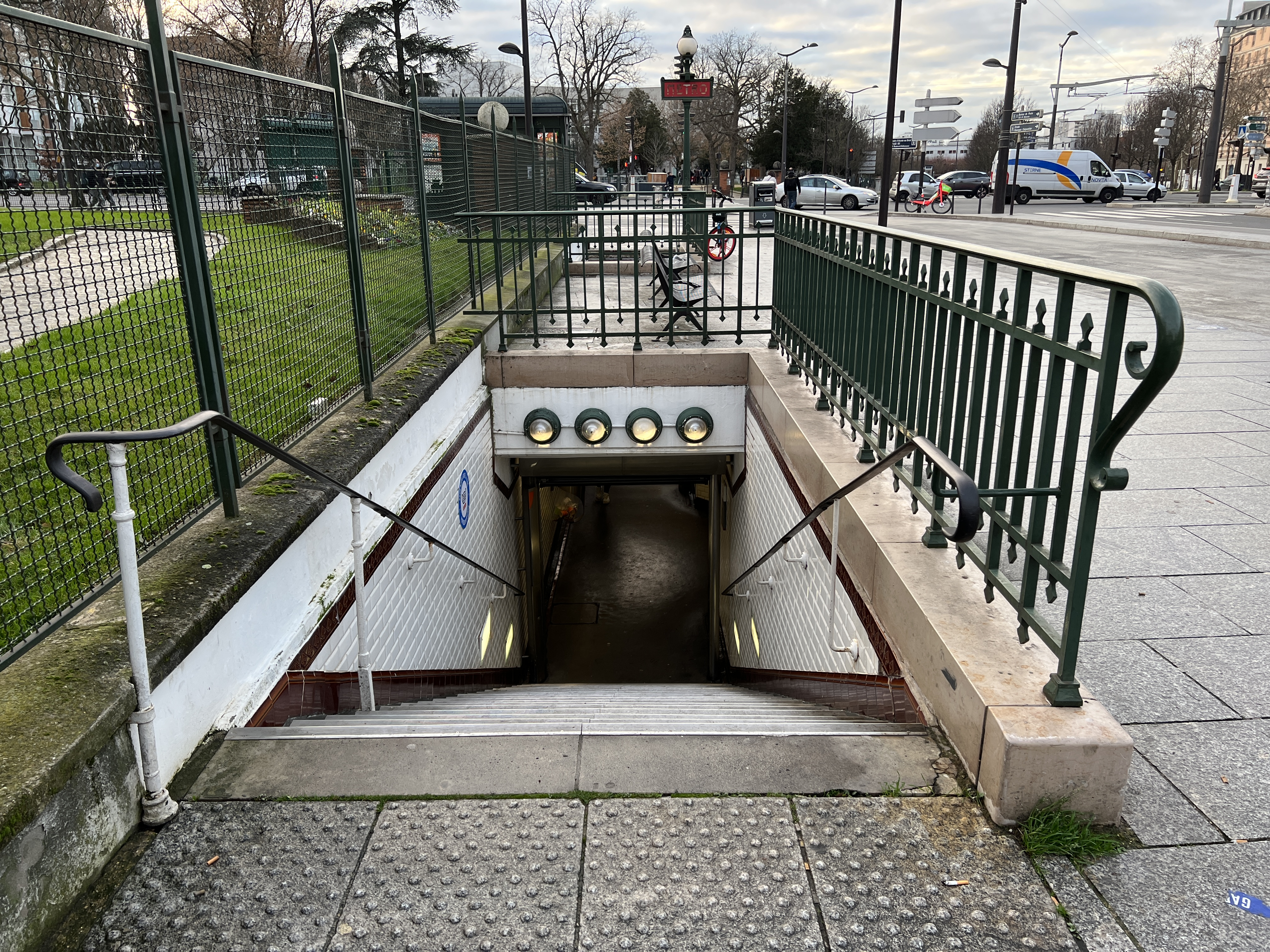
Another view of access 1

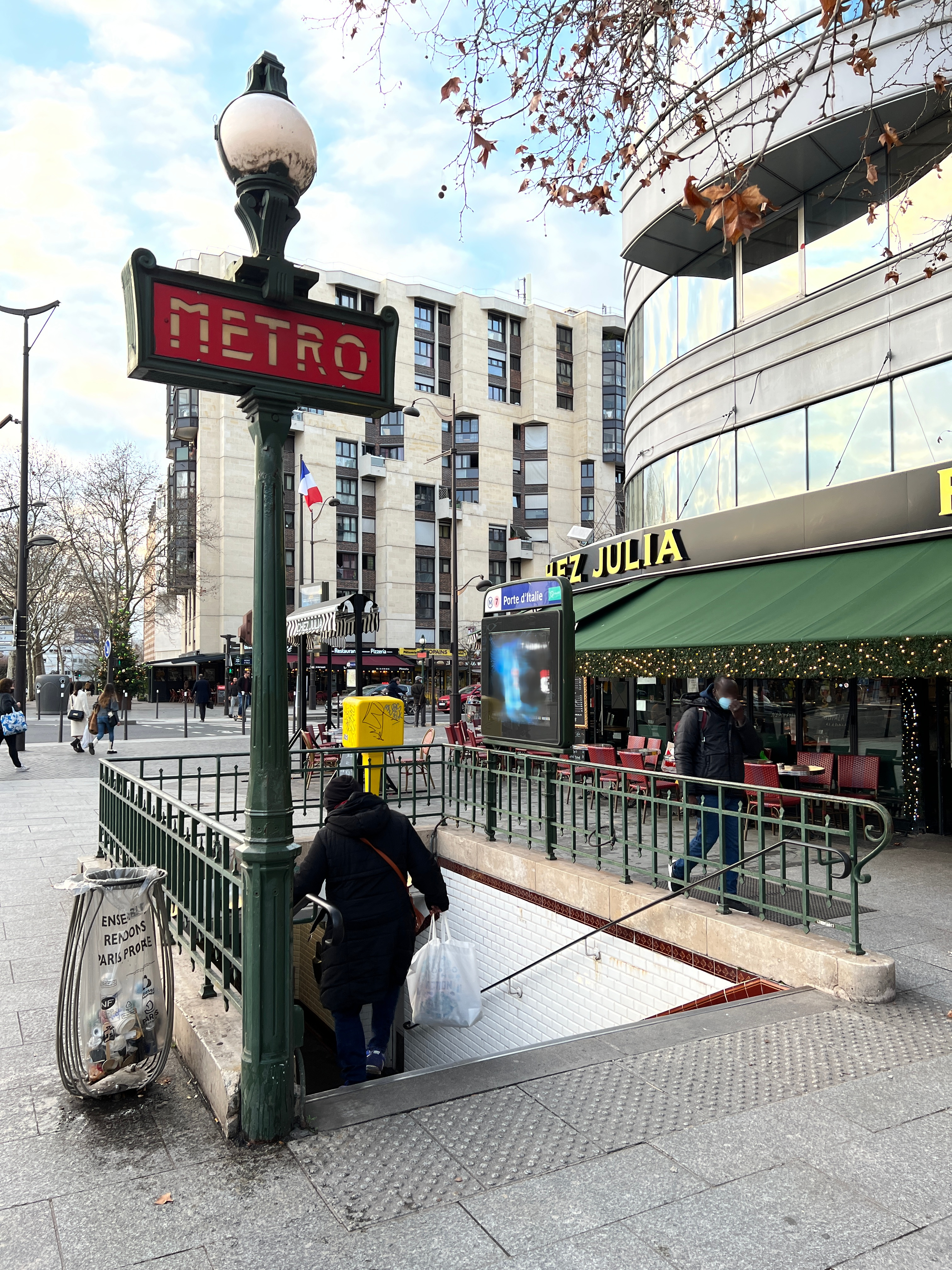
Access 2

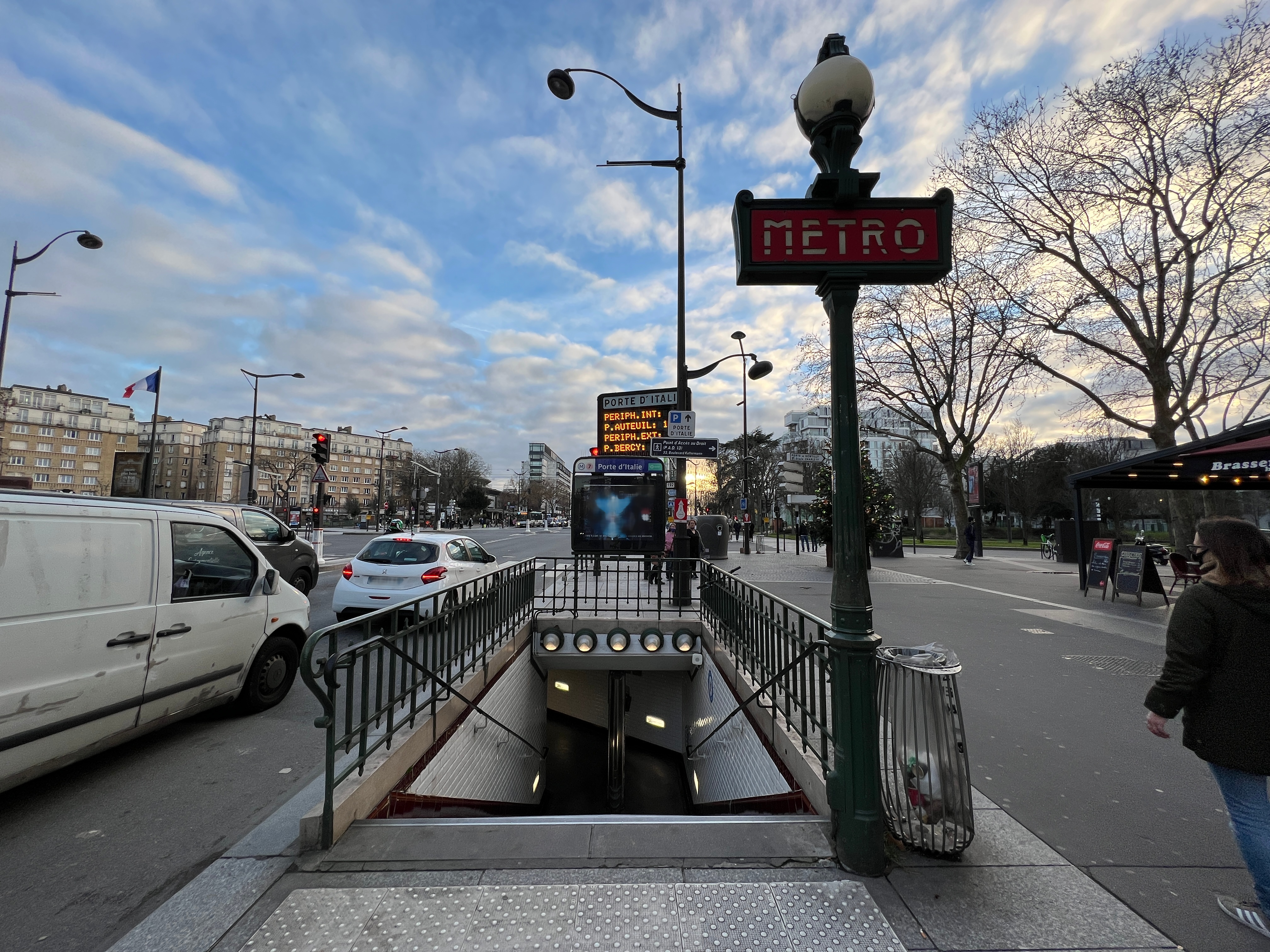
Access 3

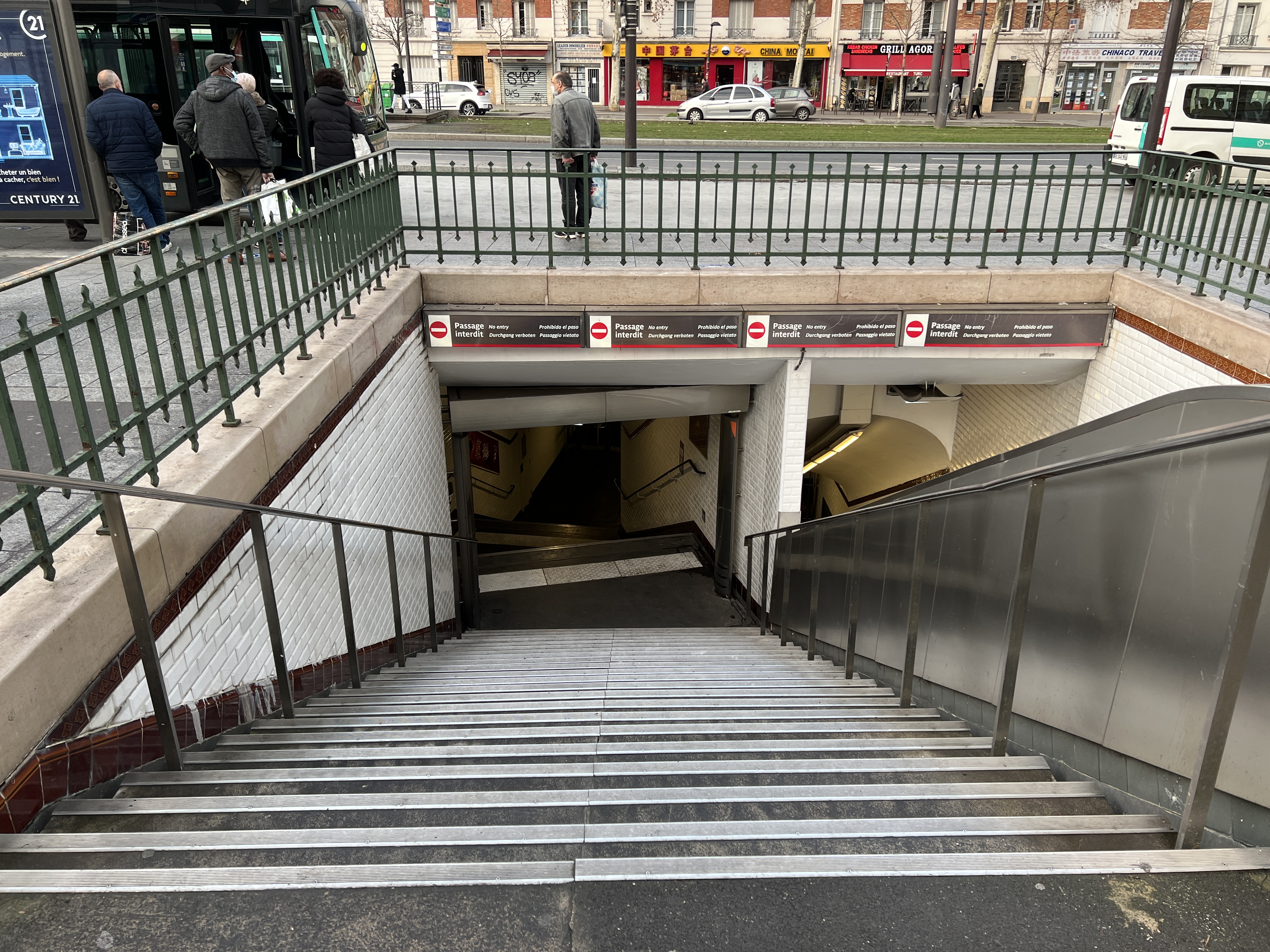
Access 4
