= Porte de Choisy station =

Metro station in Paris, France

Porte de Choisy
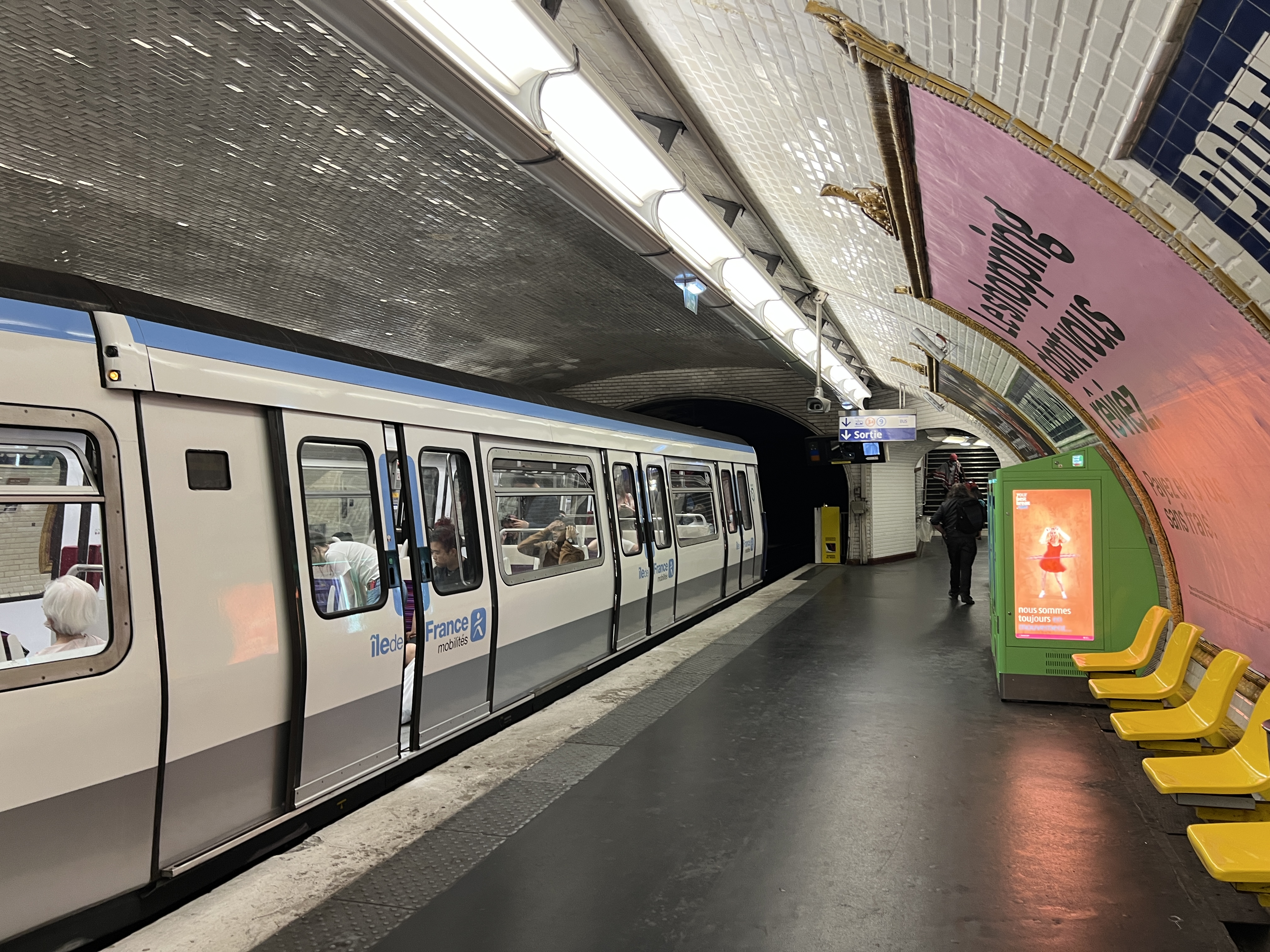
- MF 77 at Porte de Choisy

General information
- Location: 13th arrondissement of Paris; Île-de-France; France
- Coordinates: 48°49′13″N 2°21′55″E
- System: Paris Métro station
- Owner: RATP
- Operator: RATP
- Line: Paris Metro Paris Metro Line 7
- Platforms: 2 (2 side platforms)
- Tracks: 2

Construction
- Accessible: no

Other information
- Station code: 14-02
- Fare zone: 1

History
- Opened: 7 March 1930; 96 years ago

Passengers
- 1,592,144 (2021)

Services
Preceding station	Paris Metro	Following station
Porte d'Ivry towards Mairie d'Ivry	Line 7 Ivry branch	Porte d'Italie towards La Courneuve–8 mai 1945
Location
- Location within Paris

Porte de Choisy (French pronunciation: [pɔʁt də ʃwazi]) is a station on line 7 of the Paris Métro, a stop on tramway T3a as well as the northern terminus of tramway T9 in the 13th arrondissement. It is named after the Porte de Choisy, a gate in the nineteenth century Thiers wall of Paris, which led to Choisy-le-Roi.

== History ==
The station opened on 7 March 1930 as part of line 10's extension from Place d'Italie, then serving as its eastern terminus (from Invalides). On 26 April 1931, it was transferred to line 7 and ceased to be a terminus when it was extended to Porte d' Ivry to the south.

The service, then provided by all trains on the line, is now only provided by one out of every two trains when a second branch to Le Kremlin–Bicêtre (now further extended to Villejuif–Louis Aragon) opened on 10 December 1982.

As part of the "Un métro + beau" programme by the RATP, the station's corridors and platform lighting were renovated and modernised on 22 September 2005.

In 2019, the station was used by 2,598,026 passengers, making it the 200th busiest of the Métro network out of 302 stations.

In anticipation of the increased traffic expected at the station after tramway T9 opens, a new access towards it was constructed in two phases, with it consisting of two new staircases, including an escalator. In the first phase, tramway T3a was temporarily closed between Porte d'Ivry and Porte d'Italie from 22 July to 23 August 2019 to facilitate the construction under its tracks, with RATP bus line 27 extended to service the closed stops. In the second phase, the line 7 station was closed from 6 January to 29 June 2020 (with trains passing without stopping) to enable a new corridor towards the new access to be built. Station equipment was also modernised.

In 2020, the station was used by 647,656 passengers amidst the COVID-19 pandemic, making it the 282nd busiest of the Métro network out of 304 stations.

In 2021, the station was used by 1,592,144 passengers, making it the 221st busiest of the Métro network out of 304 stations.

== Passenger services ==
=== Access ===
The station has four accesses:

- Access 1: avenue de Choisy
- Access 2: Boulevard Masséna
- Access 3: avenue de la Porte-de-Choisy
- Access 4: rue Alfred Fouillée

=== Station layout ===
Street Level
B1	Mezzanine
Platform level	Side platform, doors will open on the right
Platform level	Southbound	← toward Mairie d'Ivry (Porte d'Ivry)
Platform level	Northbound	toward La Courneuve–8 mai 1945 (Porte d'Italie) →
Platform level	Side platform, doors will open on the right

=== Platforms ===
The station has a standard configuration with 2 tracks surrounded by 2 side platforms.

=== Other connections ===
==== Tramway ====
The station has been served by tramway T3a since 16 December 2006 and by tramway T9 since 10 April 2021, serving as its northern terminus.

It is one of four métro stations on the network that are located at one of the former gates of Paris and are served by two tram lines; the other three are Balard (line 8), Porte de Versailles (line 12), and Porte de Vincennes (line 1). Basilique de Saint-Denis (line 13) is the only station served by two tram lines not located at one of the gates of Paris.

==== Bus ====
The station is also served by line N31 of the Noctilien bus network at night.

== Nearby ==
- Halle Georges Carpentier

== Gallery ==
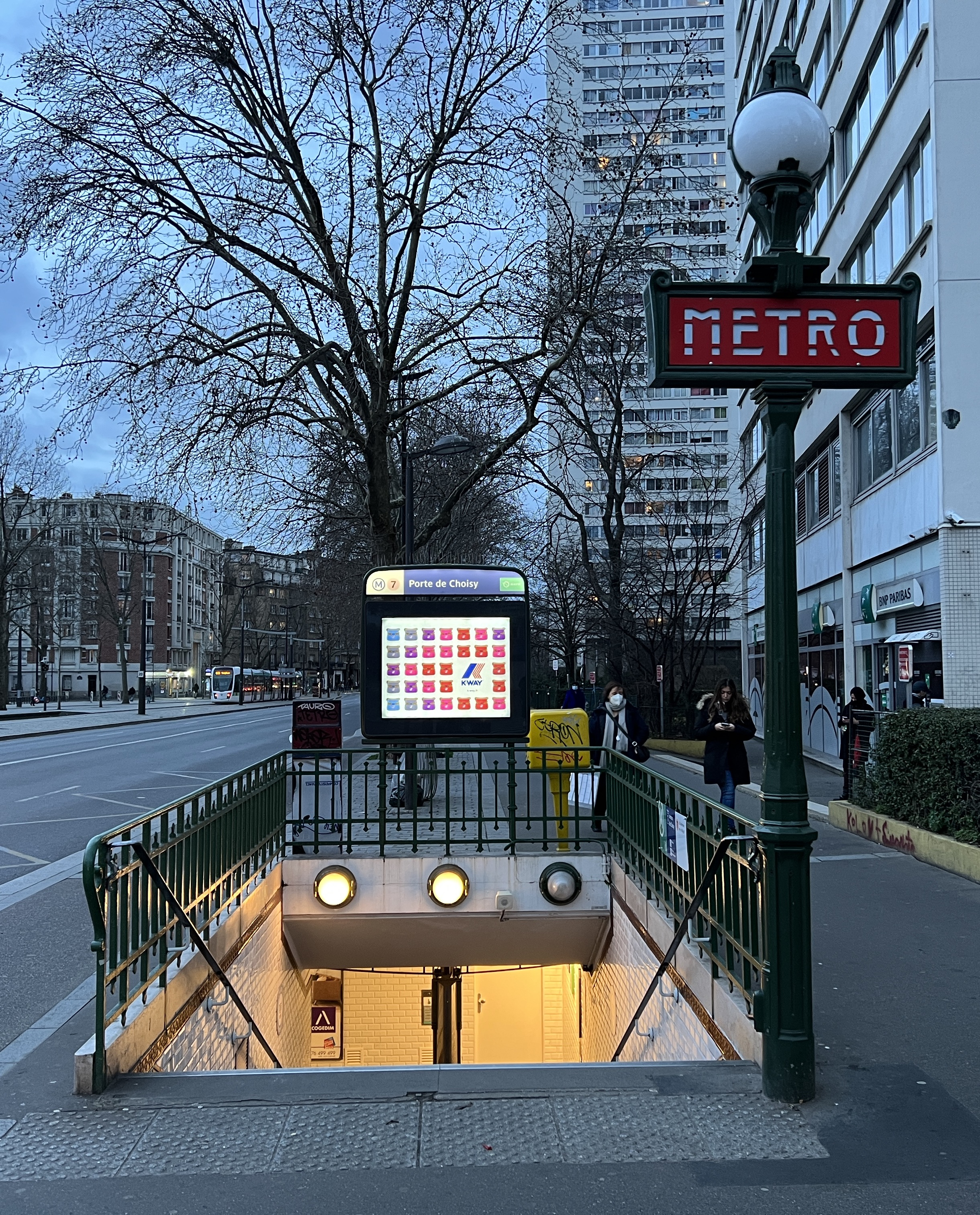
Access 1

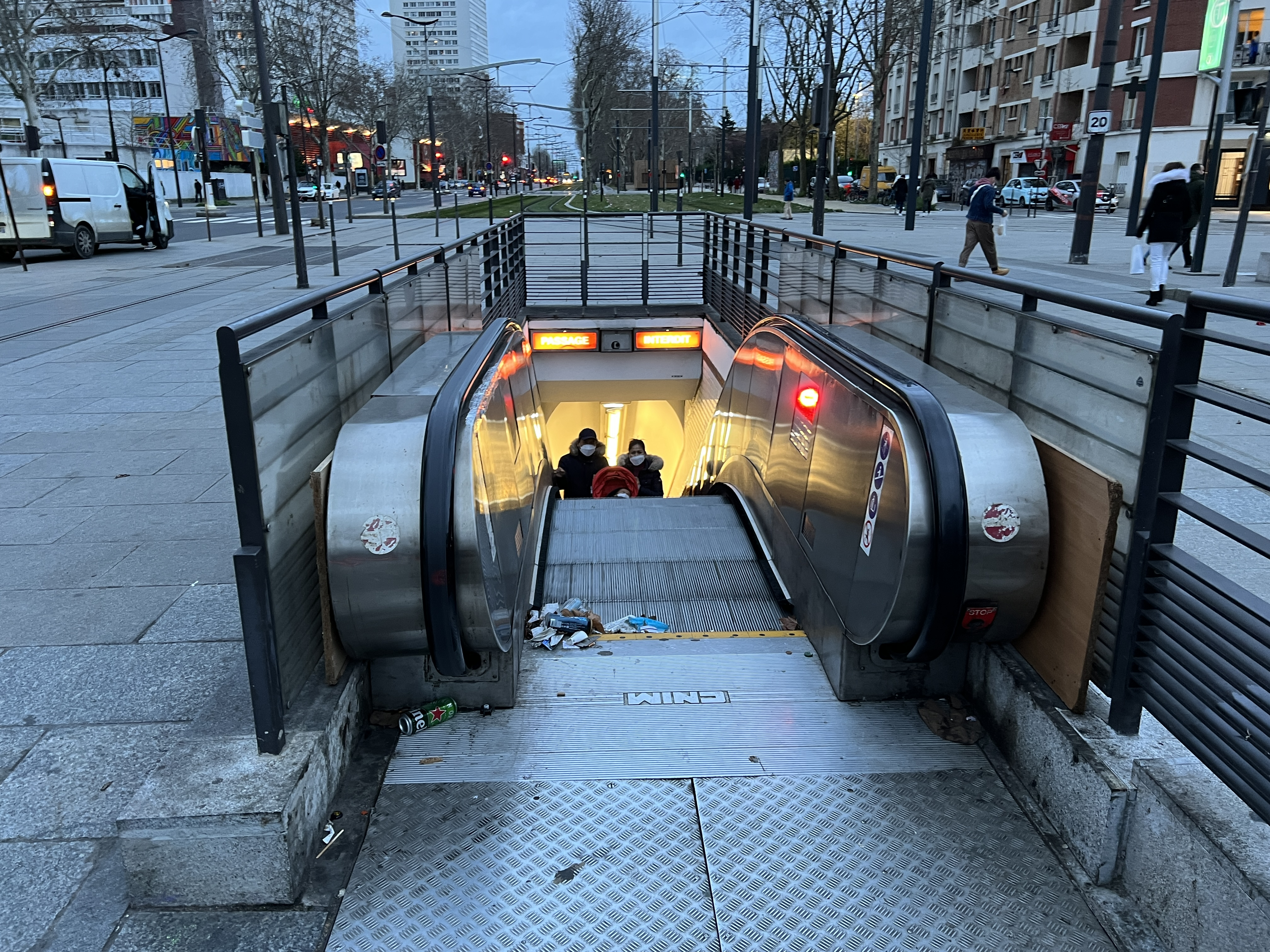
Access 2

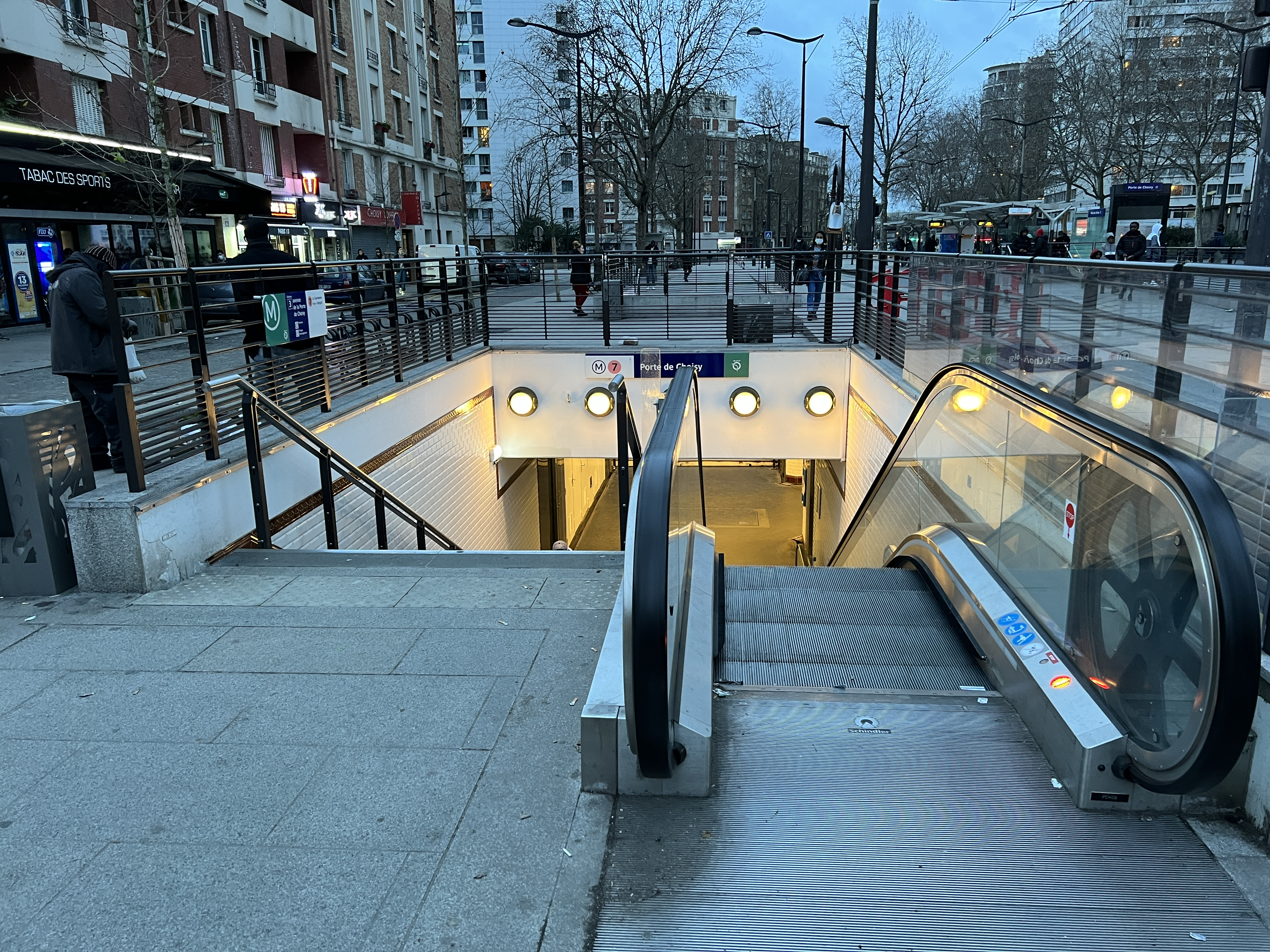
Access 3

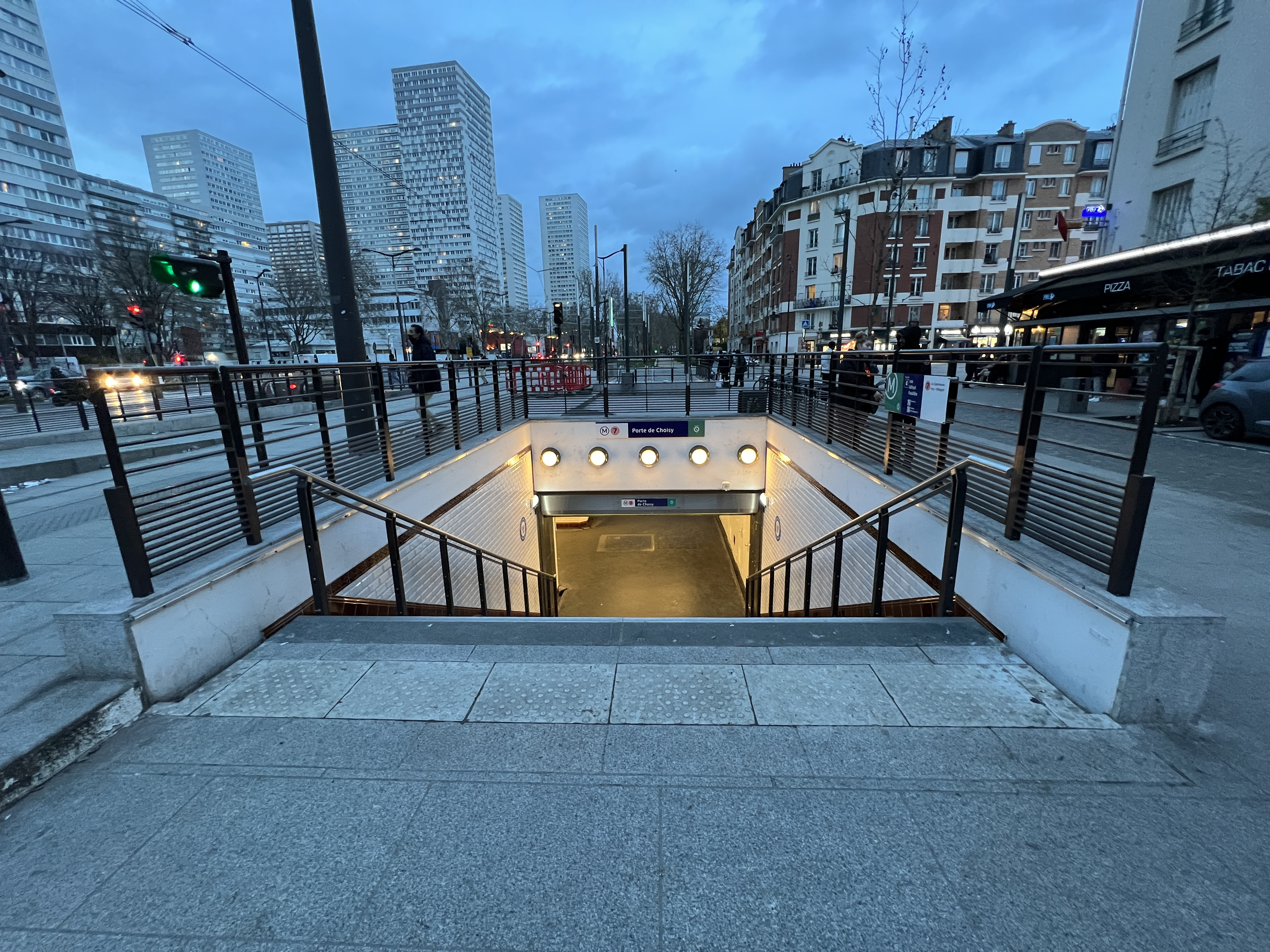
Access 3

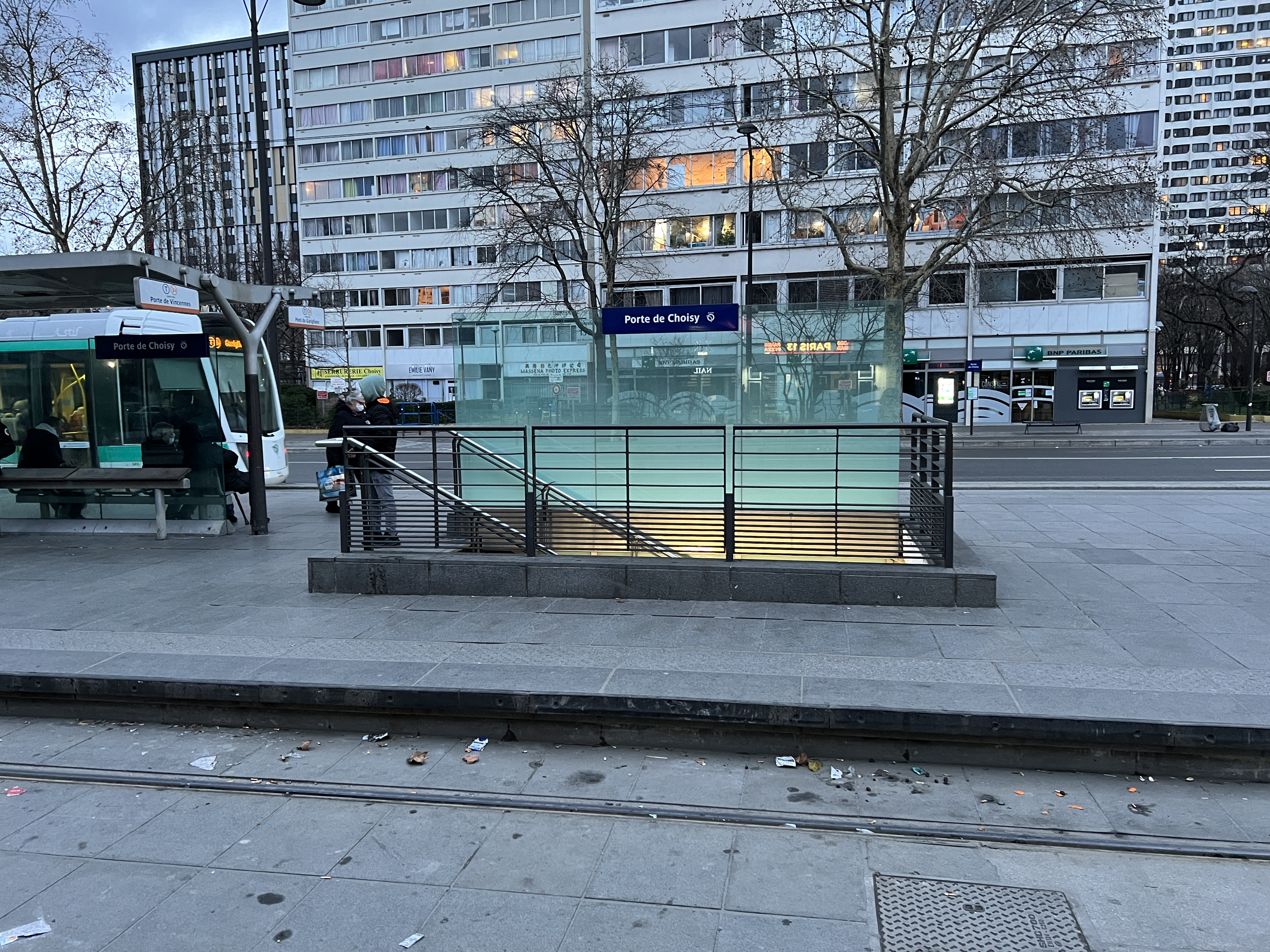
Access 4

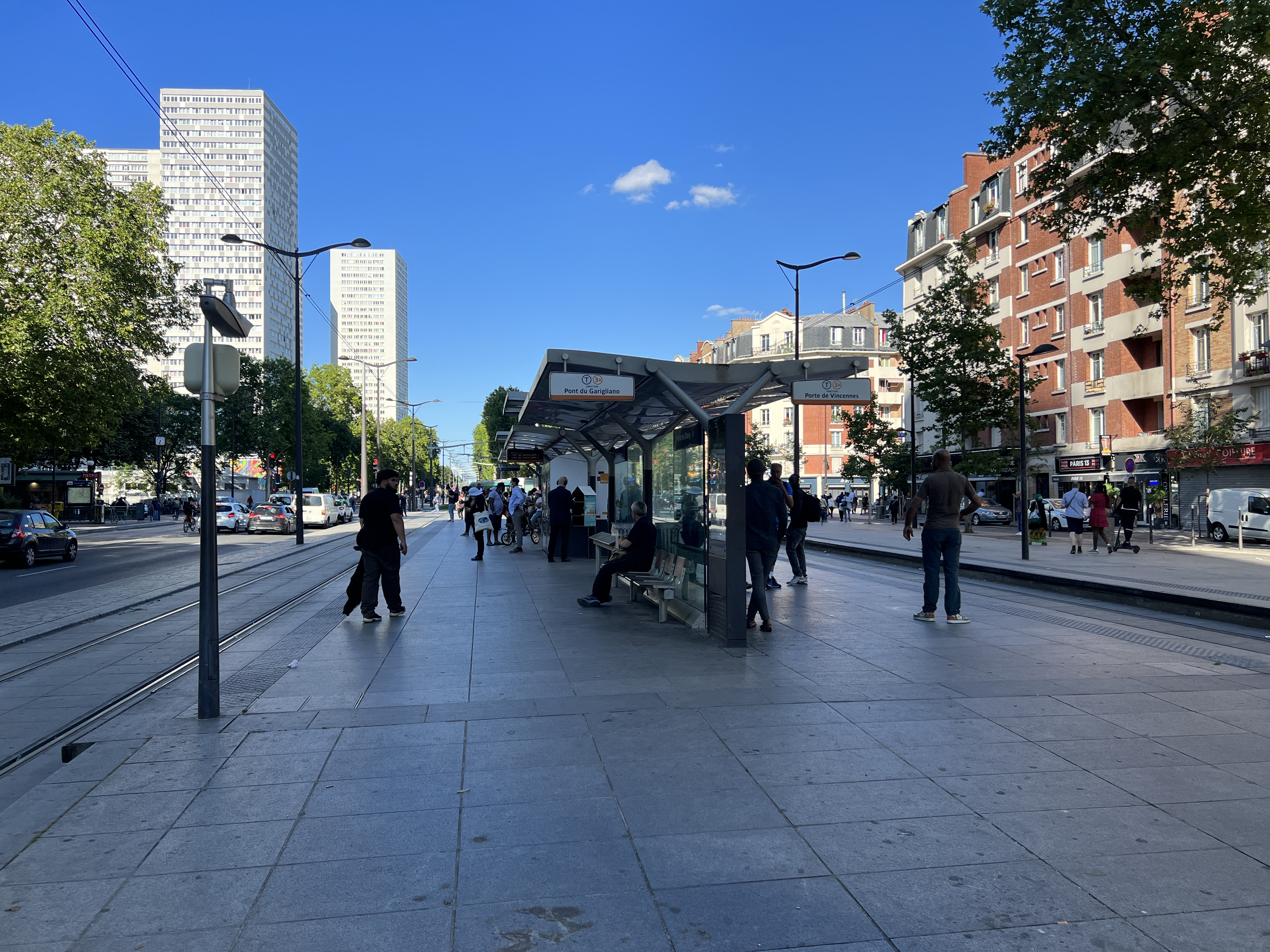
Tramway T3a stop

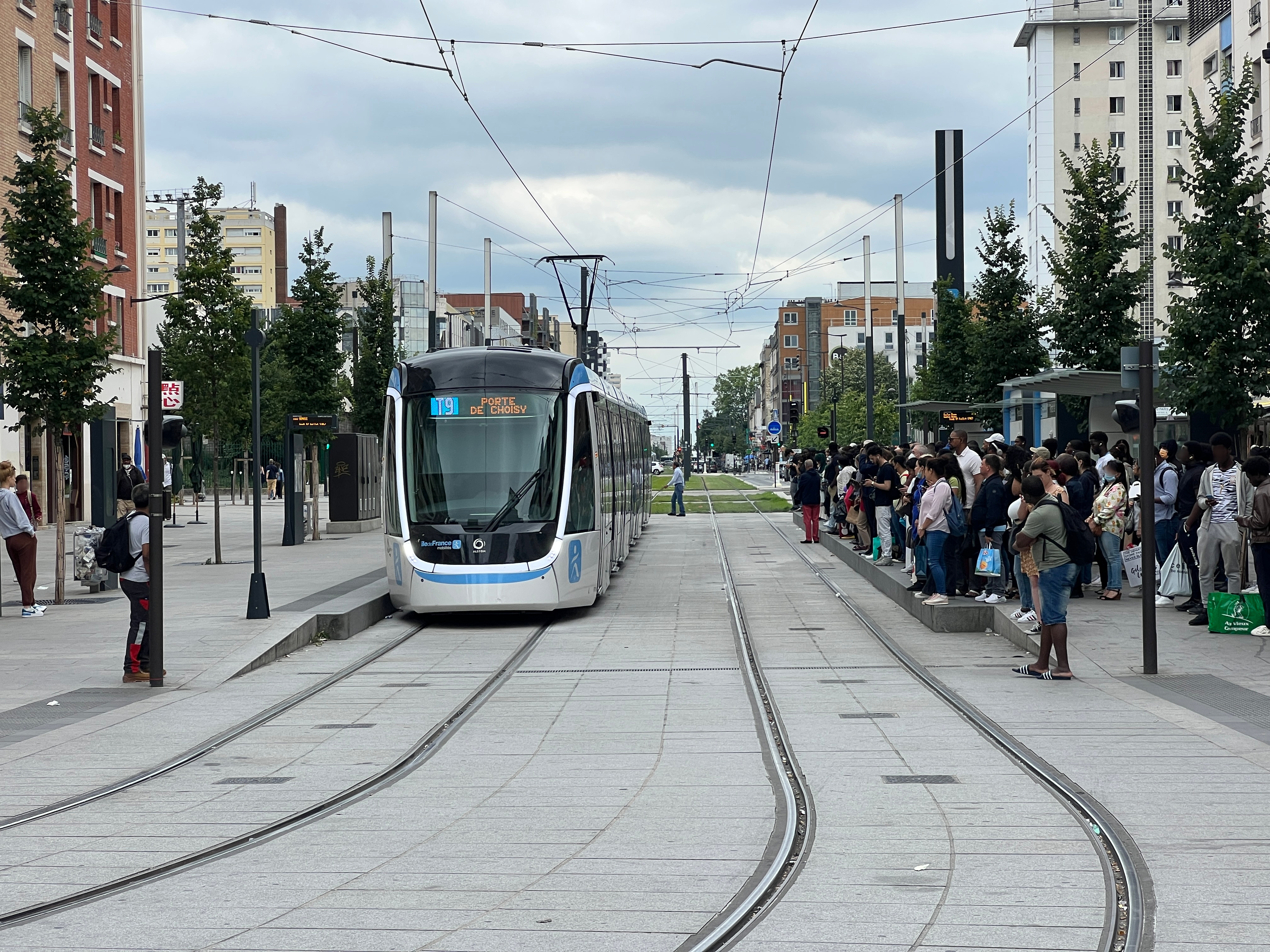
Tramway T9 stop

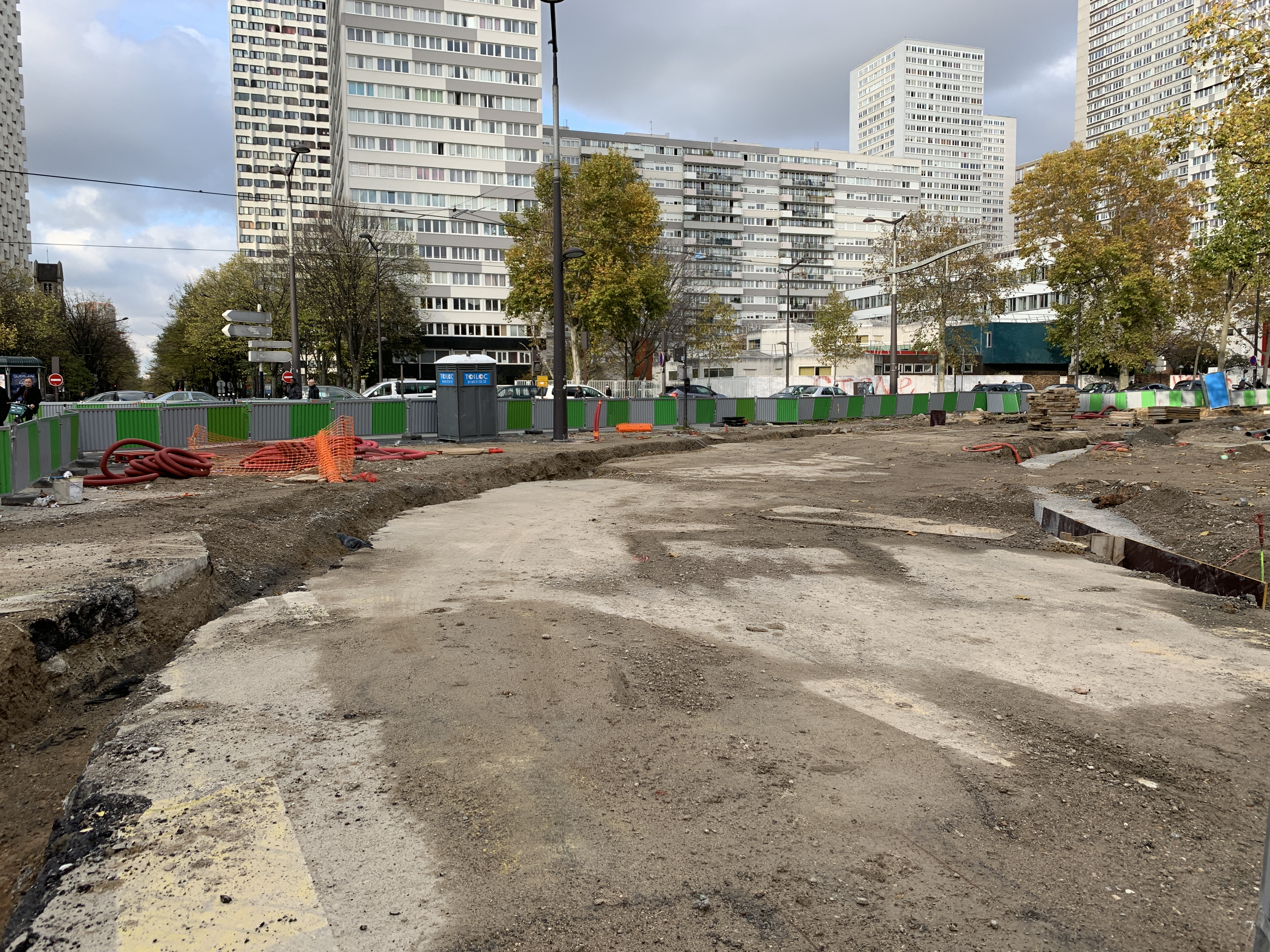
Tramway T9 works at the station in 2019
