= Pierre et Marie Curie station =

Paris Metro station in Ivry-sur-Seine

Pierre et Marie Curie
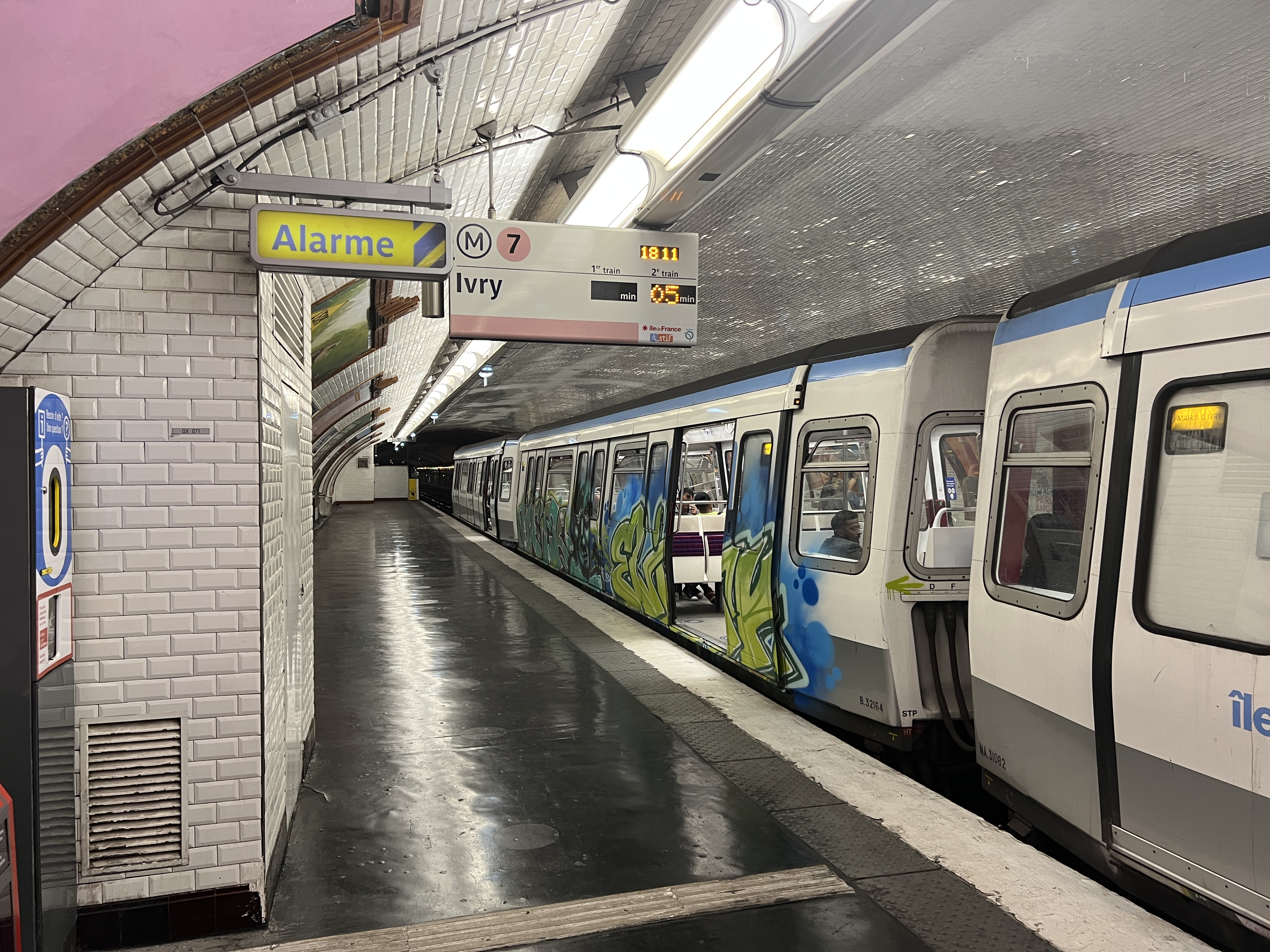

General information
- Location: Ivry-sur-Seine; Île-de-France; France
- Coordinates: 48°48′57″N 2°22′40″E
- System: Paris Metro station
- Owner: RATP
- Operator: RATP

Other information
- Fare zone: 1

History
- Opened: 1 May 1946; 80 years ago

Services
Preceding station	Paris Metro	Following station
Mairie d'Ivry Terminus	Line 7 Ivry branch	Porte d'Ivry towards La Courneuve–8 mai 1945
Location
- Location within Paris

Pierre et Marie Curie (French pronunciation: [pjɛʁ e maʁi kyʁi]) is a station on the southeast branch of Line 7 of the Paris Metro. The station, located in Ivry-sur-Seine, was opened in 1946.

It was previously known as Pierre Curie. Following a renovation completed on 31 January 2007, it was renamed to honour his wife and fellow Nobel laureate Marie Curie (Maria Skłodowska-Curie) as well on 8 March, International Women's Day. It thereby became the third station on the métro named for a woman that is not a saint, after Marguerite de Rochechouart and Louise Michel.

== Station layout ==
Street level		Accesses
B1		Connecting level
Line 7 platforms	Side platform, doors will open on the right
Line 7 platforms	Southbound	← toward Mairie d'Ivry (Terminus)
Line 7 platforms	Northbound	toward La Courneuve–8 mai 1945 (Porte d'Ivry) →
Line 7 platforms	Side platform, doors will open on the right

== Gallery ==
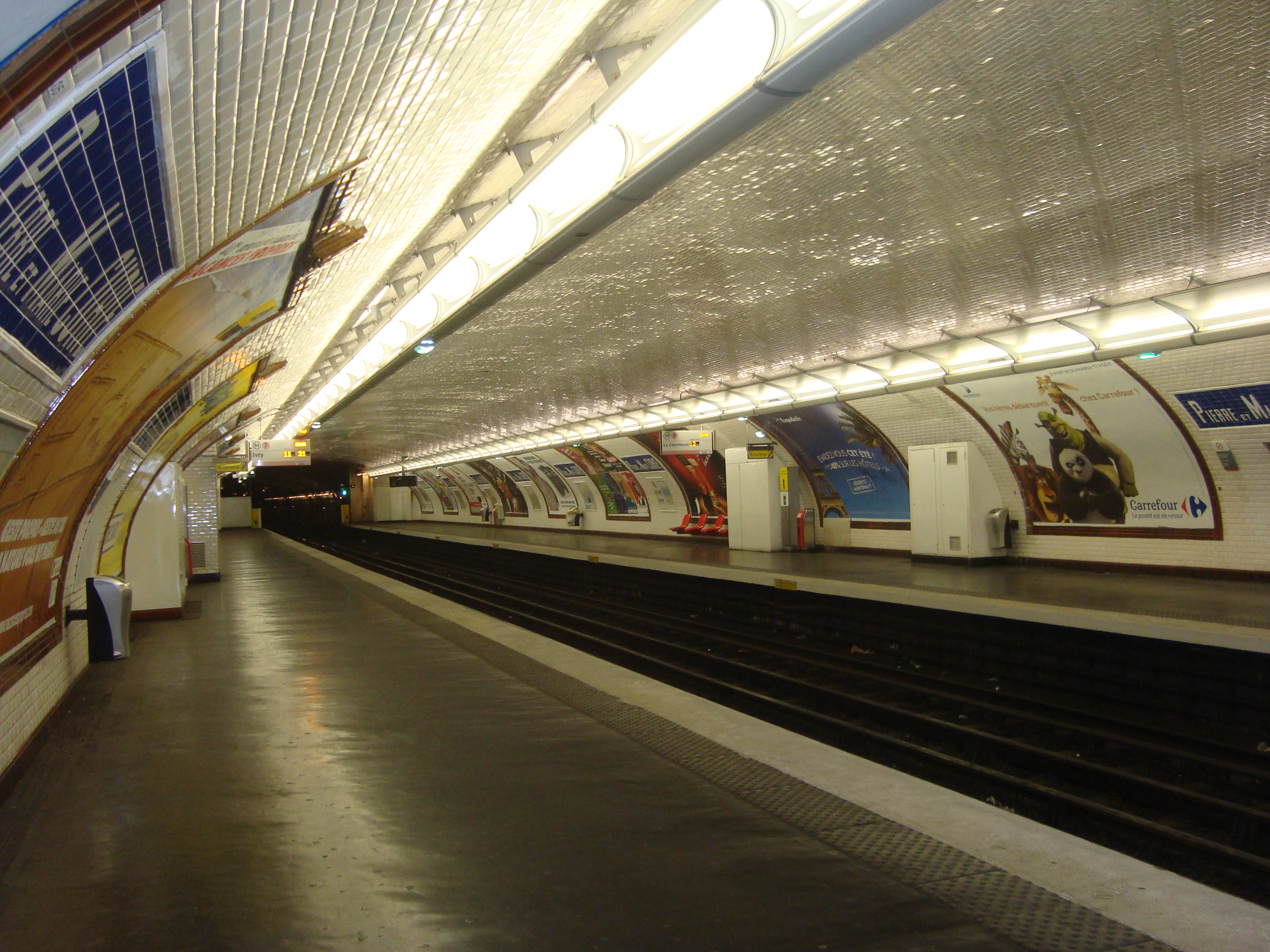
Line 7 platforms at Pierre et Marie Curie
