= Porte d'Ivry station =

Metro station in Paris, France

Porte d'Ivry
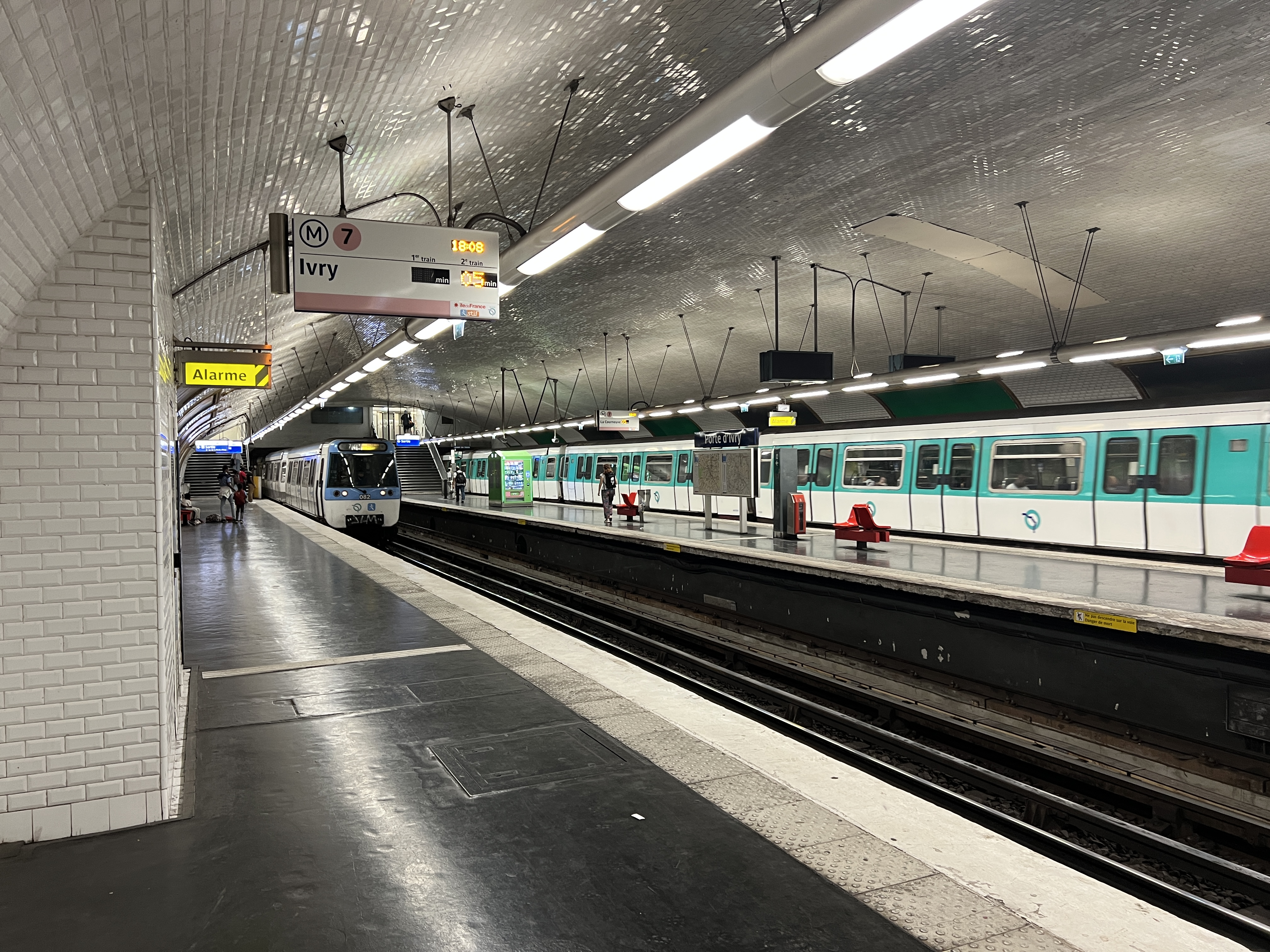

General information
- Location: 13th arrondissement of Paris; Île-de-France; France
- Coordinates: 48°49′15″N 2°22′14″E
- System: Paris Métro station
- Owner: RATP
- Operator: RATP

Other information
- Fare zone: 1

History
- Opened: 26 April 1931; 95 years ago

Services
Preceding station	Paris Metro	Following station
Pierre et Marie Curie towards Mairie d'Ivry	Line 7 Ivry branch	Porte de Choisy towards La Courneuve–8 mai 1945
Location
- Location within Paris

Porte d'Ivry (French pronunciation: [pɔʁt divʁi]) is a station of the Paris Métro, serving Line 7 and Tramway Line 3a. It is named after the Porte d'Ivry, a gate in the nineteenth century Thiers wall of Paris on the road that led to Ivry-sur-Seine.

The station opened on 26 April 1931, when Line 7 took over the Line 10 route from Place Monge to Porte de Choisy and was extended to Porte d'Ivry. Porte d'Ivry was the terminus of Tramway Line 3 when it opened on 16 December 2006. It was extended to Porte de Vincennes on 15 December 2012 and renamed 3a.

== Station layout ==
Street Level

B1	Connecting level

Line 7 platforms	Side platform, doors will open on the right
Line 7 platforms	Southbound	← toward Mairie d'Ivry (Pierre et Marie Curie)
Line 7 platforms	Northbound	No regular service
Line 7 platforms	Island platform, doors will open on the left
Line 7 platforms	Northbound	toward La Courneuve–8 mai 1945 (Porte de Choisy) →

== Gallery ==
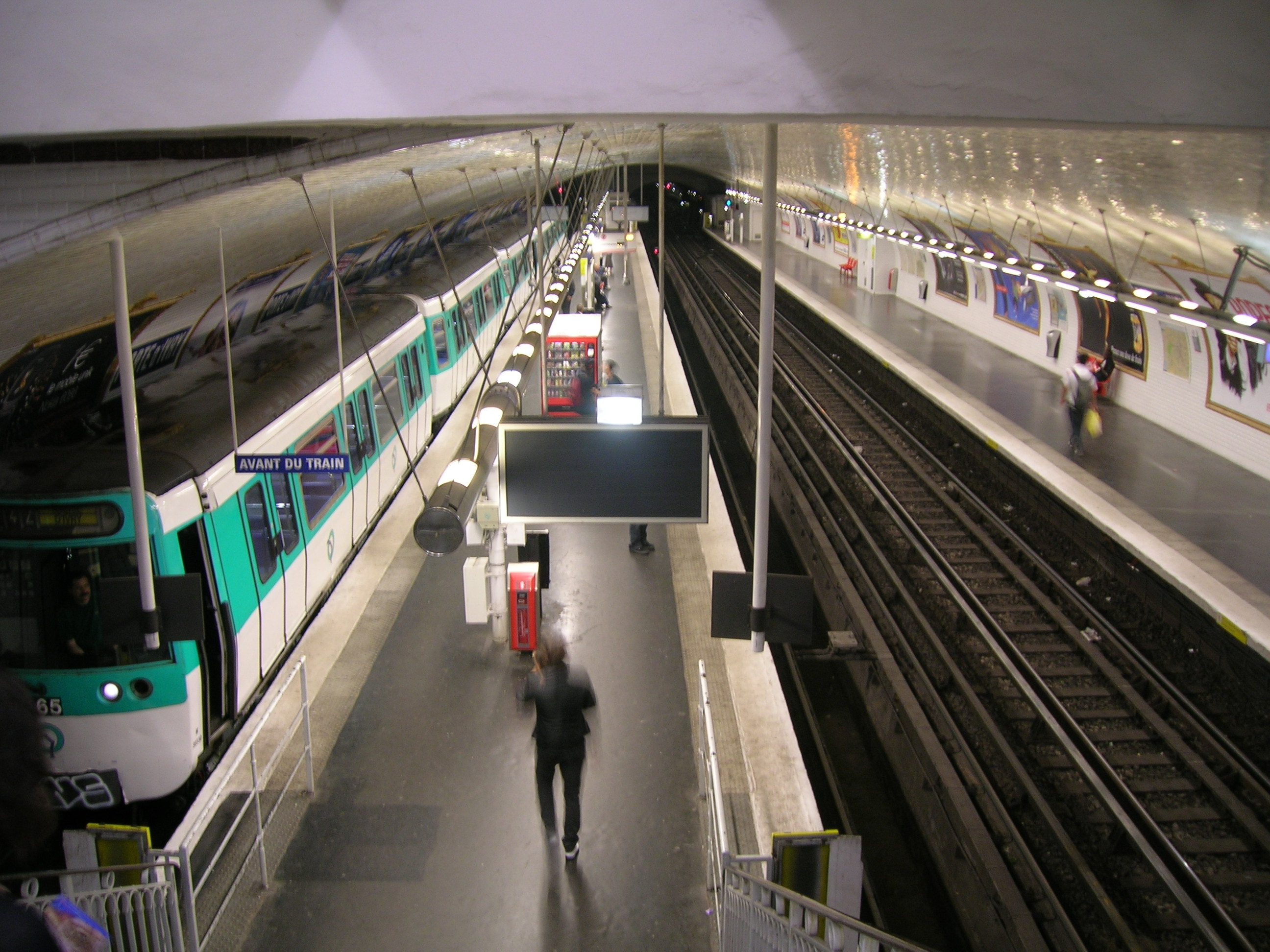
Line 7 platforms at Porte d'Ivry

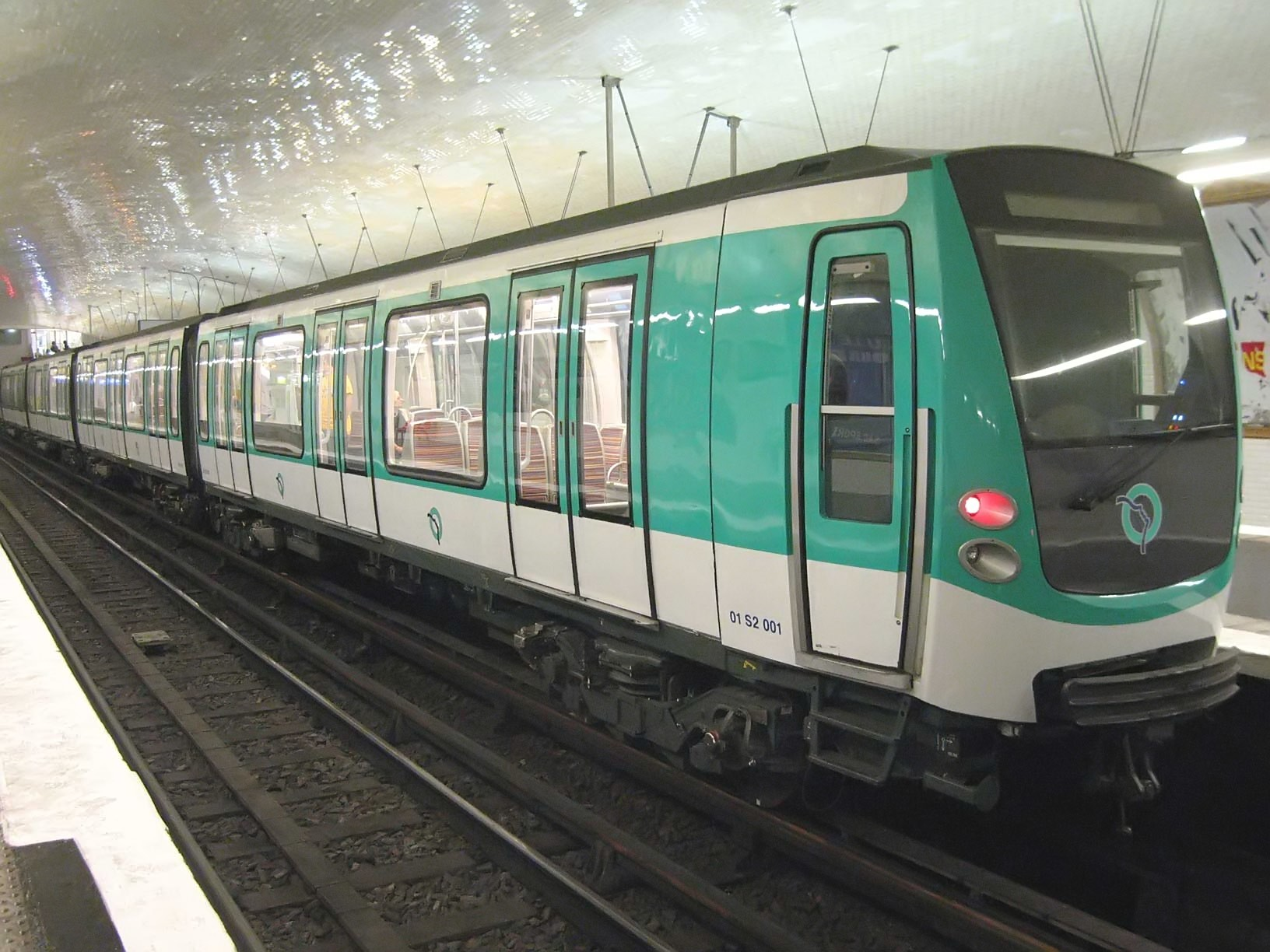
MF 2000 rolling stock on Line 7 at Porte d'Ivry...

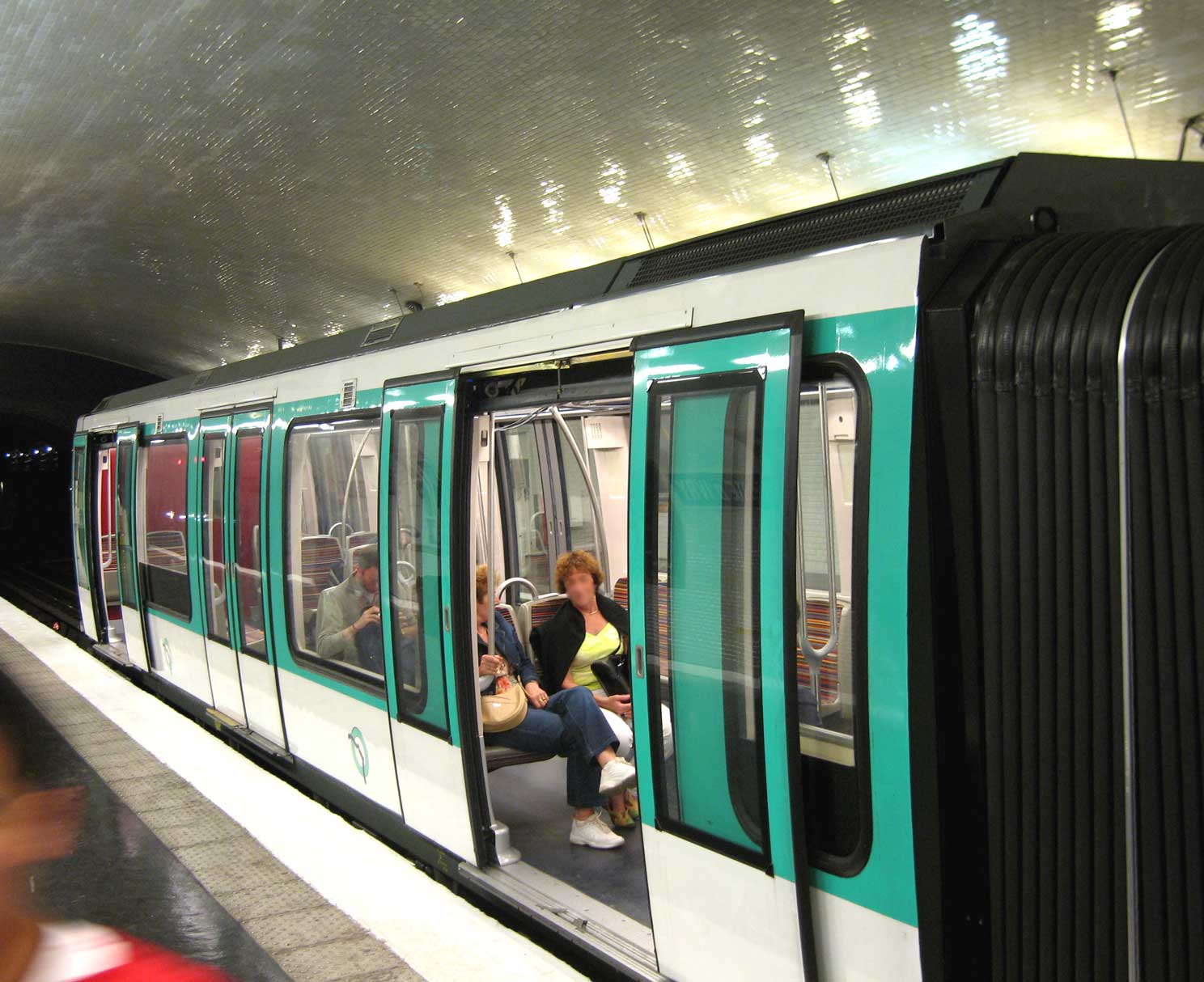
...during his tests.

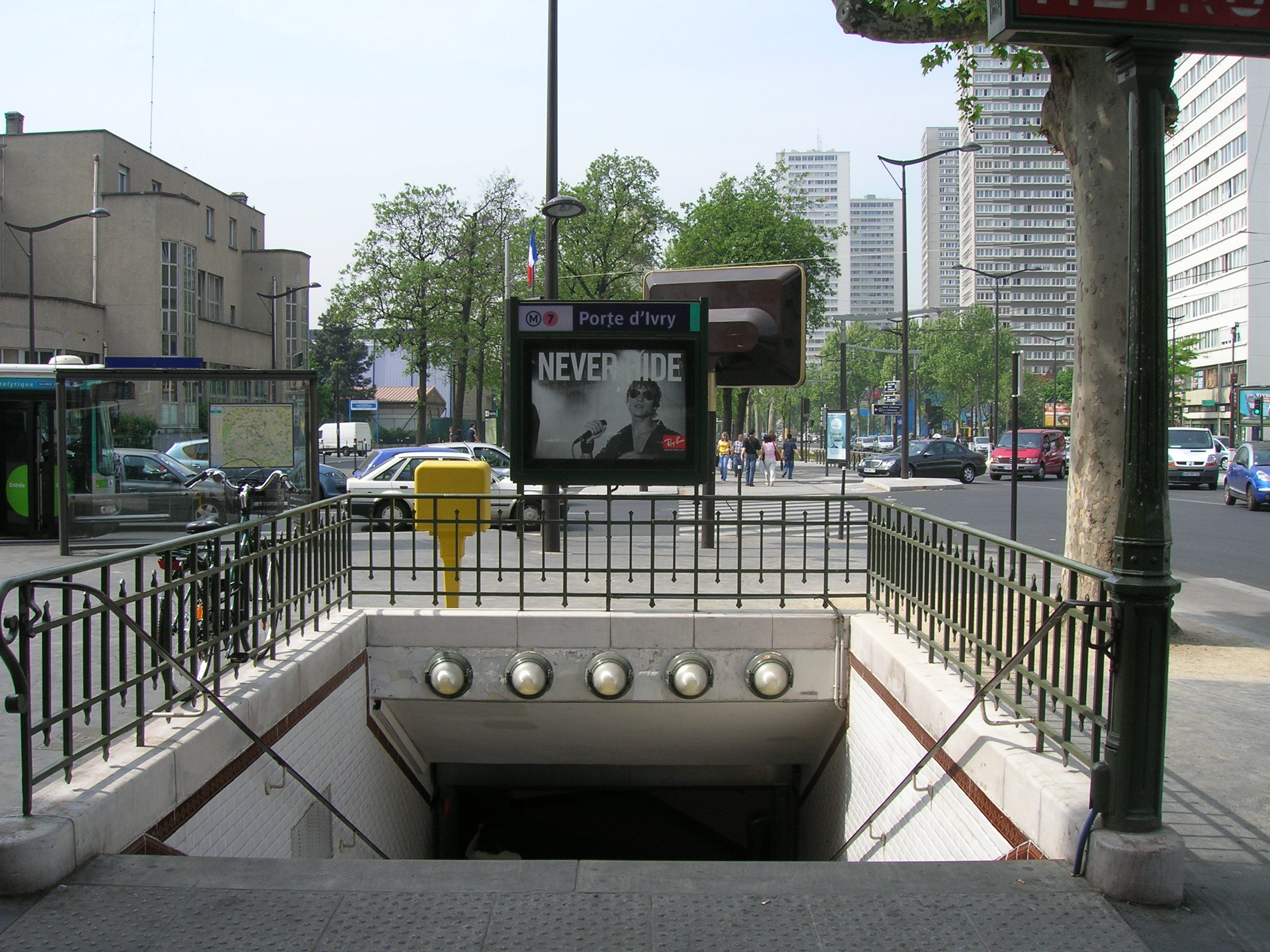
Porte d'Ivry station entrance

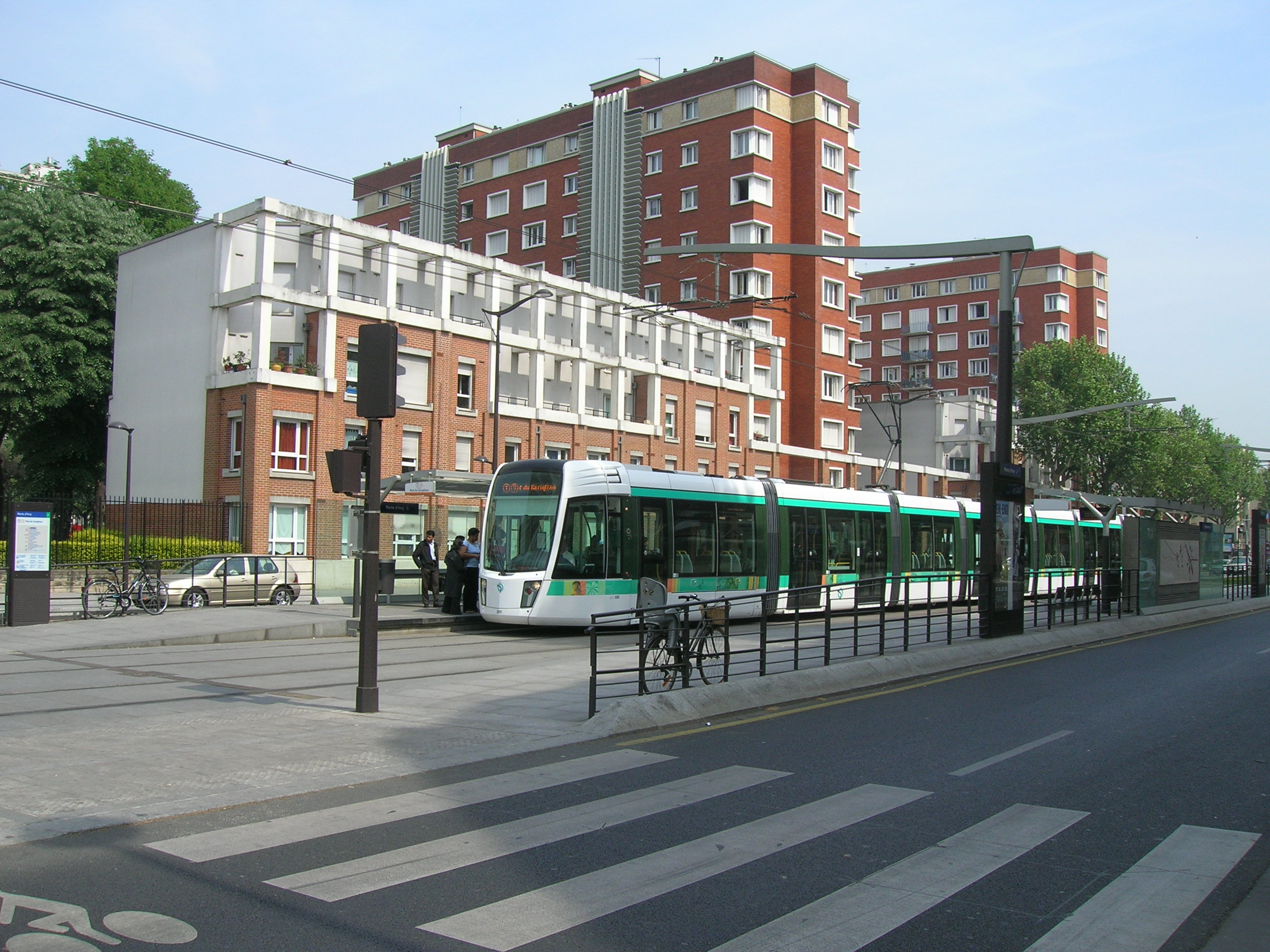
Porte d'Ivry T3a tram stop
