= Parc Kellermann =

Urban park in Paris, France

Coordinates: 48°49′07″N 2°21′18″E

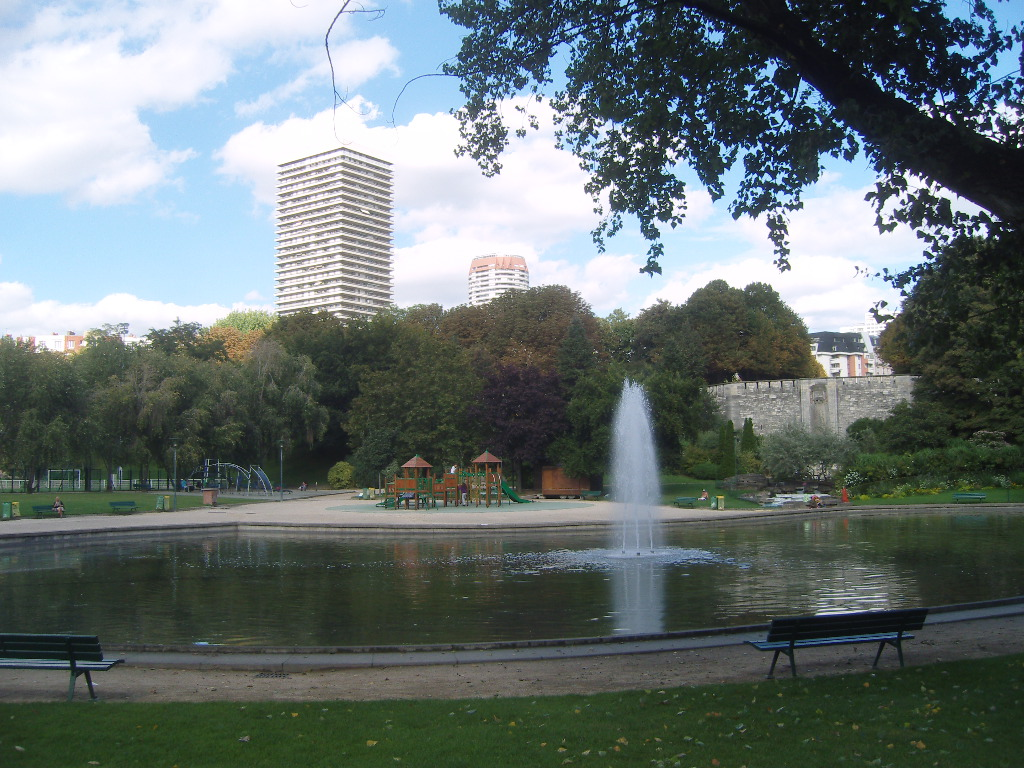
Parc Kellermann

Parc Kellermann is a public park located in the 13th arrondissement of Paris which was created between 1939 and 1950 on the former bed of the Bièvre river. The park is located between boulevard Kellermann, the rue de la Poterne-des-Peupliers, and rue Max-Jacob. The nearest metro station to the park is Porte-d'Italie.

== History ==
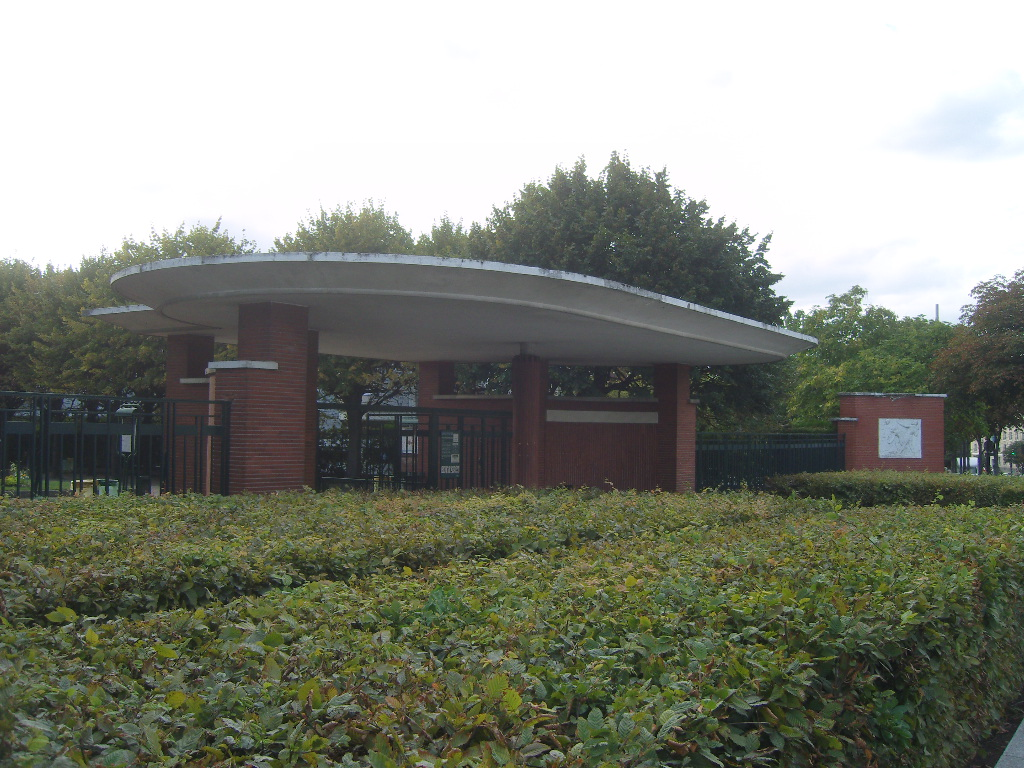
The art moderne entrance to the park

The park was built on the former bed of the Bièvre river, a tributary of the Seine which was covered over in the 20th century. In 1937, the future park was the site of several pavilions of the 1937 Paris Exposition whose main site was at the Place du Trocadéro. Following the exposition, the chief architect of the Exposition, Jacques Gréber, transformed it into a public park. Gréber had an international reputation as a landscape architect; he also designed the Fairmount Parkway, now the Benjamin Franklin Parkway, in Philadelphia. The park contains pieces of architecture and sculpture from the era of the Exposition, unfortunately deteriorated from their original state.

== Features of the park ==
The park occupies an area of 5.5 hectares, and has two different parts in two different styles; the upper park, which is in the art moderne landscape style of the 1930s; and the lower park, along the riverbed, in the more picturesque style of Napoleon III. The entrance to the upper park, on boulevard Kellermann, has an art moderne colonnade, made of cement and bricks and decorated with bas-reliefs of dancers and athletes by Élie Ottary. The entrance leads to a wide alley, bordered by rows of tilia, or linden trees, with a large lawn between, and an art moderne pavilion. The upper level has a fine view over the trees of the lower park and the city, but also overlooks the Peripherique highway, whose noise carries to the park. A short stream runs from the upper level through pools and a cascade of artificial rocks to the lower park, where it enters large kidney-shaped basin with a fountain. The eastern side of the lower park is the most forested and natural, while the western part is devoted to playgrounds and sports.

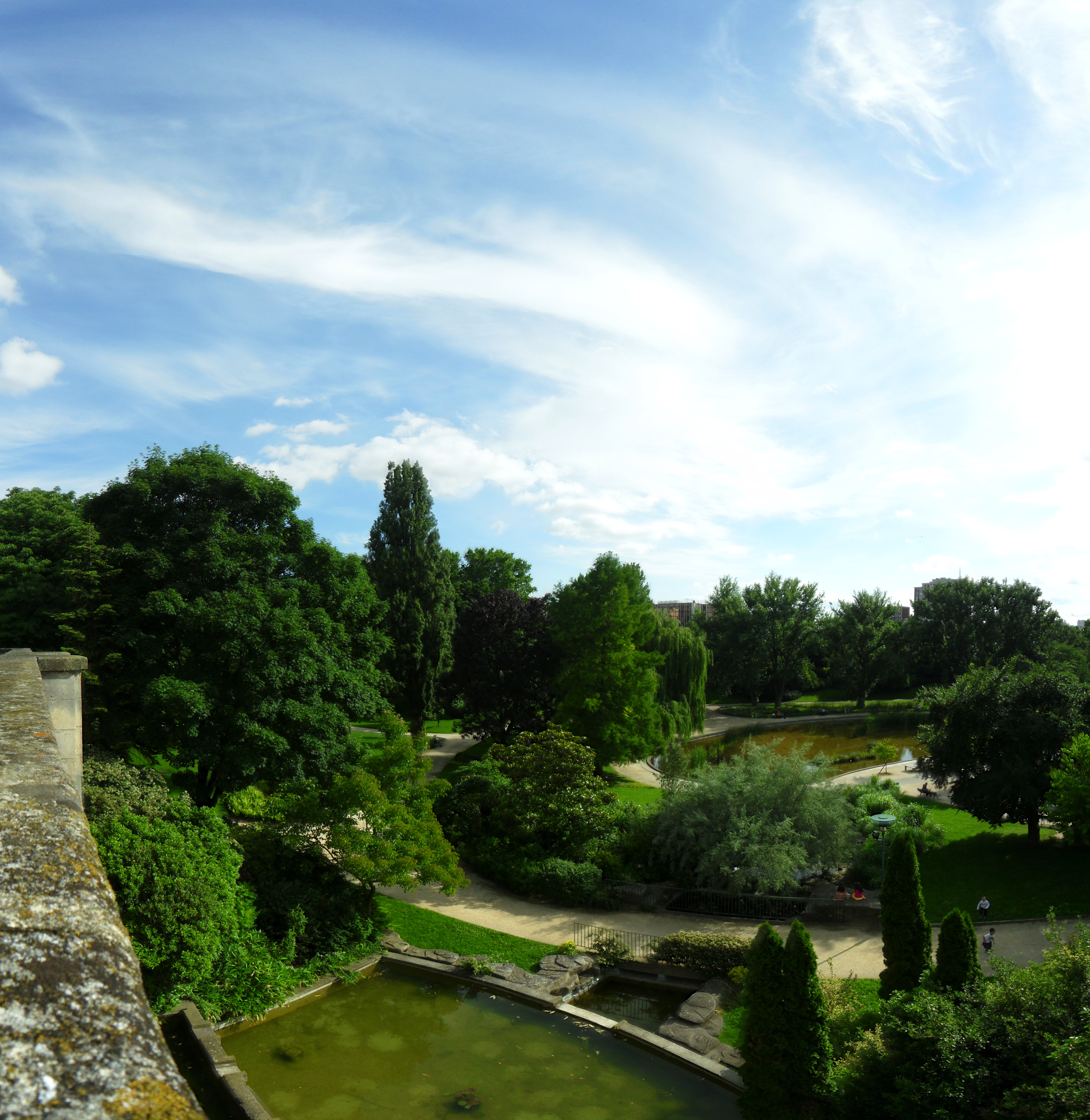
View of the lower park from the terrace

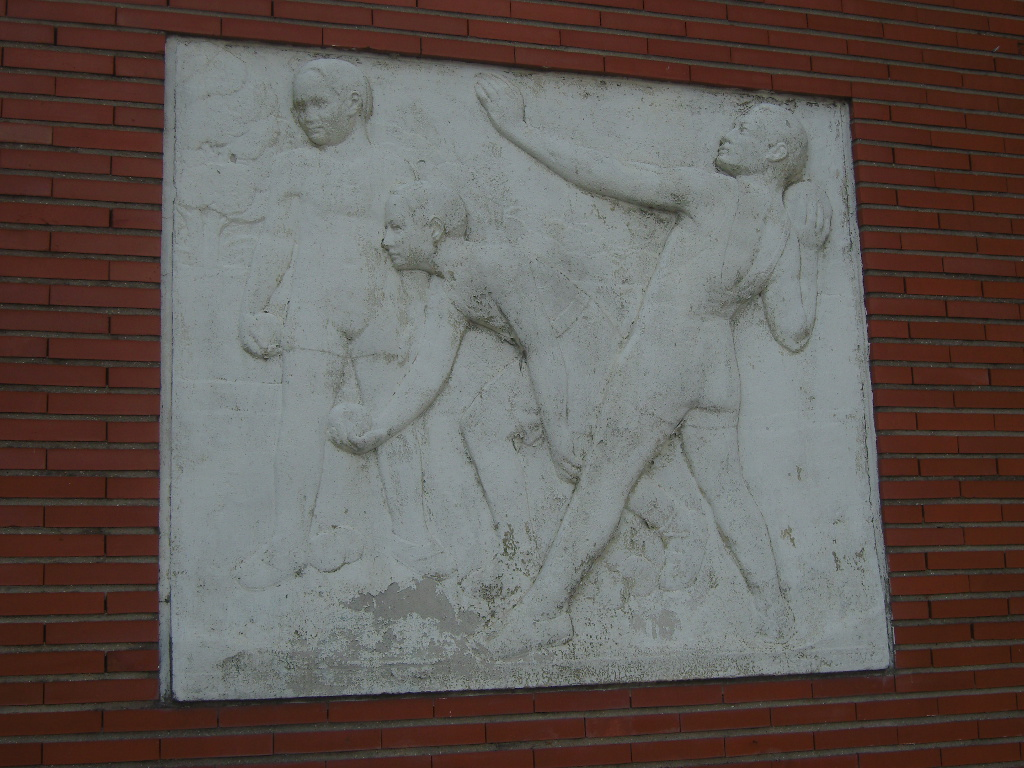
One of the bas-relief sculptures from the 1930s.

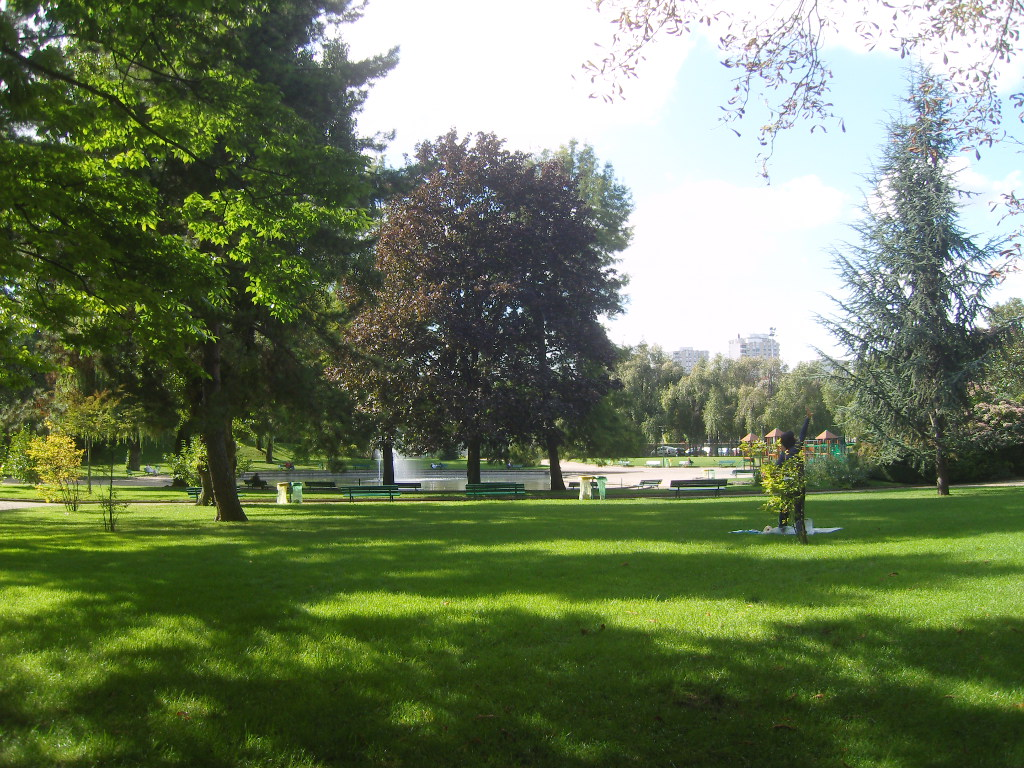
Lawn of the lower park

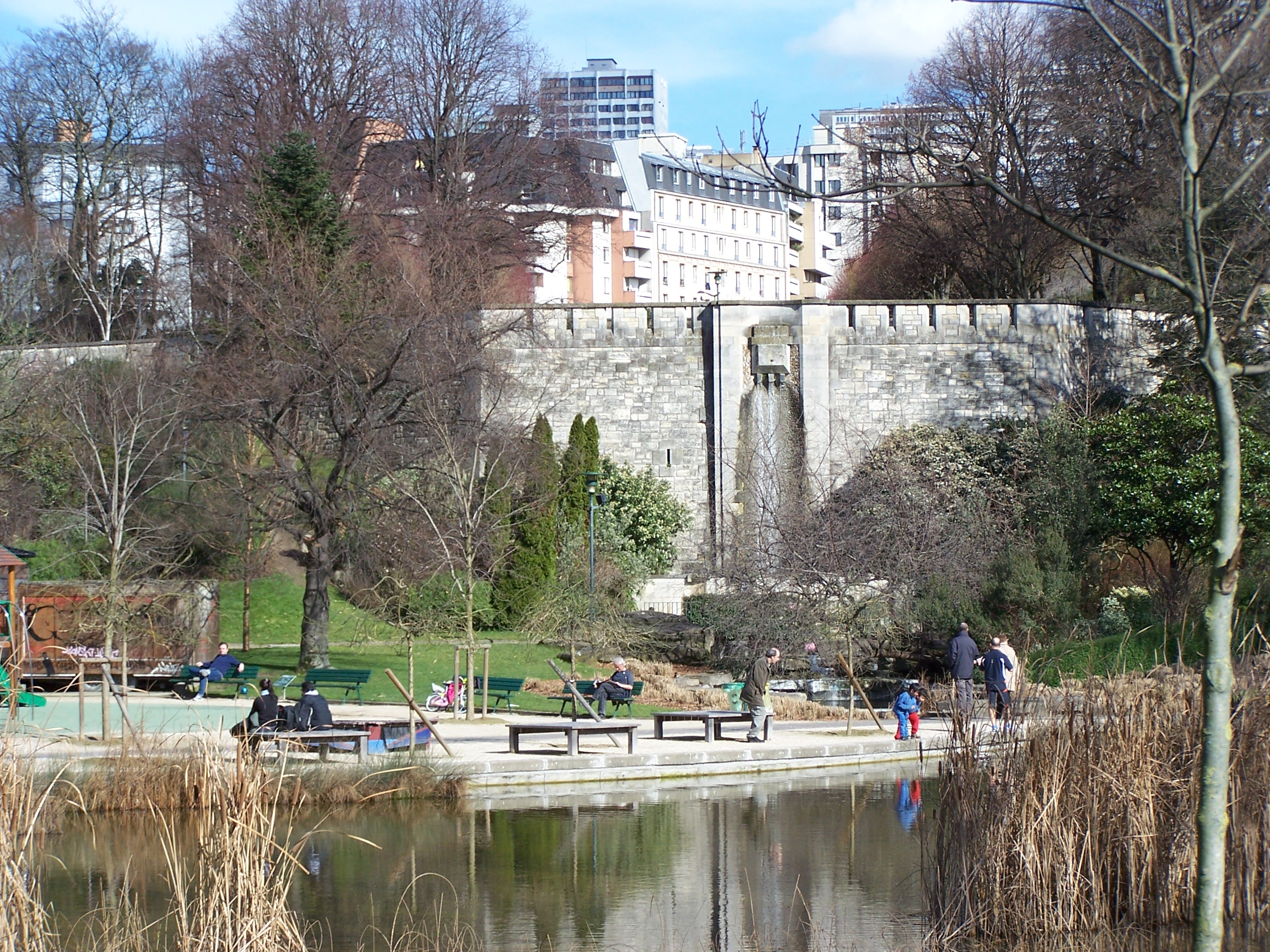
View from the lower park

== See also ==
- 13th arrondissement of Paris
- History of Parks and Gardens of Paris
- List of parks and gardens in Paris
- François Christophe de Kellermann
