= Mairie d'Ivry station =

Paris Métro station in Ivry-sur-Seine

Mairie d'Ivry
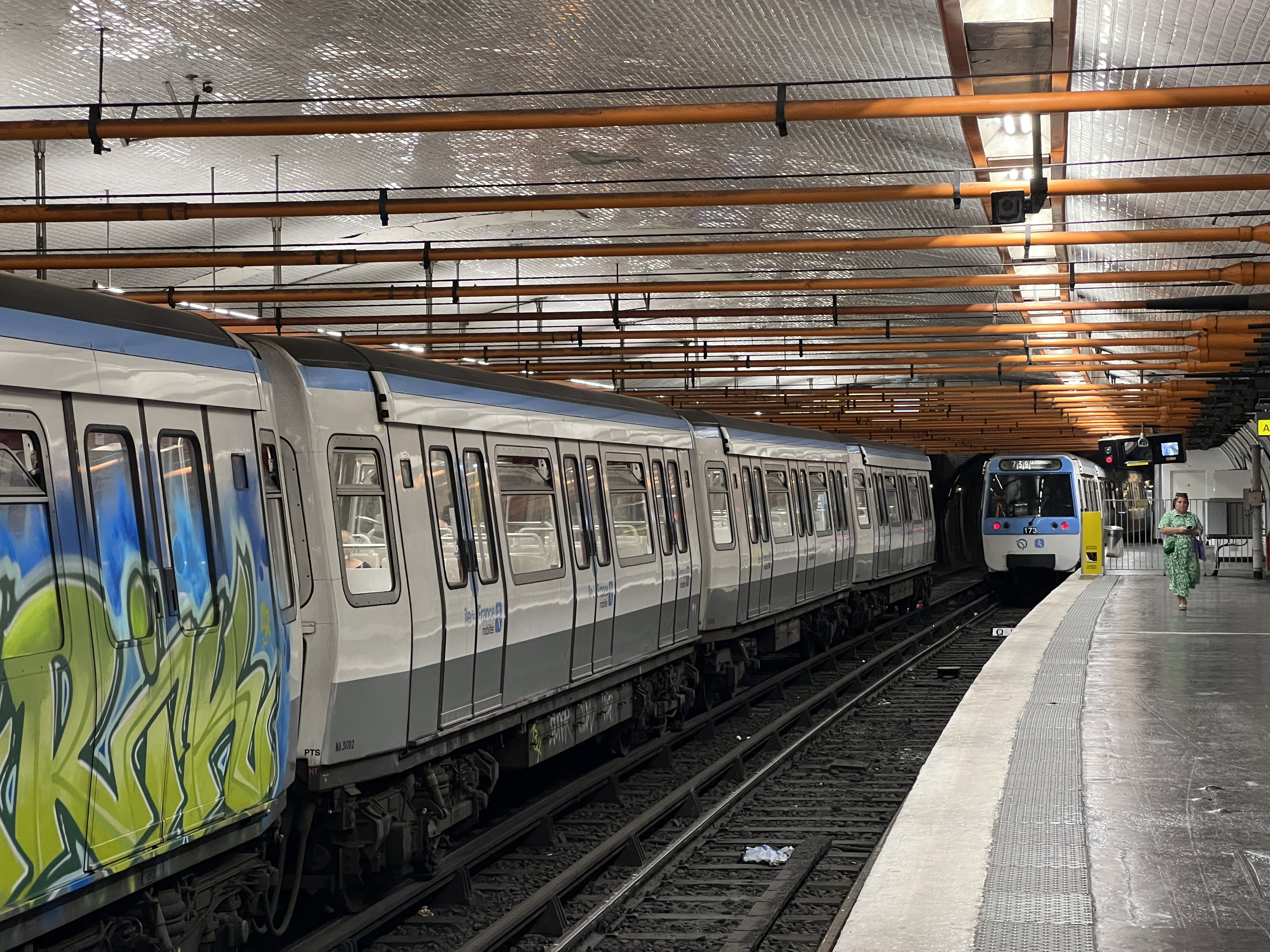
- 2 MF 77 rolling stock with Paris-IDF delivery at Mairie d'Ivry

General information
- Location: Ivry-sur-Seine; Île-de-France; France
- Coordinates: 48°48′40″N 2°23′00″E
- System: Paris Métro station
- Owner: RATP
- Operator: RATP
- Line: Paris Metro Paris Metro Line 7
- Platforms: 2 (1 island platform, 1 side platform)
- Tracks: 3

Construction
- Accessible: no

Other information
- Station code: 26-05
- Fare zone: 2

History
- Opened: 1 May 1946; 80 years ago

Passengers
- 2,042,071 (2021)

Services
Preceding station	Paris Metro	Following station
Terminus	Line 7 Ivry branch	Pierre et Marie Curie towards La Courneuve–8 mai 1945
Location
- Location within Paris

Mairie d'Ivry (French pronunciation: [mɛʁi divʁi]) is the southeastern terminus of Line 7 of the Paris Métro, in the suburban commune of Ivry-sur-Seine.

== History ==
The station opened on 1 May 1946 when the line was extended from Porte d'Ivry and has served as its southeastern terminus since.

As part of the "Un métro + beau" programme by the RATP, the station's corridors were renovated and modernised on 29 June 2005.

In 2019, the station was used by 3,074,561 passengers, making it the 165th busiest of the Métro network out of 302 stations.

In 2020, the station was used by 1,800,848 passengers amidst the COVID-19 pandemic, making it the 137th busiest of the Métro network out of 304 stations.

In 2021, the station was used by 2,042,071 passengers, making it the 174th busiest of the Métro network out of 304 stations.

== Passenger services ==
=== Access ===
The station has three accesses:

- Access 1: Place de la République (with two staircases)
- Access 2: rue Robespierre Centre Commercial (with an ascending escalator)
- Access 3: rue Marat

=== Station layout ===
Street Level
B1	Mezzanine
Platform level	Side platform, doors will open on the right
Platform level	Southbound	← Alighting passengers only
Platform level	Northbound	toward La Courneuve–8 mai 1945 (Pierre et Marie Curie) →
Platform level	Island platform, doors will open on the right, left
Platform level	Northbound	toward La Courneuve–8 mai 1945 (Pierre et Marie Curie) →

=== Platforms ===
The station has a particular arrangement specific to the stations serving or had served as a terminus. It has three tracks and two platforms. The side platform serves as the arrival platform while the island platform serves as the departure platform.

=== Other connections ===
==== RER ====
A remote connection with line C of the RER via Ivry-sur-Seine station is possible, about 650 metres away along avenue Georges-Gosnat.

==== Bus ====
The station is also served by lines 125, 132, 182, and 323 of the RATP bus network.

== Nearby ==
- Église Saint-Pierre-Saint-Paul d'Ivry-sur-Seine
- Cimetière ancien d'Ivry-sur-Seine

== Gallery ==
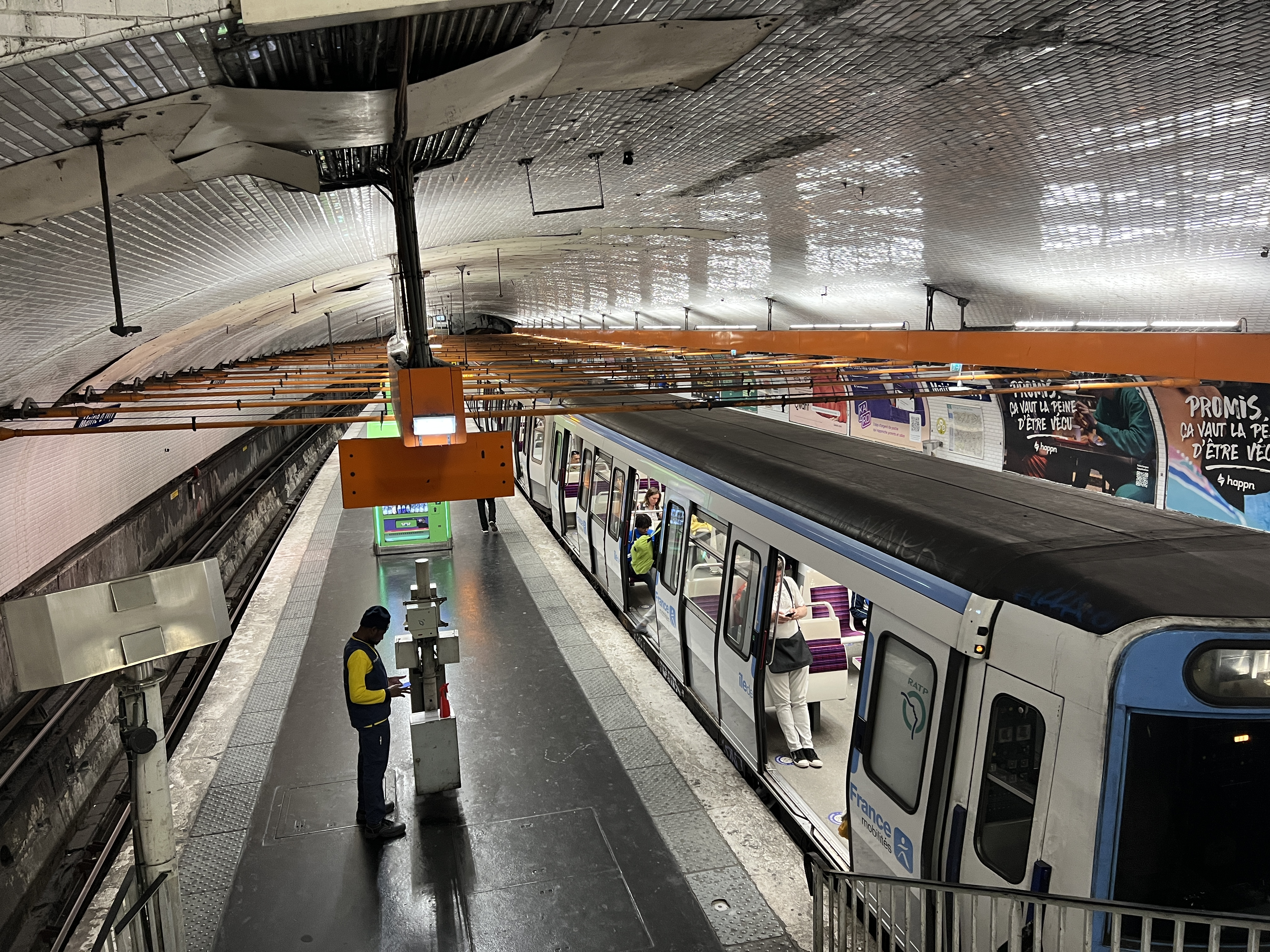
Island platform

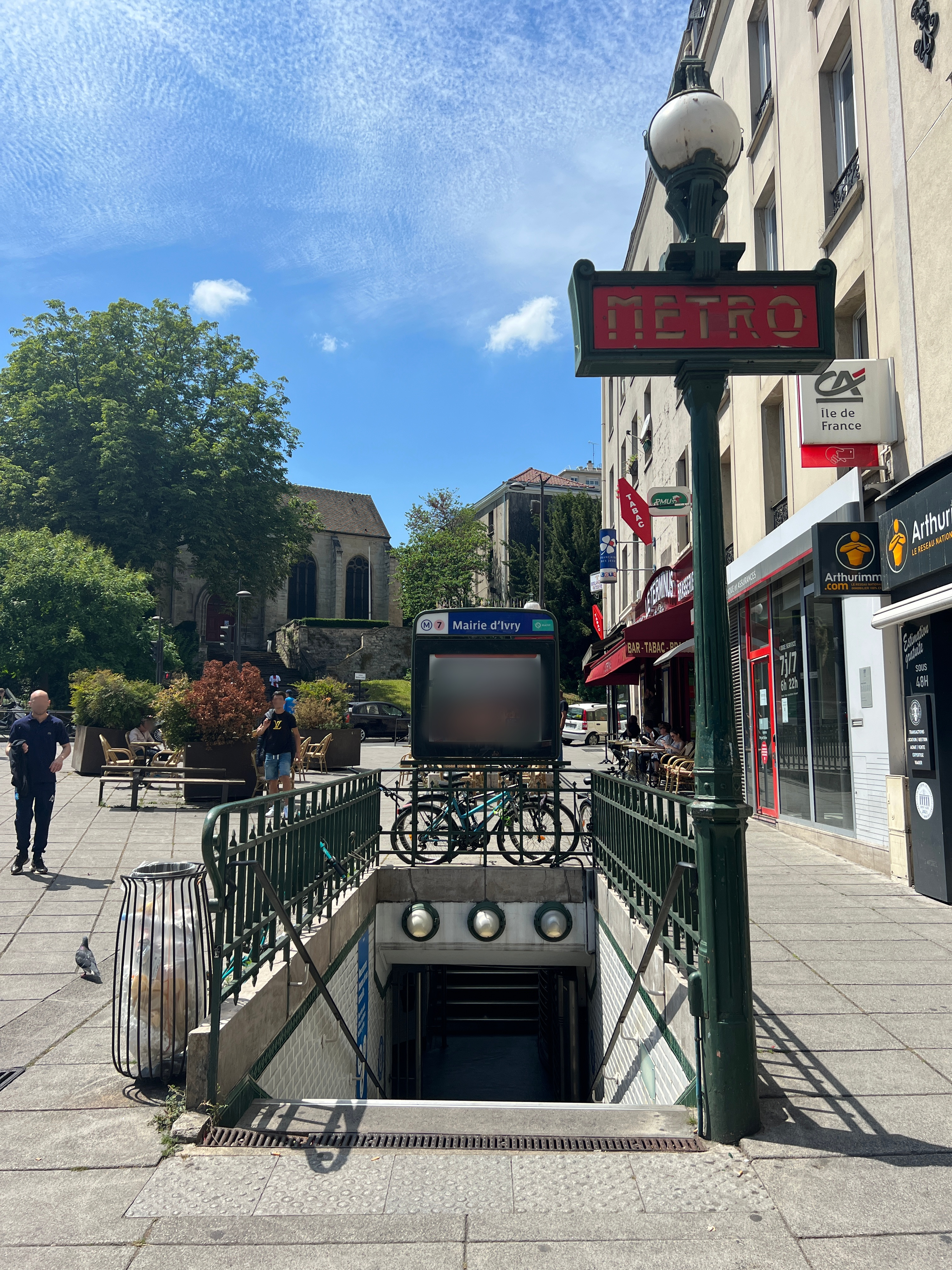
Access 1

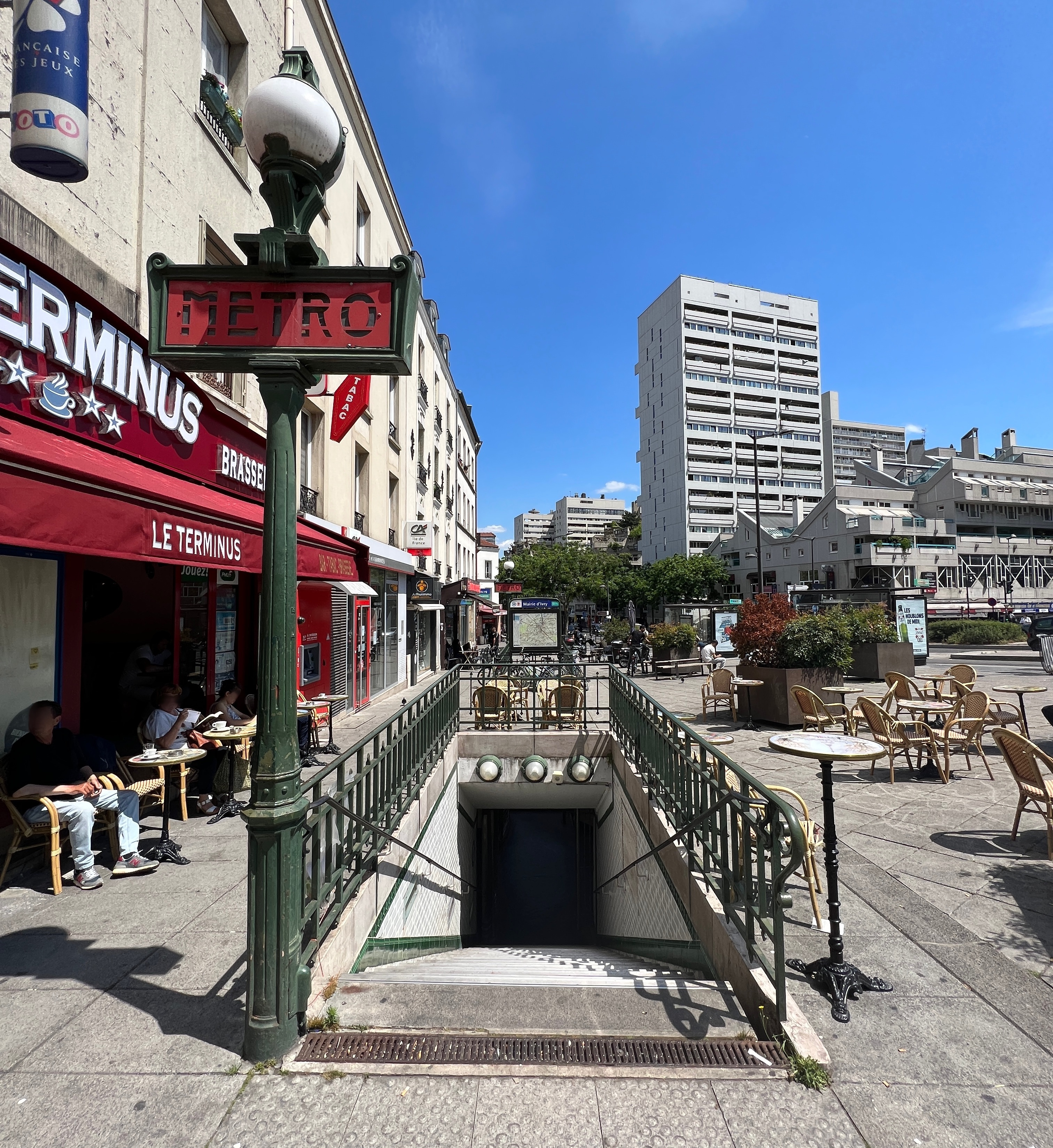
Access 1

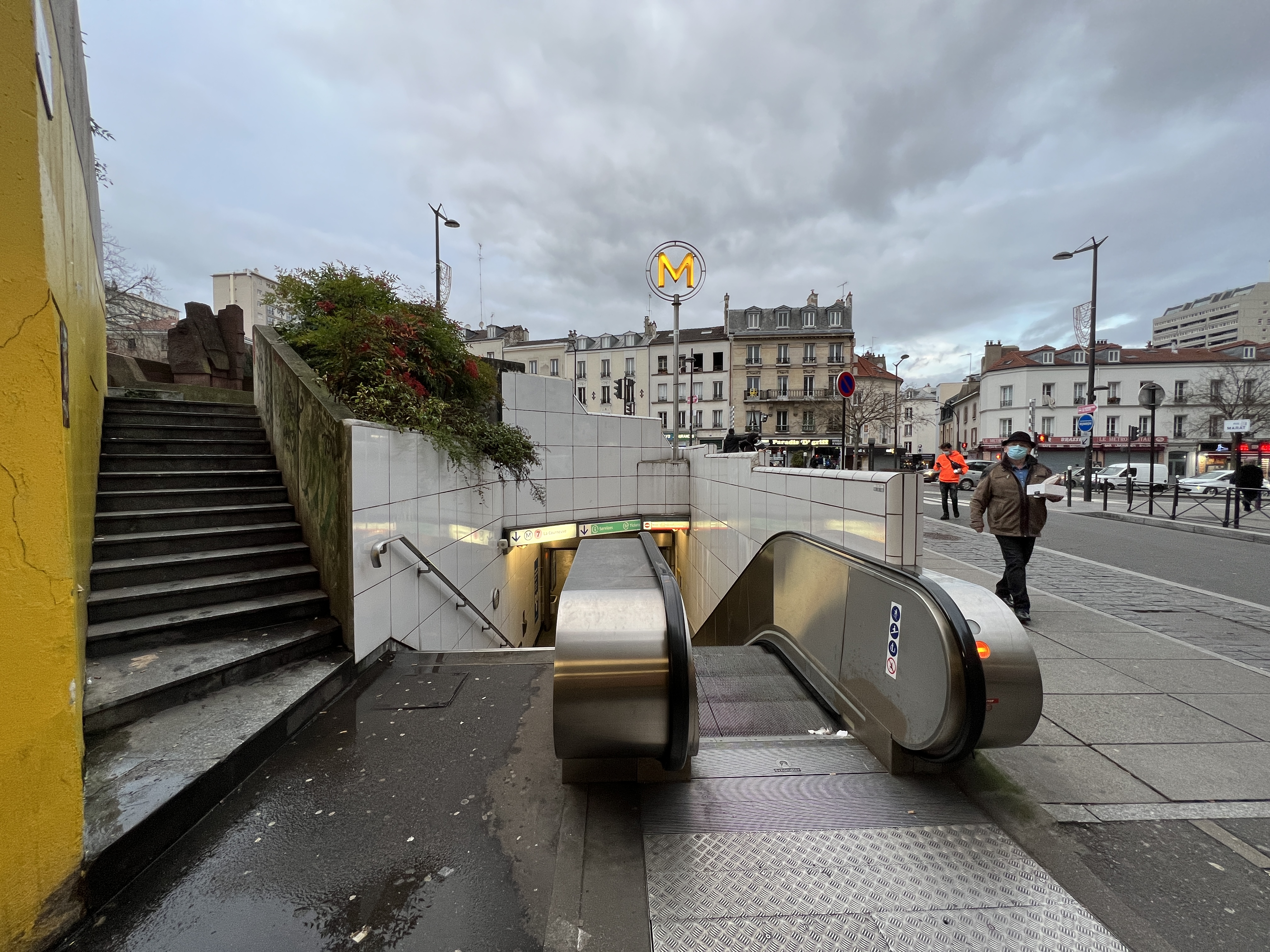
Access 2

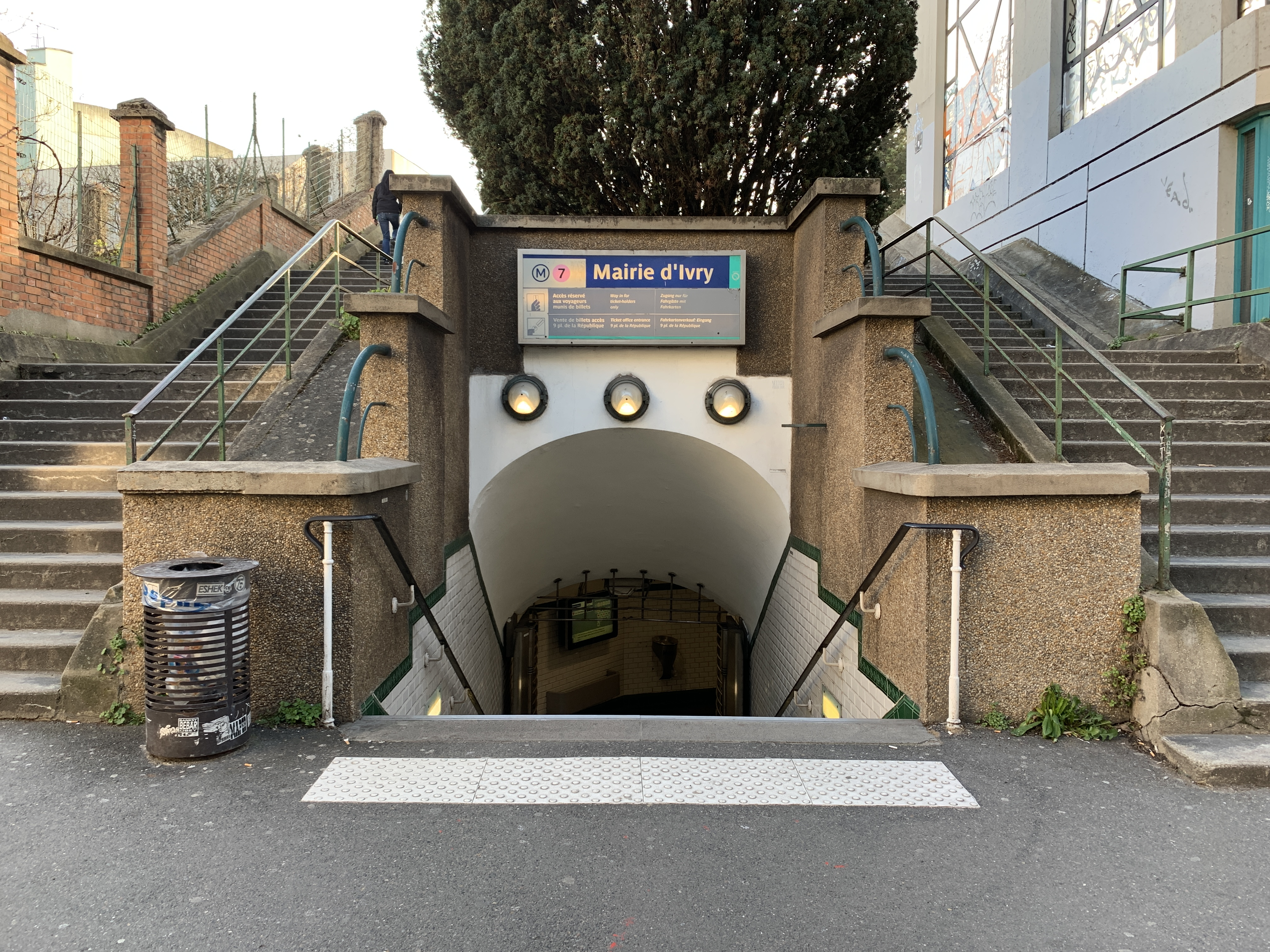
Access 3
