= Boulevard de Strasbourg (disambiguation) =

Boulevard de Strasbourg is a major thoroughfare in Paris, France.

Boulevard de Strasbourg may also refer to other streets in France:

- Boulevard de Strasbourg, Marseille
- Boulevard de Strasbourg, Nogent-sur-Marne
- Boulevard de Strasbourg, Toulon
- Boulevard de Strasbourg, Toulouse
