= Place du Château d'Eau =

Place du Château d'Eau may refer to:

- The former name of the Place de la République
- Château d'Eau station, a Paris Metro station
