= Boulevard de Sébastopol =

Boulevard in Paris, France

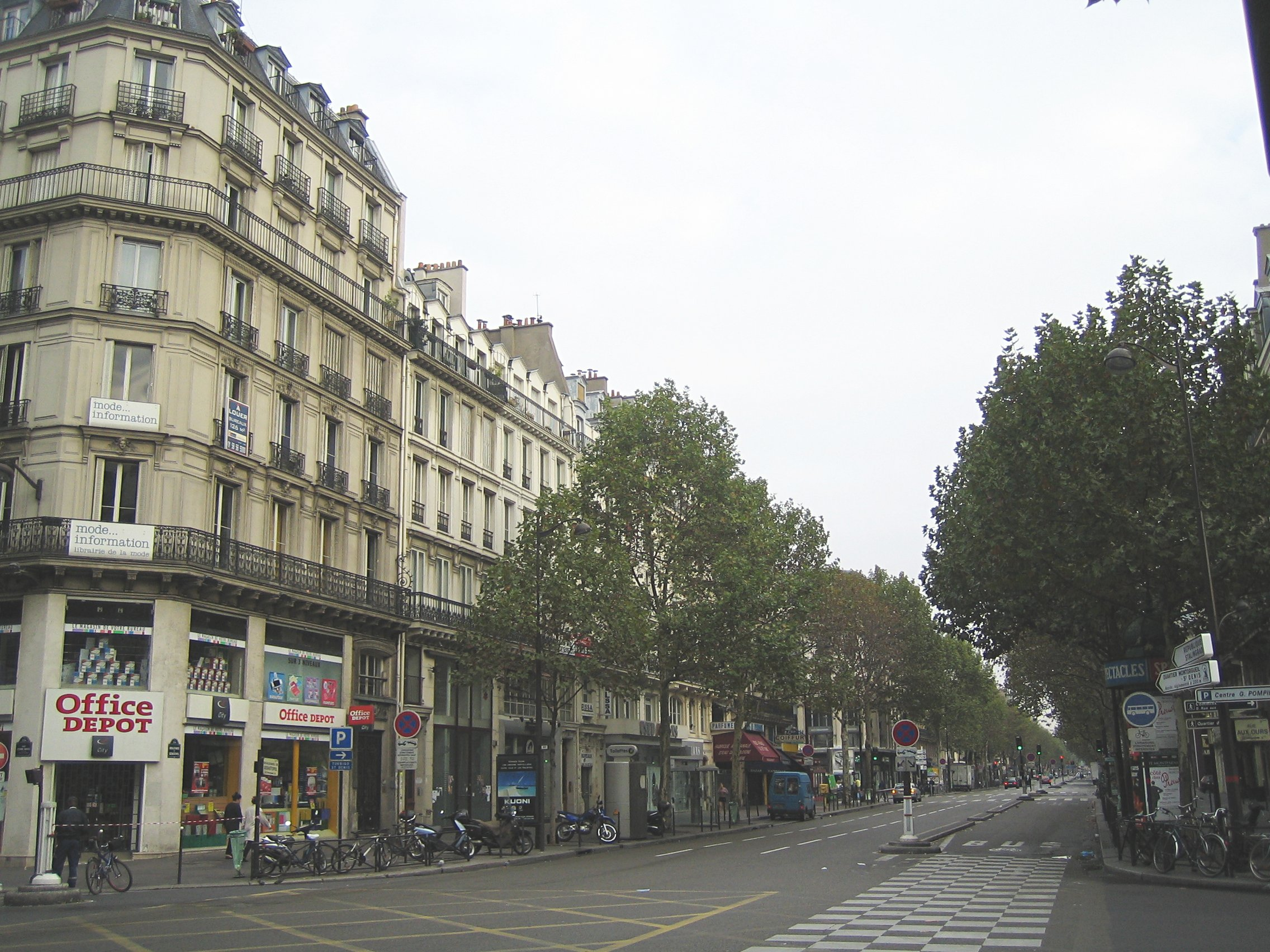
- Boulevard de Sébastopol today

- Location within Paris
- Namesake: Siege of Sevastopol
- Length: 1,332 m (4,370 ft)
- Width: 30 m (98 ft)
- Arrondissement: 1st, 2nd, 3rd, 4th
- Quarter: Saint-Germain l'Auxerrois . Halles . Bonne Nouvelle . Sainte-Avoye . Arts et Métiers . Saint-Merri
- Coordinates: 48°51′52″N 2°21′5″E
- From: avenue Victoria
- To: boulevard Saint-Denis

Construction
- Completion: Déc. du 29 septembre 1854 (UP). Déc. du 23 août 1858 : 1° raccordement des côtés impair et pair avec le côté pair de la rue Greneta; 2° au droit du n° 107 (partie); 3° au droit du square Chautemps.
- Denomination: Déc. du 25 septembre 1855.

The Boulevard de Sébastopol (French pronunciation: [bulvaʁ də sebastɔpɔl]) is an important roadway in Paris, France, which serves to delimit the 1st and 2nd arrondissements from the 3rd and 4th arrondissements of the city.

The boulevard is 1.3 km in length, starting from the Place du Châtelet and ending at the boulevard Saint-Denis, when it becomes the Boulevard de Strasbourg. The boulevard is a main thoroughfare and consists of four vehicular lanes, one of which is reserved for buses.

Although the road is lined with some shops and restaurants, its importance is that of a thoroughfare running north–south in central Paris. It separates the Parisian neighborhoods Le Marais from Les Halles.

Located near the Metro stations: Châtelet, Strasbourg – Saint-Denis and Réaumur Sébastopol.

== History ==
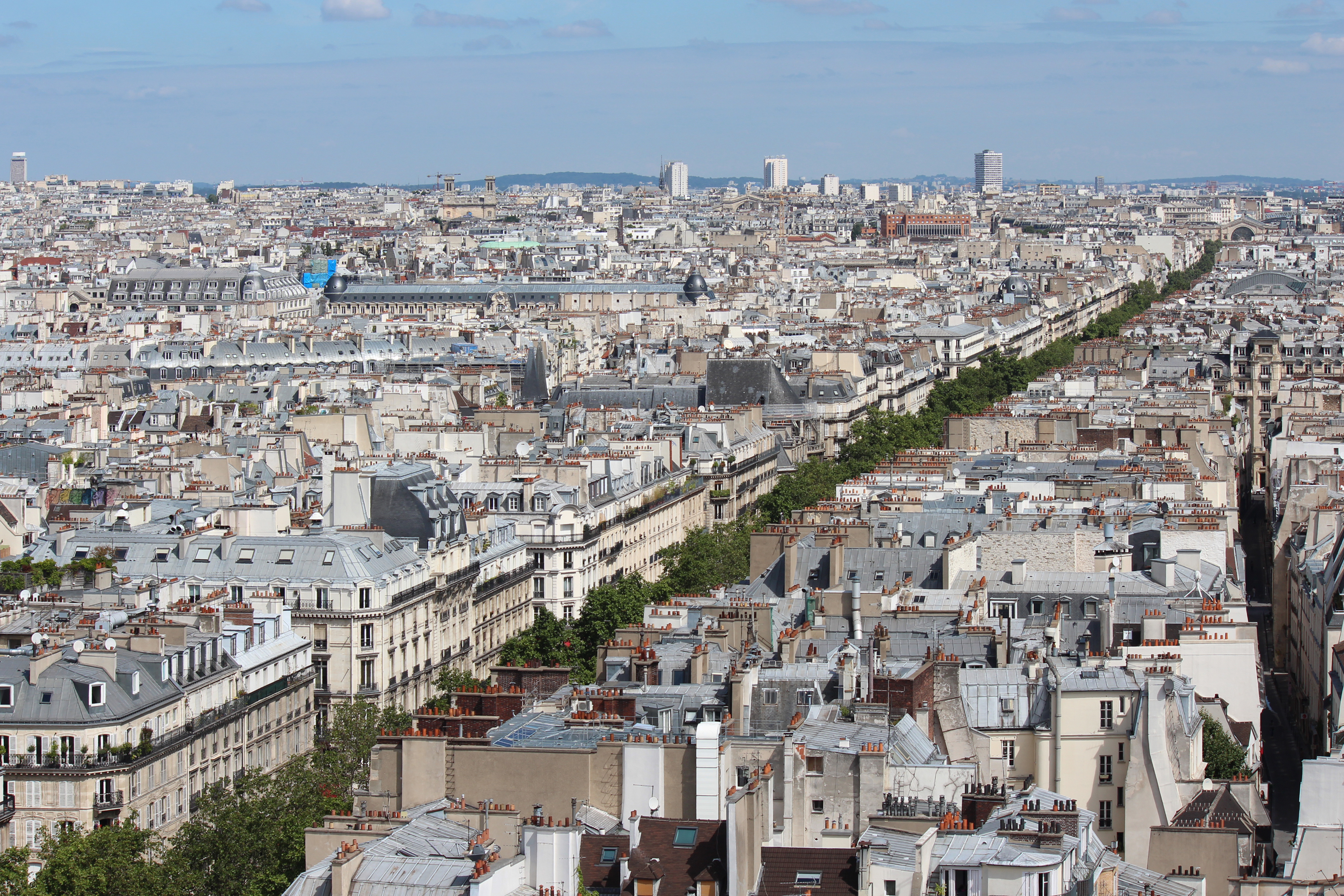
An aerial view of the boulevard, from the Tour St-Jacques

The boulevard de Sébastopol is one of the most important roads opened up by the Baron Haussmann during his transformation of Paris in the 1850s. It was conceived as a major artery running a north–south axis across Paris, leading to the Gare de l'Est.

The road was christened Boulevard du Centre when it was opened in 1854. Following the French victory in September 1855 at the port of Sevastopol during the Crimean War, it was given its current name.

For several years, the name belonged to the road known since 1867 as Boulevard Saint-Michel, along the Rive Gauche up to Rue Cujas.

Napoleon III, when touring Paris with Tsar Alexander II of Russia in 1867 during the Exposition Universelle, had decided on the Boulevard de Sébastopol as a peaceful area to bring his foreign guest through. But Louis-Napoleon was disappointed, as shouts from crowds surrounding their vehicle could be heard, "Long live Poland!"

== See also ==
- Siege of Sevastopol (1854–1855)
- Boulevards of Paris
