= Boulevard de Strasbourg =

Boulevard in Paris, France

Coordinates: 48°52′25″N 2°21′24″E

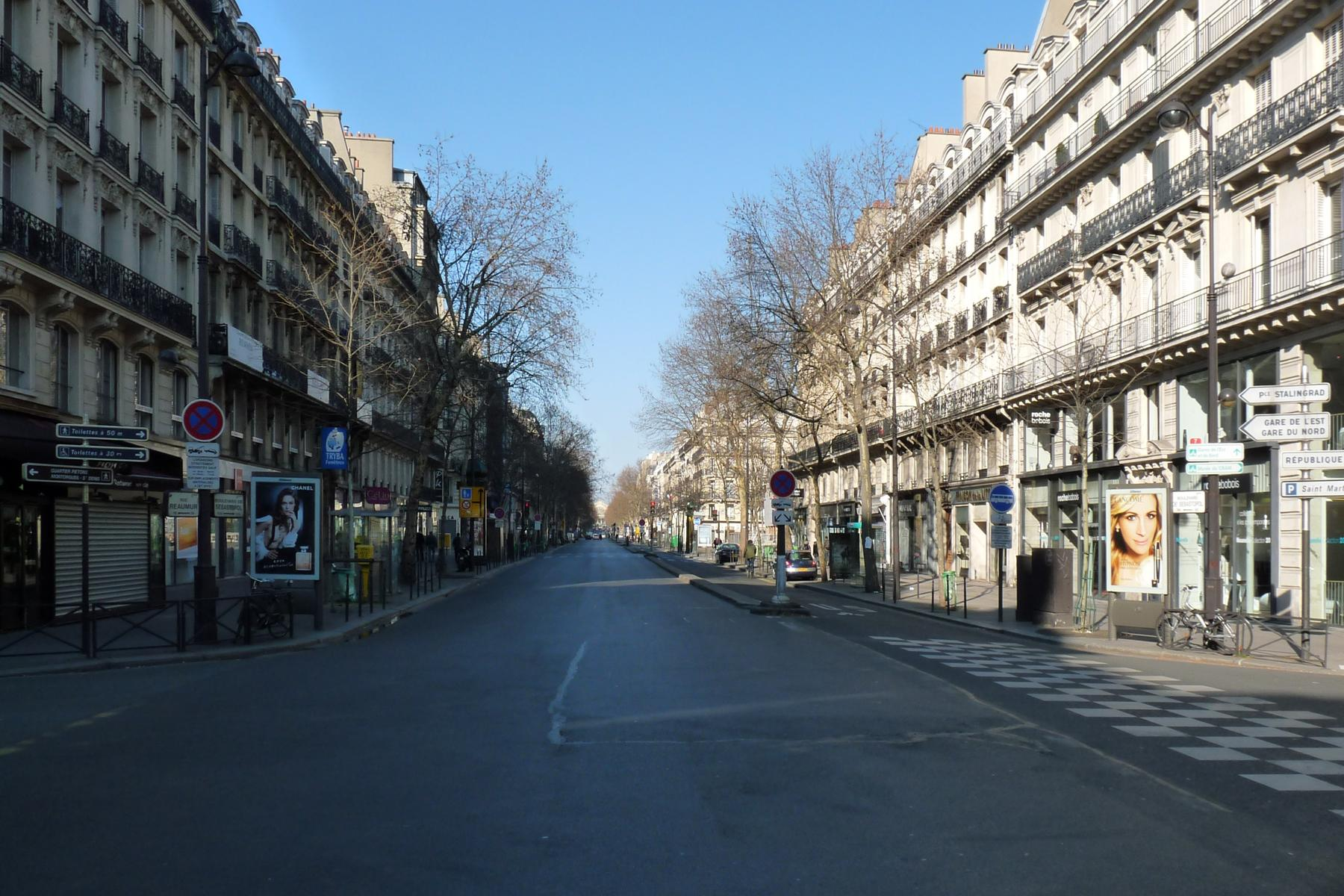
View of the Boulevard de Strasbourg

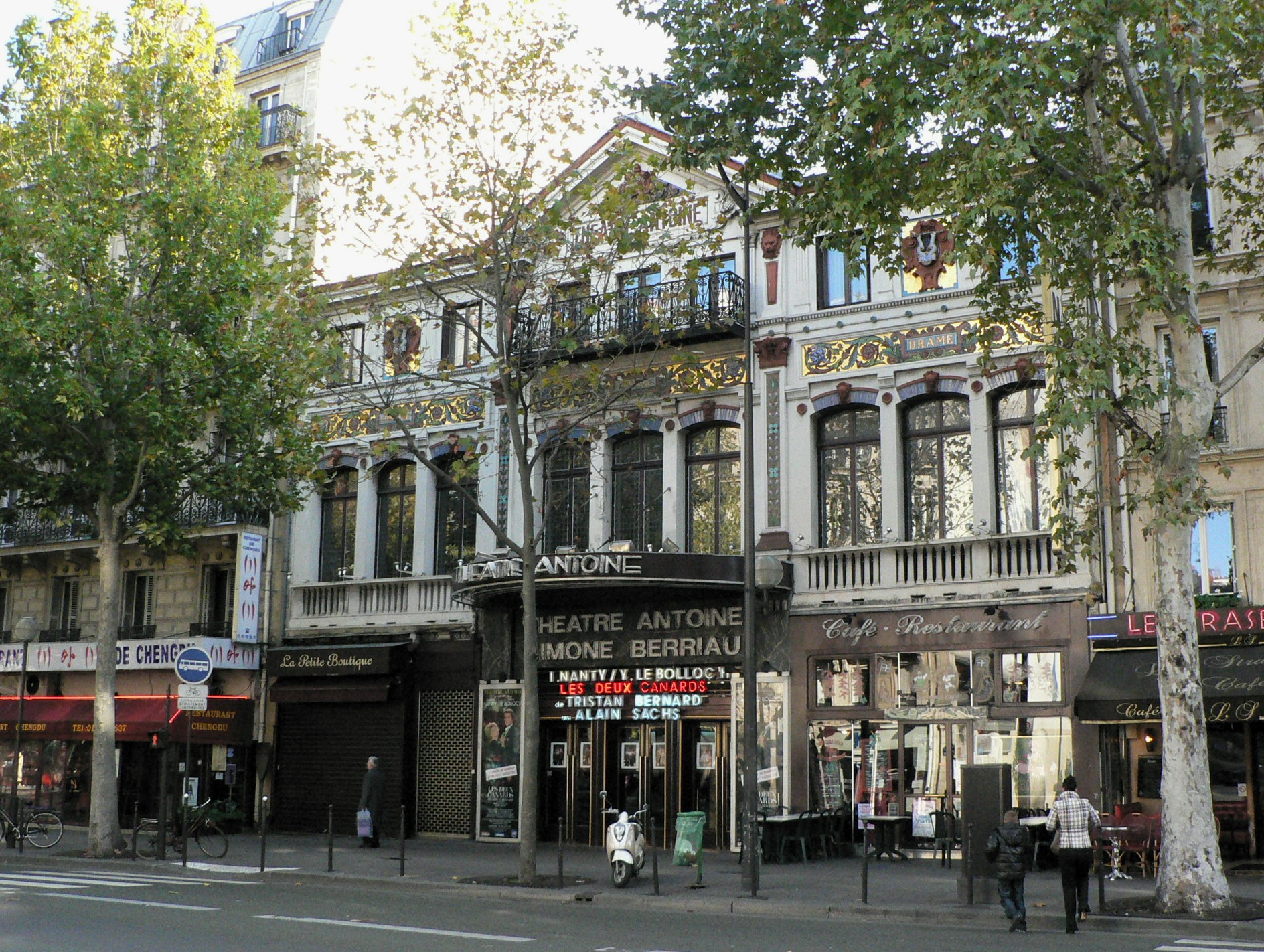
Théâtre Antoine-Simone Berriau

The Boulevard de Strasbourg (French pronunciation: [bulvaʁ də stʁasbuʁ]) is a major thoroughfare in Paris, France. Located in the 10th arrondissement, it begins at 7 Boulevard Saint-Denis and ends at 7 Rue du 8-Mai-1945. It extends the Boulevard de Sebastopol northwards, leading to the Gare de l'Est. Its length is 775 metres and it has a minimum width of 30 metres.

== History ==
The Boulevard de Strasbourg was designed by Georges-Eugène Haussmann. The principle of its creation was established by a decree of 10 March 1852 and was approved by the decree of 8 November 1852. It is named after the capital of Alsace, Strasbourg. It is so called because it was built by Baron Haussmann to connect the Place du Châtelet with the Gare de l'Est, whence trains to Strasbourg depart.

The creation of the Boulevard de Strasbourg was one of the streets envisaged in conjunction with the new train stations. Its special significance was that it could potentially be continued straight toward the city centre, forming a major artery into the heart of the city, perpendicular to the Seine.

== Transportation ==
The Boulevard de Strasbourg is served by Métro stations Strasbourg – Saint-Denis, Château d'Eau and Gare de l'Est.
