= Château-Landon station =

Metro station in Paris, France

Château-Landon
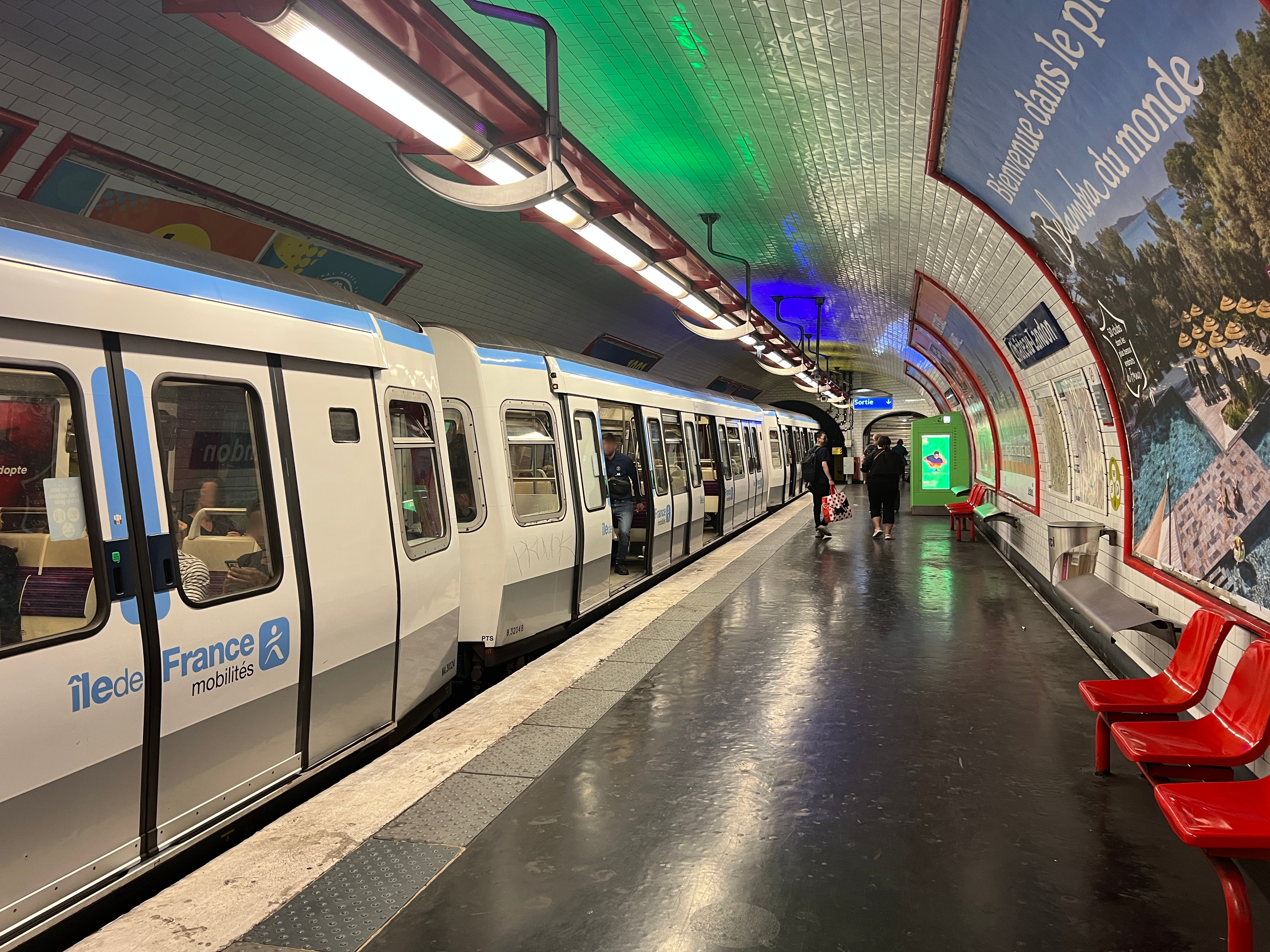

General information
- Location: 10th arrondissement of Paris; Île-de-France; France
- Coordinates: 48°52′42″N 2°21′43″E
- System: Paris Métro station
- Owner: RATP
- Operator: RATP

Other information
- Fare zone: 1

History
- Opened: 5 November 1910; 115 years ago

Services
Preceding station	Paris Metro	Following station
Gare de l'Est towards Villejuif–Louis Aragon or Mairie d'Ivry	Line 7	Louis Blanc towards La Courneuve–8 mai 1945
Location
- Location within Paris

Château-Landon (French pronunciation: [ʃɑto lɑ̃dɔ̃]) is a station on Line 7 of the Paris Métro in the 10th arrondissement.

== History ==
The station was opened on 5 November 1910 as part of the first section of the line from Opéra to Porte de la Villette. It is named after the Rue Château-Landon, a street which was built on property once owned by a family from Château-Landon in Seine-et-Marne. The street is on the alignment of the Roman road from Lutetia towards the North via Saint-Denis.

It was planned to become the end of the future new line (created from the merger of line 3bis and line 7bis). It is also planned to build an underground pedestrian connection to the RER Line E station of Magenta, which would also link to the Gare du Nord and the Gare de l'Est.

== Passenger services ==
=== Access ===
Apart from the direct access from the platforms of the Gare de l'Est, the station has only one access, in front of 188 Rue du Faubourg-Saint-Martin. A second (exit-only by escalator) exit was located a few metres south of the current entrance but was condemned in the early 1990s.

=== Station layout ===
Street Level

B1	Connecting level

Line 7 platforms	Side platform, doors will open on the right
Line 7 platforms	Southbound	← toward Villejuif – Louis Aragon or Mairie d'Ivry (Gare de l'Est)
Line 7 platforms	Northbound	toward La Courneuve–8 mai 1945 (Louis Blanc) →
Line 7 platforms	Side platform, doors will open on the right

=== Platforms ===
Château-Landon has two platforms separated by the two metro tracks, which are themselves separated by a wall forming two half-stations each with an elliptical vault. The decoration is in the Ouï-dire style of red. The lighting canopy, of the same colour, is supported by curved hangers in the shape of a scythe. The direct lighting is white, and the indirect lighting, projected on the vault, is multicoloured. The white ceramic tiles are flat and cover the corridors' walls, vault, tunnel exits and outlets. The advertising frames are red and cylindrical, and the name of the station is written with the Parisine font on enamelled plates. The platforms are equipped with red Motte-style seats.

== Gallery ==
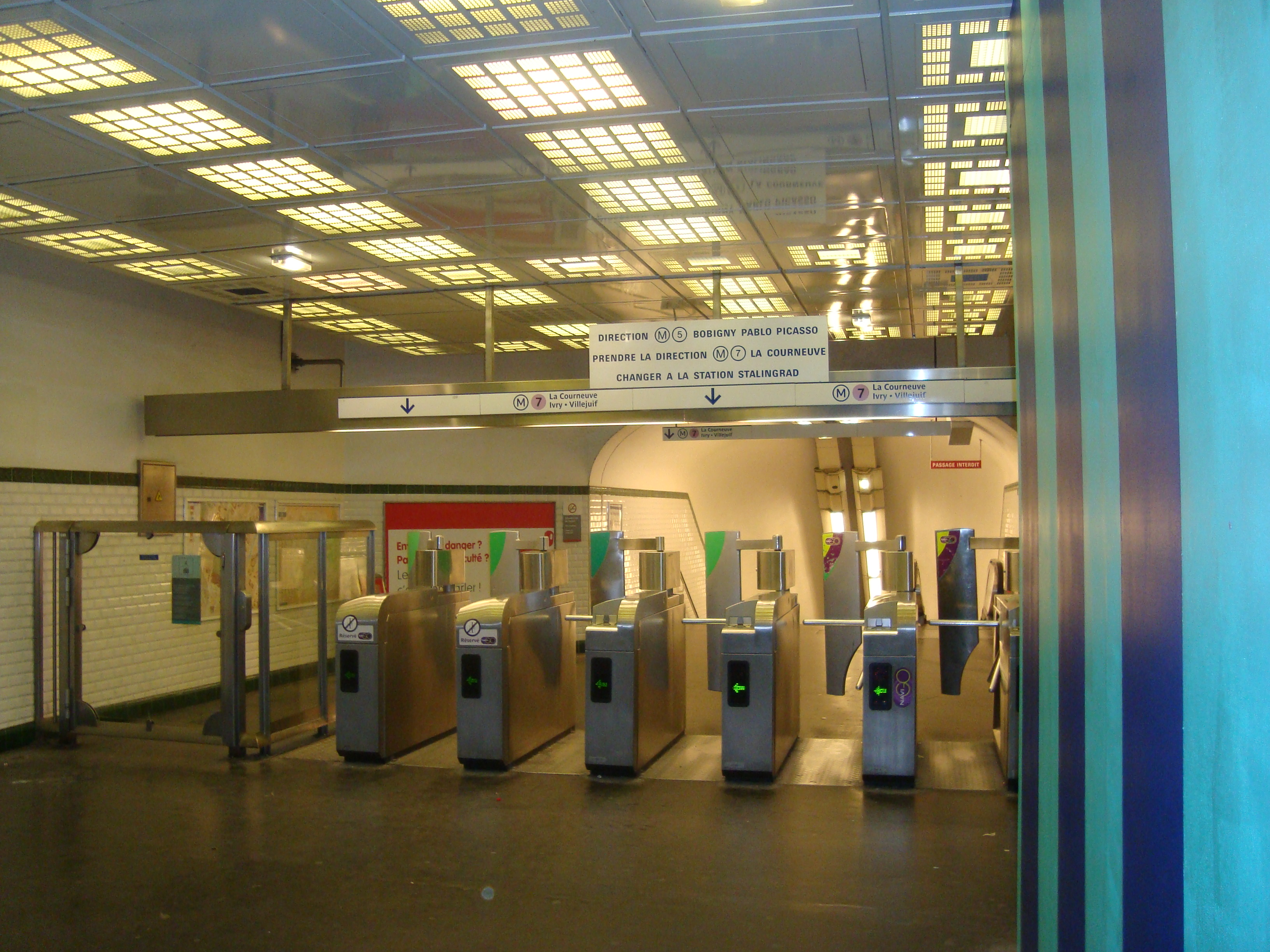
Château-Landon ticket hall
