= Étienne Marcel station =

Metro station in Paris, France

Étienne Marcel
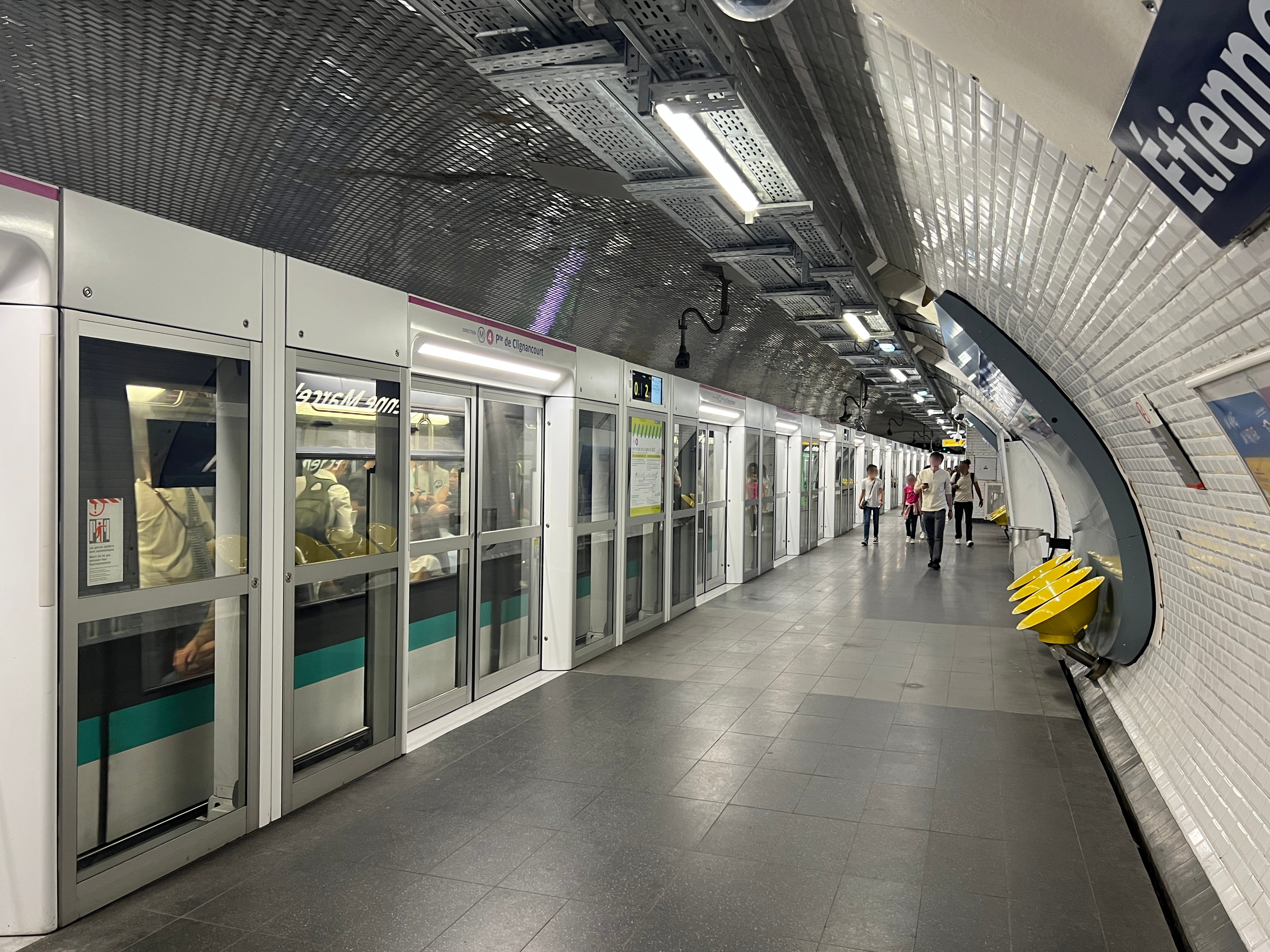
- The station's platforms after the installation of platform screen doors in 2022

General information
- Location: 14, Rue de Turbigo; 1st arrondissement of Paris; Île-de-France; France
- Coordinates: 48°51′51″N 2°21′02″E
- Owner: RATP
- Operator: RATP

Other information
- Fare zone: 1

History
- Opened: 21 April 1908

Services
Preceding station	Paris Metro	Following station
Les Halles towards Bagneux–Lucie Aubrac	Line 4	Réaumur–Sébastopol towards Porte de Clignancourt
Location
- Location within Paris

Étienne Marcel (French pronunciation: [etjɛn maʁsɛl]) is a station on Line 4 of the Paris Métro. It is located in the northeastern part of the 1st arrondissement.

== Location ==
The station is located under the Rue de Turbigo, at the level of Rue Étienne-Marcel.

== History ==
The station was opened on 21 April 1908 as part of the first section of the line from Châtelet to Porte de Clignancourt. It takes its name from Rue Étienne-Marcel, which is named for Étienne Marcel, a 14th-century revolutionary and provost of the merchants under John II.

Nearby are the Saint-Eustache church and the Louvre Post Office, which is the only post office in France open nearly 24 hours a day (except between 6:20 and 7:20 a.m.).

In 2019, 2,676,549 riders entered this station, which places it in 195th position for metro stations out of 302.

== Passenger services ==
=== Access ===
The station has only one exit (a monument historique) that leads to 14 Rue de Turbigo.

=== Station layout ===
Street Level

B1	Mezzanine for platform connection

Line 4 platform level	Side platform with PSDs, doors will open on the right
Line 4 platform level	Northbound	← toward Porte de Clignancourt (Réaumur–Sébastopol)
Line 4 platform level	Southbound	toward Bagneux–Lucie Aubrac (Les Halles) →
Line 4 platform level	Side platform with PSDs, doors will open on the right

=== Platforms ===
Étienne Marcel is a standard configuration station with two platforms separated by the metro tracks. Its vault is elliptical. As part of the automation of Line 4, its platforms have been upgraded with platform screen doors. These were installed between October and November 2019.

=== Bus connections ===
The station is served by line 29 of the RATP bus network.

== Gallery ==
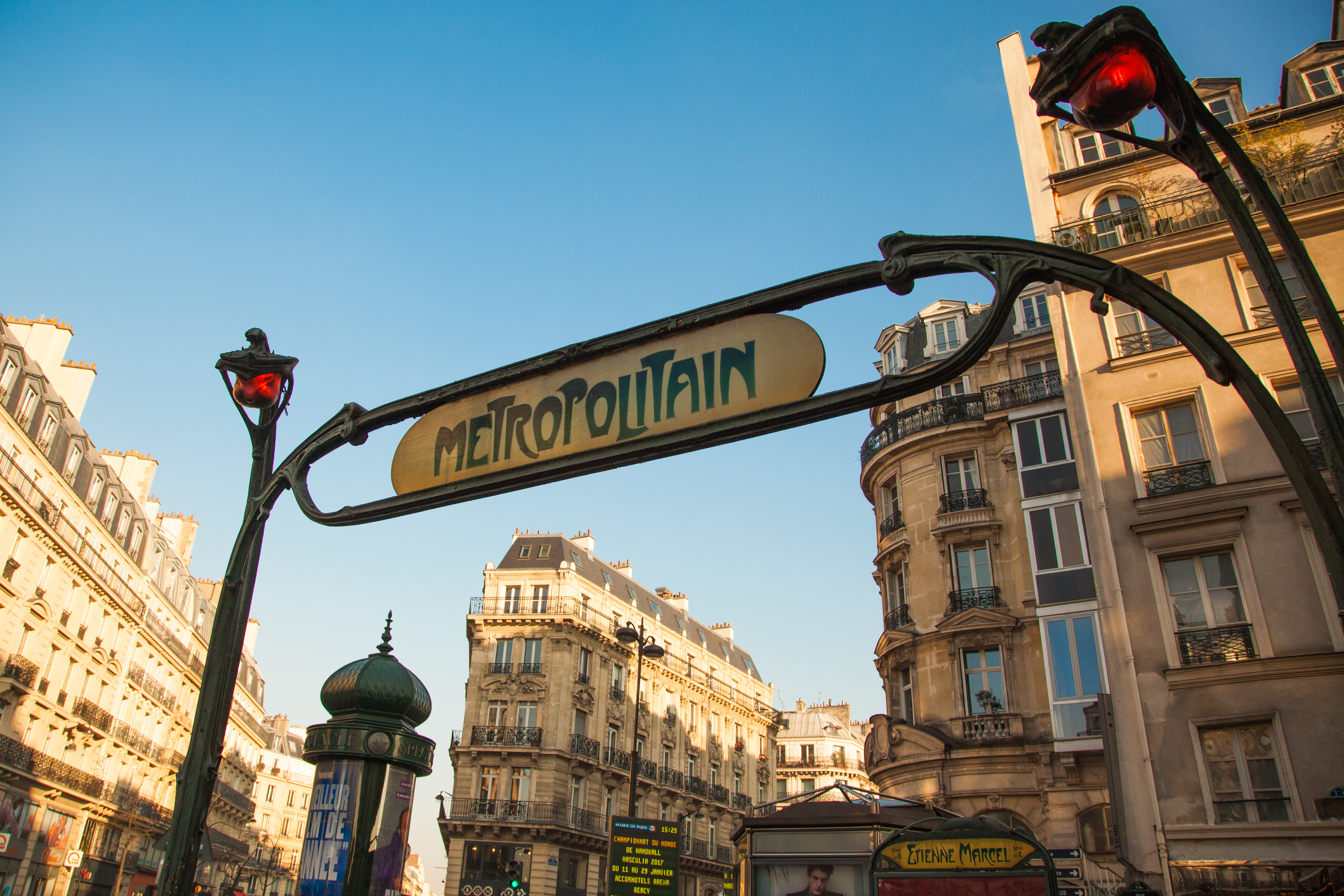
Station entrance

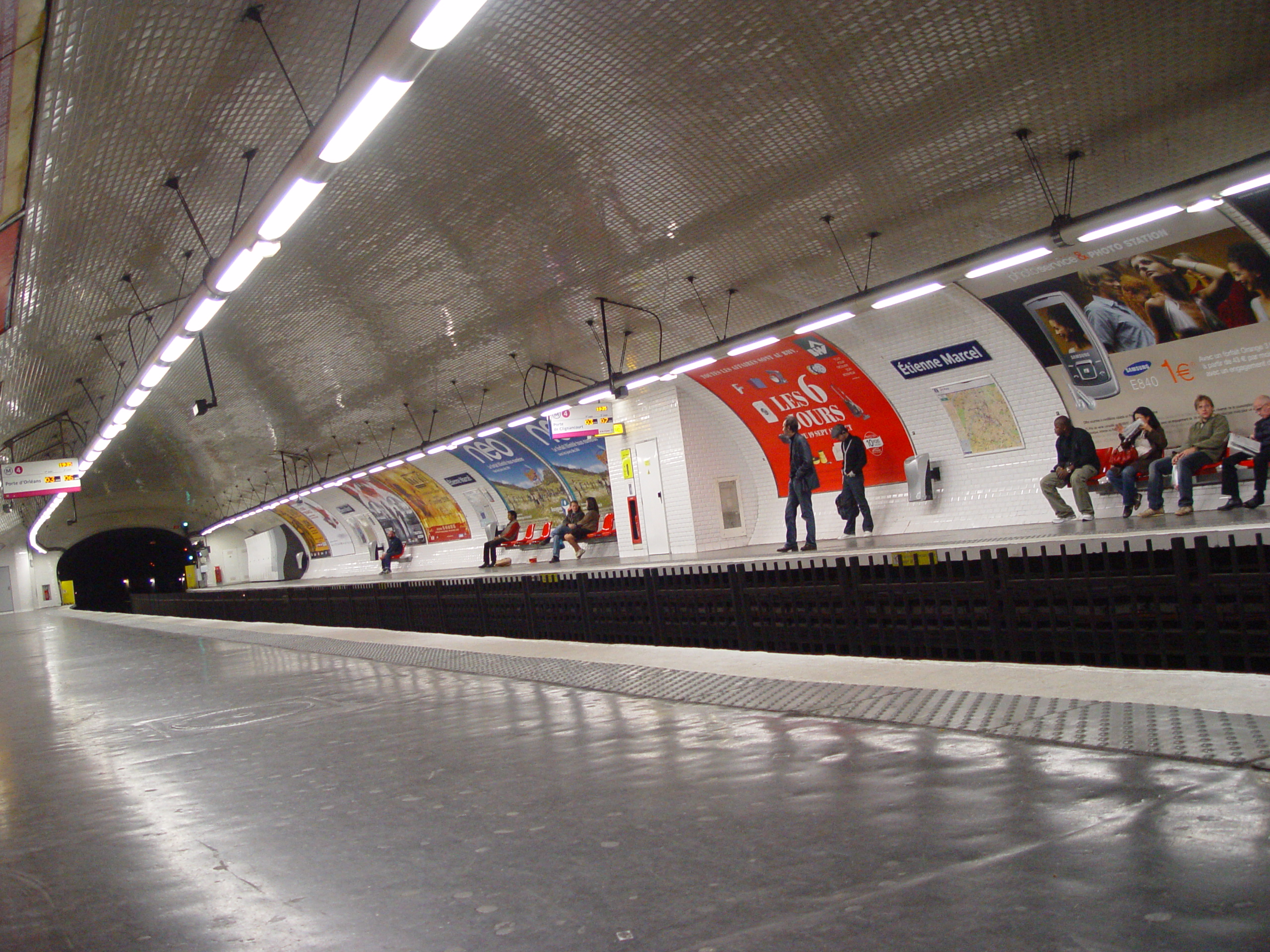
Platforms at Étienne Marcel prior to installation of automatic platform gates
