= Réaumur–Sébastopol station =

Metro station in Paris, France

Réaumur–Sébastopol
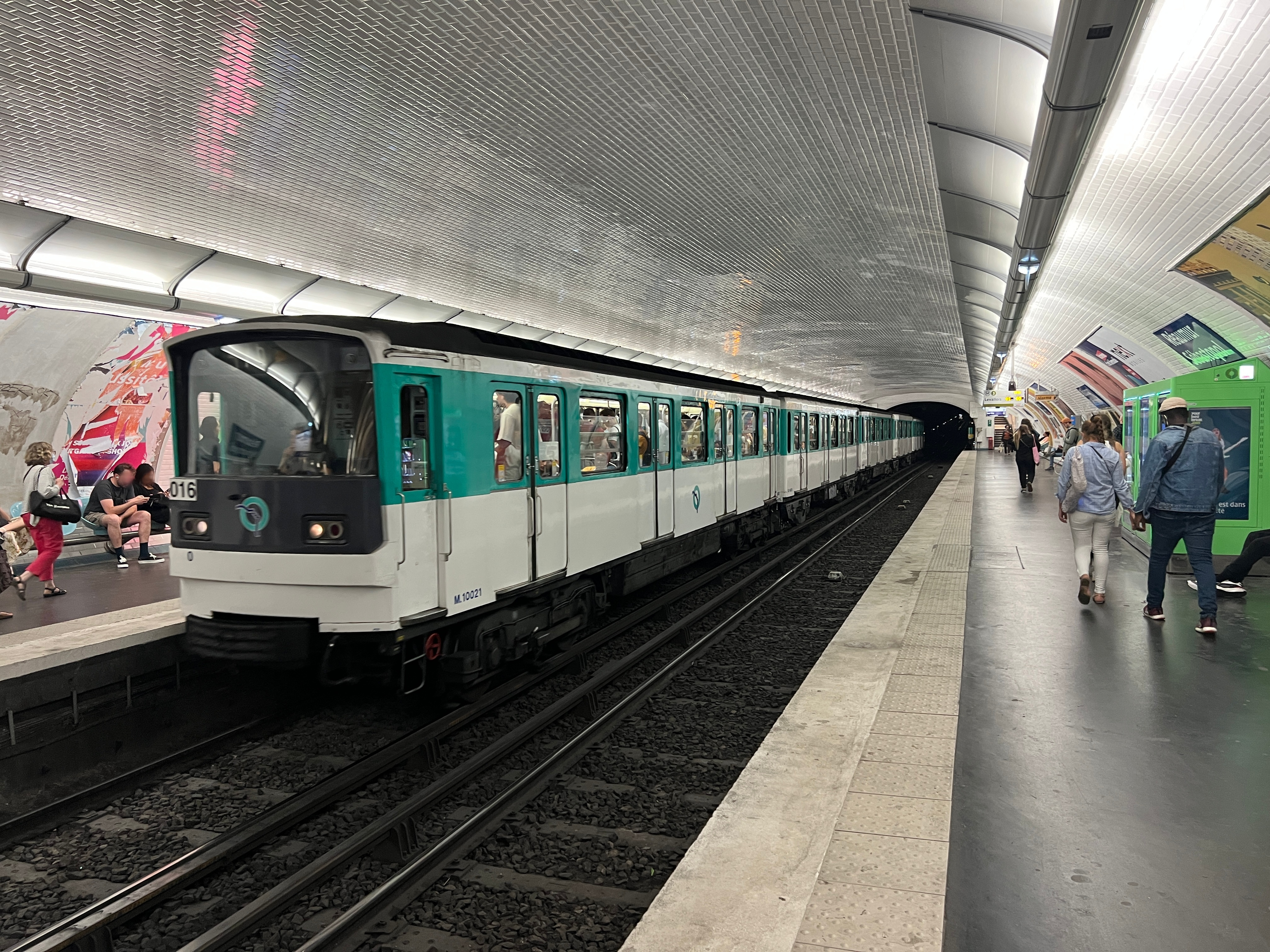
- Line 3 platforms

General information
- Location: Square Émile Chantemps; 68, Rue Réaumur; 81, Rue Réaumur; 182, Rue Saint-Denis; 2nd and 3rd arrondissement of Paris; Île-de-France; France
- Coordinates: 48°51′58″N 2°21′09″E
- Owner: RATP
- Operator: RATP

Other information
- Fare zone: 1

History
- Opened: 19 November 1904
- Former names: Rue Saint Denis (1904–1907)

Services
Preceding station	Paris Metro	Following station
Sentier towards Pont de Levallois–Bécon	Line 3	Arts et Métiers towards Gallieni
Étienne Marcel towards Bagneux–Lucie Aubrac	Line 4	Strasbourg–Saint-Denis towards Porte de Clignancourt
Location
- Location within Paris

Réaumur–Sébastopol (French pronunciation: [ʁeomyʁ sebastɔpɔl]) is a station on Line 3 and Line 4 of the Paris Métro. Located on the border between the 2nd arrondissement and 3rd arrondissement, it was used by 4,925,640 passengers in 2013, making it the 88th busiest station out of 302 on the Métro network.

== Location ==
The station is located at the intersection of Rue Réaumur and Boulevard de Sébastopol.

== History ==
The station opened on 19 October 1904 as Rue Saint-Denis (named after Rue Saint Denis), as part of the first section of the Line 3 between Père Lachaise and Villiers. It was renamed to the current name on 15 October 1907, after Rue Réaumur and the Boulevard de Sébastopol. Those are respectively named after the scientist René-Antoine Ferchault de Réaumur and for the port of Sevastopol in Crimea, the scene of the Siege of Sevastopol (1854–1855) during the Crimean War. The Line 4 platforms opened on 21 April 1908 as part of the first section of the line from Châtelet to Porte de Clignancourt.

The line 3 platforms are decorated with panels showing old newspapers front pages, some of which relate to the Second World War. They recall the historical concentration of newspapers headquarters in Rue Réaumur.

The station was renovated from 4 March 2013 to 30 June 2014 as part of the Renouveau du Métro (RNM) program. Its line 4 platforms were raised between 28 August to 26 November 2017 to install landing doors, in preparation for the automation of the line. Those doors were then installed from November to December 2019.

In 2019, 5,291,106 travellers entered this station which placed it at 75th position of the metro stations for its usage.

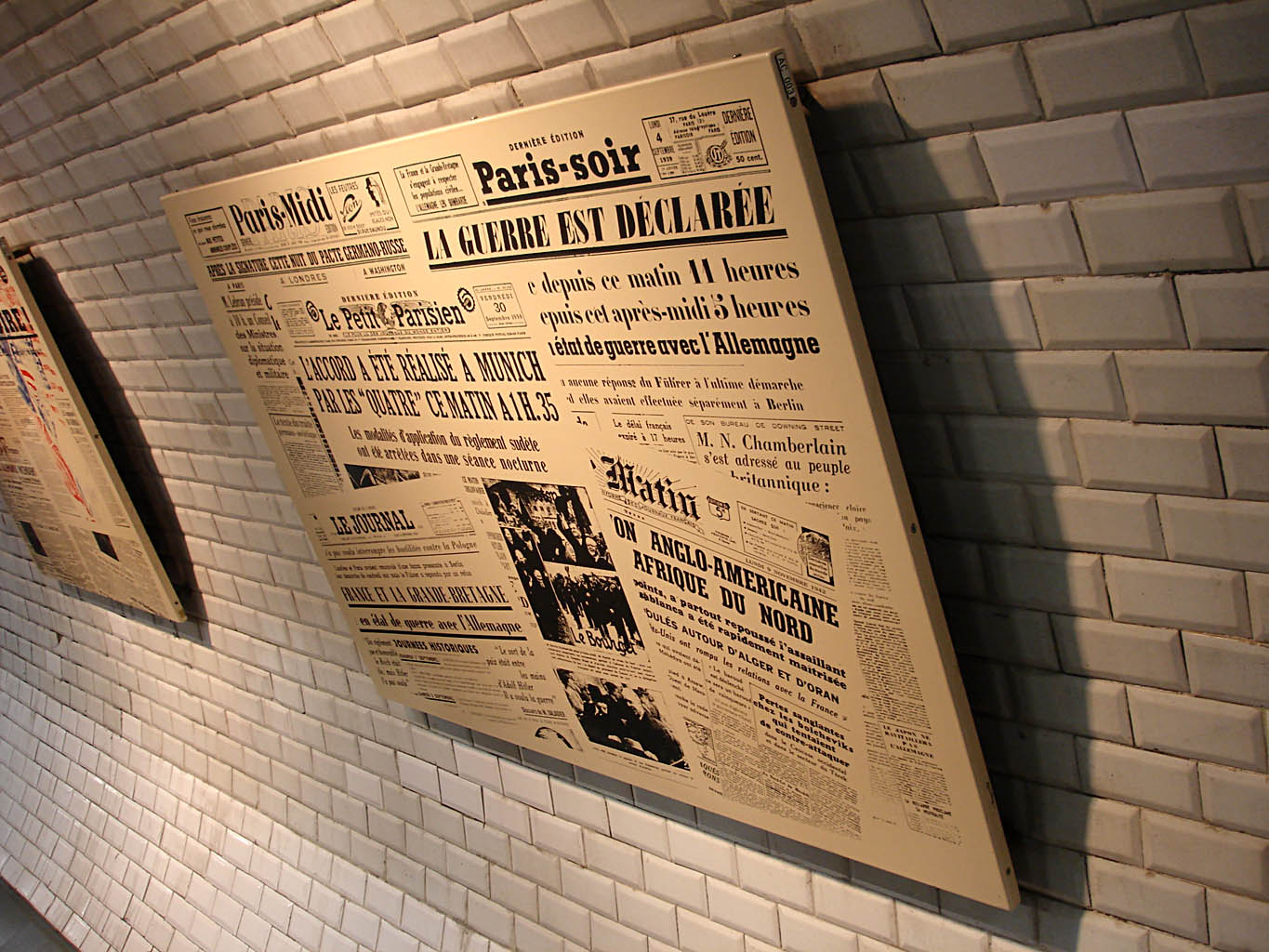
Platform artwork at Réaumur–Sébastopol (Line 3)

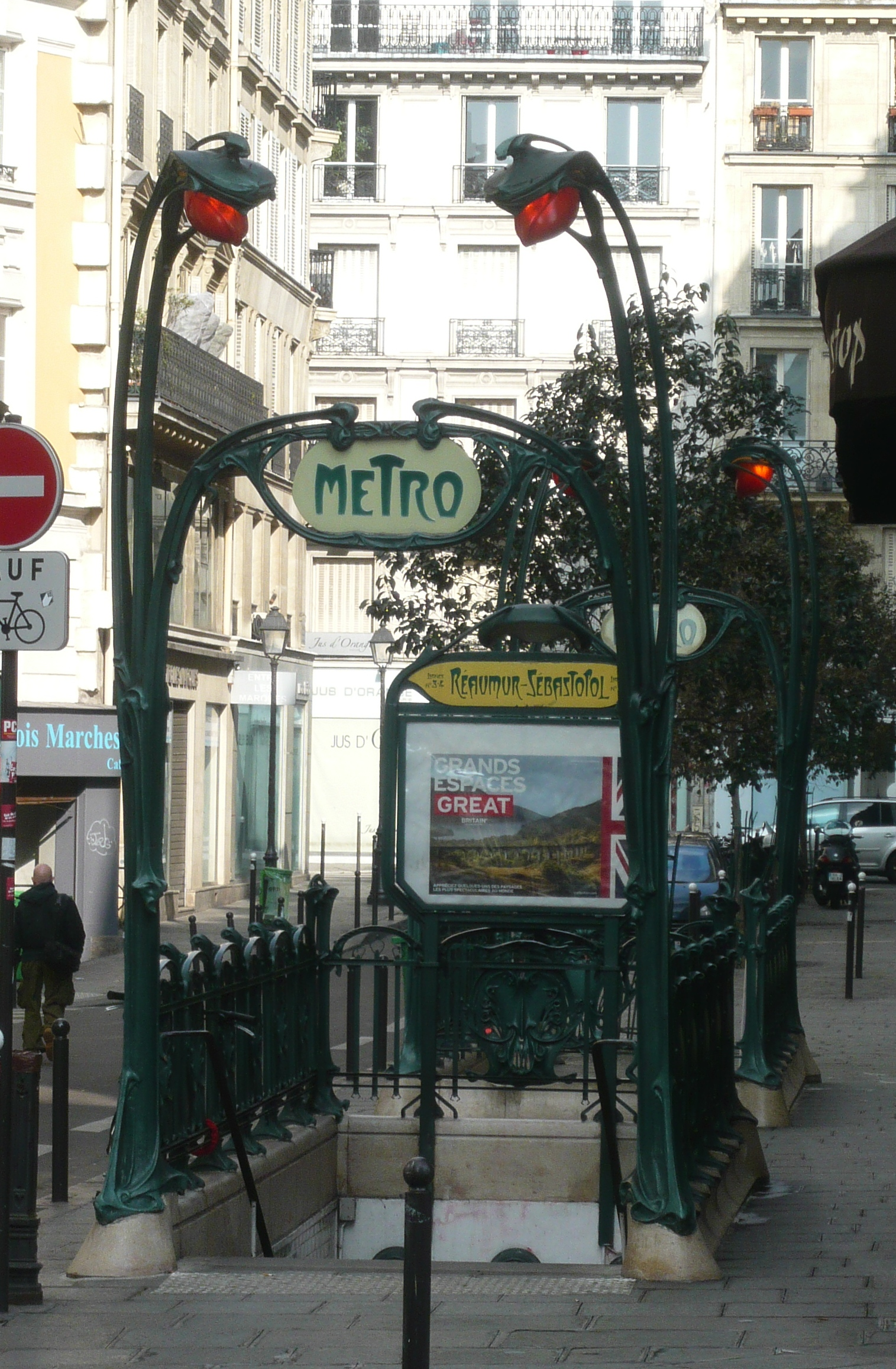
Station entrance

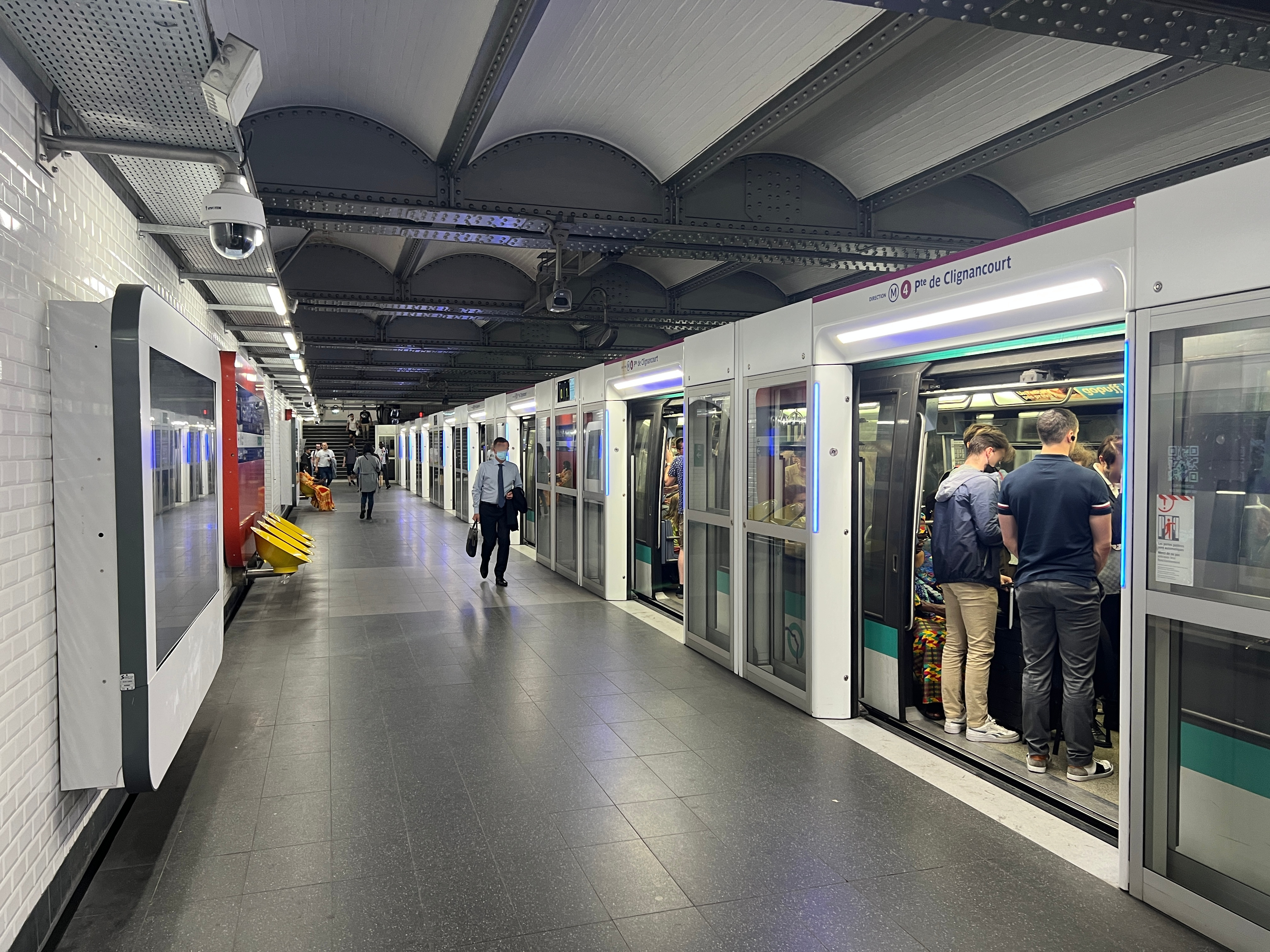
Line 4 platforms

== Passenger services ==
=== Access ===
- Square Émile-Chautemps
- 68 Rue Réaumur
- 81 Rue Réaumur
- Rue de Palestro

=== Station layout ===
Street Level

B1	Mezzanine for platform connection

Line 3 platforms	Side platform, doors will open on the right
Line 3 platforms	Westbound	← toward Pont de Levallois–Bécon (Sentier)
Line 3 platforms	Eastbound	toward Gallieni (Arts et Métiers) →
Line 3 platforms	Side platform, doors will open on the right

Line 4 platforms	Side platform with PSDs doors will open on the right
Line 4 platforms	Northbound	← toward Porte de Clignancourt (Strasbourg–Saint-Denis)
Line 4 platforms	Southbound	toward Bagneux–Lucie Aubrac (Étienne Marcel) →
Line 4 platforms	Side platform with PSDs doors will open on the right

=== Platforms ===
The platforms of the two lines are of standard configuration. They are separated by the metro tracks located in the centre. The platforms of line 3 have an elliptical vault. The decoration of the platforms is in the style used for most metro stations. The lighting canopies are white and rounded in the Gaudin during the du métro des années 2000 renovation, and the bevelled white ceramic tiles cover the vault, walls, and the tunnel exits. The advertising frames are of a white ceramic colour and the name of the station is in the Parisine font on enamelled plate. The seats are in the Akiko style, jade colour. The walls of platforms of line 4 are flush with the ground, the ceiling consists of a metal deck, whose beams are silver in colour, supported by vertical white ceramic tiled walls. Since 2017, they have been in the process of automating line 4.

=== Bus connections ===
The station is served by bus lines 20, 38 and 39 of the RATP Bus Network and, at night, by lines N12, N13, N14 and N23 of the Noctilien bus network.

== Nearby ==
- Musée des Arts et Métiers

== Culture ==
The station's name is parodied in episode 41 of the Bref series which has the Paris metro as its subject. RATP having refused permission to shoot in the metro a fiction which reflected negatively on its network, the episode was filmed in a minimalist studio set imitating a subway train. As a protest, the creators of the series changed the station from Réaumur–Sébastopol to Censure–Sébastopol.
