= Poissonnière station =

Metro station in Paris, France

Poissonnière
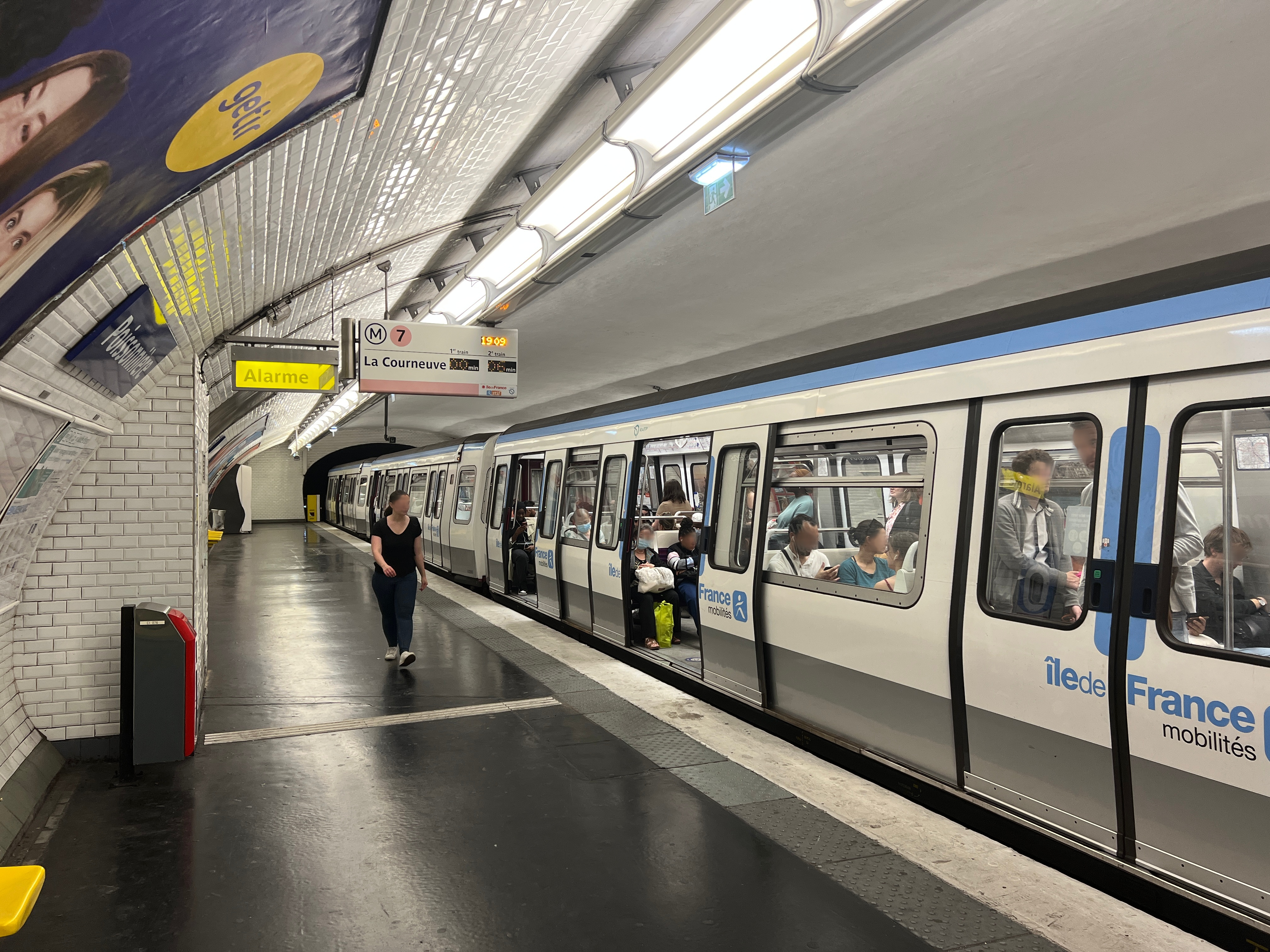
- MF 77 in the new IDFM livery at Poissonnière

General information
- Location: Rue La Fayette; 9th arrondissement of Paris; Île-de-France; France
- Coordinates: 48°52′37″N 2°20′54″E
- System: Paris Métro station
- Owner: RATP
- Operator: RATP
- Line: Paris Metro Paris Metro Line 7
- Platforms: 2 (2 side platforms)
- Tracks: 2

Other information
- Fare zone: 1

History
- Opened: 5 November 1910; 115 years ago

Passengers
- 1,686,977 (2020)

Services
Preceding station	Paris Metro	Following station
Cadet towards Villejuif–Louis Aragon or Mairie d'Ivry	Line 7	Gare de l'Est towards La Courneuve–8 mai 1945
Location
- Location within Paris

Poissonnière (French pronunciation: [pwasɔnjɛʁ]) is a station on Line 7 of the Paris Métro. It is located near the junction between rue La Fayette and rue du Faubourg Poissonnière, after which it is named and along which fishmongers (French: Poissonnières) brought fish from Boulogne-sur-Mer and other harbours on the Channel coast to the market at Les Halles in chasse-marées. The route from the coast generally followed that of a Roman Road and entered nineteenth century Paris at the Porte des Poissonniers.

== History ==
Poissonnière was opened on 5 November 1910 with the commissioning of the first section of line 7 between Opéra and Porte de la Villette. As part of the "Un métro + beau" programme by the RATP, the station was renovated and modernised on 9 December 2008.

On 9 October 2019, half of the nameplates on the station's platforms were temporarily replaced by the RATP to celebrate the 60th anniversary of the Asterix and Obelix comics, along with 11 other stations. Although its name was not changed, the new nameplates were stylised with typography reminiscent of the comic strips by René Goscinny and Albert Uderzo, the creators of the Asterix and Obelix comics. A character from the comics, Ordralfabétix, was also added to the nameplates.

In 2019, the station was used by 3,466,034 passengers, making it the 139th busiest of the Métro network out of 302 stations.

In 2020, the station was used by 1,686,977 passengers amidst the COVID-19 pandemic, making it the 149th busiest of the Métro network out of 305 stations.

== Passenger services ==
=== Access ===
The station has 3 entrances and features a 1960s-style yellow neon Métro sign.

- Entrance 1: rue La Fayette
- Entrance 2: rue de Chabrol
- Entrance 3: rue du Faubourg-Poissonnière

=== Station layout ===
Street Level
B1	Mezzanine
Line 7 platforms	Side platform, doors will open on the right
Line 7 platforms	Southbound	← toward Villejuif – Louis Aragon or Mairie d'Ivry (Riquet)
Line 7 platforms	Northbound	toward La Courneuve–8 mai 1945 (Corentin Cariou) →
Line 7 platforms	Side platform, doors will open on the right

=== Platforms ===
Poissonnière has a standard configuration with 2 tracks surrounded by 2 side platforms.

=== Other connections ===
The station is also served by lines 26, 32, 43, and 45 of the RATP bus network.

== Nearby ==
- Église Saint-Vincent-de-Paul
- Lycée Lamartine
- Square Aristide-Cavaillé-Coll
- Square Montholon

== Gallery ==
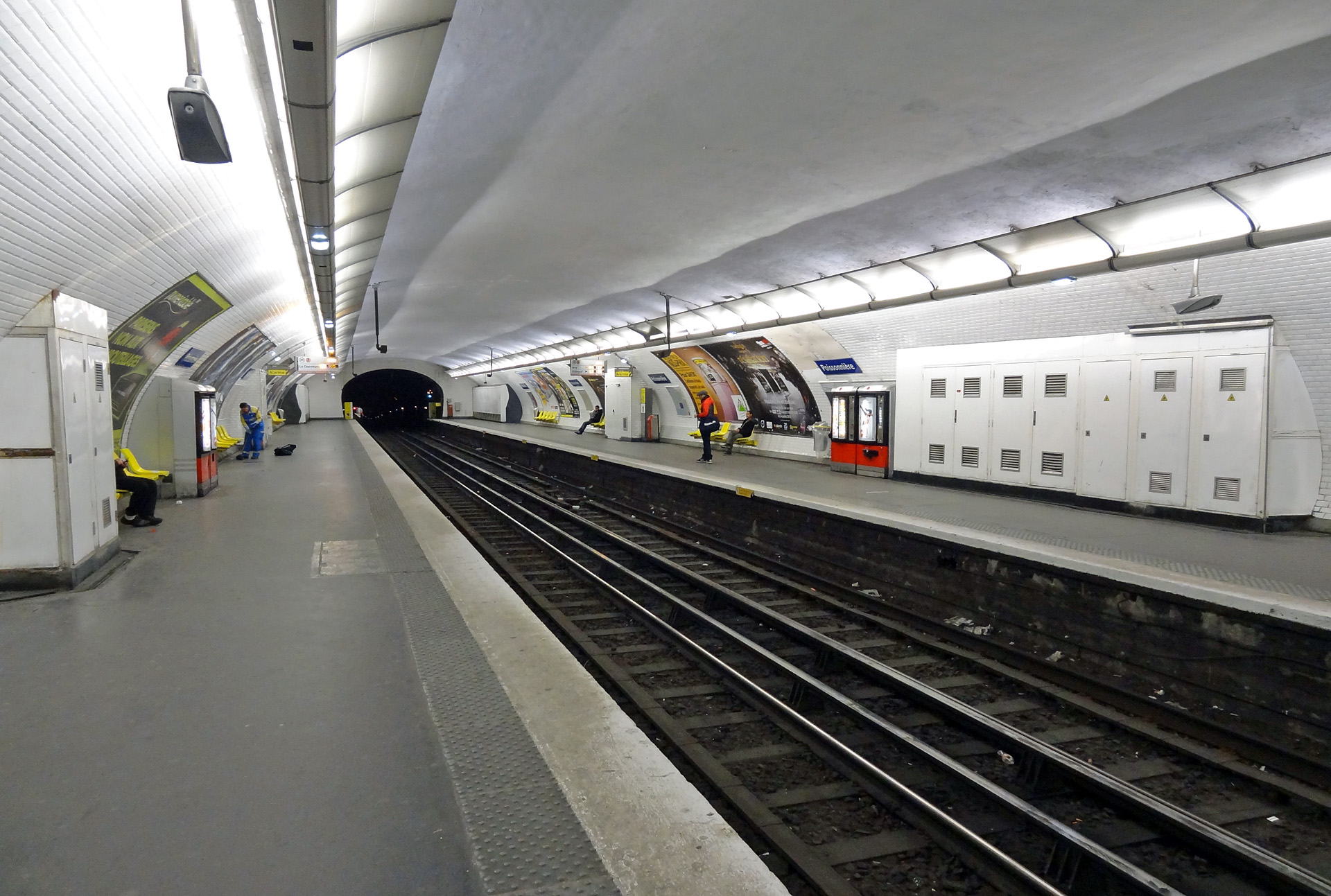
Platforms

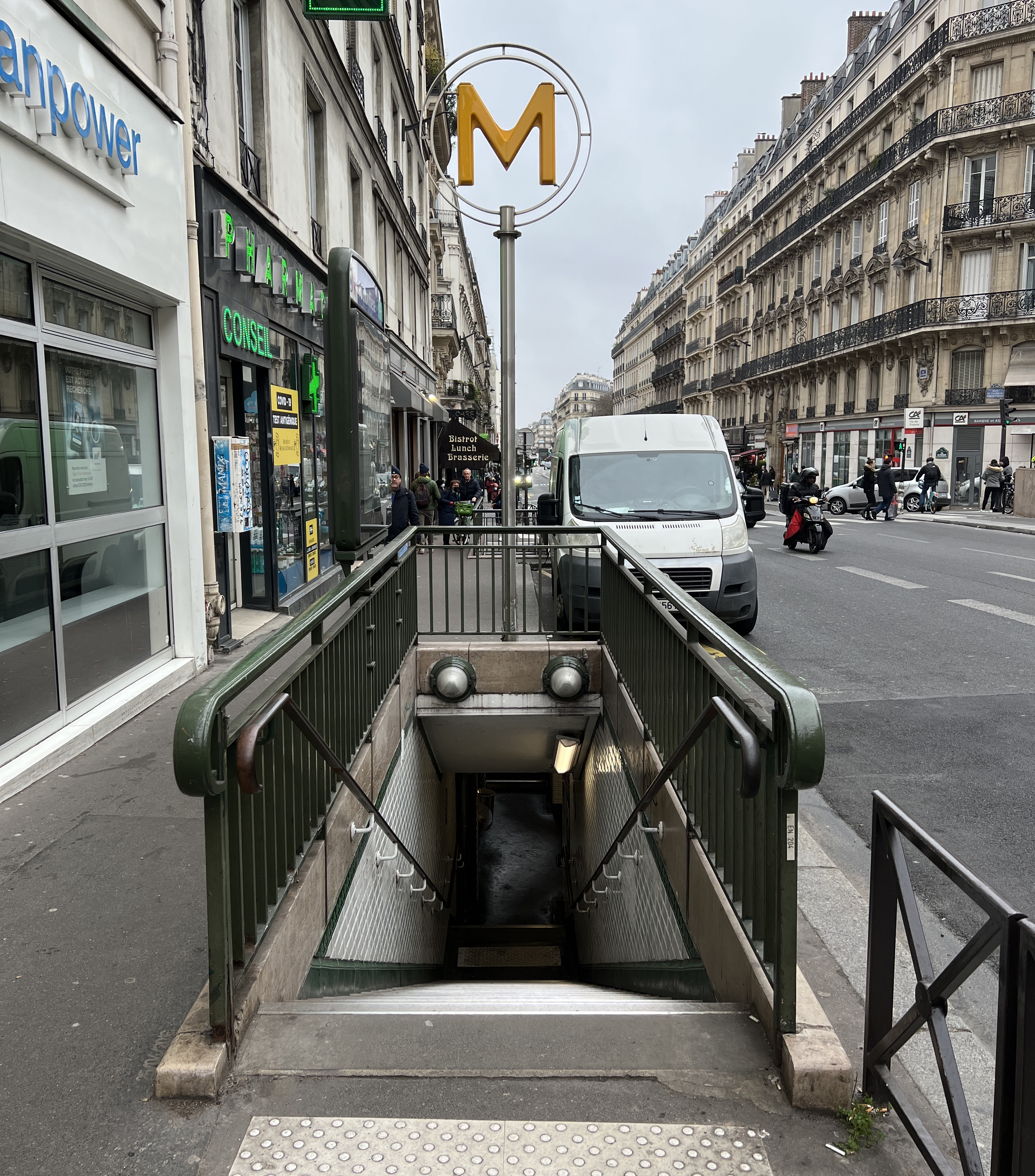
Entrance along rue La Fayette

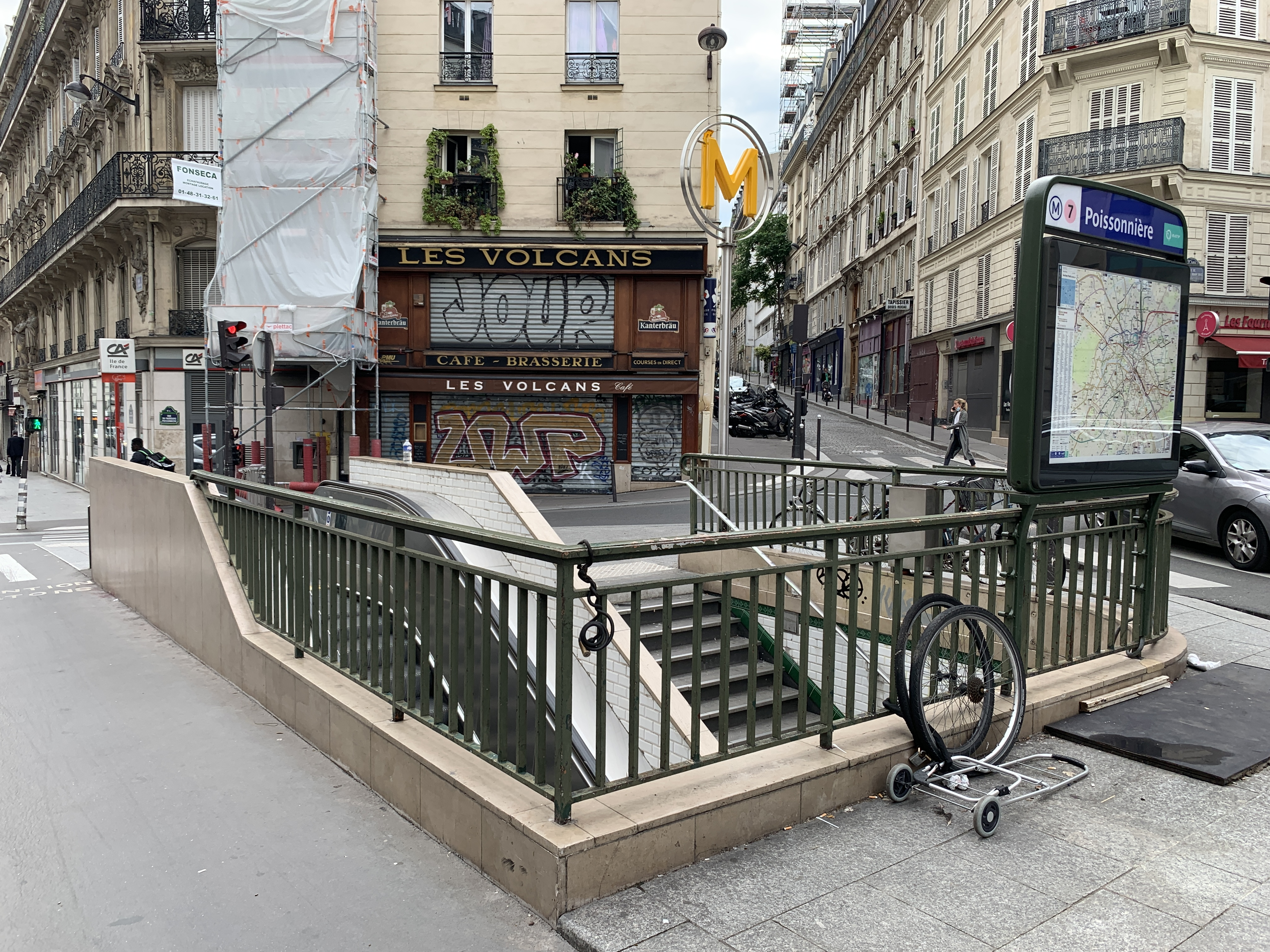
