= Strasbourg–Saint-Denis station =

Paris Métro station

Strasbourg–Saint-Denis
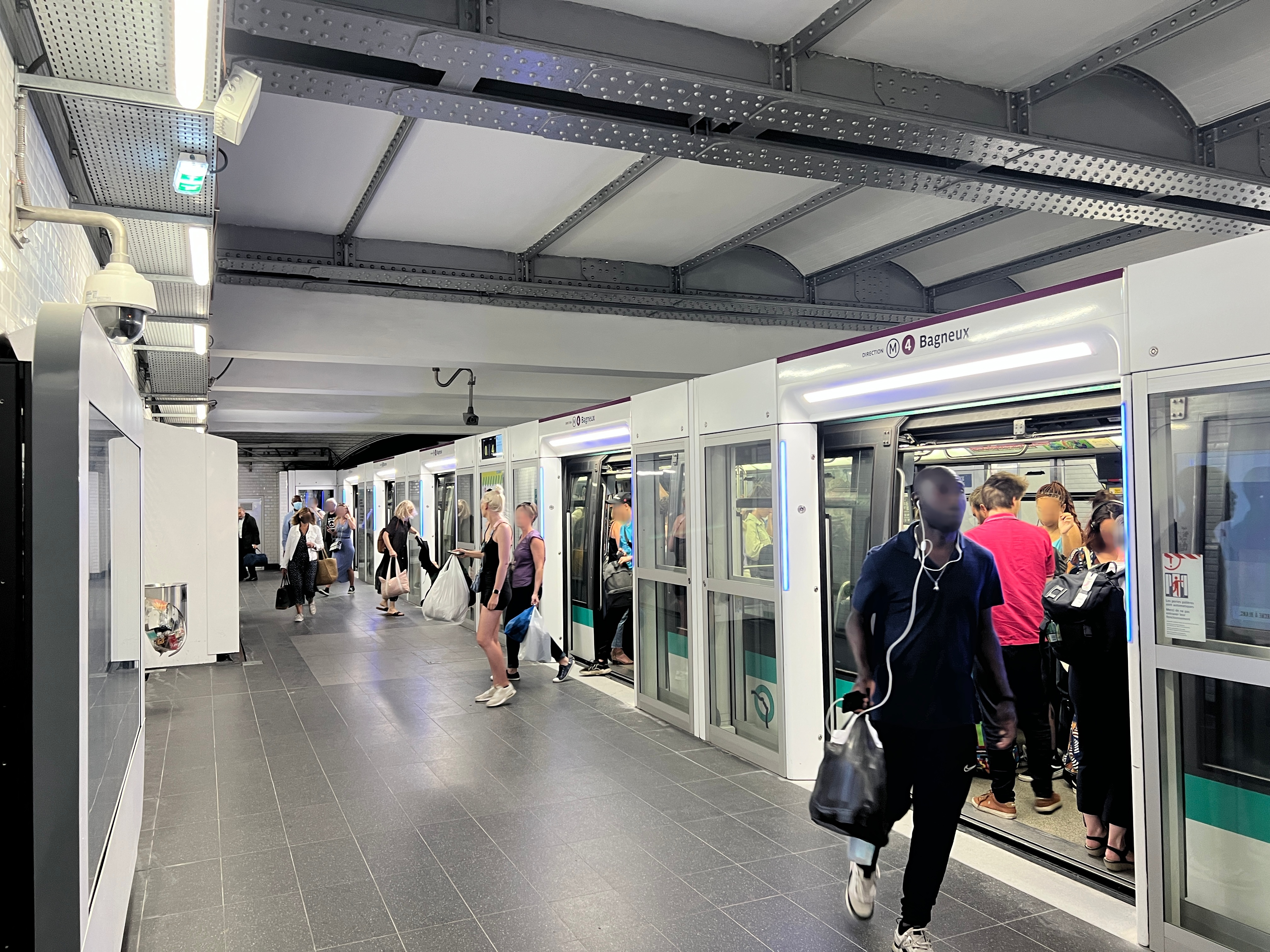
- Line 4 platforms

General information
- Location: 8, 9, 13, 18, 19, 28, Rue Saint-Denis; 10, Boul. Bonne Nouvelle; 2nd arrondissement of Paris; Île-de-France; France
- Coordinates: 48°52′11″N 2°21′14″E
- Owner: RATP
- Operator: RATP

Other information
- Fare zone: 1

History
- Opened: 21 April 1908
- Former names: Boulevard Saint-Denis (1908–1931)

Services
Preceding station	Paris Metro	Following station
Réaumur–Sébastopol towards Bagneux–Lucie Aubrac	Line 4	Château d'Eau towards Porte de Clignancourt
Bonne Nouvelle towards Balard	Line 8	Filles du Calvaire towards Pointe du Lac
Bonne Nouvelle towards Pont de Sèvres	Line 9	République towards Mairie de Montreuil
Location
- Location within Paris

Strasbourg–Saint-Denis (French pronunciation: [stʁasbuʁ sɛ̃ dəni]) is a station on Line 4, Line 8 and Line 9 of the Paris Métro. Opened in 1908 under the name Boulevard Saint-Denis, it took on its current name in 1931, which refers to Rue Saint-Denis and the Boulevard de Strasbourg.

== Location ==
The station of Line 4 is located under the Boulevard de Strasbourg while the stations of Lines 8 and 9 are located under the Boulevard de Bonne-Nouvelle. These last two lines cross Line 4 perpendicularly and from below, and which replaced the Louis XIII wall and is in soft ground, which was once the course of the Seine. Line 8 is on the higher level and Line 9 in the lower level. The platforms are at the sides and the box containing the lines and supporting the road above is strengthened by a central wall between the tracks.

== History ==
The station was opened on 5 May 1908, two weeks after the opening of the first section of Line 4 from Porte de Clignancourt to Châtelet on 21 April 1908. The Line 8 platforms opened on 5 May 1931 with the extension of the line from Richelieu–Drouot to Porte de Charenton. The Line 9 platforms were opened on 10 December 1933 with the extension of the line from Richelieu–Drouot to Porte de Montreuil.

On 13 August 1941, an anti-Nazi demonstration took place at the Strasbourg-Saint-Denis metro station. On 19 August 1941, Samuel Tyszelman and Henri Gautherot, two young communist activists who took part in the demonstration, were shot in the Forêt de Verrières. Maria Leonor Rubiano, who had made a tricolor flag with Angèle Martinez, was arrested a few weeks later by the Gestapo, imprisoned and then died in deportation.

The term Saint-Denis refers to Saint Denis, apostle of the Gauls and first bishop of Paris, who gave his name to the city of Saint-Denis and its abbey. Rue Saint-Denis in Paris, located in the immediate vicinity of the station, stretches from Rue de Rivoli in the south to the Porte Saint-Denis, built in memory of Louis XIV's triumphs in Holland and Germany. It was the link between Paris and Saint-Denis.

In 2019, 9,524,965 passengers entered the station, making it the 20th-most frequented metro station.

As of July 2026, Line 8 services to République are suspended due to renovations at République station. Line 8 trains will skip said station and continue to the following station. This suspension is expected to last until April 2027.

== Passenger services ==
=== Access ===
The station has seven entrances:

- Entrance 1: 8 Saint-Denis Boulevard;
- Entrance 2: 9 Saint-Denis Boulevard;
- Entrance 3: 13 Saint-Denis Boulevard;
- Entrance 4: 18 Saint-Denis Boulevard;
- Entrance 5: 19 Saint-Denis Boulevard;
- Entrance 6: 28 Saint-Denis Boulevard;
- Entrance 7: 10 Bonne-New Boulevard.

=== Station layout ===
G	Street Level	Exit/Entrance
B1	Mezzanine	Fare control
B2	Side platform with PSDs doors will open on the right
B2	Northbound	← toward Porte de Clignancourt (Réaumur–Sébastopol)
B2	Southbound	toward Bagneux–Lucie Aubrac (Château d'Eau) →
B2	Side platform with PSDs doors will open on the right
B3	Side platform doors will open on the right
B3	Westbound	← toward Balard (Bonne Nouvelle)
B3	Wall
B3	Eastbound	toward Pointe du Lac (Filles du Calvaire)
B3	Side platform, doors will open on the right
B4	Side platform, doors will open on the right
B4	Westbound	← toward Pont de Sèvres (Bonne Nouvelle)
B4	Wall
B4	Eastbound	toward Mairie de Montreuil (République) →
B4	Side platform, doors will open on the right

=== Platforms ===
The platforms of Line 4 are standard configuration. The two platforms are separated by the centre tracks. The ceiling is a metal apron whose beams are supported by vertical walls. The platforms are laid out in the Andreu-Motte style with two bright blue lighting canopies and blue Motte seats. Blue paint is also applied to the metal ceiling beams. The walls and tunnel exits are covered with flat white tiles laid vertically and aligned. The advertising frames are metallic and the name of the station is in Parisine font on enamelled plate.

As part of the automation of Line 4, its platforms have been upgraded to platform screen doors, which were installed between February and March 2020. The platforms of the lines 8 and 9, are 105 metres long, are of particular configuration, they are isolated as two half-stations each, separated by a central wall because of their construction within unstable terrain.

=== Bus connections ===
The station is served by the 20, 32, 38 and 39 lines of the RATP Bus Network and, at night, by the N13 and N14 lines of the Noctilien bus network.

== Nearby attractions ==
- Porte Saint-Denis
- Porte Saint-Martin
- Théâtre de la Porte Saint-Martin

== In popular culture ==
Roy Hargrove wrote a jazz composition titled "Strasbourg/Saint-Denis", released on the 2008 album Earfood, in reference to nearby New Morning jazz club where he often performed. In 2016, French pop band La Femme wrote a song entitled "S.S.D" about Strasbourg–Saint-Denis.

== Gallery ==
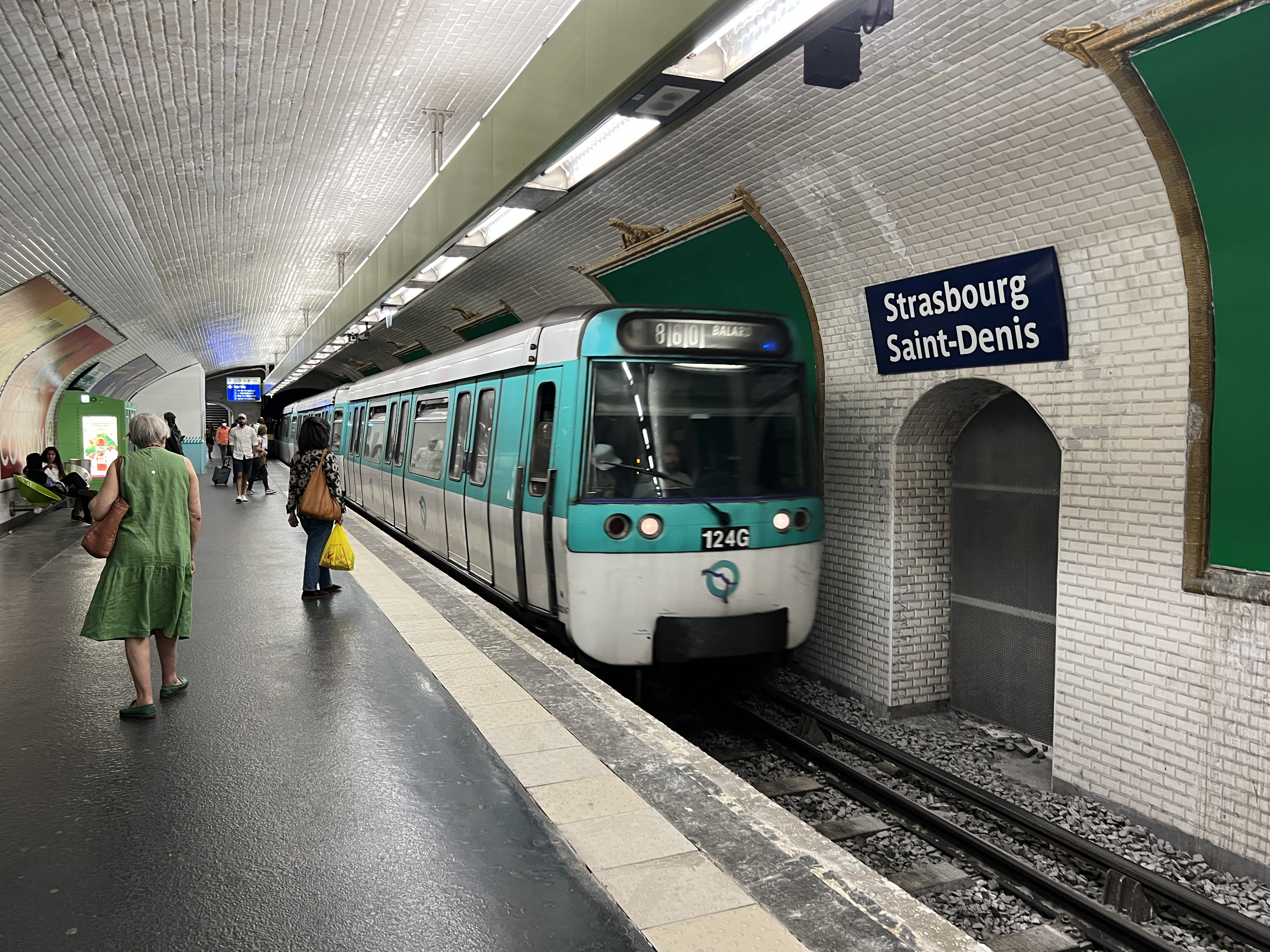
Line 8 platforms at Strasbourg–Saint-Denis

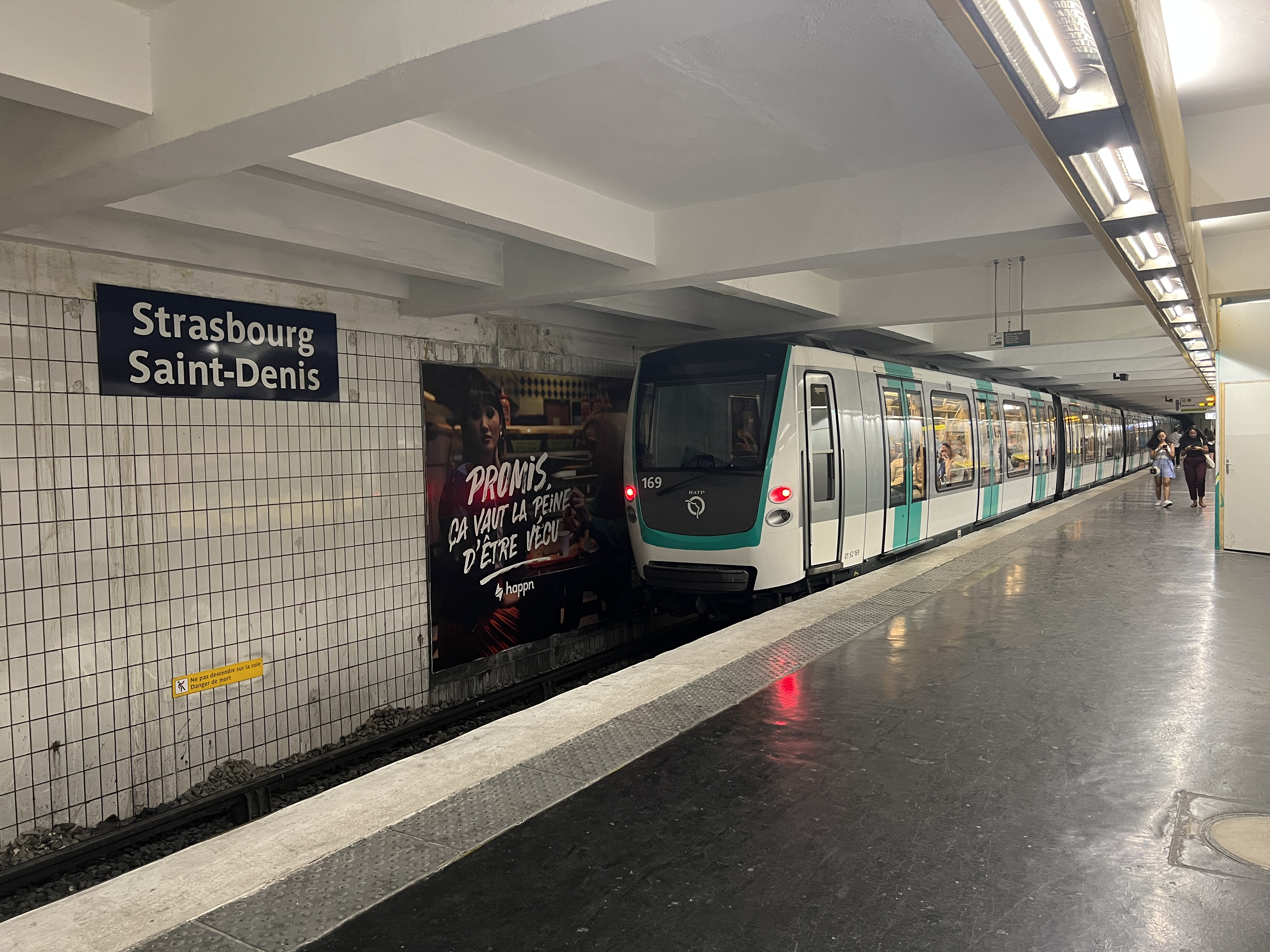
Line 9 platforms at Strasbourg–Saint-Denis
