= Gare de l'Est (Paris Metro) =

Metro station in Paris, France

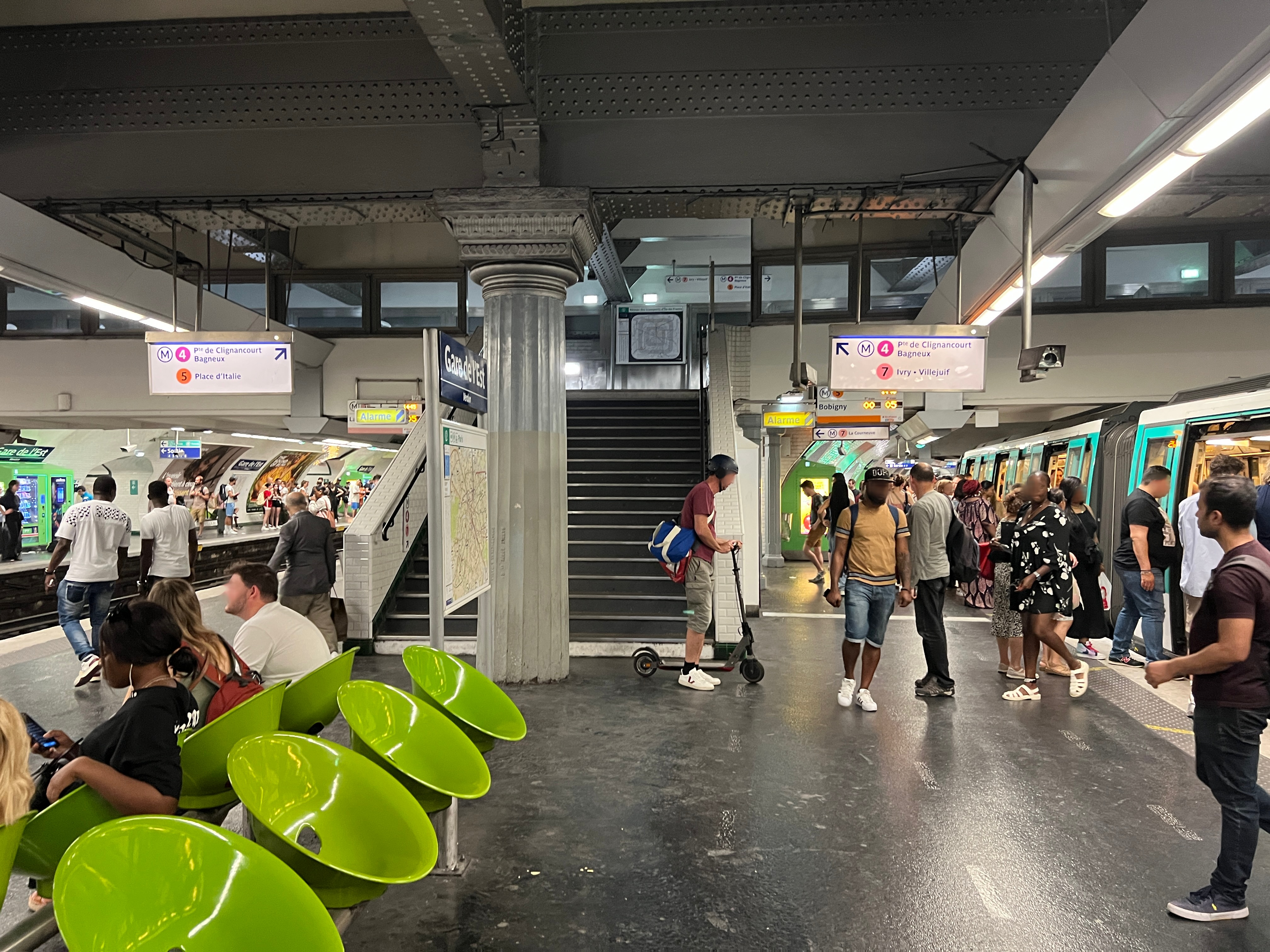

General information
- Other names: Verdun
- Location: 78, boul. de Strasbourg; 93, boul. de Strasbourg; Rue du Faubourg Saint-Martin × rue du 8 Mai 1945; 5, rue du 8 Mai 1945; Gare de l'Est; 10th arrondissement of Paris; Île-de-France; France
- Coordinates: 48°52′34″N 2°21′30″E
- Owner: RATP
- Operator: RATP

Other information
- Fare zone: 1

History
- Opened: 15 November 1907; 118 years ago

Passengers
- 2021: 15,538,471

Services
Preceding station	Paris Metro	Following station
Château d'Eau towards Bagneux–Lucie Aubrac	Line 4	Gare du Nord towards Porte de Clignancourt
Jacques Bonsergent towards Place d'Italie	Line 5	Gare du Nord towards Bobigny–Pablo Picasso
Poissonnière towards Villejuif–Louis Aragon or Mairie d'Ivry	Line 7	Château-Landon towards La Courneuve–8 mai 1945
Location
- Location within Paris

Gare de l'Est – Verdun (French pronunciation: [ɡaʁ də lɛst vɛʁdœ̃]) is a station of the Paris Métro, serving Lines 4, 5, and 7 is located in the 10th arrondissement in Paris, France. It is the fifth busiest station on the network.

== Location ==
The metro station consisting of three lines is located in front of the Gare de l'Est at the intersection of Rue du 8-Mai-1945 and Boulevard de Strasbourg, Line 4 follows a north/south axis and Lines 5 and 7 follow an east / west axis.

== History ==
The station was opened on 15 November 1907 as part of the extension of line 5 from Lancry (now Jacques Bonsergent) to Gare du Nord. The line 4 platforms were opened on 21 April 1908 as part of the first section of the line from Châtelet to Porte de Clignancourt. The line 7 platforms were opened on 5 November 1910 as part of the first section of the line from Opéra to Porte de la Villette. Lines 5 and 7 are parallel, running as four tracks with an island platform with two side platforms. Line 4 runs under 5 and 7 perpendicularly.

The station bears the name of Gare de l'Est, the station under which it is built. Its full name is Gare de l'Est-Verdun, named after the Avenue de Verdun nearby. The name Verdun is in memory of World War I's Battle of Verdun to which French soldiers were sent from the railway station.

From September 2006 to June 2007, Gare de l'Est and its metro station underwent a major renovation thanks to the Gares en mouvement and Un métro + beau projects, to accommodate a more beautiful and modern station the LGV Est line. On the platforms of Lines 5 and 7, orange tiles and blue paint gave way to traditional white tiles. The lights were also replaced, and the latest model of smiley style seating had been installed. Finally, the Parisine typeface replaced the Motte typeface, symbolizing the end of work on the platform. The new standard signage was installed throughout the station.

Only slight changes occurred on the platforms of Line 4. Apart from the replacement of the orange Motte tiles at the ends of the platforms and the passage of a layer of paint on the damaged tile of the vault.

In 2018, it was the fifth busiest metro station in the network, with 21,432,041 passengers passing through the train station.

== Passenger services ==
=== Access ===
The station has eight entrances:

- Access 1: Rue d'Alsace
- Access 2: SNCF Gare de l'Est
- Access 3: Place du 11-Novembre-1918
- Access 4: Rue du Faubourg-Saint-Martin
- Access 5: Rue du 8-Mai-1945
- Access 6: Boulevard de Strasbourg
- Access 7: Landing
- Access 8: Boulevard Magenta

=== Station layout ===
Street	Gare de l'Est
B1	Mezzanine
Lines 5/7 platforms	Side platform, doors will open on the right
Lines 5/7 platforms	Southbound	← toward Villejuif – Louis Aragon or Mairie d'Ivry (Poissonnière)
Lines 5/7 platforms	Northbound	toward La Courneuve–8 mai 1945 (Château-Landon) →
Lines 5/7 platforms	Island platform, doors will open on the right
Lines 5/7 platforms	Southbound	← toward Place d'Italie (Jacques Bonsergent)
Lines 5/7 platforms	Northbound	toward Bobigny – Pablo Picasso (Gare du Nord) →
Lines 5/7 platforms	Side platform, doors will open on the right
Line 4 platforms	Side platform, with PSDs doors will open on the right
Line 4 platforms	Northbound	← toward Porte de Clignancourt (Gare du Nord)
Line 4 platforms	Southbound	toward Bagneux–Lucie Aubrac (Château d'Eau) →
Line 4 platforms	Side platform with PSDs doors will open on the right

=== Bus and RER connections ===
The station is served by Lines 31, 32, 35, 38, 39, 46, 56, 91 and the OpenTour tourist line of the RATP Bus Network and, at night, by Lines N01, N02, N13, N14, N41, N42, N43, N44, N45, N140, N141, N142, N143, N144 and N145 of the Noctilien network.

As the name suggests, the metro station is connected to the train station Gare de Paris-Est. The maps for metro Line 7 indicate a connection with the RER E at the Gare de Magenta, although it is necessary to use the public road to reach it. This connection does not appear on the plans of Lines 4 and 5, a direct connection with the RER E can be made at the nearby Gare du Nord.

== Gallery ==
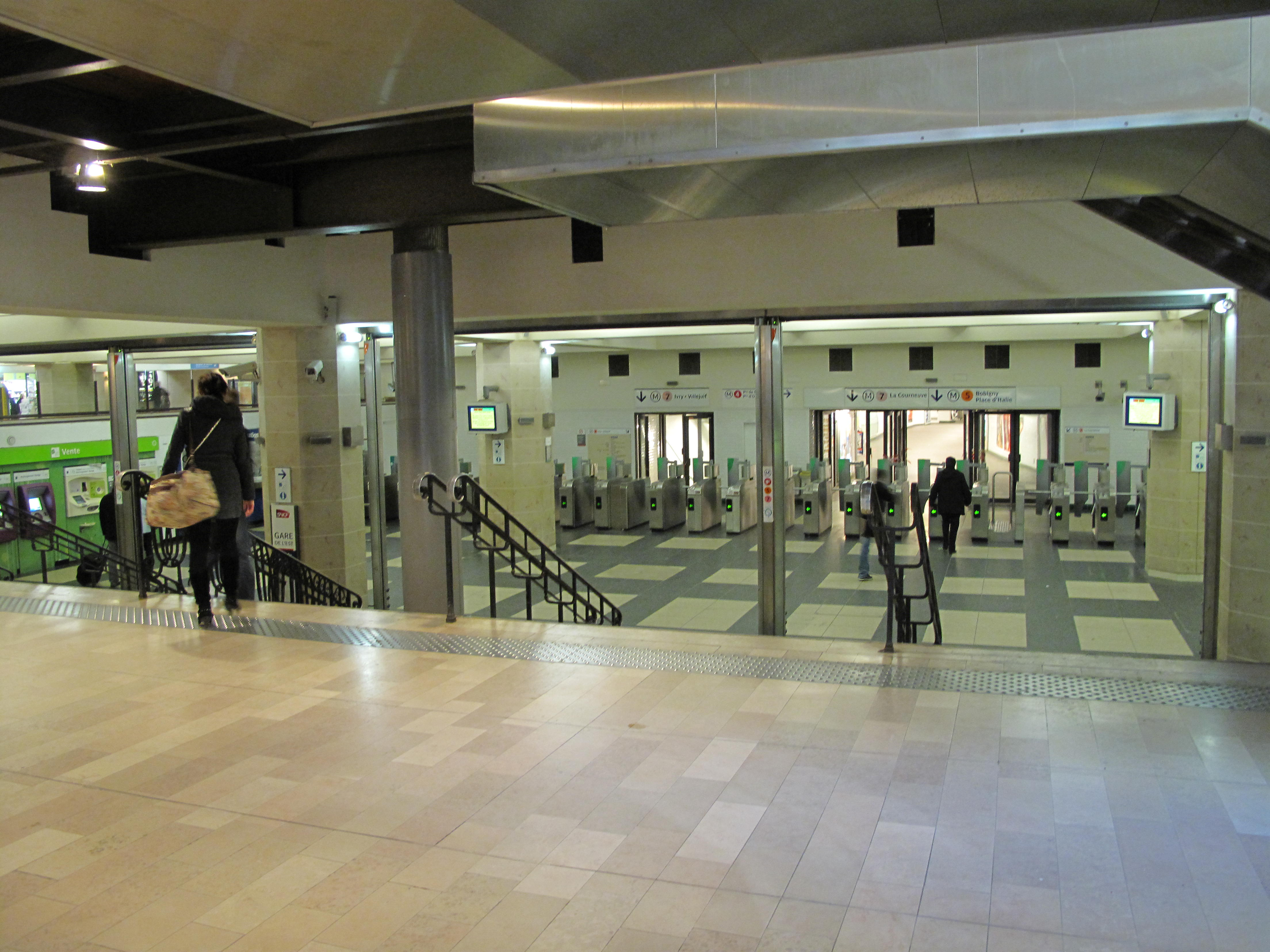
Gare de l'Est (Métro) ticket hall

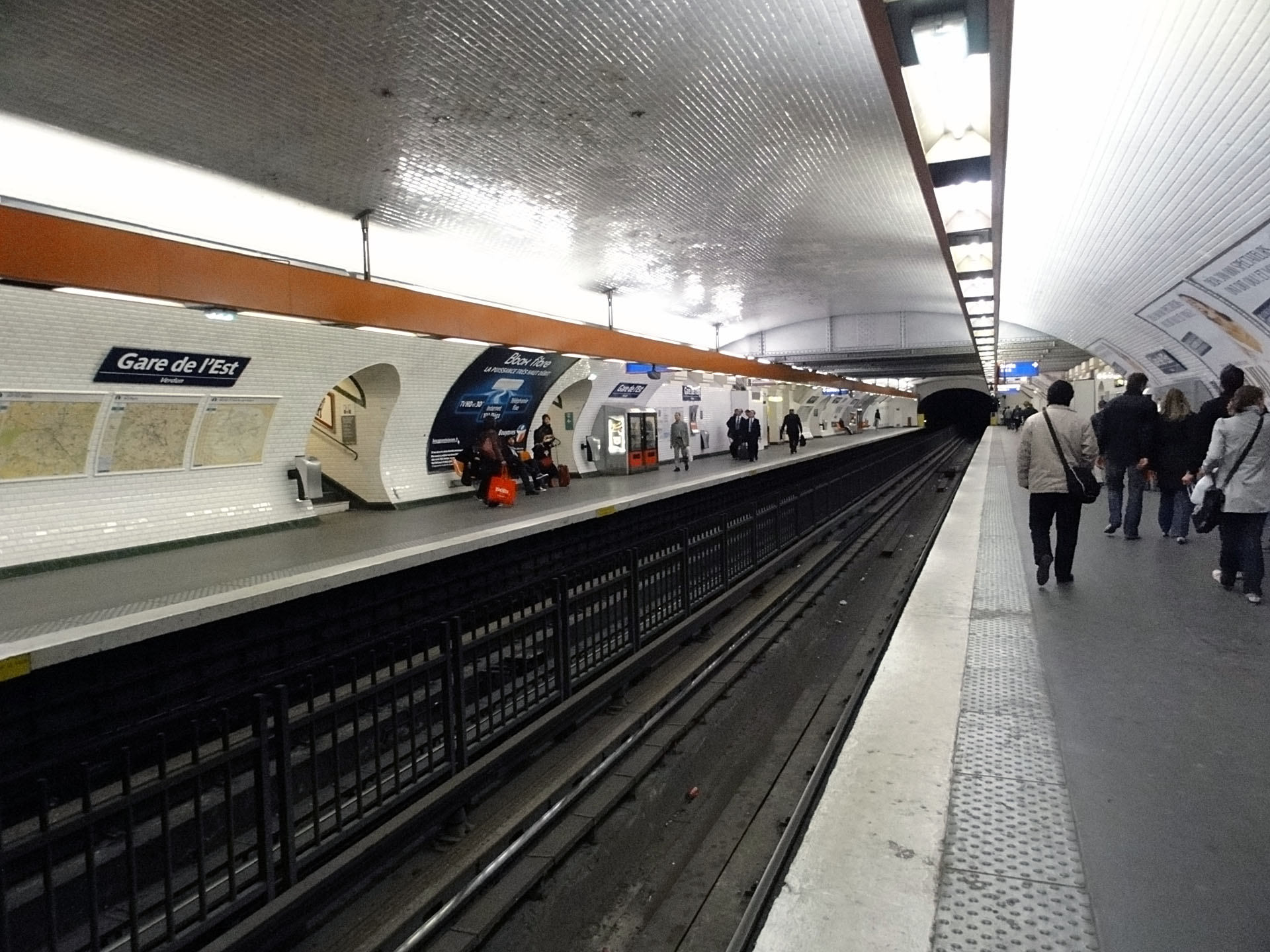
Line 4 platforms at Gare de l'est

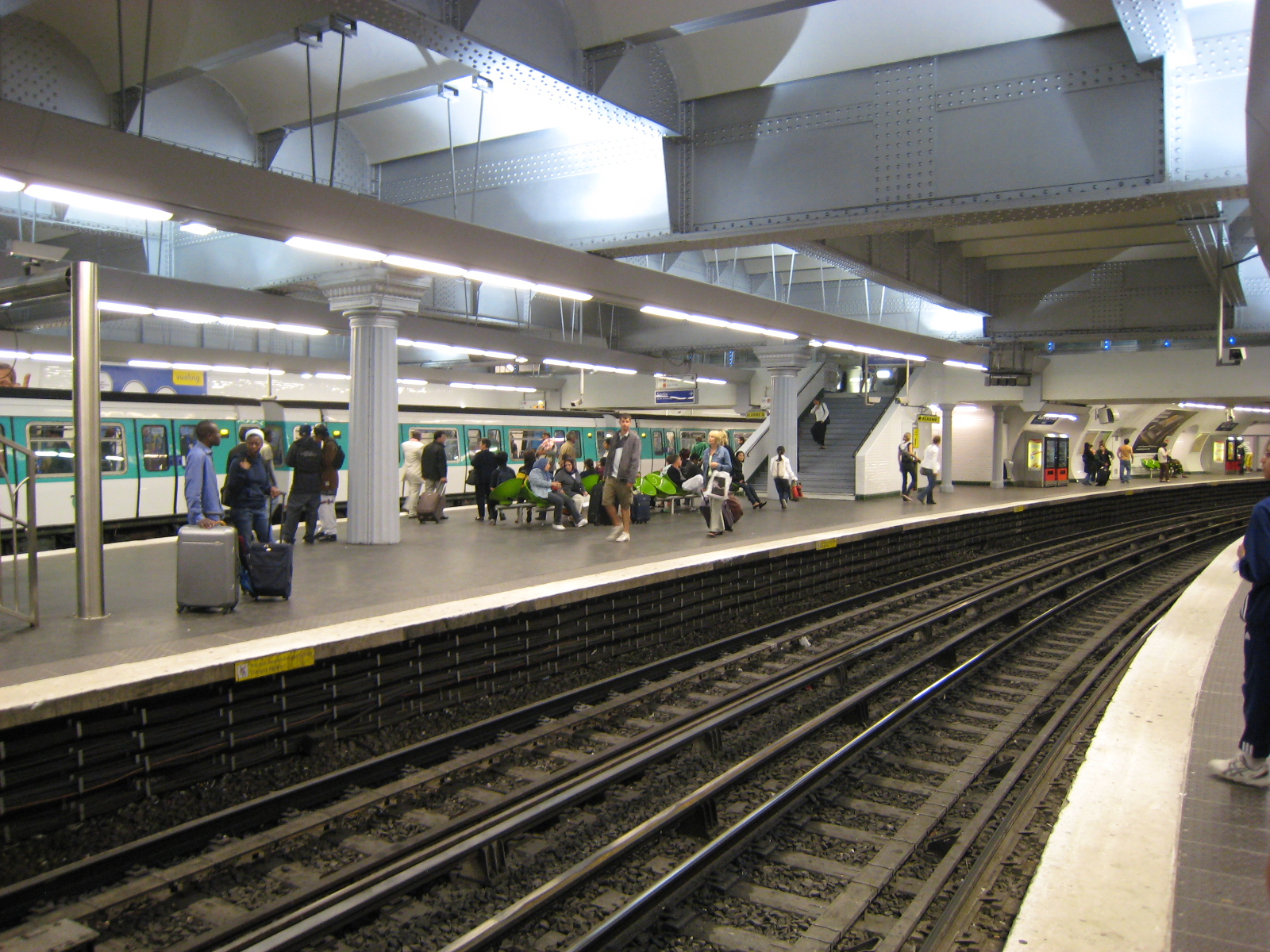
Line 5 (right) and Line 7 (left) tracks

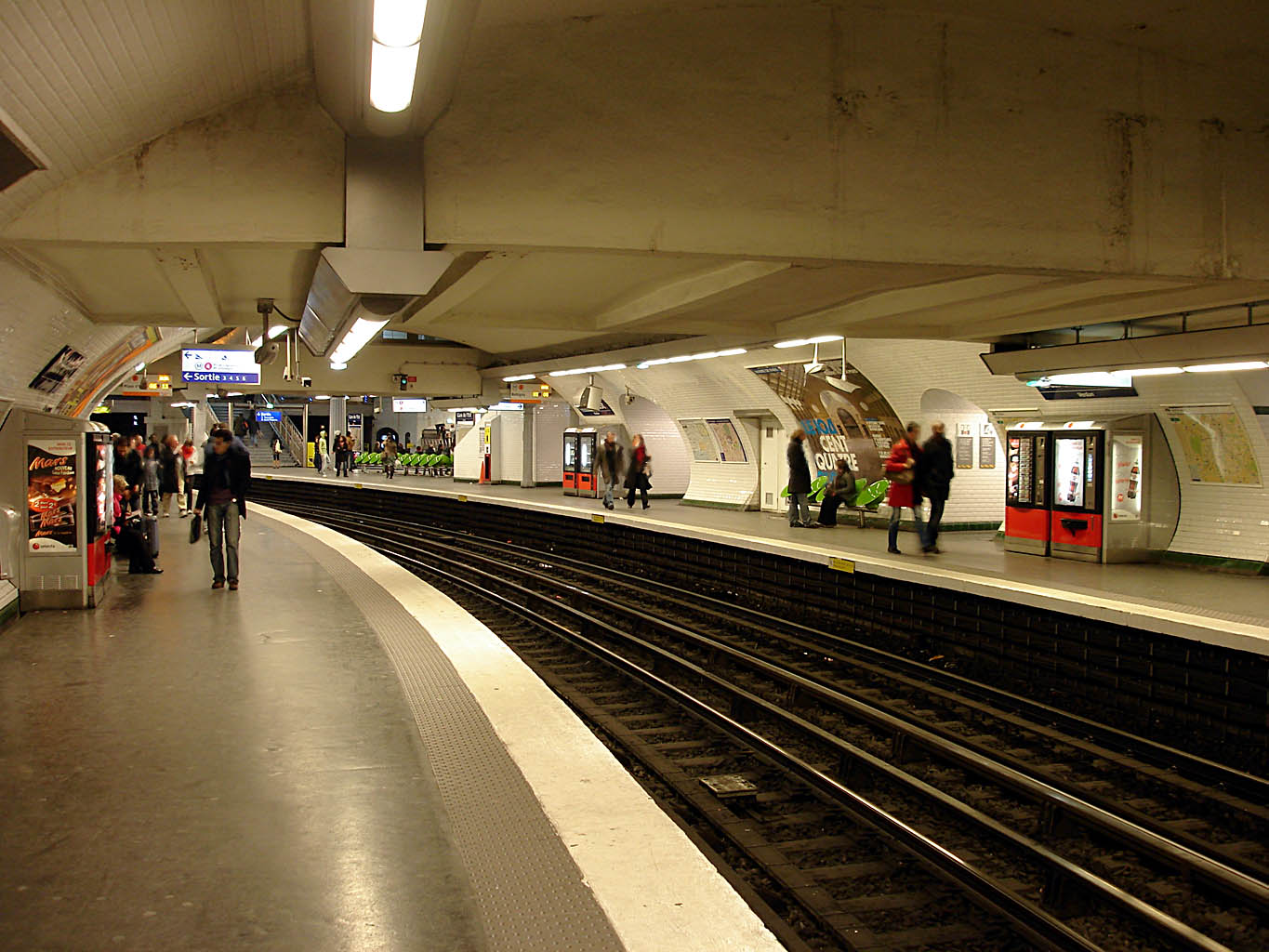
Line 5 platforms at Gare de l'Est

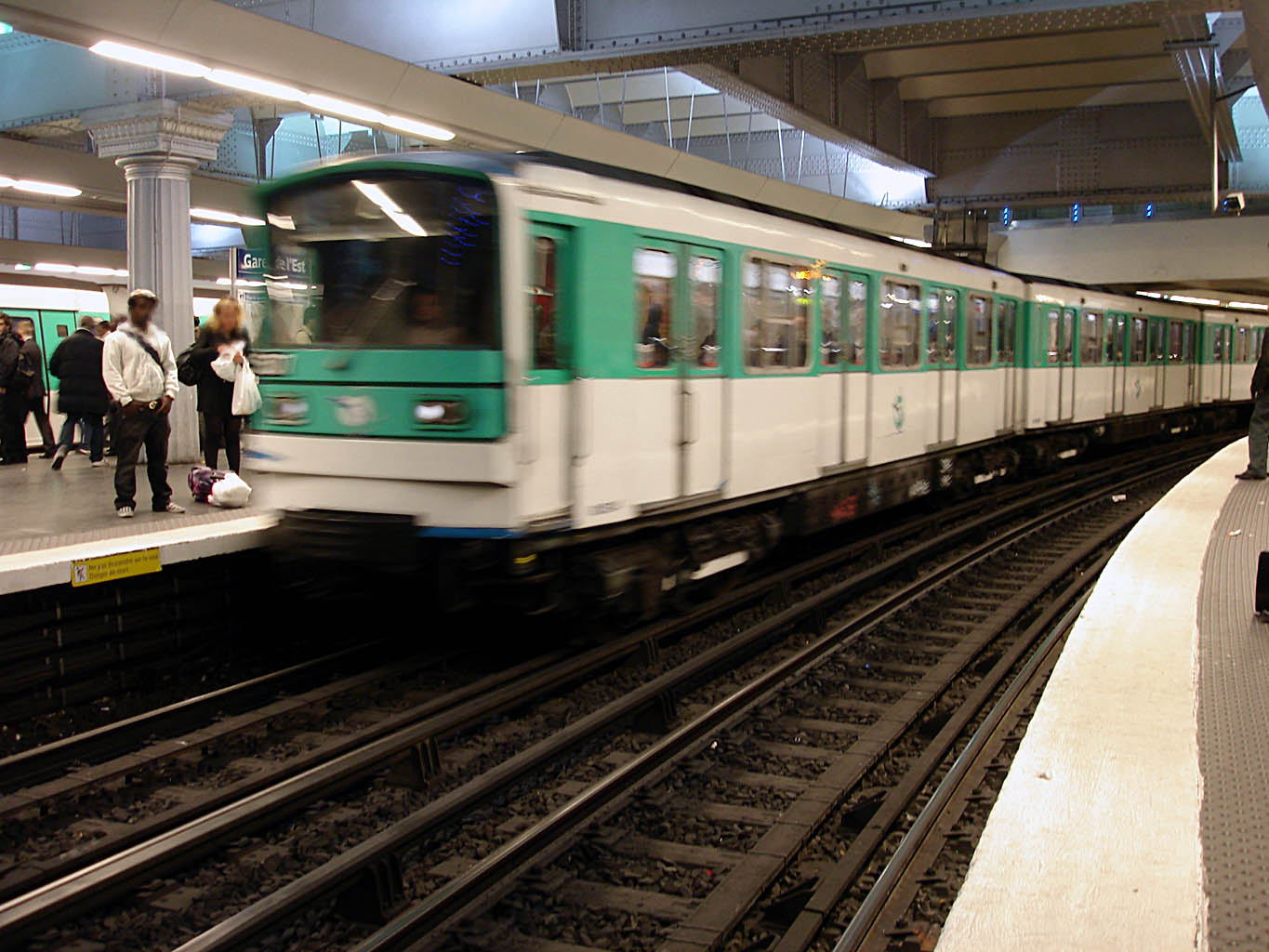
MF 67 rolling stock on Line 5 at Gare de l'Est

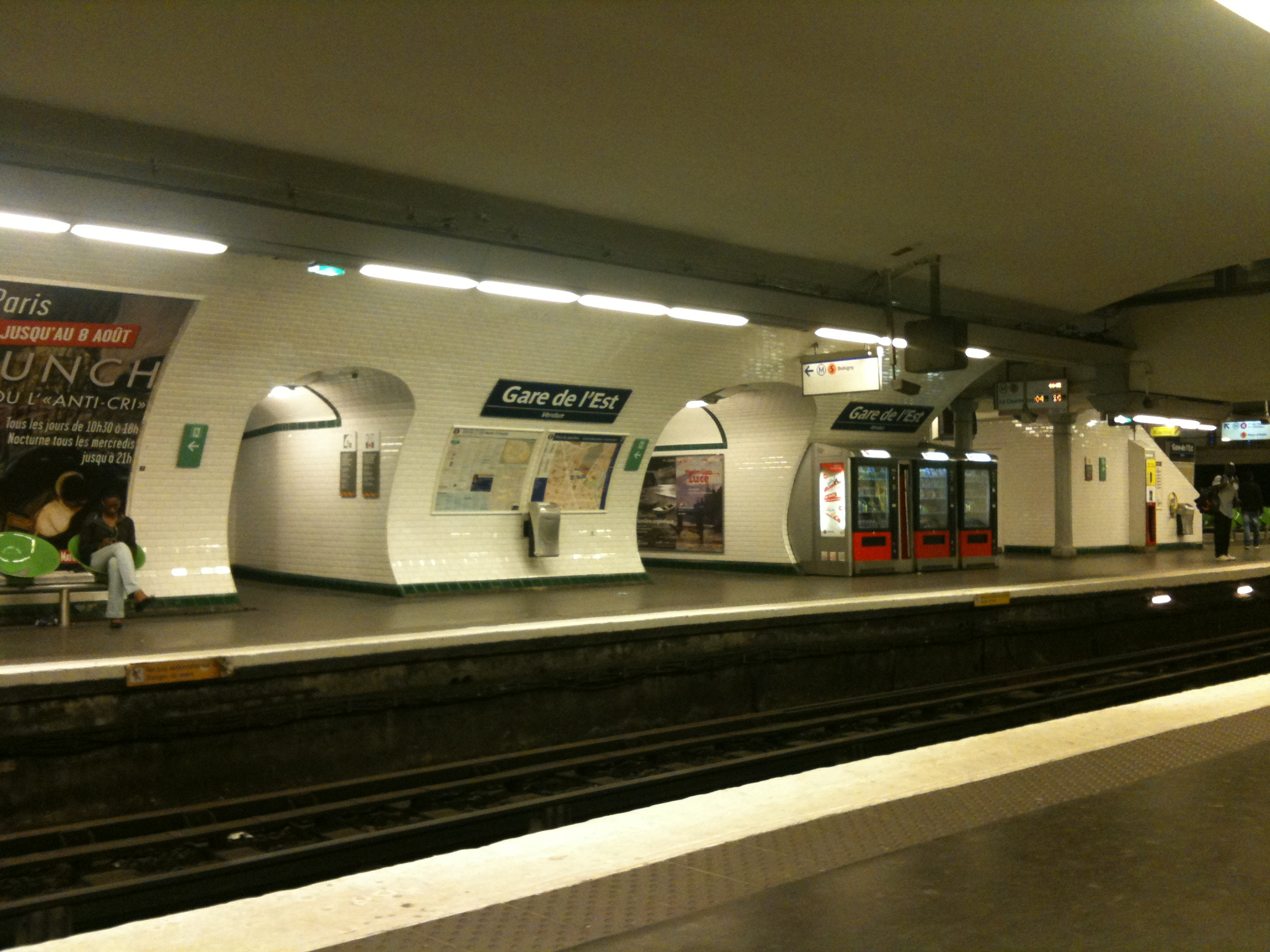
Line 7 platforms at Gare de l'Est

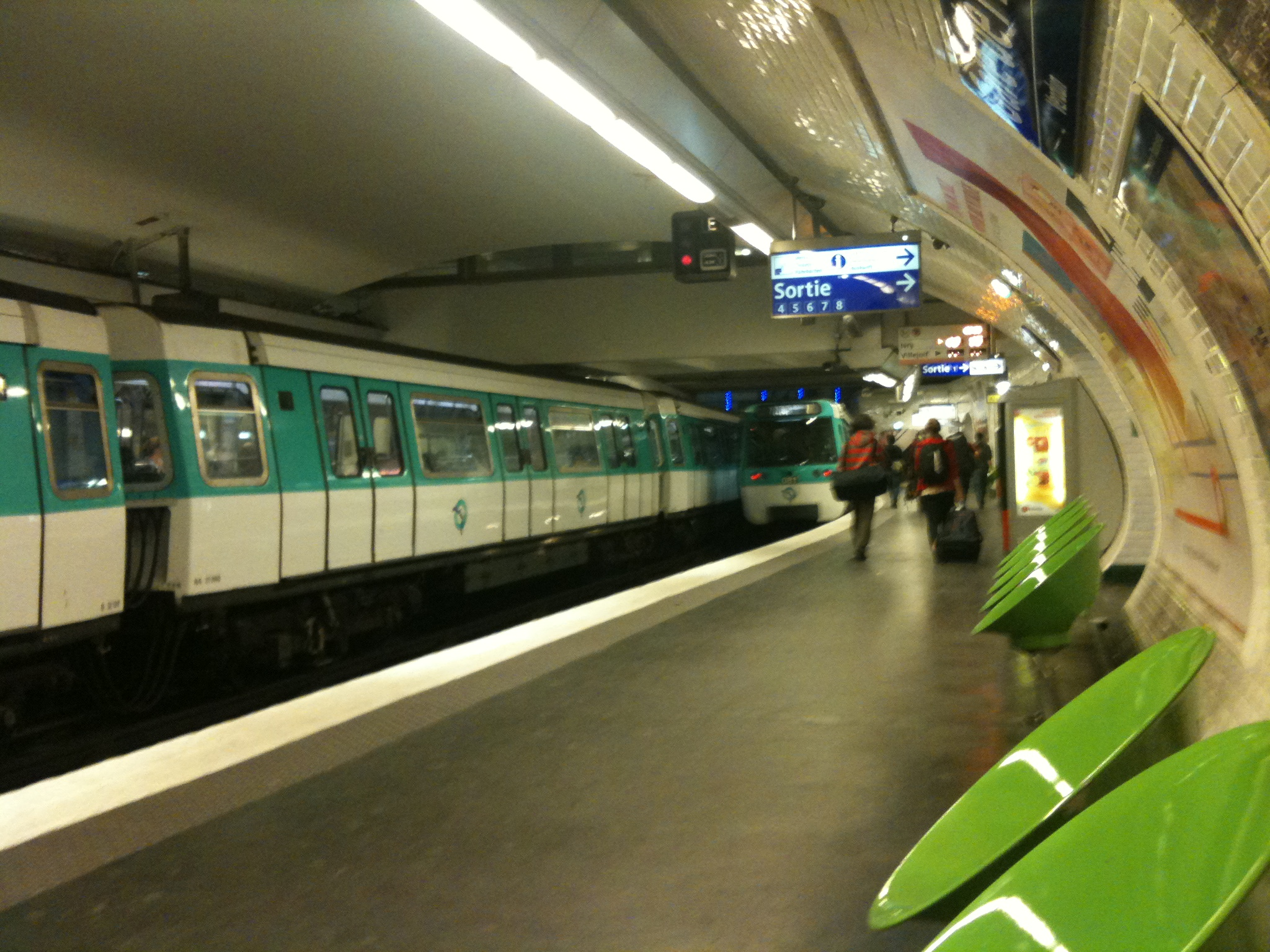
MF 77 rolling stock on Line 7 at Gare de l'Est
