= Château d'Eau station =

Metro station in Paris, France

Château d'Eau
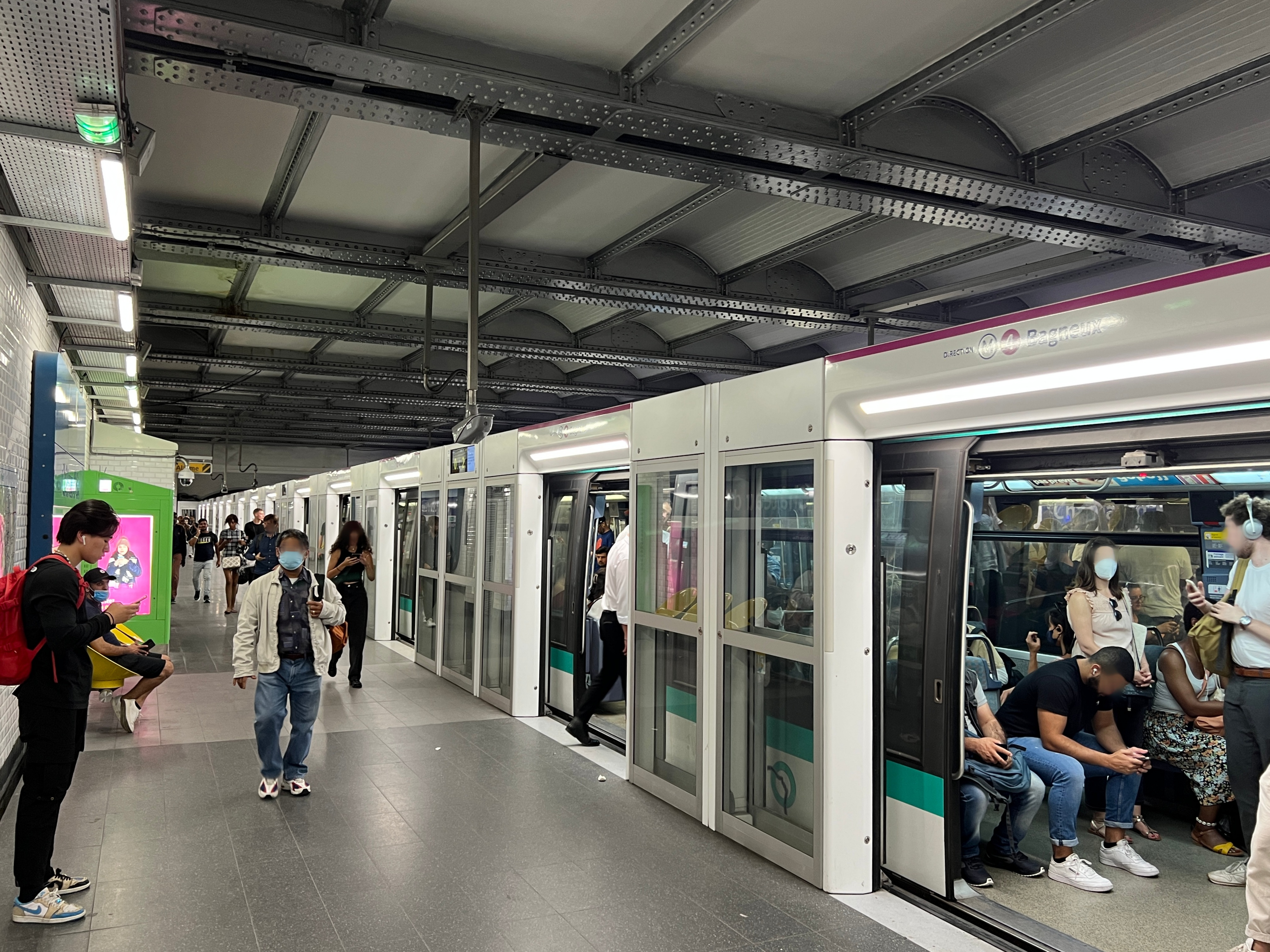
- View of the station's platforms after platform screen doors were installed

General information
- Location: 51/53, Boul. de Strasbourg; 10th arrondissement of Paris; Île-de-France; France
- Coordinates: 48°52′22″N 2°21′22″E
- Owner: RATP
- Operator: RATP

Other information
- Fare zone: 1

History
- Opened: 21 April 1908

Services
Preceding station	Paris Metro	Following station
Strasbourg–Saint-Denis towards Bagneux–Lucie Aubrac	Line 4	Gare de l'Est towards Porte de Clignancourt
Location
- Location within Paris

Château d'Eau (French pronunciation: [ʃɑto do]; literal translation: Water Tower) is a station on Line 4 of the Paris Metro. Located in the 10th arrondissement, it features two entrances by Hector Guimard which were classified as a monument historique on 29 May 1978 by the Ministry of Culture.

== Location ==
The station is located under the Boulevard de Strasbourg at the level of the Rue du Château-d'Eau.

== History ==
Château d'Eau station lies within the 10th arrondissement of Paris, at the intersection of the Boulevard de Strasbourg and the Rue du Château d'Eau, the latter of which gives its name to the station. The road, in turn, received its name from the square to the east of the current station that was known as the Place du Château d'Eau until 1879. The fountain in the square, known as the Girard Fountain, served as a water tower (thus the term château d'eau) until it was replaced by the David Fountain. The fountains were absorbed into the new Place de la République in 1880.

The surrounding area is mostly residential in nature. However, the Gare de l'Est and Place de République are within short walking distance, especially the latter which is a 500 m (1,640 ft) walk down the Rue du Château d'Eau. Château d'Eau station opened on 21 April 1908 as part of the initial stretch of Line 4 from Porte de Clignancourt in the north to Châtelet in the heart of Paris.

On 1 April 2016, half of the name plates on the station's platforms were replaced by the RATP as an April Fool Day joke, as with twelve other stations. Château d'Eau was humorously renamed Château de sable (Sand Castle).

In 2019, 3,878,260 passengers entered this station, making it the 125th most used in the network.

== Passenger services ==
=== Access ===
Access to the station is provided by two stairways at 51 and 53 Boulevard de Strasbourg; an exit is provided at 40 Rue du Château d'Eau with an upwards escalator to the street. Château d'Eau is one of a series of status on Line 4 which run underneath the north–south axis created by Boulevard de Strasbourg and Boulevard de Sébastopol. This is in part due to the cut-and-cover nature of the Paris Metro, in which a major thoroughfare was dug up from street level and then re-covered after the tracks and stations were built.

=== Station layout ===
Street Level

B1	Mezzanine for platform connection

Line 4 platform level	Side platforms with PSDs, doors will open on the right
Line 4 platform level	Northbound	← toward Porte de Clignancourt (Gare de l'Est)
Line 4 platform level	Southbound	toward Bagneux–Lucie Aubrac (Strasbourg–Saint-Denis) →
Line 4 platform level	Side Platforms with PSDs, doors will open on the right

=== Platforms ===
Like most Paris Métro stations, Château d'Eau station uses a side platform configuration with two tracks. As the Paris Métro runs inversely to normal French trains, the eastern platform is used by northbound trains to Porte de Clignancourt and the western platform by southbound ones to Mairie de Montrouge. The ceiling is a metal apron, with silver beams supported by vertical walls. The decoration is in the Ouï-dire colour style of green. The lighting frames, are of the same colour, supported by curved canopies in the shape of a scythe. The direct lighting is white while the indirect lighting, projected on the ceiling, is multi-coloured. The metal beams supporting the metal apron are silver. The grey ceramic tiles are large, square and flat and cover the walls and tunnel exits. The advertising frames are green and cylindrical and the name of the station is written with the Parisine font on enamelled plate. The platforms are equipped with grey assis-debout seats. As part of the automation of Line 4, its platforms have been upgraded to platform screen doors. These were installed between May and July 2019.

=== Bus connections ===
The station is served by the 32, 38 and 39 lines of the RATP bus network and, at night, by the N13 and N14 lines of the Noctilien bus network.

== Gallery ==
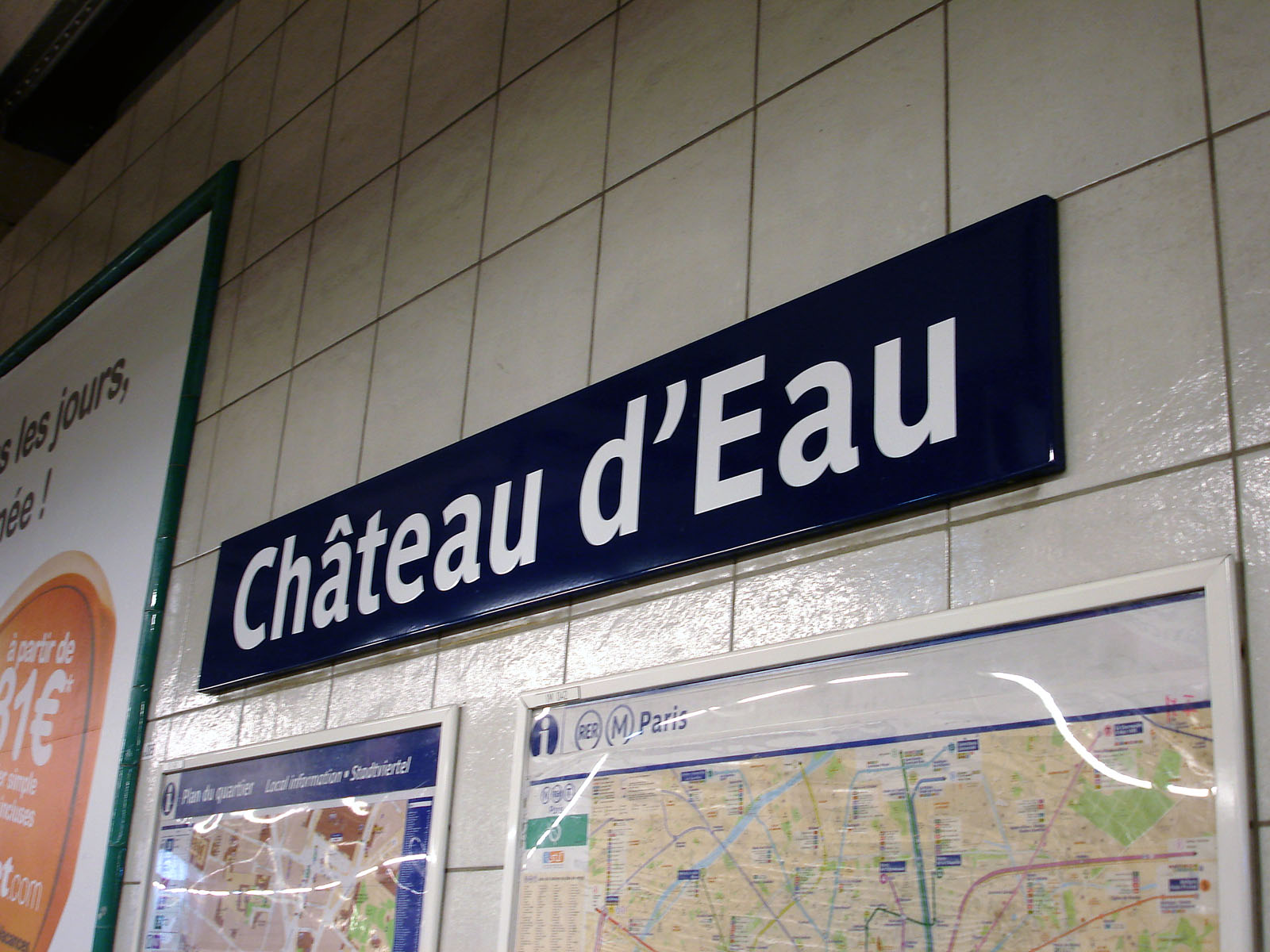
Platform signage

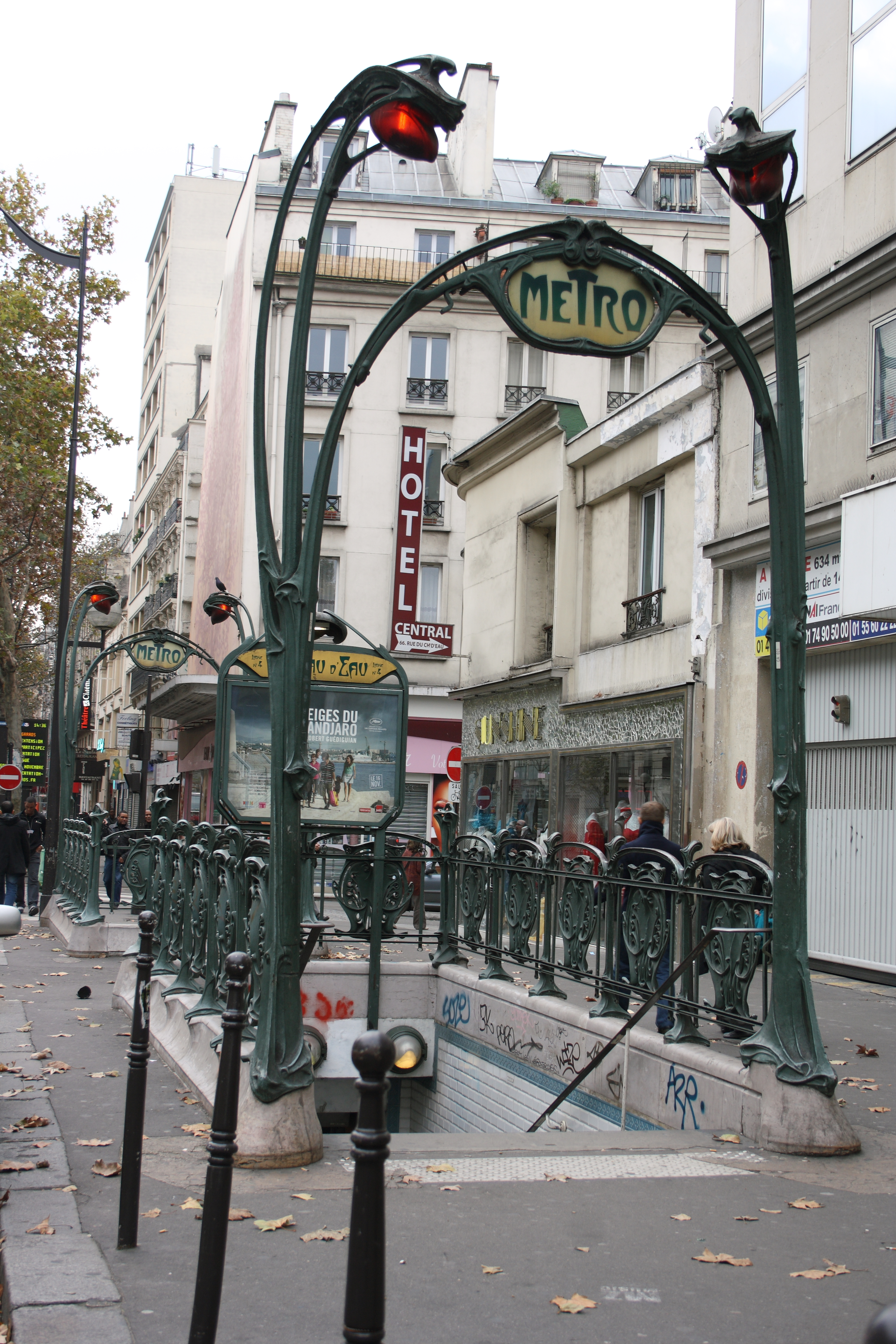
Entrance to Château d'Eau station
