= Villejuif station =

Villejuif station may refer to several stations on the Paris Metro:

- Villejuif–Gustave Roussy station, Line 14 (Line 15 planned)
- Villejuif–Léo Lagrange station, Line 7
- Villejuif–Louis Aragon station, Line 7 (Line 15 planned)
- Villejuif–Paul Vaillant-Couturier station, Line 7
