= Stalingrad station (Paris Metro) =

Métro station in Paris, France

Stalingrad
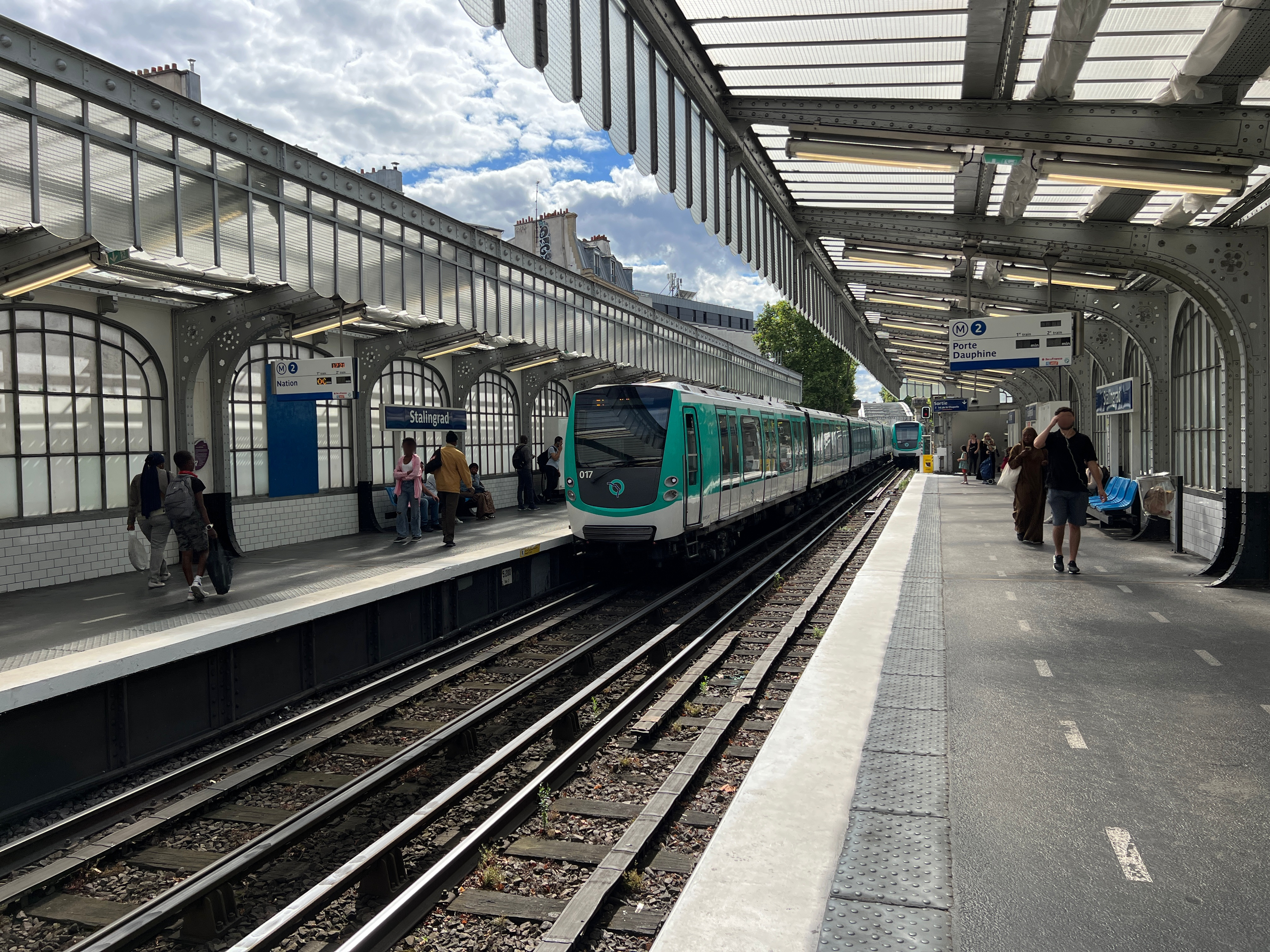
- Line 2 platforms

General information
- Location: 1, Rue d'Aubervilliers; 244, Boul. de la Villette; 86, Rue de l'Aqueduc; 17, Rue de Flandre; 18, Rue de Flandre; 1, Quai de la Seine; 58, Rue du Château Landon; 10th and 19th arrondissement of Paris; Île-de-France; France
- Coordinates: 48°53′03″N 2°21′57″E
- Owner: RATP
- Operator: RATP
- Lines: Line 2 Line 5 Line 7
- Bus routes: : 48, 54; : N13, N41, N42, N45
- Bus operators: RATP, Noctilien

Construction
- Accessible: No

Other information
- Station code: 22-11
- Fare zone: 1

History
- Opened: 31 January 1903; 123 years ago (Line 2); 5 November 1910; 115 years ago (Line 7); 12 October 1942; 83 years ago (Line 5)
- Former names: Aubervilliers (1903–1942); Boulevard de la Villette (1910–1942); Aubervilliers – Boulevard de la Villette (1942–1946)

Services
Preceding station	Paris Metro	Following station
La Chapelle towards Porte Dauphine	Line 2	Jaurès towards Nation
Gare du Nord towards Place d'Italie	Line 5	Jaurès towards Bobigny–Pablo Picasso
Louis Blanc towards Villejuif–Louis Aragon or Mairie d'Ivry	Line 7	Riquet towards La Courneuve–8 mai 1945
Location
- Location within Paris

Stalingrad (French: [stalinɡʁad]) is a Paris Métro station on the border between the 10th arrondissement and 19th arrondissement at the intersection of Lines 2, 5 and 7, located at the Place de la Bataille-de-Stalingrad, which is named after the Battle of Stalingrad.

== History ==
The Line 2 station opened as Rue d'Aubervilliers, named after a nearby street, on 31 January 1903 as part of the extension of line 2 from Anvers to Bagnolet (now called Alexandre Dumas). On 5 November 1910, a separate underground station was opened as part of the first section of line 7 between Opéra and Porte de la Villette a short distance away in the Boulevard de la Villette and named after it.

In 1942, the two stations combined to form Aubervilliers – Boulevard de la Villette. The line 5 opened its corresponding station on 12 October 1942 as part of its extension from Gare du Nord to Église de Pantin. In 1946, the section of the Boulevard de la Villette near the station was named the Place de Stalingrad in honour of the Soviet victory at the Battle of Stalingrad and the station's name was changed to Stalingrad at the same time.

The location remained unchanged until line extensions resumed: Line 7 was extended from Porte de la Villette to Fort d'Aubervilliers in 1979 and La Courneuve – 8 mai 1945 in 1987; a branch was created in the south in 1982 to Le Kremlin-Bicêtre and Villejuif – Louis Aragon in 1985. Line 5 was extended to Bobigny – Pablo Picasso the same year.

The platforms on Line 7 were chosen to be the prototype of Ouï-dire style installation, which were completed in December 1988 before being introduced to twenty other stations being renovated.

In 2018, it saw 7,342,659 travelers enter the station, which places it at the 38th position of metro stations for its attendance.

== Passenger services ==
=== Station layout ===
Line 2 platforms	Side platform, doors will open on the right
Line 2 platforms	Westbound	← toward Porte Dauphine (La Chapelle)
Line 2 platforms	Eastbound	toward Nation (Jaurès) →
Line 2 platforms	Side platform, doors will open on the right
1F	Line 2 mezzanine
Street Level
B1	Mezzanine for platform connection
Line 5 platforms	Side platform, doors will open on the right
Line 5 platforms	Southbound	← toward Place d'Italie (Gare du Nord)
Line 5 platforms	Northbound	toward Bobigny – Pablo Picasso (Jaurès) →
Line 5 platforms	Side platform, doors will open on the right
Line 7 platforms	Side platform, doors will open on the right
Line 7 platforms	Westbound	← toward Villejuif – Louis Aragon or Mairie d'Ivry (Louis Blanc)
Line 7 platforms	Eastbound	toward La Courneuve–8 mai 1945 (Riquet) →
Line 7 platforms	Side platform, doors will open on the right

=== Platforms ===
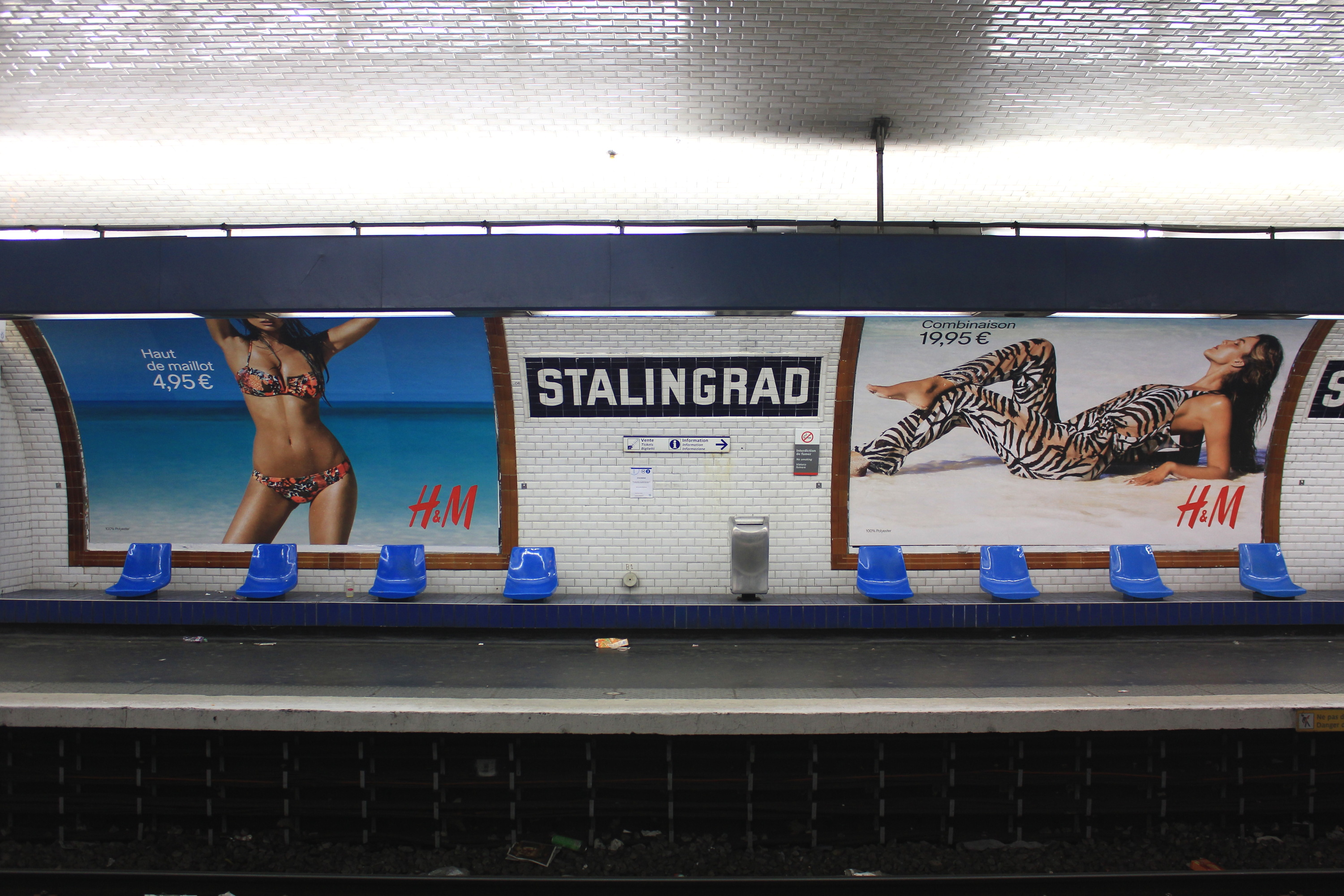
Platform Line 5

The stations of the three lines are of a standard configuration with two platforms separated by the railway lines. The platforms of Line 2 are above-ground, located on a viaduct, while those of Lines 5 and 7 are underground, under an elliptical arch. Line 2 platforms are equipped with glass awnings, as are all above-ground stations on the line. Lighting is achieved through white neon lighting tubes. The steel pillars and spandrels incorporate ground glass windows which sit atop white and flat ceramic tiles. The platforms, devoid of advertising, are equipped with white Motte style benches and the name of the station is written in Parisine font on enamelled plates.

The platforms of Line 5 are arranged in the Andreu-Motte style blue colour: they have two lighting strips in this shade, as well as seating and spandrels covered with flat tiling of the same hue. They are equipped with Motte blue and white seats. This decoration is married with the white bevelled tiling which covers the walls, vault, and the outlets of the corridors. The name of the station is inscribed in faience in the original CMP style. The advertising frames are special: in brown faience and with simple patterns, they are surmounted by the letter M. These same frames are only present in seven other Paris metro stations.

The platforms of Line 7 are laid out in the Ouï-dire style blue colour: the two lighting strips of the same colour, are supported by curved shaped false consoles. The direct lighting is white, while unlike most bands of this style, there is no multi-coloured indirect lighting present yet. The flat white ceramic tiles cover the walls, vault, and the tunnel exits but not the outlets of the corridors which are covered with white bevelled tiles, this last point also constituting an exception to the Ouï-dire style. The name of the station is written in Parisine font on enamelled plates and the Motte seating is blue. Advertising frames are metallic instead of the blue half-circle, which is another exception to the Ouï-dire style.

=== Bus connections ===
The station is served by Lines 45, 48 and 54 of the RATP bus network and at night, by Line N42 of the Noctilien bus network.

== Nearby attractions ==
Nearby are the Rotonde de la Villette (part of the Barrière Saint-Martin, a gate built for the collection of taxation as part of the Wall of the Farmers-General between 1784 and 1788), the Bassin de la Villette (an artificial lake) and the Canal Saint-Martin.

== Gallery ==
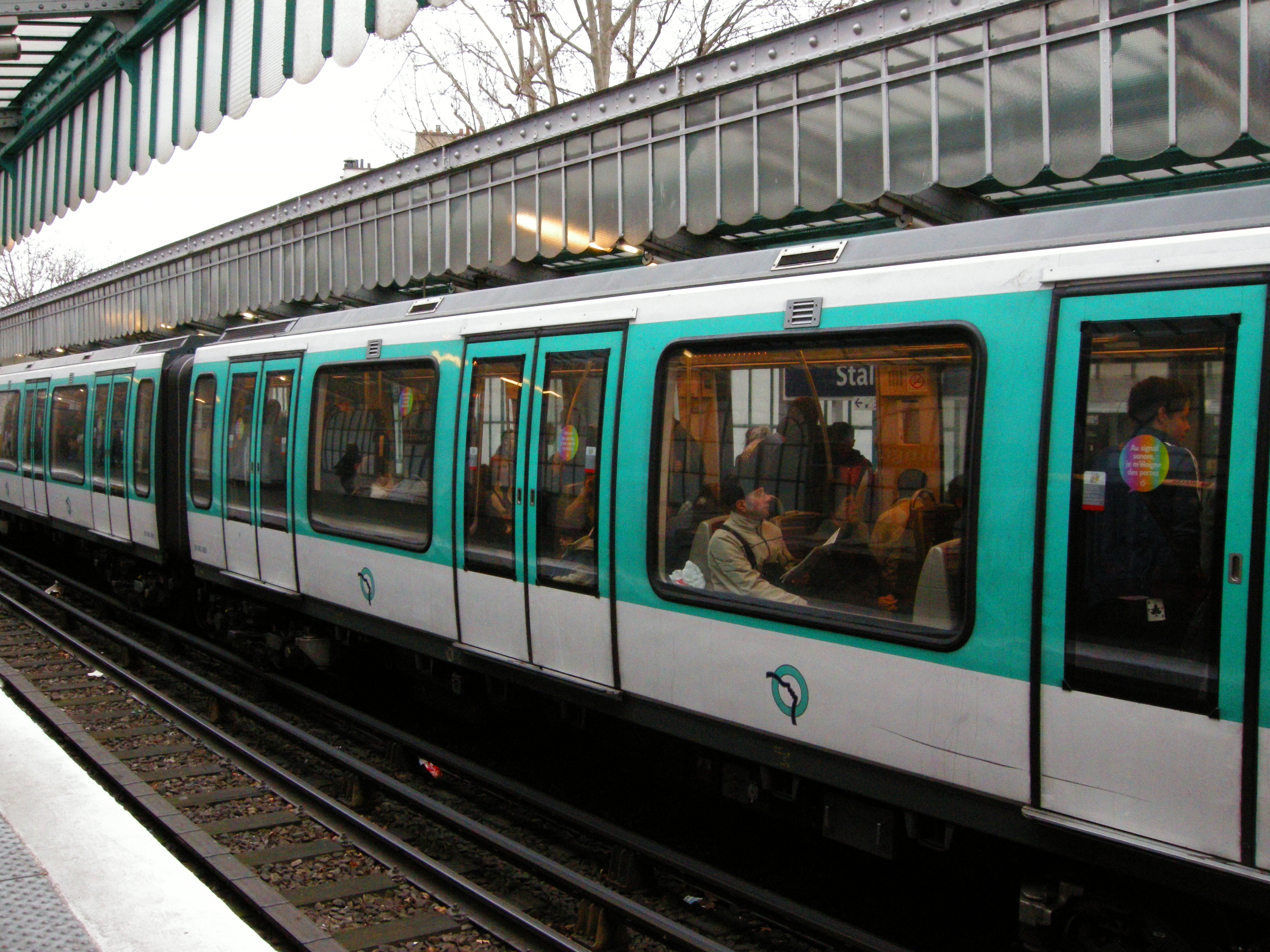
Line 2: MF 2000 rolling stock at Stalingrad

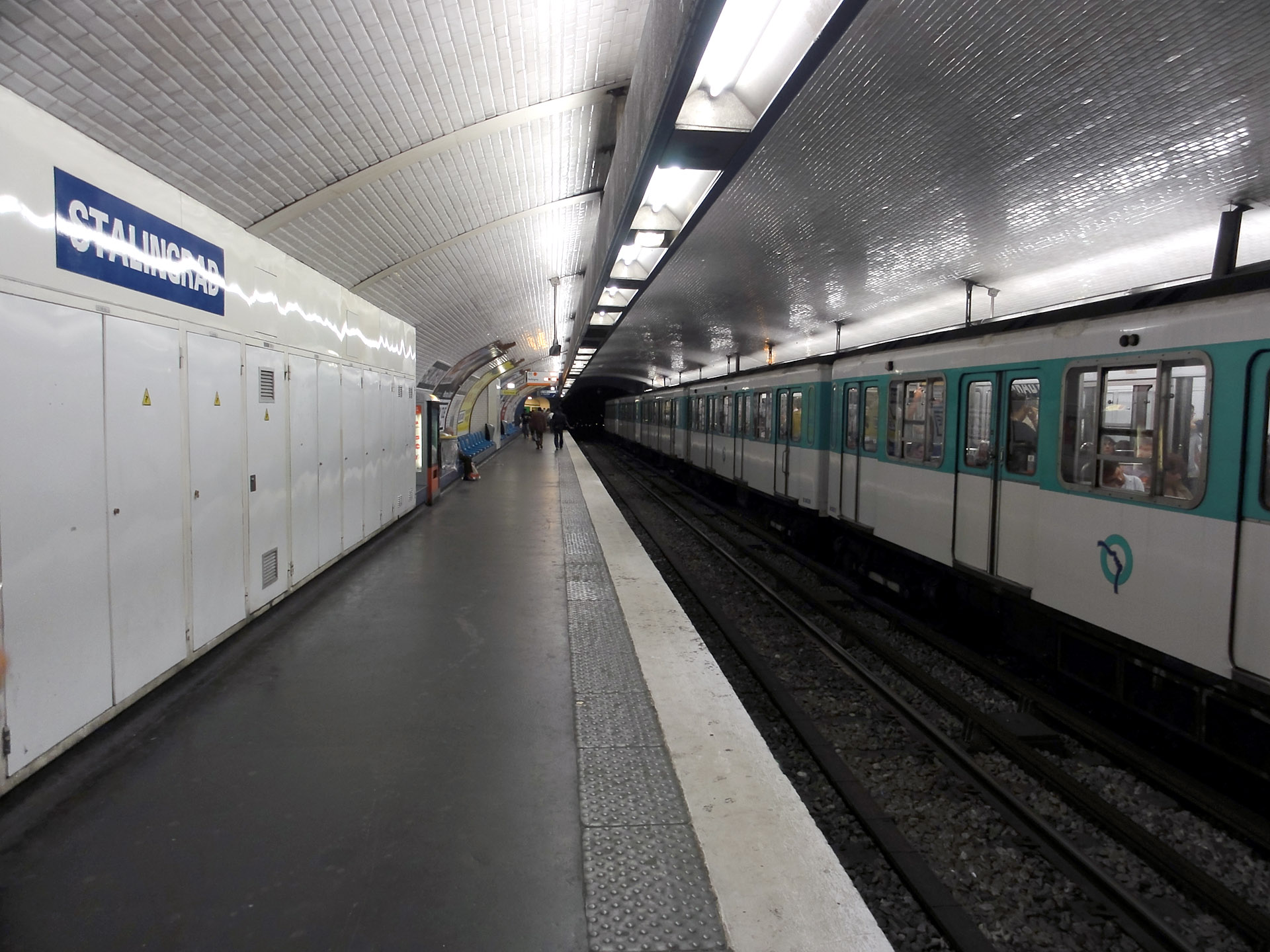
Line 5: MF 67 rolling stock at Stalingrad

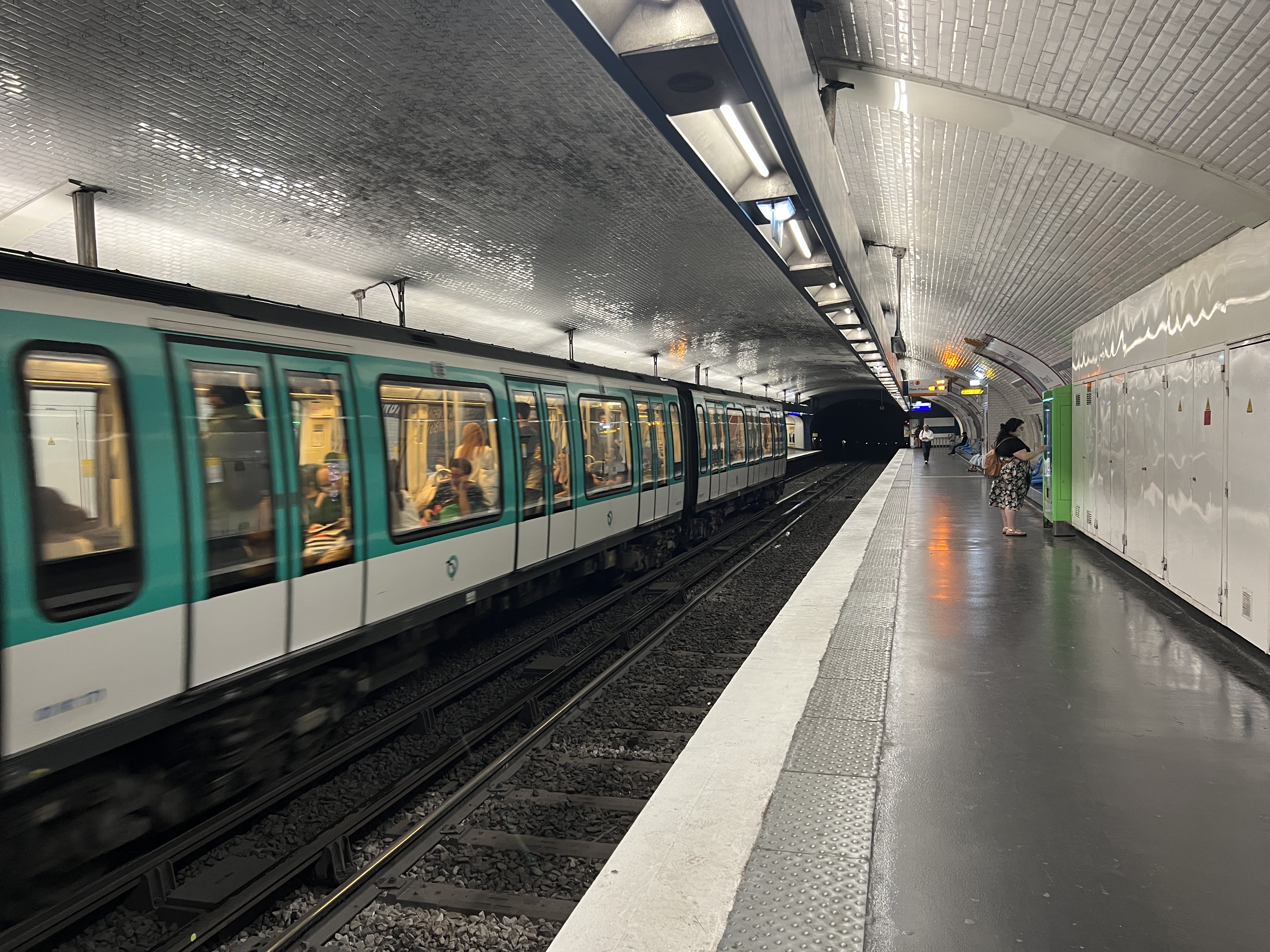
MF 01 on Line 5

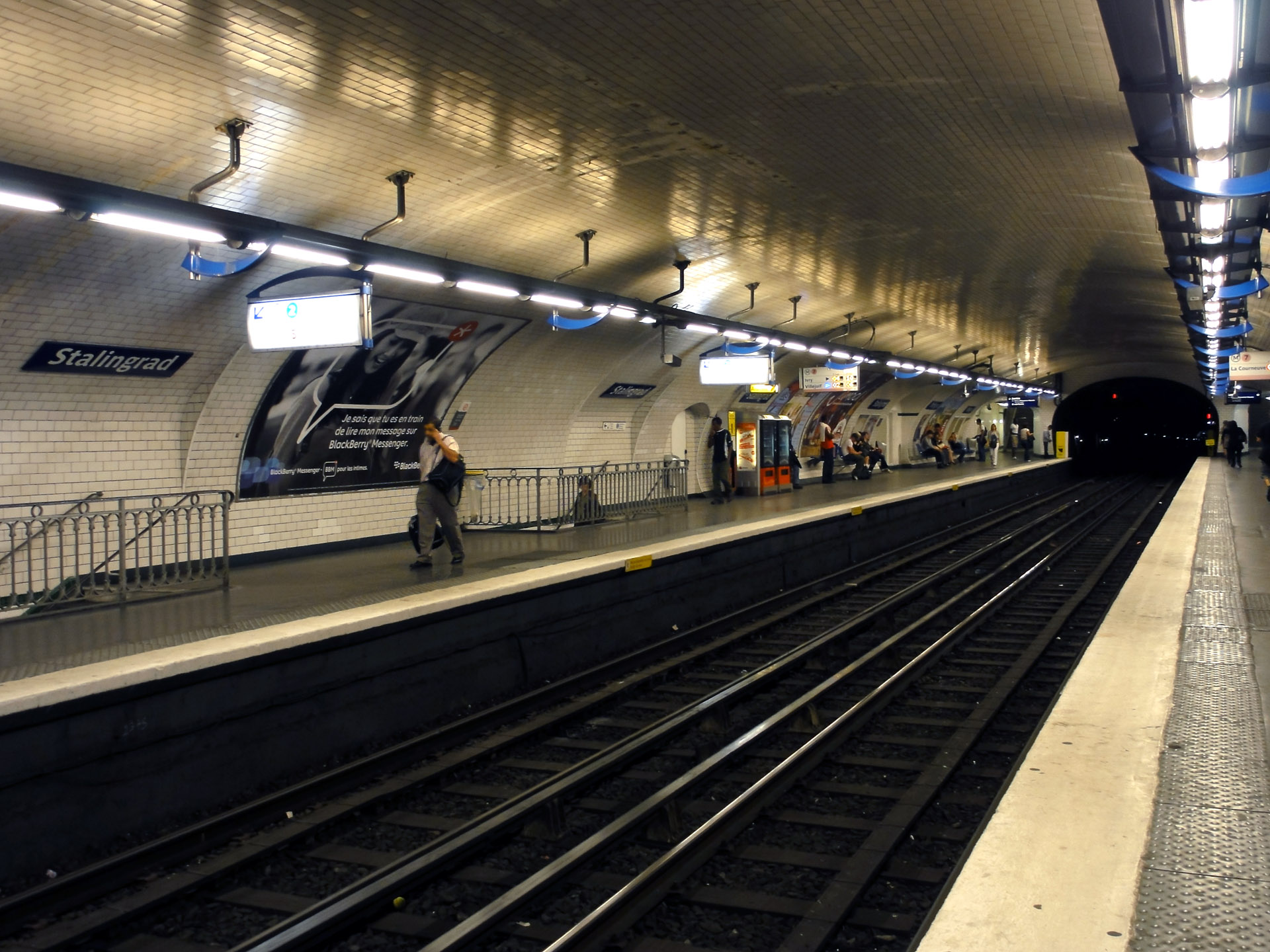
Line 7 platforms

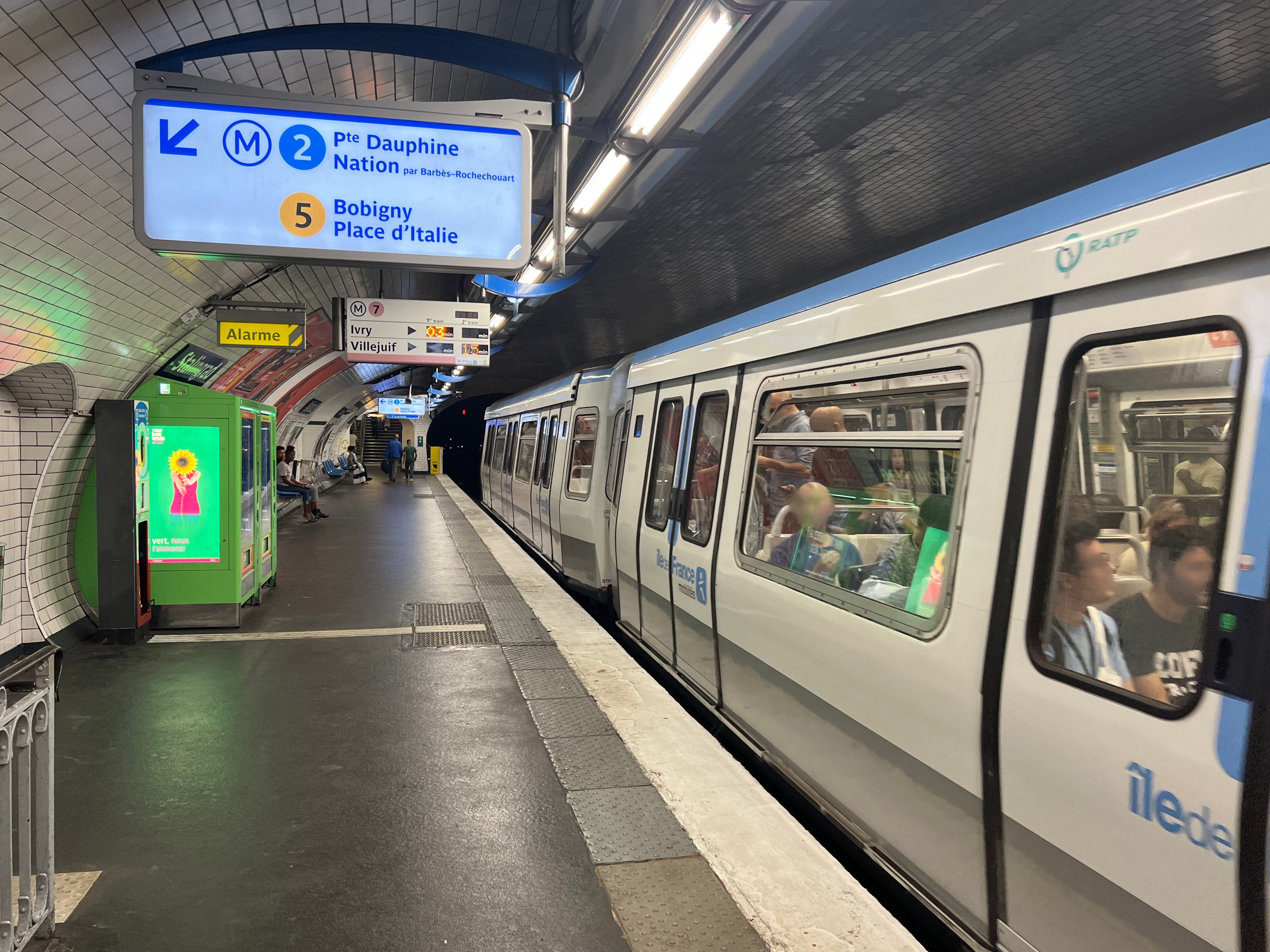
Line 7: MF 77 rolling stock at Stalingrad

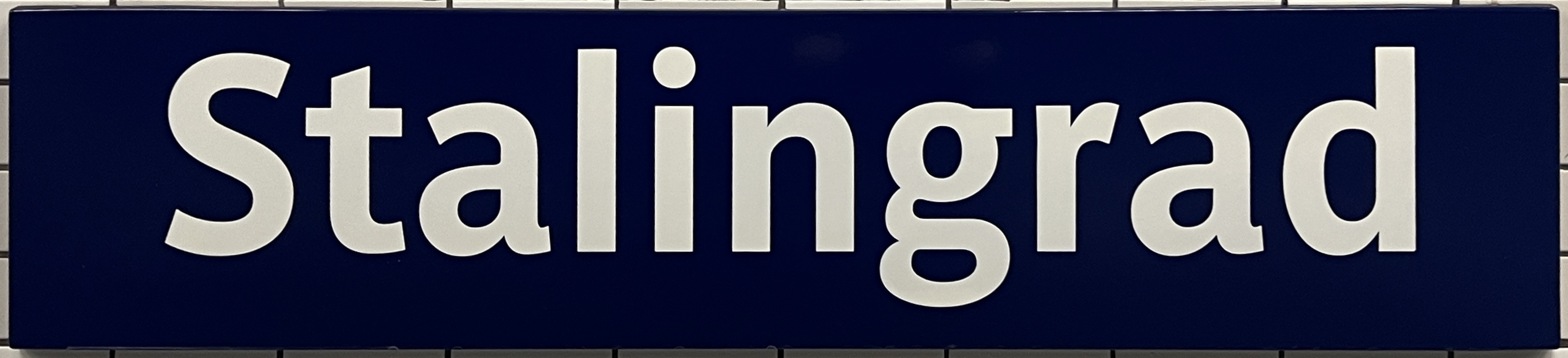
Stalingrad metro sign
