= Riquet station =

Station of the Paris Métro in France

Riquet
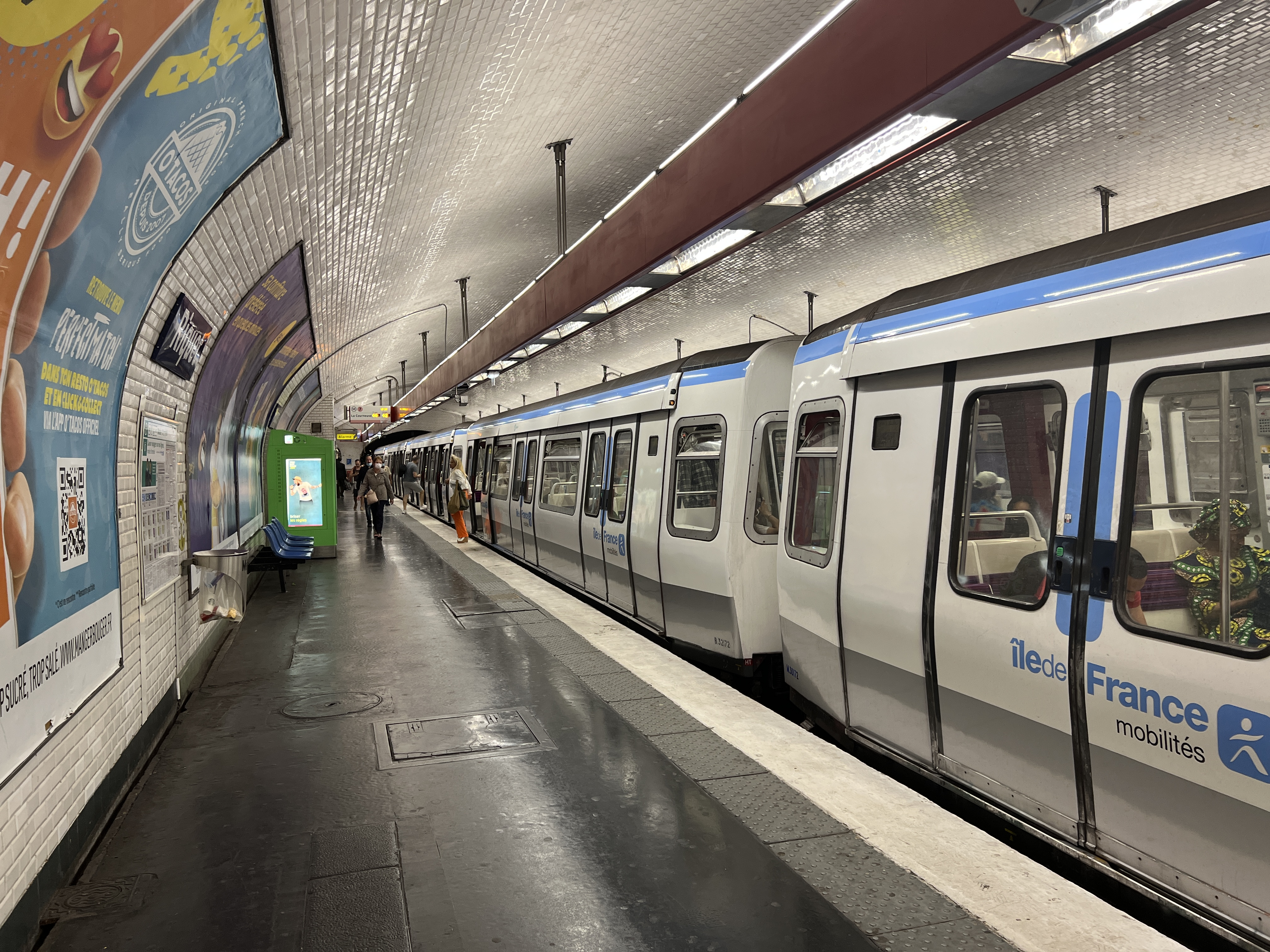

General information
- Location: 19th arrondissement of Paris; Île-de-France; France
- Coordinates: 48°53′16″N 2°22′25″E
- System: Paris Métro station
- Owner: RATP
- Operator: RATP
- Line: Paris Metro Paris Metro Line 7
- Platforms: 2 (2 side platforms)
- Tracks: 2

Other information
- Station code: 22-08
- Fare zone: 1

History
- Opened: 5 November 1910; 115 years ago

Passengers
- 1,226,397 (2020)

Services
Preceding station	Paris Metro	Following station
Stalingrad towards Villejuif–Louis Aragon or Mairie d'Ivry	Line 7	Crimée towards La Courneuve–8 mai 1945
Location
- Location within Paris

Riquet (French pronunciation: [ʁikɛ]) is a station of the Paris Métro and located in the 19th arrondissement of Paris.

== History ==
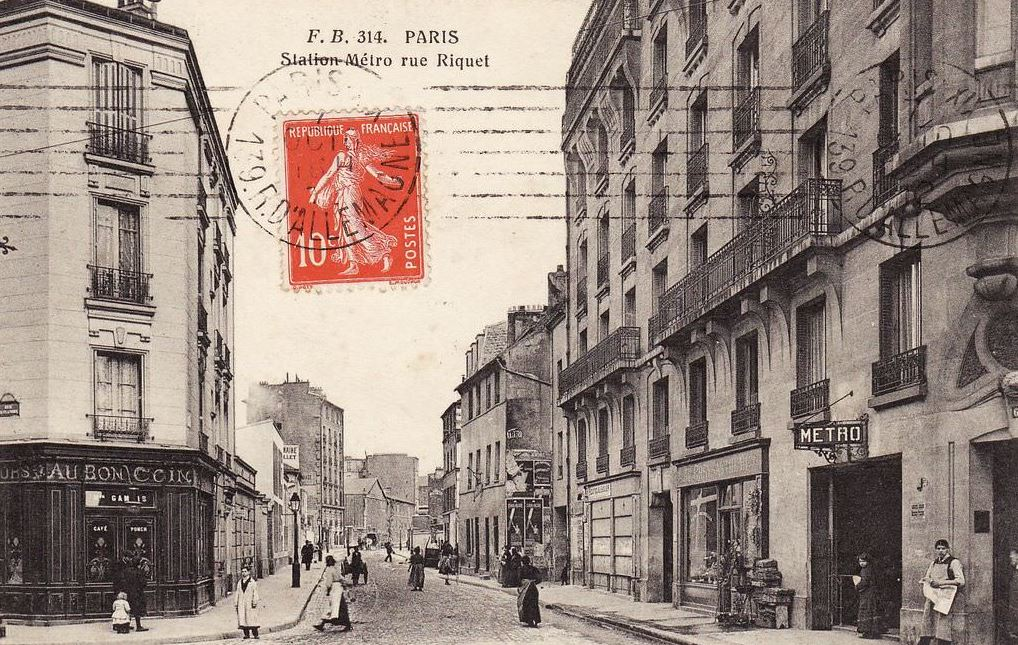
The station shortly after opening at rue Riquet

Riquet opened on 5 November 1910 with the commissioning of the first section of line 7 between Opéra and Porte de la Villette with service provided by all trains on the line until 18 January 1911, when a branch opened from Louis Blanc to Pré-Saint-Gervais, resulting in 1 of every 2 trains serving this branch. It was once again served by all trains on the line when the branch from Louis Blanc to Pré-Saint-Gervais was split to form an independent line, line 7bis, on 3 December 1967. As part of the Un métro + beau programme by the RATP, the station was renovated and modernised on 28 January 2003.

It was named after French engineer Pierre-Paul Riquet (born Béziers, 1609; died Toulouse, 1680), who conceived and carried out the construction of the Canal du Midi from 1666. This work was completed by his sons in 1681.

In 2019, the station was used by 2,312,581 passengers, making it the 223rd busiest of the Métro network, out of 302 stations.

In 2020, the station was used by 1,226,397 passengers amidst the COVID-19 pandemic, making it the 210th busiest of the Métro network, out of 305 stations.

== Passenger services ==
=== Access ===
The station has 2 entrances:

- Entrance 1: Rue Riquet
- Entrance 2: Avenue de Flandre

=== Station layout ===
Street Level
B1	Mezzanine
Line 7 platforms	Side platform, doors will open on the right
Line 7 platforms	Southbound	← toward Villejuif – Louis Aragon or Mairie d'Ivry (Stalingrad)
Line 7 platforms	Northbound	toward La Courneuve–8 mai 1945 (Crimée) →
Line 7 platforms	Side platform, doors will open on the right

=== Platforms ===
Riquet has a standard configuration with two tracks surrounded by two side platforms, although the lower part of the walls are vertical instead of a typical elliptical shape. The decoration is in the Andreu-Motte style with two red luminous lighting canopies and Motte seats whose colour, changed from red to blue, breaking the colorimetric uniformity of said style. The bevelled white ceramic tiles cover the wall, vault, tunnel exits and outlets of the corridors. The advertising frames are metallic and the name of the station is inscribed in Parisine font on enamelled plates.

=== Other connections ===
The station is also served by line 45 of the RATP bus network, and at night, by line N42 of the Noctilien bus network.

== Nearby ==
- la Villette Basin
- Canal de l'Ourcq.

== Gallery ==
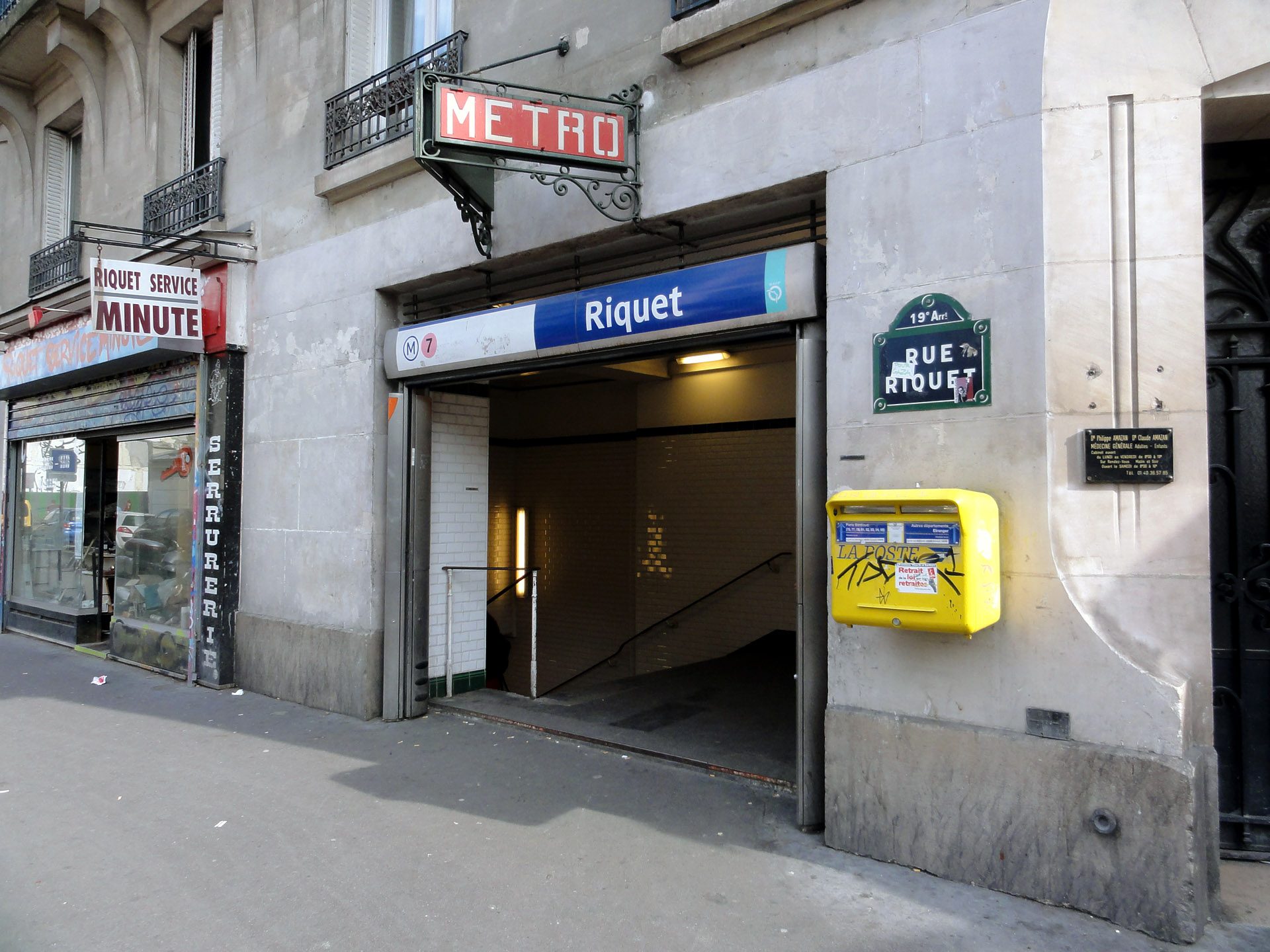
Entrance at rue Riquet today

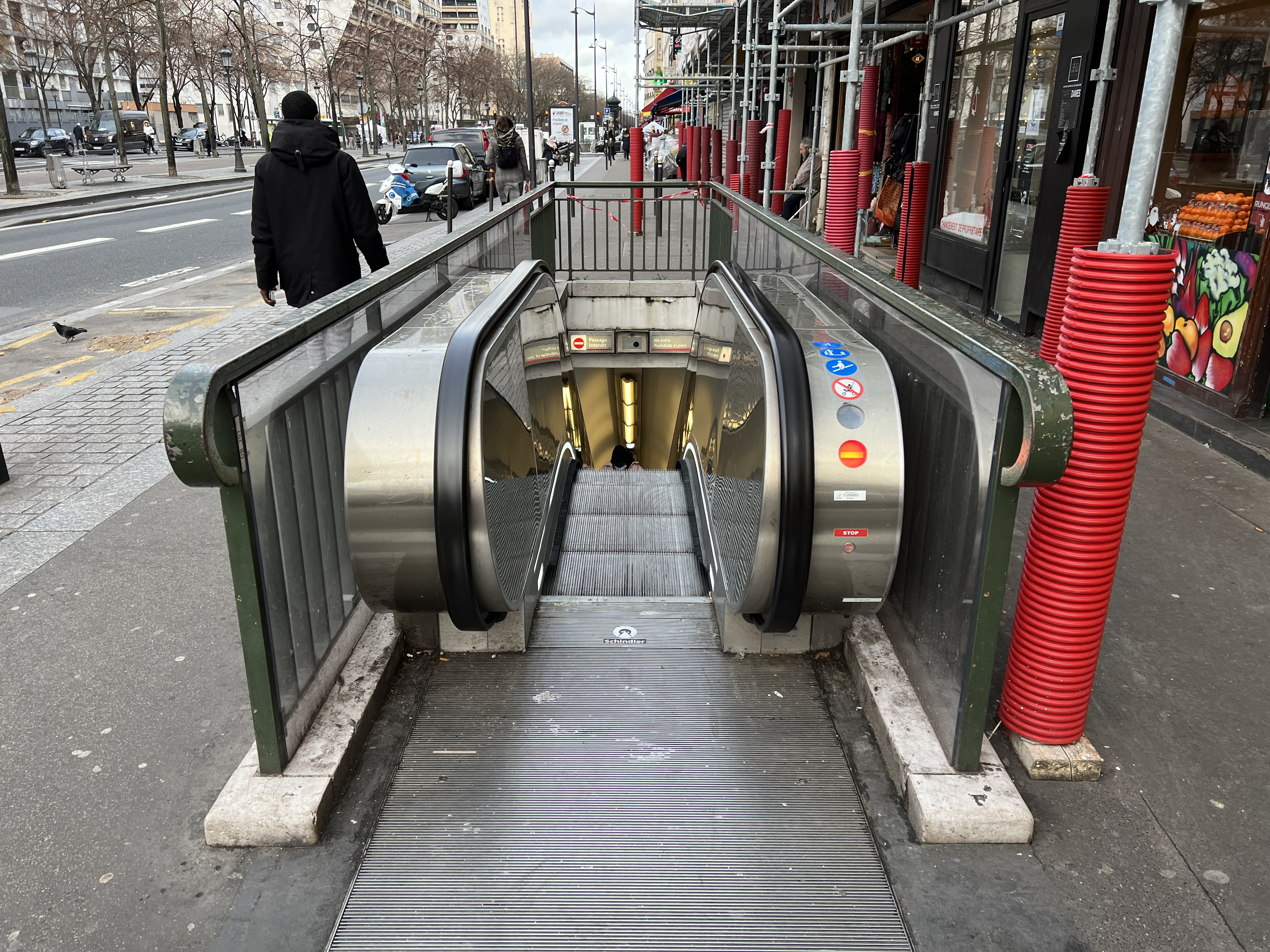
Entrance at avenue de Flandre
