= Villejuif–Paul Vaillant-Couturier station =

Metro station in Paris, France

Villejuif–Paul Vaillant-Couturier
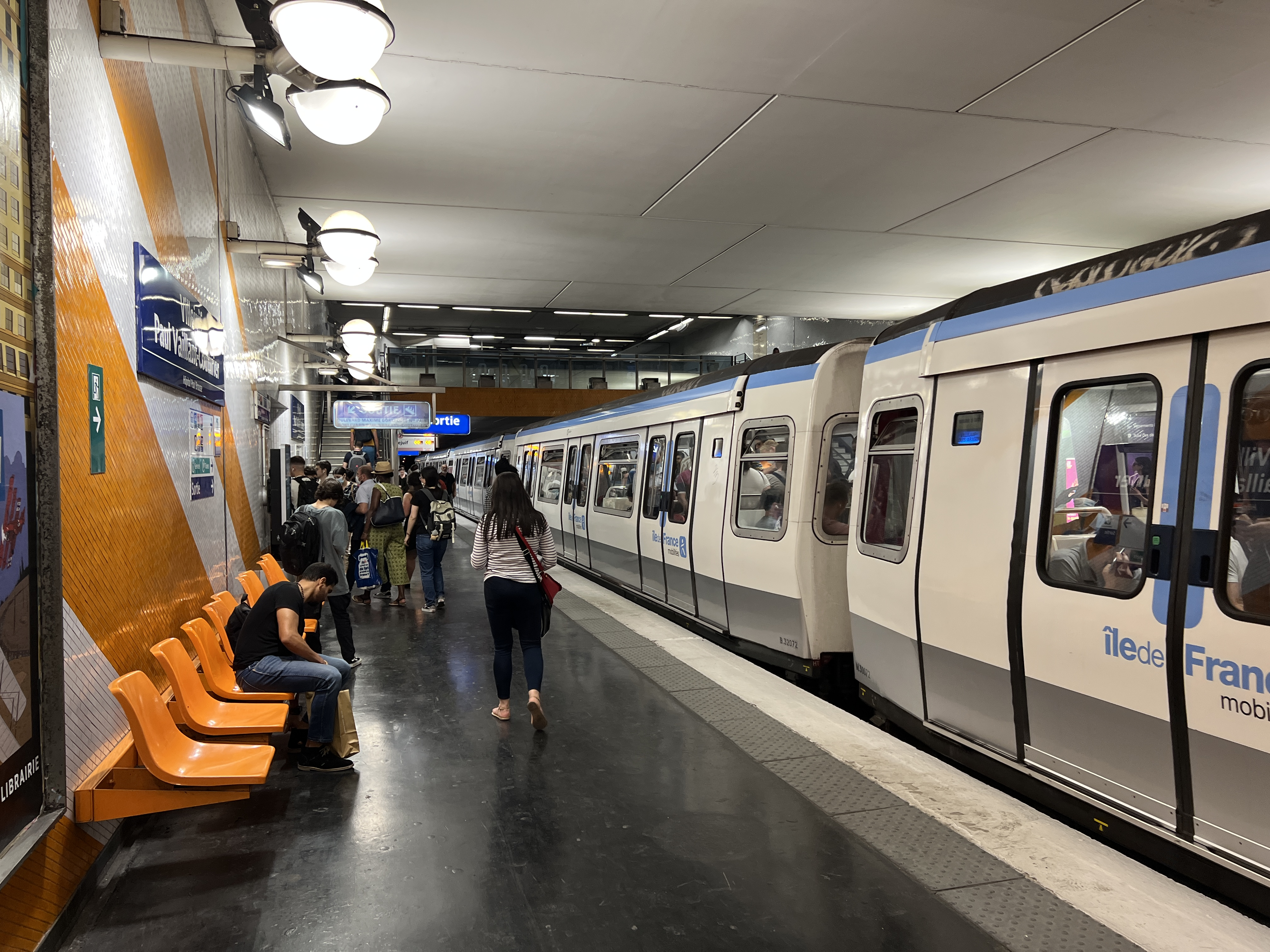

General information
- Location: 39, boulevard Maxime Gorky; 45, boulevard Maxime Gorky; Even side, boulevard Maxime Gorky; Villejuif; Île-de-France; France
- Coordinates: 48°47′46″N 2°22′06″E
- System: Paris Métro station
- Owner: RATP
- Operator: RATP

Other information
- Fare zone: 2

History
- Opened: 28 February 1985; 41 years ago

Services
Preceding station	Paris Metro	Following station
Villejuif–Louis Aragon Terminus	Line 7 Villejuif branch	Villejuif–Léo Lagrange towards La Courneuve–8 mai 1945
Location
- Location within Paris and inner ring

Villejuif–Paul Vaillant-Couturier (French pronunciation: [vilʒɥif pɔl vajɑ̃ kutyʁje]) is a station of the Paris Métro, located on Line 7. It serves the commune of Villejuif.

== History ==
It was opened when Line 7 was extended from Le Kremlin-Bicêtre to Villejuif–Louis Aragon on 28 February 1985.

It is named after the Avenue Paul Vaillant-Couturier and the former mayor of Villejuif, Paul Vaillant-Couturier (1892–1937) who was a journalist, politician and editor of the Communist newspaper L’Humanité.

In 2021, usage of the station gradually increased, with 1,764,879 passengers during the year. This made it the 200th most used metro station.

== Passenger services ==
=== Access ===
The station has three entrances:

- Access 1 Boulevard Maxime-Gorki/Rue Jean-Baptiste-Clément, with a fixed staircase;
- Access 2 Boulevard Maxime-Gorki/Rue Condorcet, on the even numbers side, with a fixed staircase and an escalator. This entrance is indicated by a mast surmounted by a yellow M logo;
- Access 3 Maxim Gorky Boulevard, with a fixed staircase, also indicated by a mast surmounted by a yellow M logo.

=== Station layout ===
Street Level

B1	Connecting level

Line 7 platforms	Side platform, doors will open on the right
Line 7 platforms	Southbound	← toward Villejuif–Louis Aragon (Terminus)
Line 7 platforms	Northbound	toward La Courneuve–8 mai 1945 (Villejuif–Léo Lagrange) →
Line 7 platforms	Side platform, doors will open on the right

=== Platforms ===
Villejuif–Paul Vaillant-Couturier is a standard configuration station. It has two platforms separated by the metro tracks, surmounted by a mezzanine. The name of the station is written in Parisine font on enamelled plates. Lighting is provided by suspended luminous globes, small ceramic tiles of a white and orange colour placed vertically covering the walls as well as the tunnel exits. The furniture is the Motte style in an orange colour.

=== Bus connections ===
The station is served by lines 162 and 185 of the RATP bus network, the v7 urban service of the Valouette bus network and, at night, by lines N15 and N22 of the Noctilien network.

== Nearby ==
- Hôpital Paul-Brousse

== Gallery ==
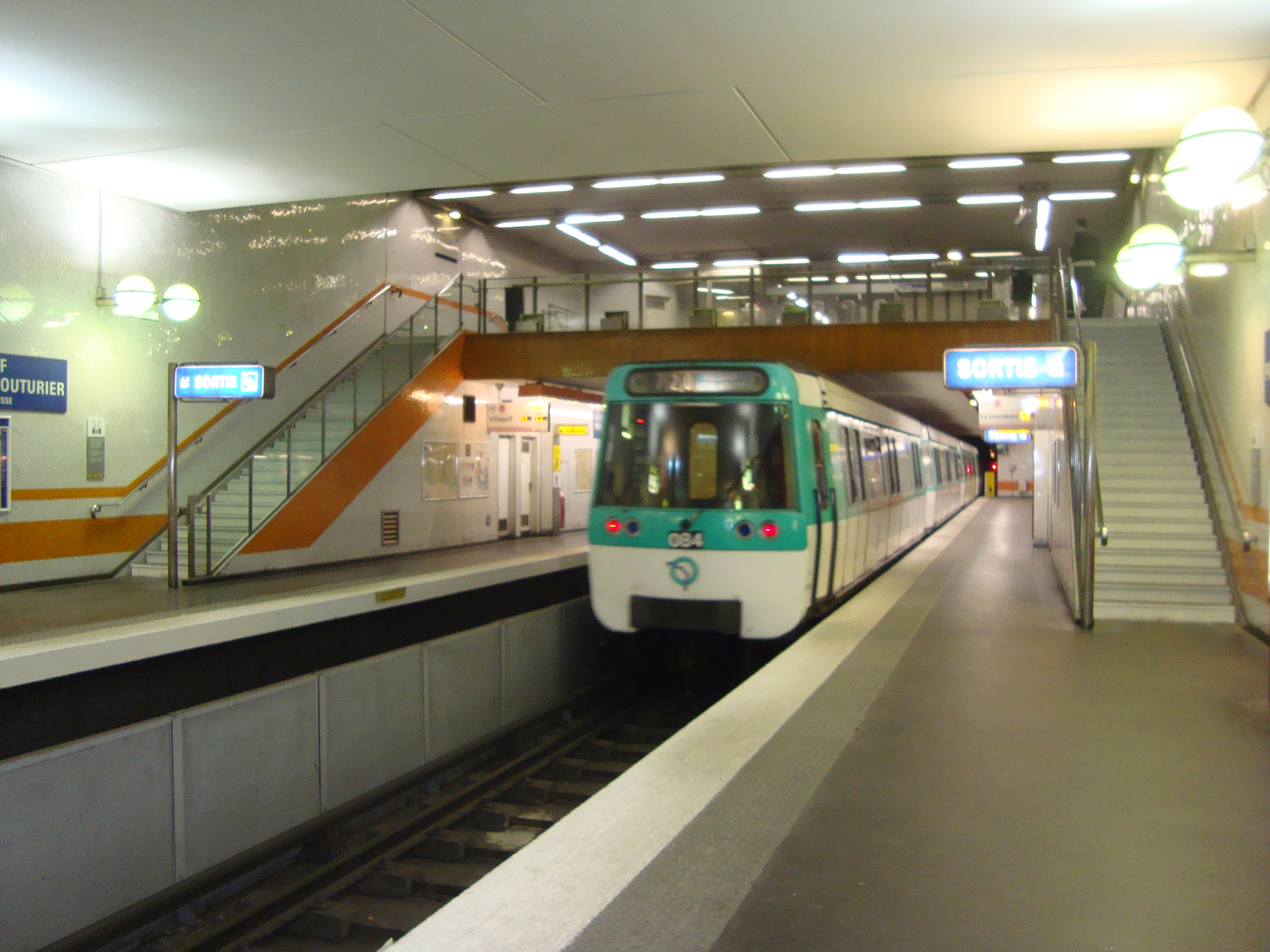
MF 77 rolling stock on Line 7 at Villejuif–Paul Vaillant-Couturier
