= Villejuif–Léo Lagrange station =

Metro station in Paris, France

Villejuif–Léo Lagrange
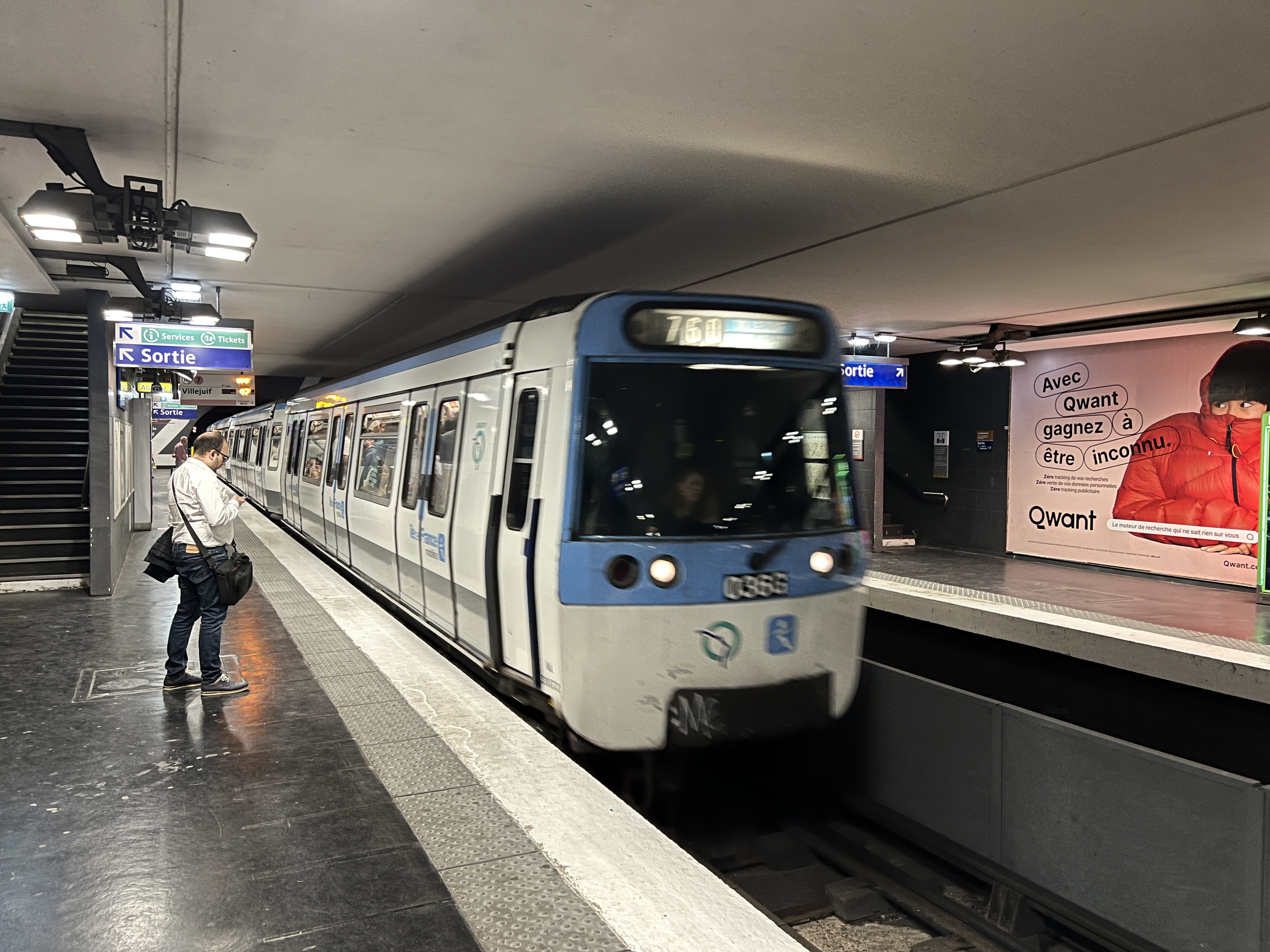

General information
- Location: 34, avenue de Paris; 53, avenue de Paris; Villejuif; Île-de-France; France
- Coordinates: 48°48′14″N 2°21′50″E
- System: Paris Métro station
- Owner: RATP
- Operator: RATP
- Line: Paris Metro Paris Metro Line 7
- Platforms: 2 (2 side platforms)
- Tracks: 2

Construction
- Architect: Mario Cucinella Architects

Other information
- Station code: 26-07
- Fare zone: 2

History
- Opened: 28 February 1985; 41 years ago

Passengers
- 1,500,000 (2020)

Services
Preceding station	Paris Metro	Following station
Villejuif–Paul Vaillant-Couturier towards Villejuif–Louis Aragon	Line 7 Villejuif branch	Le Kremlin–Bicêtre towards La Courneuve–8 mai 1945
Location
- Location within Paris

Villejuif–Léo Lagrange (French pronunciation: [vilʒɥif leo laɡʁɑ̃ʒ]) is a station of the Paris Métro, located on Line 7. It serves the commune of Villejuif.

== History ==
The station opened when Line 7 was extended from Le Kremlin-Bicêtre to Villejuif–Louis Aragon on 28 February 1985. The station is named after Léo Lagrange (1900–1940), a French socialist politician and under-secretary of state for sport, who helped organise the People's Olympiad in Barcelona in opposition to the 1936 Summer Olympics in Berlin and died during the Battle of France. From 1998 to 2000, the station was renovated and redecorated as part of the centenary of the Paris Métro. The station's theme is sports and is decorated with sports exhibits to evoke the atmosphere of a stadium. Various records of the greatest athletes in the history of sports can be found on the walls of the station dating from the 1990s.

In 2019, the station was used by 2,830,893 passengers, making it the 187th busiest of the Métro network, out of 302 stations.

In 2020, the station was used by 1,500,000 passengers amidst the COVID-19 pandemic, making it the 175th busiest of the Métro network, out of 305 stations.

== Passenger services ==
=== Access ===
The station has an ascending escalator, from the platform to the public thoroughfare on the Avenue de Paris. It also has four staircase exits, which are on both sides of the avenue.

=== Station layout ===
Street Level

B1	Mezzanine

Line 7 platforms	Side platform, doors will open on the right
Line 7 platforms	Southbound	← toward Villejuif–Louis Aragon (Villejuif–Paul Vaillant-Couturier)
Line 7 platforms	Northbound	toward La Courneuve–8 mai 1945 (Le Kremlin-Bicêtre) →
Line 7 platforms	Side platform, doors will open on the right

=== Platforms ===
Villejuif–Léo Lagrange has a standard configuration with 2 tracks surrounded by 2 side platforms. Since the 2000 centennial anniversary of the metro, the platforms were renovated and have been decorated with sports motifs. On the walls, you can observe photos, read exploits, and anecdotes or records of the greatest athletes in the history of sport. The records presented, date from the 1990s. Sergei Bubka is a record holder in pole vault, Javier Sotomayor a record holder in high jump, Maurice Greene a record holder of the 100 meters and Alexander Popov a record holder of the 100 meters freestyle.

=== Other connections ===
The station is also served by line 185 of the RATP bus network, v7 of the Valouette bus network, and, at night, by lines N15 and N22 of the Noctilien bus network.

== Gallery ==
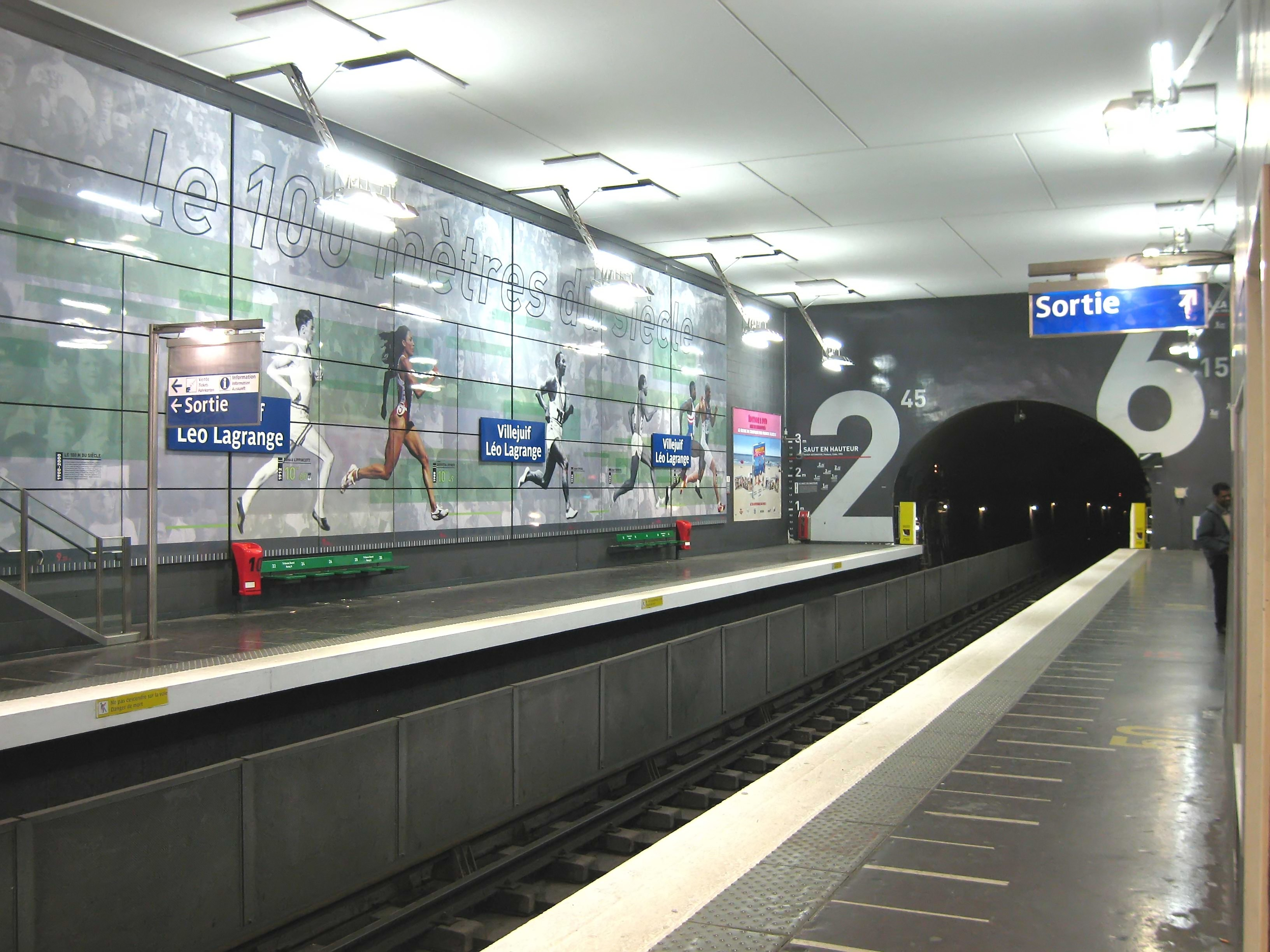
Line 7 platforms at Villejuif–Léo Lagrange

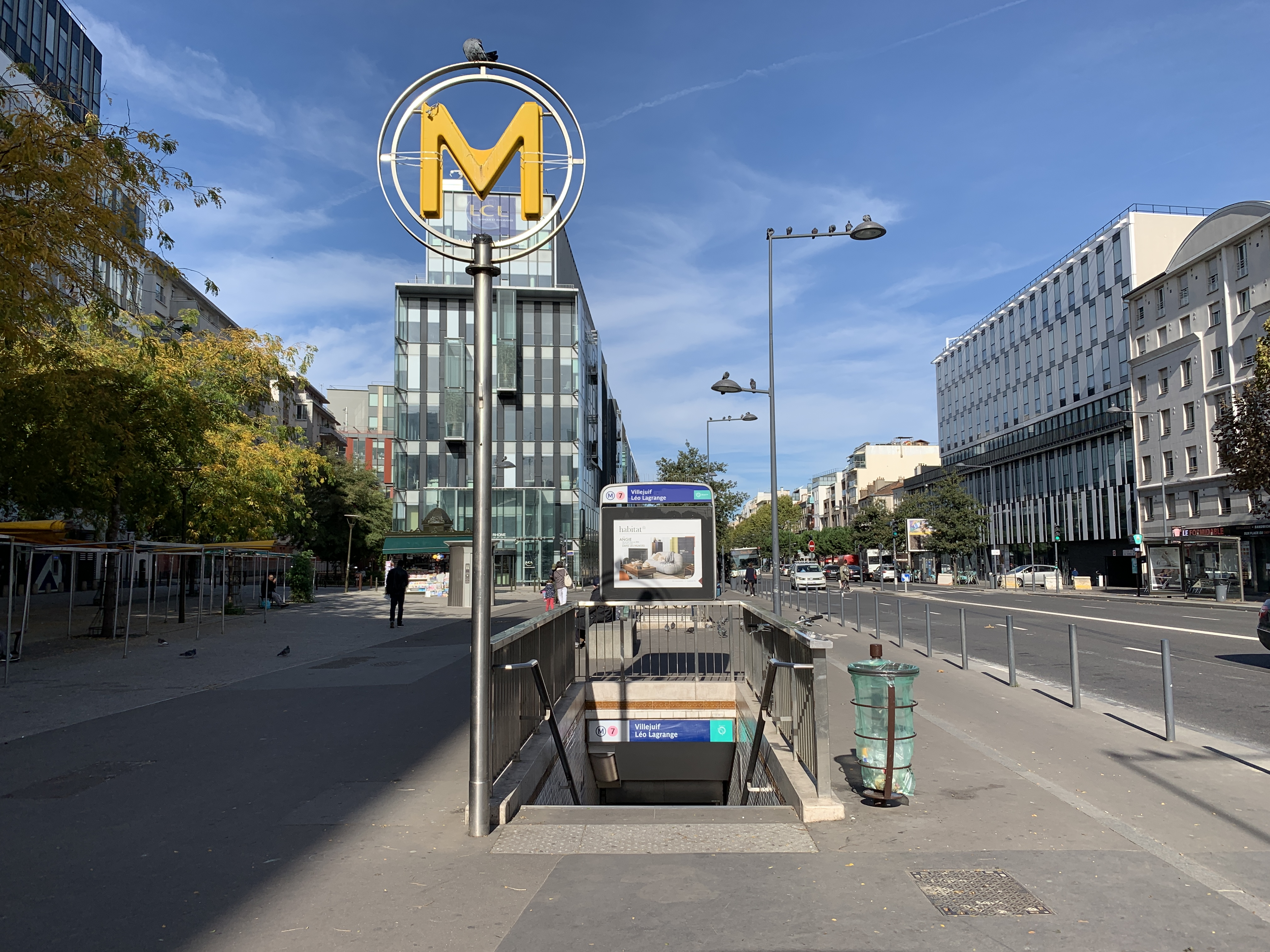
Entrance of Villejuif–Léo Lagrange

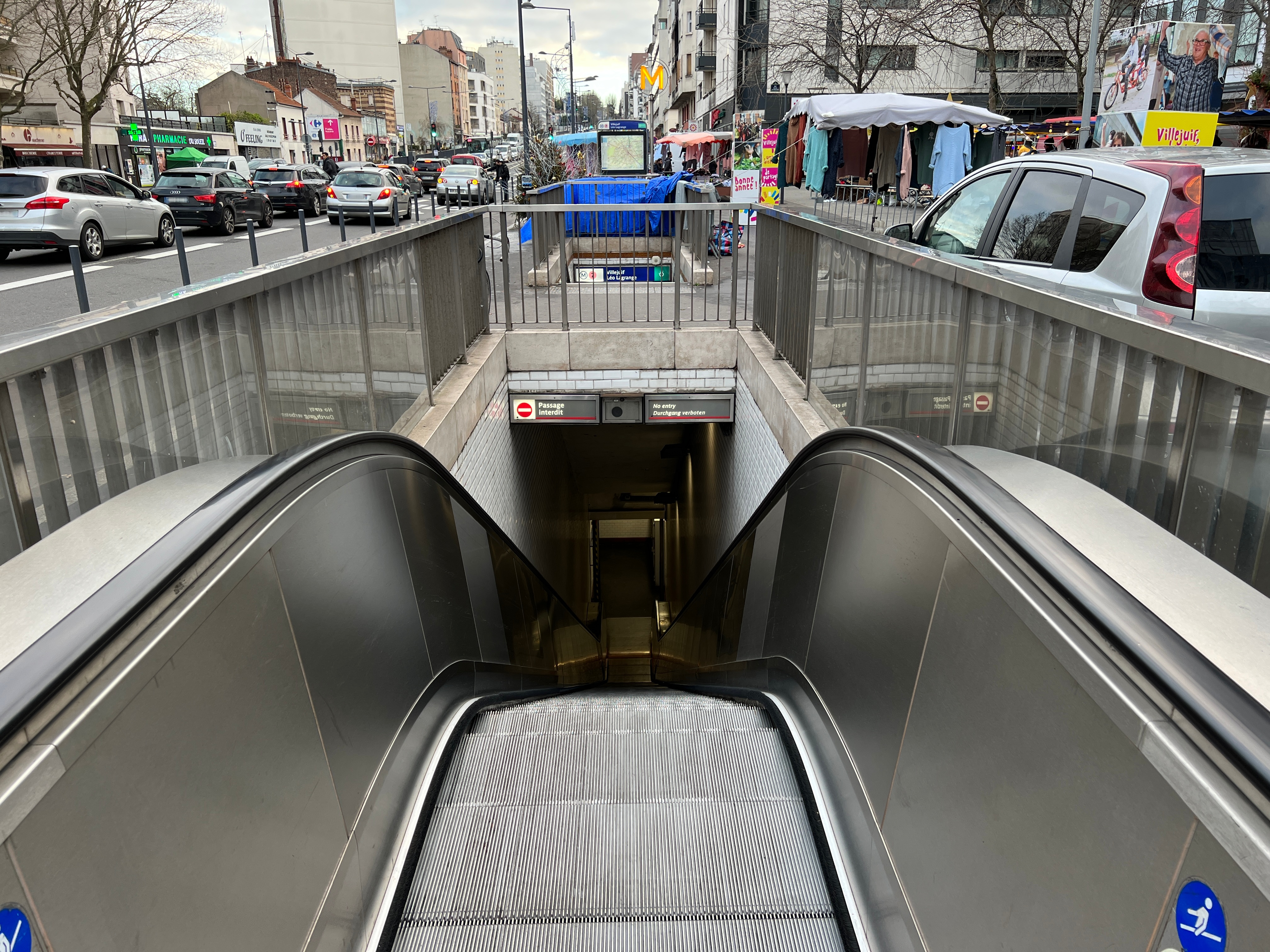
Entrance with an escalator at Villejuif–Léo Lagrange
