= Le Kremlin–Bicêtre station =

Metro station in Paris, France

Le Kremlin–Bicêtre
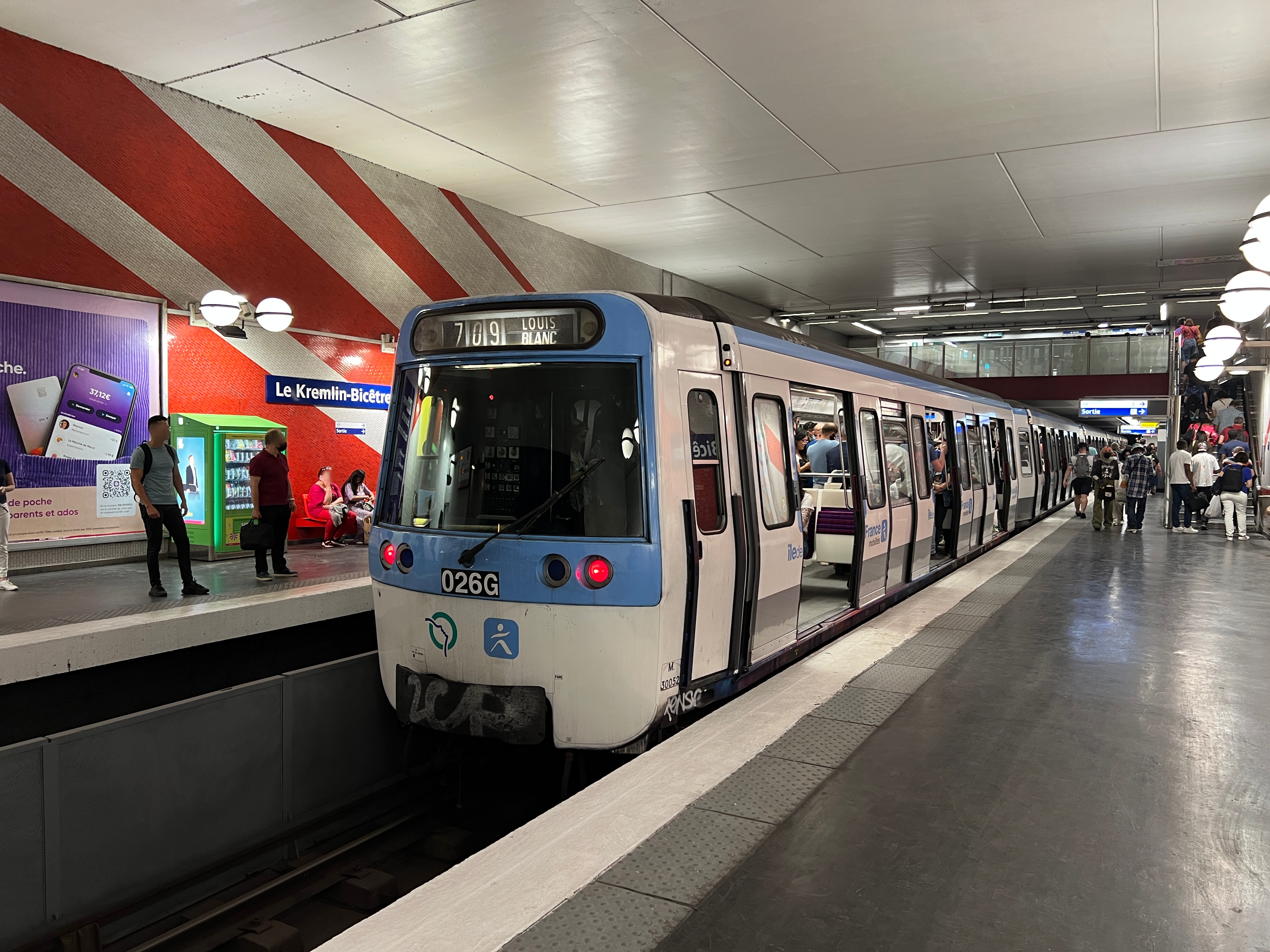
- MF 77 at Le Kremlin-Bicêtre

General information
- Location: Le Kremlin-Bicêtre; Île-de-France; France
- Coordinates: 48°48′37″N 2°21′43″E
- System: Paris Metro station
- Owner: RATP
- Operator: RATP
- Line: Paris Metro Paris Metro Line 7
- Platforms: 2 (2 side platforms)
- Tracks: 2

Other information
- Station code: 26-06
- Fare zone: 2

History
- Opened: 10 December 1982; 43 years ago

Passengers
- 2,244,686 (2020)

Services
Preceding station	Paris Metro	Following station
Villejuif–Léo Lagrange towards Villejuif–Louis Aragon	Line 7 Villejuif branch	Maison Blanche towards La Courneuve–8 mai 1945
Location
- Location within Paris

Le Kremlin–Bicêtre (French pronunciation: [lə kʁɛmlɛ̃ bisɛːtʁ]) is a station of the Paris Metro, serving the Villejuif branch of Line 7.

== History ==
Le Kremlin–Bicêtre opened on 10 December 1982 following an extension of Line 7 from Maison Blanche and served as the southern terminus of the new branch until 28 February 1985, when the branch was extended further to Villejuif Louis Aragon.

This station's distinctive name comes from the name of the commune in which it is located. The first part was derived from Au sergent du Kremlin, a local tavern opened in 1813 following the French occupation of Moscow, frequented by war veterans due to its proximity to Bicêtre Hospital; Bicêtre is an alternate name for Winchester in French, referencing a medieval Bishop of Winchester who had owned property in the area.

In 2019, the station was used by 4,062,243 passengers, making it the 112th busiest in the Metro network out of 302 stations.

In 2020, the station was used by 2,244,686 passengers amidst the COVID-19 pandemic, making it the 103rd busiest in the Metro network out of 305 stations.

== Passenger services ==
=== Access ===
The station has 2 entrances:

- Entrance 1: Avenue de Fontainebleau / Avenue Eugène Thomas Hôpital de Bicêtre
- Entrance 2: Avenue de Fontainebleau

=== Station layout ===
Street Level
B1	Mezzanine
Line 7 platforms	Side platform, doors will open on the right
Line 7 platforms	Southbound	← toward Villejuif–Louis Aragon (Villejuif–Léo Lagrange)
Line 7 platforms	Northbound	toward La Courneuve–8 mai 1945 (Maison Blanche) →
Line 7 platforms	Side platform, doors will open on the right

=== Platforms ===
Le Kremlin–Bicêtre has a standard configuration, with two side platforms separated by two tracks and surmounted by a mezzanine. The name of the station is written in Parisine font on enamelled plates. Lighting is provided by suspended luminous globes. Small ceramic tiles of a white and red colour, placed vertically, cover the walls as well as the tunnel exits. The furniture is in the Motte style in a red colour.

=== Other connections ===
The station is alo served by lines 47, 131, 185, and 323 of the RATP bus network, by line v7 of the Valouette bus network, and at night, by lines N15 and N22 of the Noctilien bus network.

== Nearby ==
- Centre commercial Okabé
- Cimetière du Kremlin-Bicêtre
- Hôpital Bicêtre

== Gallery ==
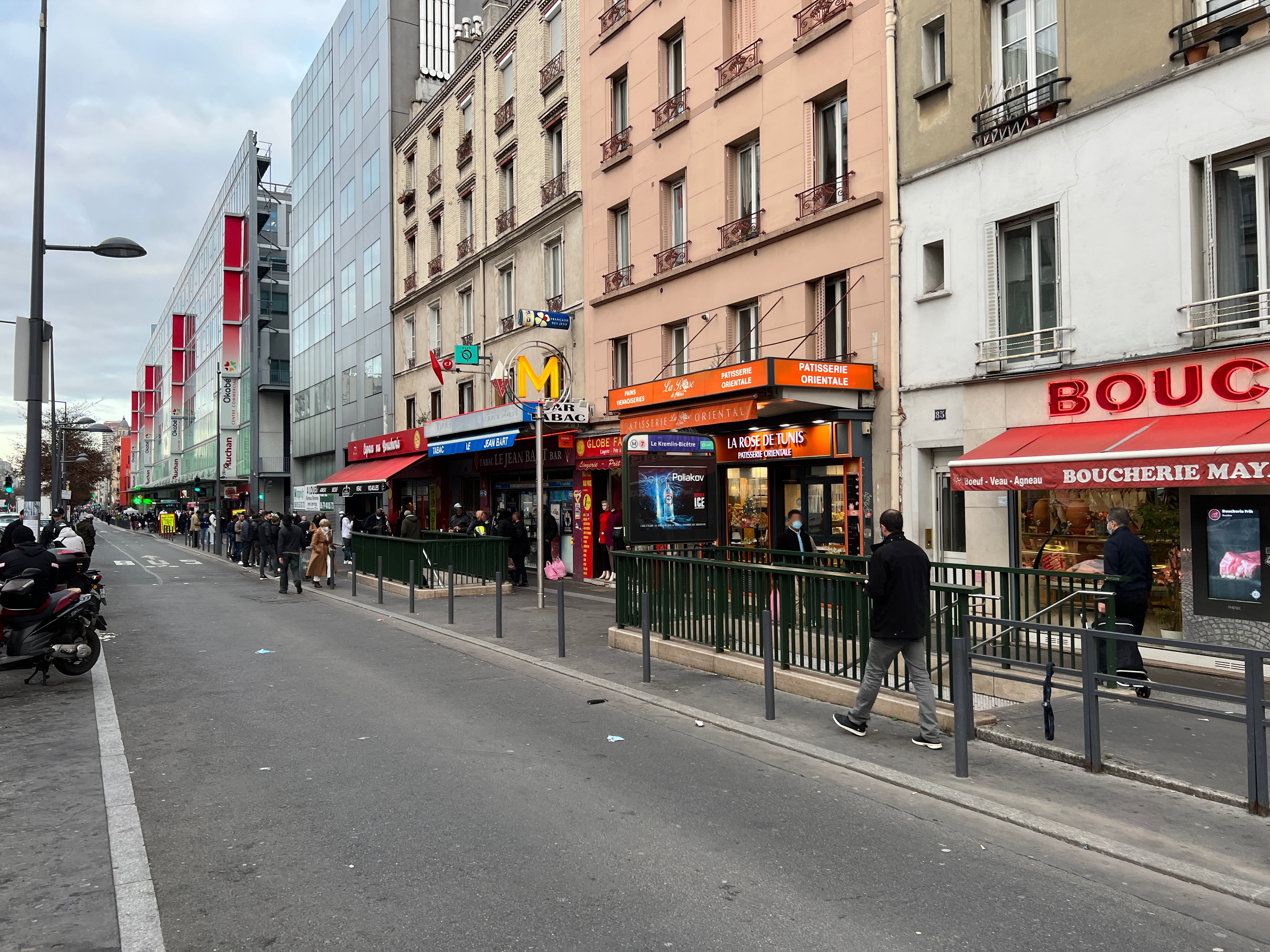
Entrance along avenue Fontainebleau
