= Paris Metro Line 7 =

Subway route in the French capital

Line 7
- Paris Metro Line 7
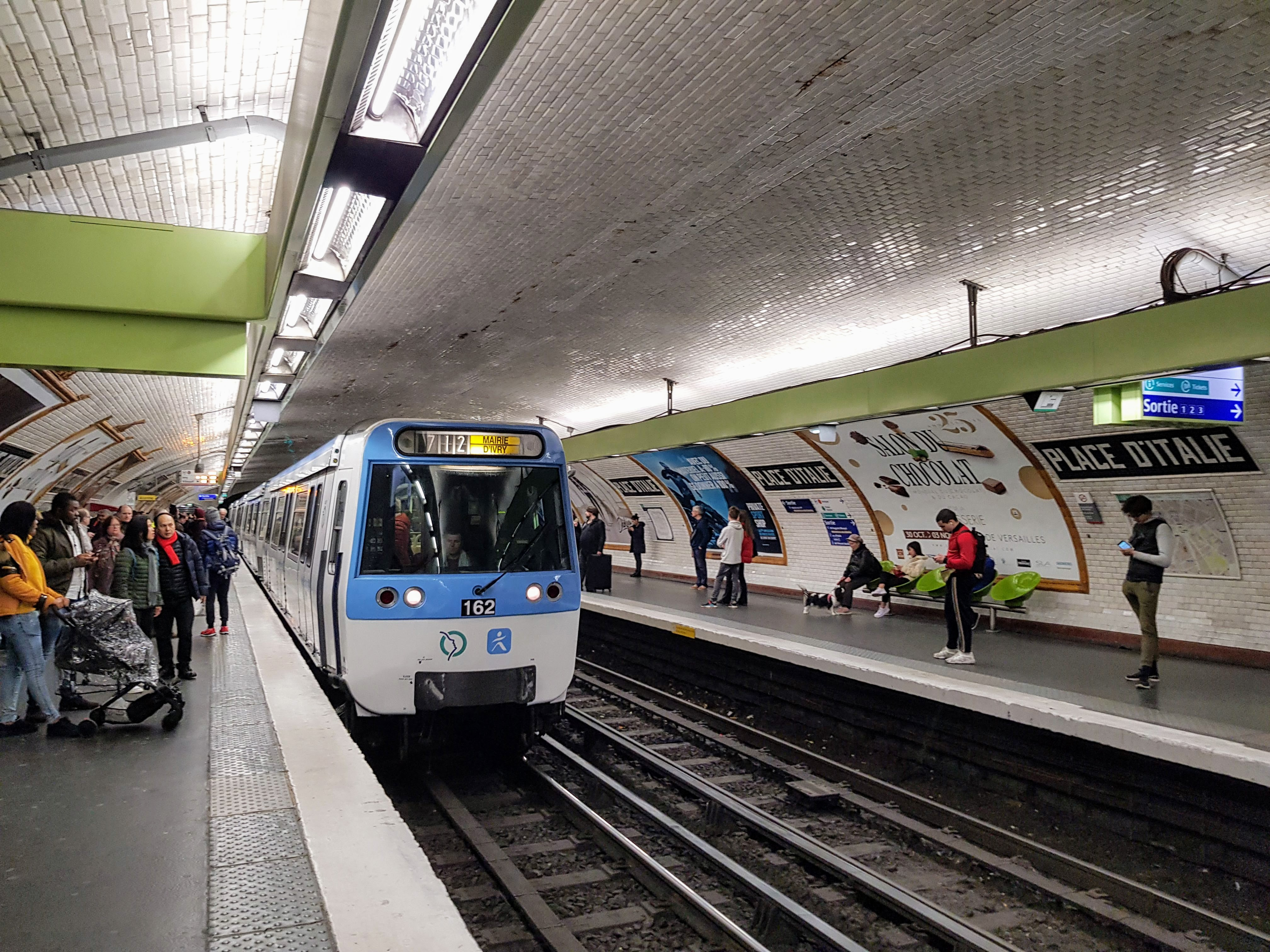
- A refurbished MF 77 at Place d'Italie

Overview
- Termini: La Courneuve–8 mai 1945; Mairie d'Ivry or Villejuif–Louis Aragon
- Connecting lines: Paris Metro Paris Metro Line 1 Paris Metro Line 2 Paris Metro Line 3 Paris Metro Line 4 Paris Metro Line 5 Paris Metro Line 6 Paris Metro Line 7bis Paris Metro Line 8 Paris Metro Line 9 Paris Metro Line 10 Paris Metro Line 11 Paris Metro Line 14 RER RER A RER B RER D Transilien Transilien Line P (Paris-Est) Tramways in Île-de-France Île-de-France tramway Line 1 Île-de-France tramway Line 3a Île-de-France tramway Line 3b Île-de-France tramway Line 7 Île-de-France tramway Line 9
- Stations: 38

Service
- System: Paris Métro
- Operator: RATP
- Rolling stock: MF 77 (69 trains as of 14 November 2026)
- Ridership: 119 million (avg. per year); 5th/16th

History
- Opened: 5 November 1910; 116 years ago

Technical
- Line length: 22.4 km (13.9 mi)
- Track gauge: 1,435 mm (4 ft 8 1/2 in) standard gauge
- Electrification: 750 V DC third rail

Paris Metro Line 7 is one of sixteen currently open lines of the Paris Métro system, which links La Courneuve–8 mai 1945 in Seine-Saint-Denis northeast of Paris, with Mairie d'Ivry southeast and Villejuif–Louis Aragon in the south, while passing through important parts of central Paris on a northeast to diagonal to south route.

Line 7 began operating in 1910 and, along with Line 13, is one of the only two Métro lines currently into branched operation. Line 3 also was meant to branch at Gambetta, but this was cancelled in favor of a branch becoming line 3bis. Line 7 did originally split north, at Louis Blanc, but a notable difference in usage between the two branches (due to Porte de la Vilette being a large bus hub serving the neighbouring Seine-Saint-Denis department) had the branch heading to Place du Danube separated in 1967 to become Line 7bis. In 1982, a new branch was added in the southeast of Maison Blanche and heading towards Villejuif. Line 7 has only steel rails.

At 18.6 km (12 mi), Line 7 is one of the longest in the Paris Métro network. In addition, it contains the most stations as well as being the fourth most-used line of the Paris Métro, with 135.1 million riders in 2017.

== History ==
=== Chronology ===
- 5 November 1910: Line 7 was opened linking Opéra to Porte de la Villette.
- 18 January 1911: A new branch was opened from Louis Blanc to Pré-Saint-Gervais.
- 1 July 1916: The line was extended in the south from Opéra to Palais Royal.
- 16 April 1926: The line was extended from Palais Royal to Pont Marie.
- 15 February 1930: While a tunnel was being built on line 7 to cross the Seine, a new section between Place Monge and Place d'Italie was opened and temporarily operated as part of Line 10.
- 3 June 1930: The line was extended from Pont Marie to Pont de Sully (now Sully-Morland).
- 7 March 1930: That section temporarily operating as part of Line 10 was extended from Place d'Italie to Porte de Choisy.
- 26 April 1931: The section between Pont de Sully and Place Monge was opened. The section between Place Monge and Porte de Choisy was transferred to Line 7 and it was extended to Porte d'Ivry simultaneously.
- 1 May 1946: The line was extended from Porte d'Ivry to Mairie d'Ivry.
- 3 December 1967: Because of a large traffic gap, the northeastern branch of the line 7 between Louis Blanc and Pré-Saint-Gervais became a new independent line known as Line 7bis.
- 3 October 1979: Arrival of the MF 77 train, then dubbed Le Métro blanc ("the white metro" [train]) on the line.
- 4 October 1979: The line was extended to the north from Porte de la Villette to Fort d'Aubervilliers.
- 10 December 1982: A new branch was opened to the south from Maison Blanche to Le Kremlin-Bicêtre.
- 28 February 1985 : The line was extended from Le Kremlin-Bicêtre to Villejuif Louis Aragon.
- 6 May 1987: The line was extended from Fort d'Aubervilliers to La Courneuve – 8 mai 1945.
- 11 December 2018: The first refurbished MF 77 train enters revenue service, sporting a white and blue livery reminiscent of its original RATP livery..
- October 2022: The communist mayor of Villejuif proposes the split of the Villejuif branch and its junction to Métro Line 5, currently terminating at Place d'Italie. The line 6's infrastructure, to which Line 5 is intertwined at its southern terminus, makes this operation highly complicated, and no further studies are currently on the desk.
- February 2024 : IDFM announces the rolling stock cascading from MF 77 to the brand new MF 19 on line 7 for 2033, so 8 years after line 10 on which the brand new steel-wheeled Paris Métro train's first unit is currently on test run mode. Line 7 is set to be the last one to receive the brand new train and thus to run the then fifty-five years old MF 77 train.

=== Future ===
- An extension of Line 7 north, from La Courneuve–8 mai 1945 to Le Bourget train station then Mairie de Drancy may be considered in the future for connection with the Grand Paris Express (Métro lines 16 and 17), RER line B and Tram line 11. The first part of this extension is set after the opening of a new workshop beyond La Courneuve, but the second half isn't expected until 2040 despite being backed by the department.
- Line 7bis, the original northeastern branch of Line 7, may be merged with Line 3bis – its counterpart from line 3 – to form a new line, with its western terminus at Château-Landon on Line 7.

== Route and stations ==
Geographically accurate diagram of Paris metro line 7

=== Route ===
Line 7 runs for 18.6 km (12 mi) completely underground, stopping at 38 stations. Southbound trains terminate alternately at Villejuif – Louis Aragon and Mairie d'Ivry, diverging at Maison Blanche. Late at night, through trains only operate to Mairie d'Ivry; a shuttle train from Maison Blanche ensures the traffic to Villejuif.

In the north, the line begins at La Courneuve in the department of Seine-Saint-Denis at the intersection of National Routes 2 and 186. La Courneuve station acts as a transfer between the Métro and Paris' fragmented, suburban tramway system, with a station on Paris Tramway Line 1 (T1). Unlike most stations in Paris, there are three tracks, with the central one used for departures and arrivals.

Running below National Route 2 (RN2), the line heads to the south-west, entering Paris in two single-line tunnels so as to avoid a now-unused terminal loop at Porte de la Villette. It then descends a 4% grade below Canal Saint-Denis and then climbs back up to stop at Corentin Cariou. Line 7 furthers then down along the Canal de l'Ourcq and reaches Stalingrad, a transfer point with Lines 2 and 5, where the line turns to engage below Rue du Faubourg Saint-Martin before splitting in two stations at Louis Blanc, where the original fork was located. Line 7 then carries on below the Rue du Faubourg Saint-Martin before turning west to reaching Gare de l'Est, an important train station connecting to the East of France and Europe, at a hub station shared with Line 5 which comes through east. Line 7 thencarries on westbound to the Rue Lafayette, at the Poissonière station. Next three stations (Cadet, Le Pèletier and Chaussée d'Antin) are also under said axis. Line then diverges south at the origin of Rue Lafayette, to reach its initial origin : the Place de l'Opéra (lines 3 & 8, as well as RER line A at Auber station).

Line 7 then turns southeast under the eponymous street and calls two more stops, Pyramides (line 14) and Palais Royal (line 1), before engaging in a sinuous curve set towards the Seine carefully avoiding the foundations of both the Louvre and Saint-Germain l'Auxerrois, before reaching Pont Neuf station and its service track, then heading straight to Châtelet (formerly called Pont Notre-Dame and far enough from lines 1 and 4's respective stations to not be transferable) then to Pont Marie, then to Sully-Morland, all along the Docks of the Seine. Line 7 then finally curves south to cross the Parisian river, under the former Halle aux Vins and now university of Jussieu.

After a specific curve meant to reach Place Monge without endangering the former Roman Arenas of Lutetia, line 7 catches the Montparnasse – Austerlitz axis at les Gobelins, before heading south to Place d'Italie, terminus of line 5 and crossing with line 6, the southern part of Paris Métro's inner rocade. Line 7 dives beneath the two, which are located at the same level and were several times merged together throughout the 20th century.

Line 7 then heads back a bit up south to call the Tolbiac station, before diving back down at Maison Blanche, where the pink line splits into its two current branches right beneath the former Petite Ceinture.

The Ivry branch sticks at level and turns east to call at the Porte d'Italie station and its suburban bus hub, then follows the city's Boulevard des Maréchaux for two more stops : Porte de Choisy (Tramway line 9) and Porte d'Ivry, the line's former southern terminus with its three tracks and large workshops. Line 7 then casually exits Paris and enters Ivry-sur-Seine, reaching the Pierre et Marie Curie station right at the exit of the former back stops, then enters a 36,75‰ curve up to reach Mairie d'Ivry, the line's southern termini.

The Villejuif branch splits and dives from the Ivry branch, then sprints along the Choisy workshops out of Paris into le Kremlin-Bicêtre with one stop, then Villejuif with three including the terminus, all under the Nationale 7.

=== Renamed stations ===
Date	Old name	New name
1 November 1926	Pont Notre-Dame	Pont Notre-Dame – Pont au Change
15 April 1934	Pont Notre-Dame – Pont au Change	Châtelet
6 October 1942	Boulevard de la Villette	Aubervilliers – Boulevard de la Villette
10 February 1946	Pont de Flandre	Corentin Cariou
10 February 1946	Aubervilliers – Boulevard de la Villette	Stalingrad
1989	Chaussée d'Antin	Chaussée d'Antin – La Fayette
8 March 2007	Pierre Curie	Pierre et Marie Curie

=== Specifically themed stations ===
Seven stations on line 7 feature specific themeing :

- La Courneuve – 8 Mai 1945 features two upper walls ornated with frescoes, featuring birds and a rising sun.
- Cadet features an overall fresco showcasing the American Flag.
- Chaussée d'Antin – La Fayette features a stationwide fresco on its vault made during the bicentennial of the French revolution. and showcasing the Marquis of La Fayette pointing towards the new world, represented as a child.
- Palais Royal – Musée du Louvre features an exclusive Guimard-style entrypoint at street level, called Le Kiosque des noctambules and erected during the centennial of the Paris Métro.
- Pont Neuf features several large-scale reproduction of coinage (hence the station's subtitle La Monnaie) spanning from one dock to the other across the station's vault, along with an old money minter and two panels showcasing real coins.
- Châtelet - Pont au Change has its eastern side located in a 17th century vault erected at the request of King Louis XIII to the Marquis de Gesvres, whose name became the name of the street above.
- Villejuif – Léo Lagrange features a sports theming since the centennial of the Métro, featuring facts and records of the greatest worldwide athletes through the docks.

== Tourism ==
Metro Line 7 passes near several places of interest :

- The Parc de la Villette with the Cité des Sciences et de l'Industrie (Porte de la Villette)
- The Canal Saint Martin (Stalingrad).
- The Gare de l'Est (Gare de l'Est)
- The Opera Garnier. (Opéra)
- The Louvre Museum (Palais Royal – Musée du Louvre)
- The Latin Quarter. (Jussieu and Place Monge)
- The Institut du Monde Arabe (Jussieu)
- The Jardin des Plantes and its ménagerie (Jussieu)
- The Arenes de Lutèce (Place Monge)
- The Place de la Contrescarpe (Place Monge)
- The Rue Mouffetard (Place Monge and Censier – Daubenton)
- Place d'Italie and the Butte aux Cailles district (Place d'Italie).
- One of Paris' "Chinatowns" in the south of the 13th arrondissement (Porte de Choisy).

== Rolling Stock ==
Line 7 currently uses 69 MF 77 trains, which run on the system’s longest lines. Most of these trains were refurbished between 2019 and 2022 adding a reddish interior and a new white and blue livery coined by IDFM, reminiscent of the former blue and white livery that preceded the white and jade green RATP livery, which is also seen on the MP 14 and the future MF 19, MR3V/MR6V and MRV trains. The MF 77 trains are set to be replaced by the brand new MF 19 trains from 2027 (on line 13) to 2033 on line 7, which will be the last line to run trains equipped with DC motors and without open gangways.

== See also ==
- Paris
- List of Paris Métro stations
- List of metro systems
- Rail transport in France
