= Villejuif–Louis Aragon station =

Metro station in Paris, France

Villejuif–Louis Aragon
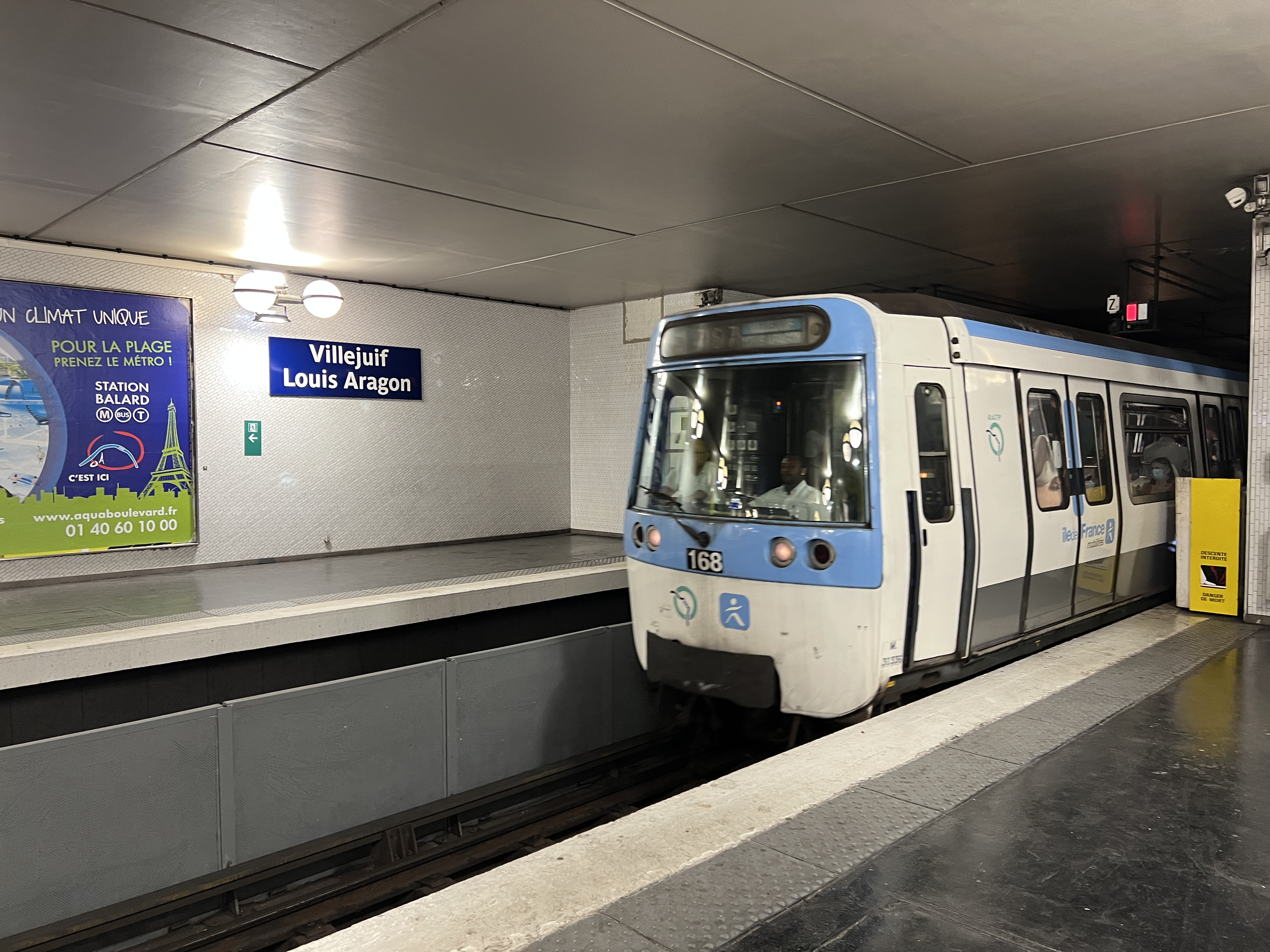
- Platforms at Villejuif-Louis Aragon

General information
- Location: 175 Boulevard Maxime Gorky; Villejuif; France
- Coordinates: 48°47′14″N 2°22′03″E
- Operator: RATP Group and ORA (RATP Dev, Alstom & ComfortDelGro)
- Platforms: Line 7: 2 side platforms; Line 15: 2 side platforms
- Tracks: Line 7: 2; Line 15: 2

Construction
- Depth: Line 15: 42 m (138 ft)
- Accessible: Yes
- Architect: Line 15: Philippe Gazeau

Other information
- Station code: 26-09
- Fare zone: 3

History
- Opened: 28 February 1985; 41 years ago

Services
Preceding station	Paris Metro	Following station
Terminus	Line 7 Villejuif branch	Villejuif–Paul Vaillant-Couturier towards La Courneuve–8 mai 1945

Other services
Preceding station	Paris Metro	Following station
Villejuif–Gustave Roussy towards Pont de Sèvres	Line 15 (autumn 2027)	Mairie de Vitry-sur-Seine towards Noisy–Champs
Location
- Location within Paris and inner ring

Villejuif–Louis Aragon station (French pronunciation: [vilʒɥif lwi aʁaɡɔ̃]) is a station of the Paris Metro, located in the commune of Villejuif.

== History ==
The station opened on 28 February 1985 when Line 7 was extended from Le Kremlin–Bicêtre and serves the commune of Villejuif as the southwestern terminus of one of Paris Metro Line 7's branches (the terminus on the other branch is Mairie d'Ivry).

The station is named after the Avenue Louis Aragon and Louis Aragon (1897–1982), a French writer.

Early plans to extend line 14 from Olympiades to Orly Airport included the possibility of taking over the existing line 7 branch from Maison Blanche to this station. However, the inclusion of line 14 in the Grand Paris Express project means that the line 14 extension to Orly will only consist of new infrastructure and the plan has been shelved. Line 15 (another Grand Paris Express line) will serve this station from autumn 2027 onwards (as of June 2026), three years later than originally intended in 2024, with construction having started in 2017.

In 2020, the station was used by 4,029,467 passengers amidst the COVID-19 pandemic, making it the 28th busiest of the Metro network, out of 305 stations.

== Passenger services ==
=== Access ===
- Access 1: Avenue de Stalingrad – with an elevator leading to a connection with the T7 tram.
- Access 2: Boulevard Maxime Gorki – equipped with an elevator and a fixed staircase indicated by a mast with the yellow M logo.
- Access 3: Avenue Louis Aragon – with a fixed staircase.
- Access 4: Gare routière – with two fixed stairs, one of which is indicated by a mast with the yellow M logo.

=== Platforms ===
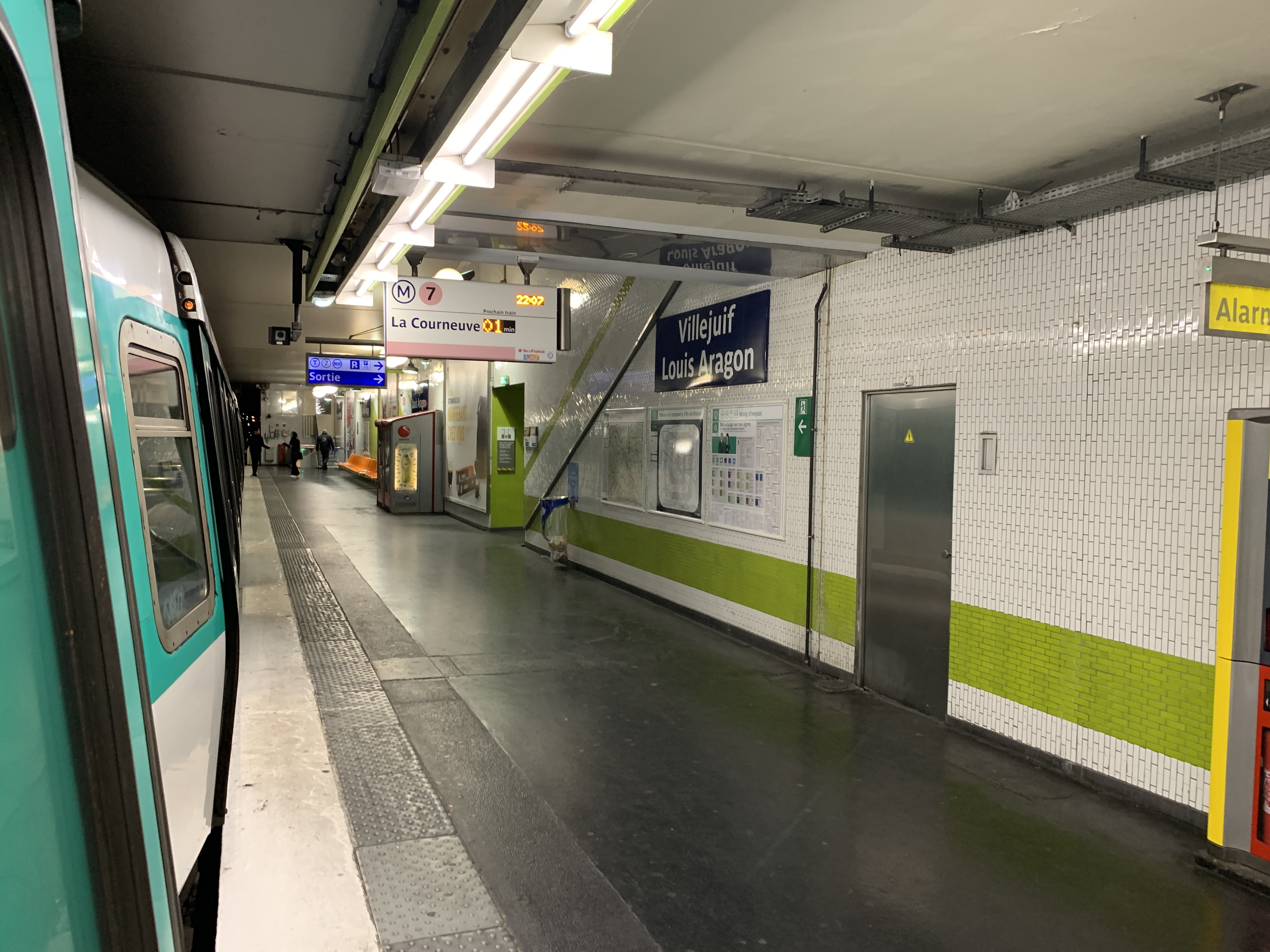
MF 77 at the platform towards La Courneuve–8 mai 1945

Villejuif–Louis Aragon is a standard configuration station: it has two side platforms separated by the metro tracks, surmounted by a mezzanine. The name of the station is written on enamelled plates. Lighting is provided by suspended luminous globes and neon lights on the mezzanine level. Small ceramic tiles of white and green colour placed vertically cover the walls and tunnel exits. The furniture is the Motte style, in orange.

=== Other connections ===
Since 16 November 2013, it has served as the northern terminus of tram line T7.

The station is served by lines 162, 172, 180, 185, 286, and 380 of the RATP bus network, by line v7 of the Valouette bus network and, at night, by lines N15 and N22 of the Noctilien bus network.

== Gallery ==
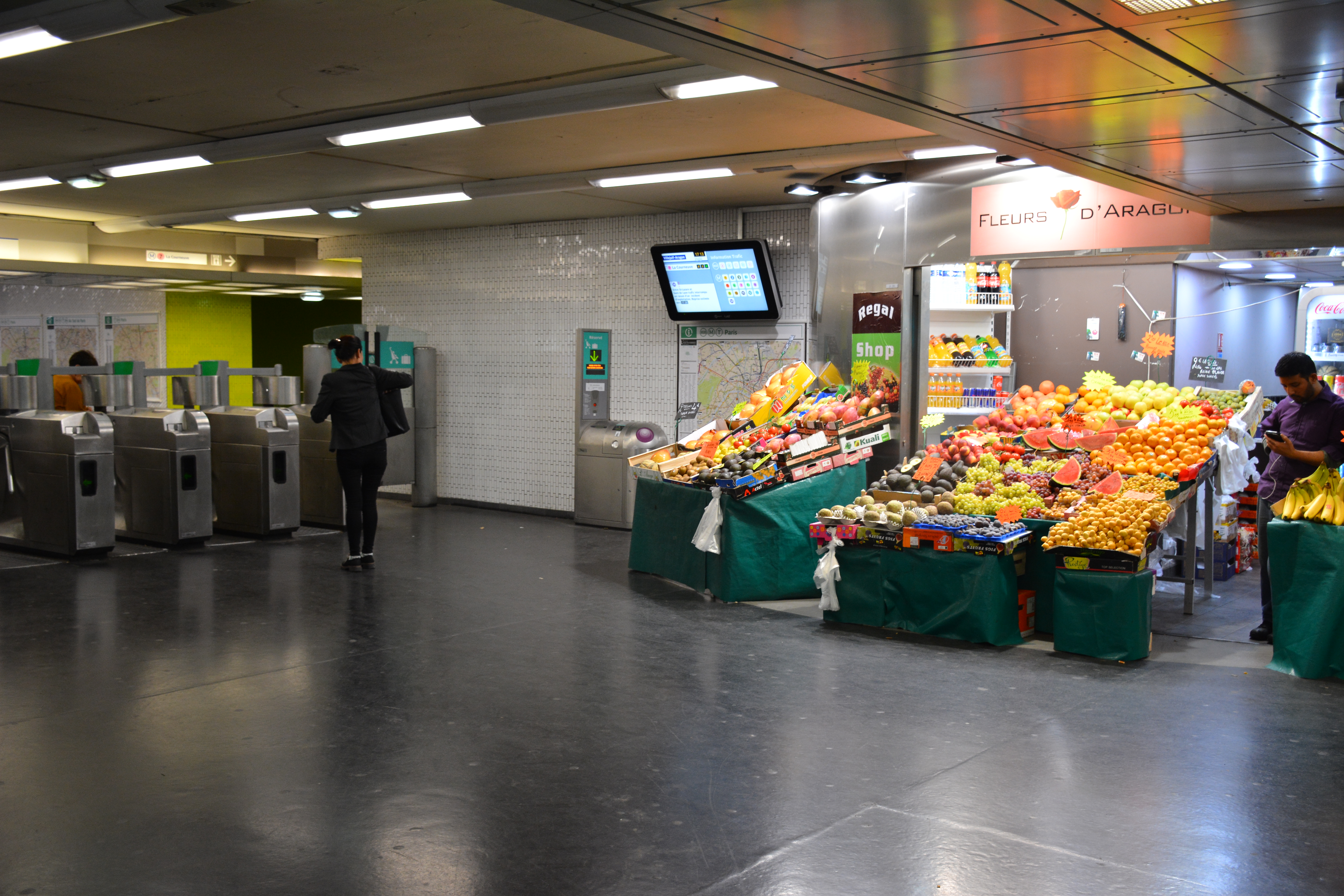
Mezzanine level

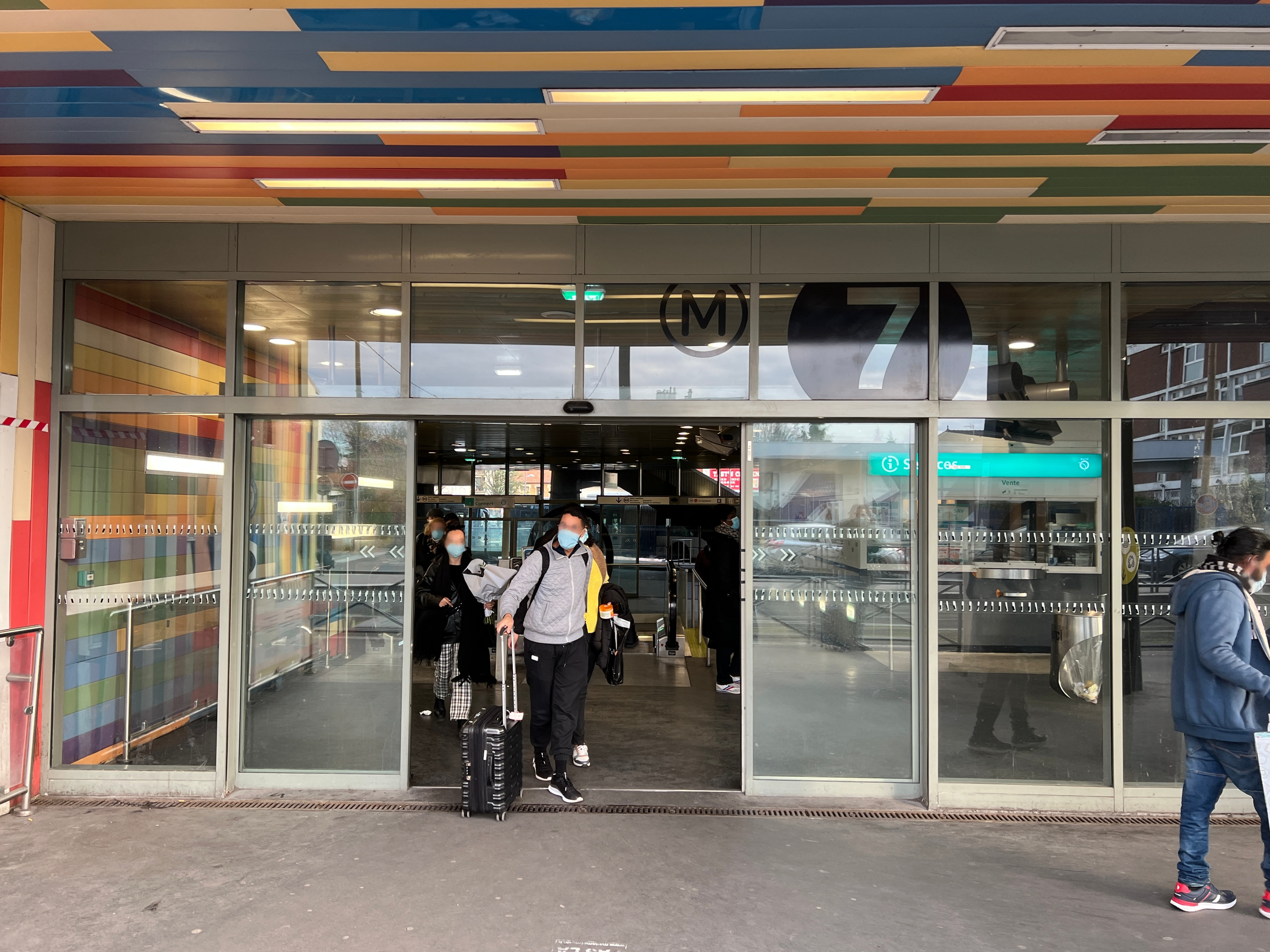
Entrance at Avenue de Stalingrad

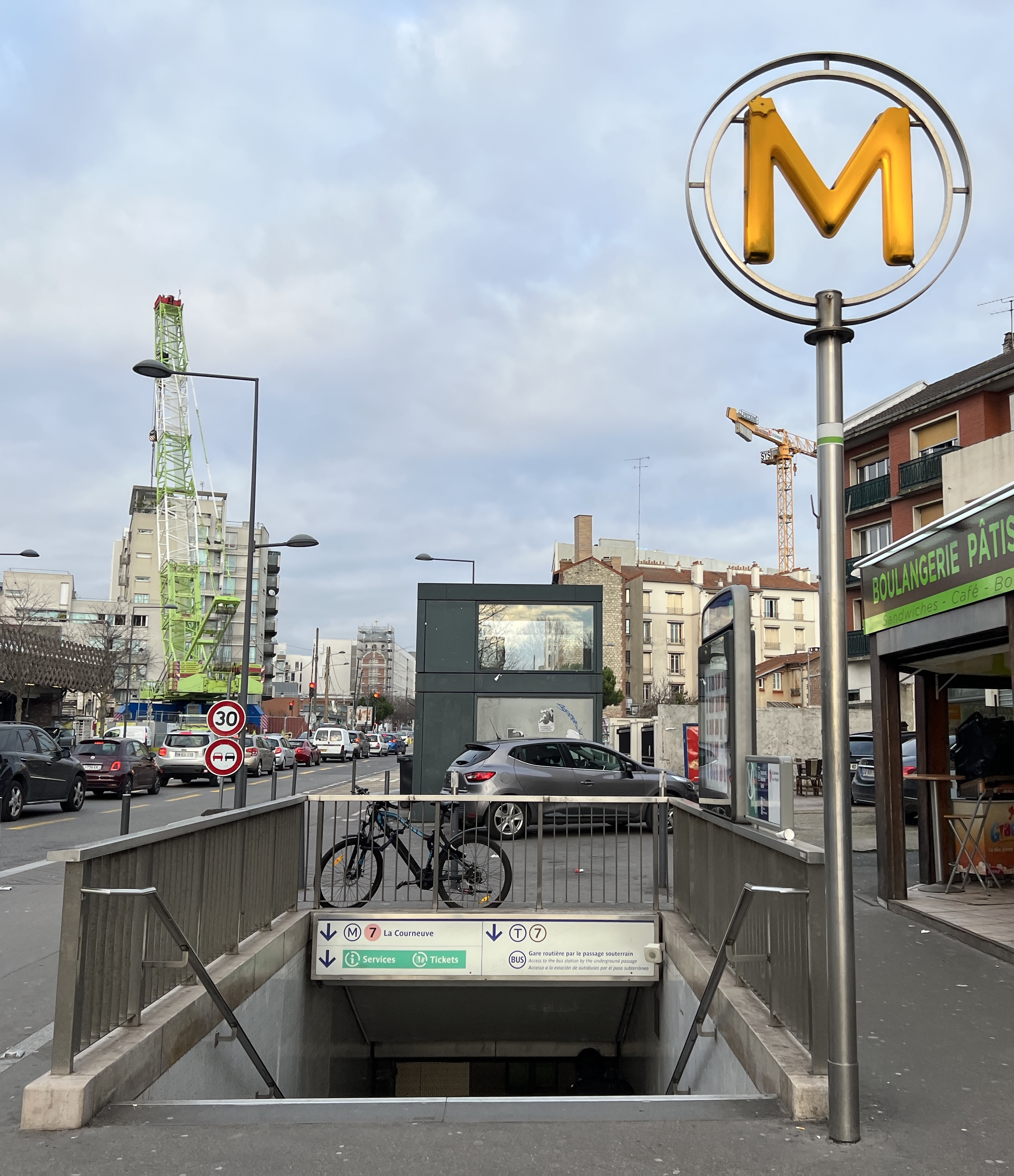
Entrance at Boulevard Maxime Gorki

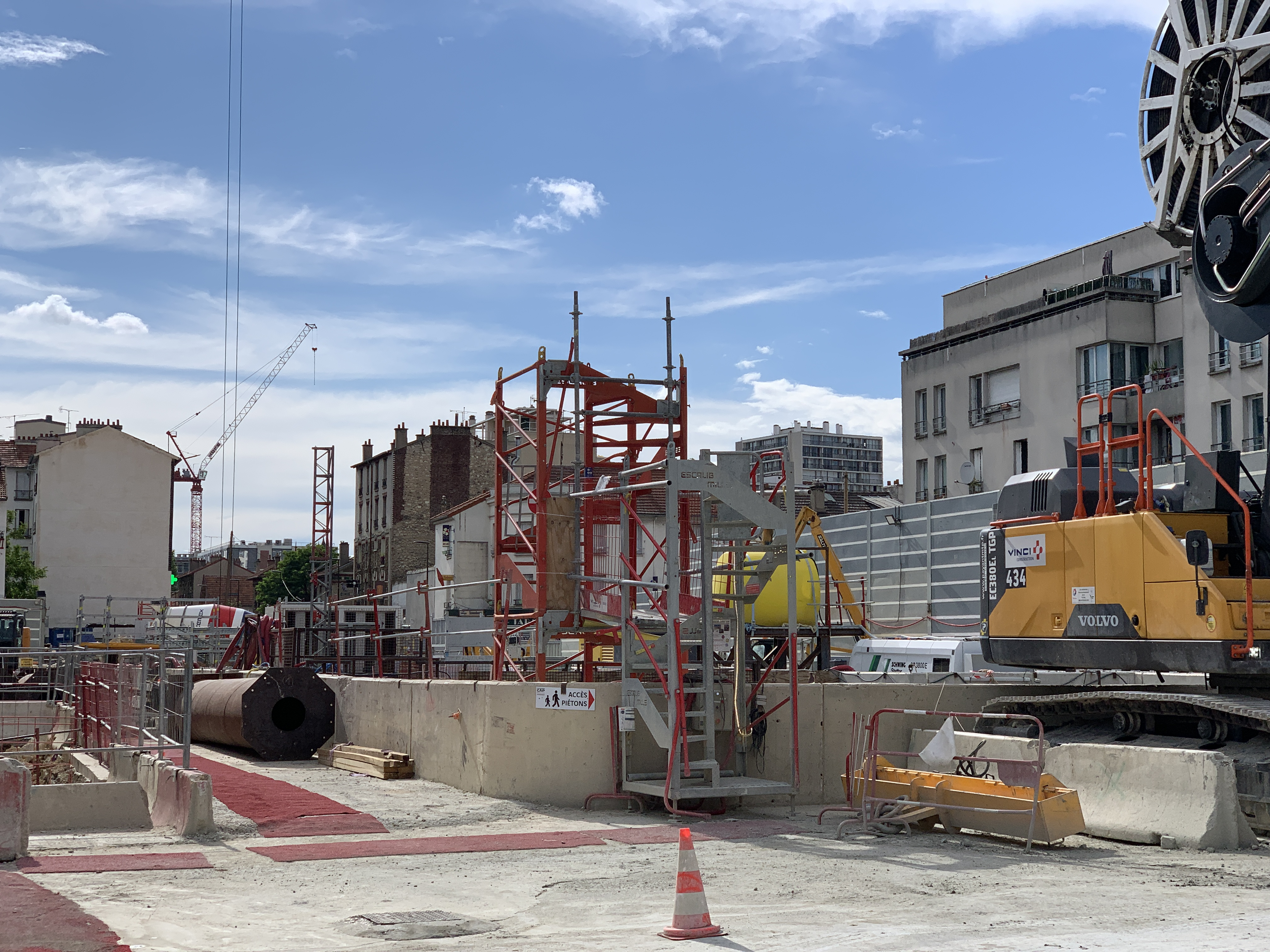
Construction of line 15's station at Villejuif–Louis Aragon

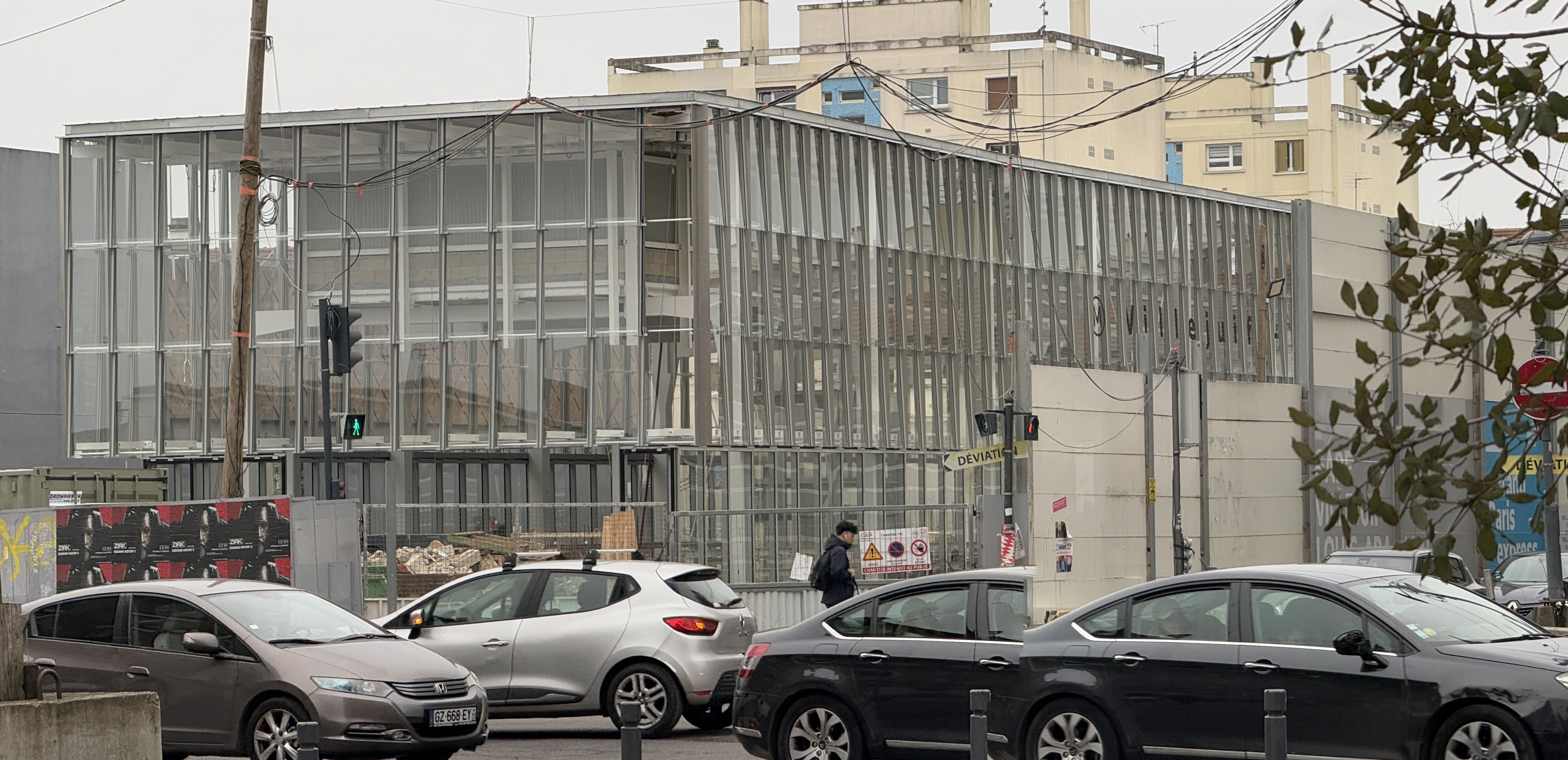
Line 15 building in 2025

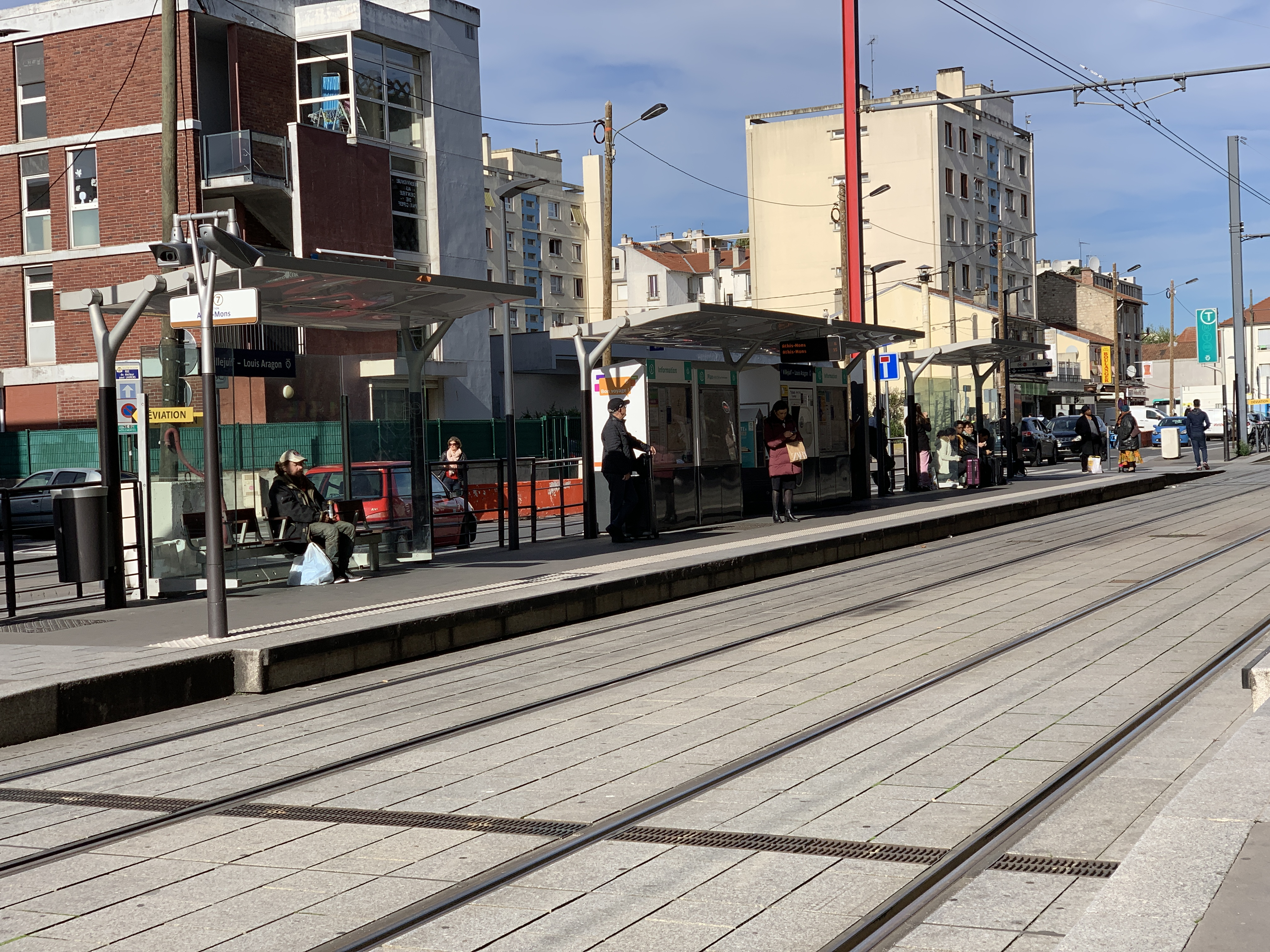
T7 platforms
