= List of Paris Metro stations =

Metro, RER and Tramway network mapped to a geographically accurate scale (2011)

The following is a list of all stations of the Paris Metro. As of the end of January 2025, there are a total of 321 stations on 16 different lines.

== Introductory notes ==
- Stations are often named after a square or a street, which, in turn, is named for something or someone else.
- A number of stations, such as Avron or Vaugirard, are named after Paris neighbourhoods (though not necessarily located in them), whose names, in turn, usually go back to former villages or hamlets that have long since been incorporated into the city of Paris.
- The use of double names, such as Reuilly–Diderot or Strasbourg–Saint-Denis, often goes back to two (or more) stations on separate lines that were originally named independently and became associated as interchange stations. Notably, Marcadet–Poissonniers is an interchange station consisting of the original Marcadet on Line 4 and the original Poissonniers on Line 12. In many instances, however, the practice of double naming was extended to other stations, usually because these stations are located at the intersection of streets carrying these names. Examples include Alma–Marceau and Faidherbe–Chaligny.
- Many stations have been renamed during the last century. There have been periods of history during which a significant number of stations were renamed. For example, once Germany declared war on France in 1914, it was decided to rename Berlin as Liège and Allemagne (French for "Germany") as Jaurès. The period during which the most stations were renamed was the post-World War II period; Marbeuf at the centre of the Champs-Élysées was renamed Franklin D. Roosevelt in 1946 and Aubervilliers-Villette was renamed Stalingrad the same year.

== Stations ==
Station	Line(s)	Opening date	Placement	Town	Passengers	Interchange	Notes (former names)	Image
Abbesses (Butte Montmartre)	Paris Metro Line 12	1912-10-31	underground	Paris 18th	1,513,884	Montmartre Funicular		Abbesses
Aéroport d'Orly (Paray-Vieille-Poste)	Paris Metro Line 14	2024-06-24	underground	Paray-Vieille-Poste	/	(Orly 1, 2, 3)		Aéroport d'Orly
Aimé Césaire (Aubervilliers)	Paris Metro Line 12	2022-05-31	underground	Aubervilliers	/			Aimé Césaire
Alésia	Paris Metro Line 4	1909-10-30	underground	Paris 14th	3,098,136			Alésia
Alexandre Dumas	Paris Metro Line 2	1903-01-31	underground	Paris 11th, Paris 20th	2,476,608		(until 1970: Bagnolet)	Alexandre Dumas
Alma–Marceau	Paris Metro Line 9	1923-05-27	underground	Paris 8th, Paris 16th	2,564,842	(Pont de l'Alma)		Alma–Marceau
Anatole France	Paris Metro Line 3	1937-09-24	underground	Levallois-Perret	2,311,825		platforms offset	Anatole France
Anvers (Sacré-Cœur)	Paris Metro Line 2	1902-10-07	underground	Paris 9th, Paris 18th	3,420,749	Montmartre Funicular		Anvers
Argentine	Paris Metro Line 1	1900-09-01	underground	Paris 16th, Paris 17th	2,079,212		(until 1948: Obligado)	Argentine
Arts et Métiers	Paris Metro Line 3 Paris Metro Line 11	: 1904-10-19 : 1935-08-28	underground	Paris 3rd	2,403,042			Arts et Métiers
Assemblée Nationale	Paris Metro Line 12	1910-11-05	underground	Paris 7th	611,512		(until 1989: Chambre des Députés)	Assemblée Nationale
Aubervilliers–Pantin–Quatre Chemins	Paris Metro Line 7	1979-10-04	underground	Aubervilliers	5,616,435			Aubervilliers–Pantin–Quatre Chemins
Avenue Émile Zola	Paris Metro Line 10	1913-07-13	underground	Paris 15th	1,041,233		(until 1937: Commerce) line 8 from opening until 1937	Avenue Émile Zola
Avron	Paris Metro Line 2	1903-04-02	underground	Paris 11th, Paris 20th	1,345,521			Avron
Bagneux–Lucie Aubrac	Paris Metro Line 4	2022-01-13	underground	Bagneux	/			Bagneux–Lucie Aubrac
Balard	Paris Metro Line 8	1937-07-27	underground	Paris 15th	3,236,801	(Suzanne Lenglen)		Balard
Barbara (Montrouge)	Paris Metro Line 4	2022-01-13	underground	Montrouge, Bagneux	/			Barbara
Barbès–Rochechouart	Paris Metro Line 2 Paris Metro Line 4	: 1903-03-26 : 1908-04-21	: elevated : undergr.	Paris 9th, Paris 10th, Paris 18th	5,390,939		(until 1907: Boulevard Barbès)	Barbès–Rochechouart
Basilique de Saint-Denis (Hôtel de Ville)	Paris Metro Line 13	1976-06-20	underground	Saint-Denis	3,991,395	(Marché de Saint-Denis)	(until 1998: Saint-Denis–Basilique)	Basilique de Saint-Denis
Bastille	Paris Metro Line 1 Paris Metro Line 5 Paris Metro Line 8	: 1900-07-19 : 1906-12-17 : 1931-05-05	: ground level : undergr.	Paris 4th, Paris 11th, Paris 12th	8,069,243			Bastille
Bel-Air	Paris Metro Line 6	1909-03-01	ground level	Paris 12th	1,605,573		closed from 1939 until 1963	Bel-Air
Belleville (Commune de Paris 1871)	Paris Metro Line 2 Paris Metro Line 11	: 1903-01-31 : 1935-04-28	underground	Paris 10th, Paris 11th, Paris 19th, Paris 20th	7,314,438			Belleville
Bérault	Paris Metro Line 1	1934-03-24	underground	Saint-Mandé, Vincennes	2,106,827			Bérault
Bercy	Paris Metro Line 6 Paris Metro Line 14	: 1909-03-01 : 1998-10-15	underground	Paris 12th	3,884,212	TER Bourgogne-Franche-Comté, Intercités (Gare de Paris Bercy)		Bercy
Bibliothèque François Mitterrand	Paris Metro Line 14	1998-10-15	underground	Paris 13th	11,104,474	(Avenue de France)		Bibliothèque François Mitterrand
Billancourt	Paris Metro Line 9	1934-02-03	underground	Boulogne-Billancourt	1,967,532			Billancourt
Bir-Hakeim (Tour Eiffel)	Paris Metro Line 6	1906-04-24	elevated	Paris 15th	3,362,908	(Champ de Mars–Tour Eiffel)	(until 1949: Grenelle) line 2 Sud from opening until 1907; line 5 from 1907 until 1942	Bir-Hakeim
Blanche	Paris Metro Line 2	1902-10-21	underground	Paris 9th, Paris 18th	2,167,570			Blanche
Bobigny–Pablo Picasso (Préfecture–Hôtel du Département)	Paris Metro Line 5	1985-04-25	underground	Bobigny	6,561,327	Tramways in Île-de-France Île-de-France tramway Line 1		Bobigny–Pablo Picasso
Bobigny–Pantin–Raymond Queneau	Paris Metro Line 5	1985-04-25	underground	Bobigny, Pantin	2,335,465			Bobigny–Pantin–Raymond Queneau
Boissière	Paris Metro Line 6	1900-10-02	underground	Paris 16th	1,224,181		branch of line 1 from opening until 1903; line 2 Sud from 1903 until 1907; line 5 from 1907 until 1942	Boissière
Bolivar	Paris Metro Line 7bis	1911-07-18	underground	Paris 19th	367,598		line 7 from opening until 1967	Bolivar
Bonne Nouvelle	Paris Metro Line 8 Paris Metro Line 9	: 1931-05-05 : 1933-12-10	underground	Paris 2nd, Paris 9th, Paris 10th	2,806,227			Bonne Nouvelle
Botzaris	Paris Metro Line 7bis	1911-01-18	underground	Paris 19th	669,323		line 7 from opening until 1967	Botzaris
Boucicaut	Paris Metro Line 8	1937-07-27	underground	Paris 15th	2,288,055			Boucicaut
Boulogne–Jean Jaurès	Paris Metro Line 10	1980-10-03	underground	Boulogne-Billancourt	2,700,354			Boulogne–Jean Jaurès
Boulogne–Pont de Saint-Cloud (Rhin et Danube)	Paris Metro Line 10	1981-10-02	underground	Boulogne-Billancourt	2,182,738	(Parc de Saint-Cloud)		Boulogne–Pont de Saint-Cloud
Bourse	Paris Metro Line 3	1904-10-19	underground	Paris 2nd	1,725,043			Bourse
Bréguet–Sabin	Paris Metro Line 5	1906-12-31	underground	Paris 11th	1,490,160			Bréguet–Sabin
Brochant	Paris Metro Line 13	1912-01-20	underground	Paris 17th	1,543,298			Brochant
Buttes Chaumont	Paris Metro Line 7bis	1912-02-13	underground	Paris 19th	358,301		line 7 from opening until 1967	Buttes Chaumont
Buzenval	Paris Metro Line 9	1933-12-10	underground	Paris 20th	1,448,855			Buzenval
Cadet	Paris Metro Line 7	1910-11-05	underground	Paris 9th	1,843,984			Cadet
Cambronne	Paris Metro Line 6	1906-04-24	elevated	Paris 15th	1,636,566		line 2 Sud from opening until 1907; line 5 from 1907 until 1942	Cambronne
Campo Formio	Paris Metro Line 5	1906-06-02	underground	Paris 13th	1,016,150			Campo Formio
Cardinal Lemoine	Paris Metro Line 10	1931-04-26	underground	Paris 5th	1,121,854			Cardinal Lemoine
Carrefour Pleyel	Paris Metro Line 13	1952-06-30	underground	Saint-Denis	1,535,528	(Saint-Denis–Pleyel)		Carrefour Pleyel
Censier–Daubenton	Paris Metro Line 7	1930-02-15	underground	Paris 5th	2,291,843		line 10 from opening until 1931	Censier–Daubenton
Champs-Élysées–Clemenceau (Grand Palais)	Paris Metro Line 1 Paris Metro Line 13	: 1900-07-19 : 1975-02-18	underground	Paris 8th	1,909,005		(until 1931: Champs-Élysées)	Champs-Élysées–Clemenceau
Chardon Lagache	Paris Metro Line 10	1913-09-30	underground	Paris 16th	482,053		platform only in direction Gare d'Austerlitz; line 8 from opening until 1937	Chardon Lagache
Charenton–Écoles (Place Aristide Briand)	Paris Metro Line 8	1942-10-05	underground	Charenton-le-Pont	2,164,023			Charenton–Écoles
Charles de Gaulle–Étoile	Paris Metro Line 1 Paris Metro Line 2 Paris Metro Line 6	: 1900-09-01 : 1900-12-13 : 1900-10-02	underground	Paris 8th, Paris 16th, Paris 17th	4,291,663	RER RER A	(until 1970: Étoile) : official terminus (on turning loop); branch of line 1 from opening until 1903; line 2 Sud from 1903 until 1907; line 5 from 1907 until 1942	Charles de Gaulle–Étoile
Charles Michels	Paris Metro Line 10	1913-07-13	underground	Paris 15th	3,079,569		(until 1945: Beaugrenelle) line 8 from opening until 1937	Charles Michels
Charonne (Place du 8 février 1962)	Paris Metro Line 9	1933-12-10	underground	Paris 11th	2,705,320			Charonne
Château d'Eau	Paris Metro Line 4	1908-04-21	underground	Paris 10th	2,687,103			Château d'Eau
Château de Vincennes	Paris Metro Line 1	1934-03-24	underground	Paris 12th, Vincennes	3,617,738	(Vincennes)		Château de Vincennes
Château-Landon	Paris Metro Line 7	1910-11-05	underground	Paris 10th	1,140,353	, TGV, TER Grand Est (Gare de l'Est)		Château-Landon
Château Rouge	Paris Metro Line 4	1908-04-21	underground	Paris 18th	5,841,122			Château Rouge
Châtelet ( Pont au Change)	Paris Metro Line 1 Paris Metro Line 4 Paris Metro Line 7 Paris Metro Line 11 Paris Metro Line 14	: 1900-08-06 : 1908-04-21 : 1926-04-16 : 1935-04-28 : 1998-10-15	underground	Paris 1st, Paris 4th	8,350,794	(Châtelet–Les Halles)	( until 1926: Pont Notre-Dame; from 1926 until 1934: Pont Notre-Dame–Pont au Change)	Châtelet
Châtillon–Montrouge	Paris Metro Line 13	1976-11-09	elevated	Châtillon, Montrouge	5,034,012	Tramways in Île-de-France Île-de-France tramway Line 6		Châtillon–Montrouge
Chaussée d'Antin–La Fayette	Paris Metro Line 7 Paris Metro Line 9	: 1910-11-05 : 1923-06-03	underground	Paris 9th	4,251,916			Chaussée d'Antin–La Fayette
Chemin Vert	Paris Metro Line 8	1931-05-05	underground	Paris 3rd, Paris 11th	1,018,958			Chemin Vert
Chevaleret	Paris Metro Line 6	1909-03-01	elevated	Paris 13th	2,748,696			Chevaleret
Chevilly-Larue (Marché International)	Paris Metro Line 14	2024-06-24	underground	Chevilly-Larue	/	Tvm		Chevilly-Larue
Cité	Paris Metro Line 4	1910-01-09	underground	Paris 4th	1,004,657			Cité
Cluny–La Sorbonne	Paris Metro Line 10	1930-02-15	underground	Paris 5th	1,261,818	(Saint-Michel–Notre-Dame)	(until 1988: Cluny) closed from 1939 until 1988	Cluny–La Sorbonne
Colonel Fabien	Paris Metro Line 2	1903-01-31	underground	Paris 10th, Paris 19th	3,043,606		(until 1945: Combat)	Colonel Fabien
Commerce	Paris Metro Line 8	1937-07-27	underground	Paris 15th	2,212,666		platforms offset	Commerce
Concorde	Paris Metro Line 1 Paris Metro Line 8 Paris Metro Line 12	: 1900-08-13 : 1914-04-12 : 1910-11-05	underground	Paris 1st, Paris 8th	3,401,219			Concorde
Convention	Paris Metro Line 12	1910-11-05	underground	Paris 15th	3,734,750			Convention
Corentin Cariou	Paris Metro Line 7	1910-11-05	underground	Paris 19th	1,697,076		(until 1946: Pont de Flandres)	Corentin Cariou
Corentin Celton	Paris Metro Line 12	1934-03-24	underground	Issy-les-Moulineaux	2,504,682		(until 1945: Petits Ménages)	Corentin Celton
Corvisart	Paris Metro Line 6	1906-04-24	elevated	Paris 13th	1,570,331		line 2 Sud from opening until 1907; line 5 from 1907 until 1942	Corvisart
Coteaux Beauclair (Noisy-le-Sec–Rosny-sous-Bois)	Paris Metro Line 11	2024-06-13	elevated	Rosny-sous-Bois, Noisy-le-Sec	/			Coteaux Beauclair
Cour Saint-Émilion	Paris Metro Line 14	1998-10-15	underground	Paris 12th	2,985,122			Cour Saint-Émilion
Courcelles	Paris Metro Line 2	1902-10-07	underground	Paris 8th, Paris 17th	1,583,429			Courcelles
Couronnes	Paris Metro Line 2	1903-01-31	underground	Paris 11th, Paris 20th	2,151,515		1903 Paris Metro fire, 84 people died	Couronnes
Créteil–L'Échat (Hôpital Henri Mondor)	Paris Metro Line 8	1973-09-24	ground level	Créteil	1,660,120			Créteil–L'Échat
Créteil–Préfecture (Hôtel de Ville)	Paris Metro Line 8	1974-09-09	ground level	Créteil	3,330,602			Créteil–Préfecture
Créteil–Université	Paris Metro Line 8	1974-09-09	ground level	Créteil	2,496,595	Tvm		Créteil–Université
Crimée	Paris Metro Line 7	1910-11-05	underground	Paris 19th	3,543,952			Crimée
Croix de Chavaux (Place Jacques Duclos)	Paris Metro Line 9	1937-10-14	underground	Montreuil	3,729,545			Croix de Chavaux
Danube	Paris Metro Line 7bis	1911-01-18	underground	Paris 19th	400,157		platform only in direction Louis Blanc; line 7 from opening until 1967	Danube
Daumesnil (Félix Éboué)	Paris Metro Line 6 Paris Metro Line 8	: 1909-03-01 : 1931-05-05	underground	Paris 12th	3,634,023			Daumesnil
Denfert-Rochereau (Colonel Rol-Tanguy)	Paris Metro Line 4 Paris Metro Line 6	: 1909-10-30 : 1906-04-24	underground	Paris 14th	2,543,959	RER RER B	: line 2 Sud from opening until 1907; line 5 from 1907 until 1942	Denfert-Rochereau
Dugommier	Paris Metro Line 6	1909-03-01	underground	Paris 12th	1,725,412		(until 1939: Charenton)	Dugommier
Dupleix	Paris Metro Line 6	1906-04-24	elevated	Paris 15th	2,028,963		line 2 Sud from opening until 1907; line 5 from 1907 until 1942	Dupleix
Duroc	Paris Metro Line 10 Paris Metro Line 13	: 1923-12-30 : 1937-07-29	underground	Paris 6th, Paris 7th, Paris 15th	2,645,064		: station moved in 1937 : previously used by line 10; old line 14 from 1937 until 1976	Duroc
École Militaire	Paris Metro Line 8	1913-07-13	underground	Paris 7th	2,805,976			École Militaire
École Vétérinaire de Maisons-Alfort	Paris Metro Line 8	1970-09-19	underground	Maisons-Alfort	2,269,487		(until 1996: Maisons-Alfort–École Vétérinaire)	École Vétérinaire de Maisons-Alfort
Edgar Quinet	Paris Metro Line 6	1906-04-24	underground	Paris 14th	1,349,178		line 2 Sud from opening until 1907; line 5 from 1907 until 1942	Edgar Quinet
Église d'Auteuil	Paris Metro Line 10	1913-09-30	underground	Paris 16th	124,941		(until 1921: Wilhem) platform only in direction Boulogne–Pont de Saint-Cloud; line 8 from opening until 1937	Église d'Auteuil
Église de Pantin	Paris Metro Line 5	1942-10-12	underground	Pantin	2,832,467			Église de Pantin
Esplanade de La Défense	Paris Metro Line 1	1992-04-01	underground	Courbevoie, Puteaux	4,708,183			Esplanade de La Défense
Étienne Marcel	Paris Metro Line 4	1908-04-21	underground	Paris 1st, Paris 2nd	1,705,639			Étienne Marcel
Europe (Simone Veil)	Paris Metro Line 3	1904-10-19	underground	Paris 8th	1,106,459			Europe
Exelmans	Paris Metro Line 9	1922-11-08	underground	Paris 16th	1,607,223			Exelmans
Faidherbe–Chaligny	Paris Metro Line 8	1931-05-05	underground	Paris 11th, Paris 12th	2,190,416			Faidherbe–Chaligny
Falguière	Paris Metro Line 12	1910-11-05	underground	Paris 15th	650,291			Falguière
Félix Faure	Paris Metro Line 8	1937-07-27	underground	Paris 15th	1,161,978			Félix Faure
Filles du Calvaire	Paris Metro Line 8	1931-05-05	underground	Paris 3rd, Paris 11th	1,093,673			Filles du Calvaire
Fort d'Aubervilliers	Paris Metro Line 7	1979-10-04	underground	Aubervilliers	3,103,518			Fort d'Aubervilliers
Franklin D. Roosevelt	Paris Metro Line 1 Paris Metro Line 9	: 1900-07-19 : 1923-05-27	underground	Paris 8th	6,173,830		(until 1942: Marbeuf; from 1942 until 1946: Marbeuf–Rond-Point des Champs-Élysées)	Franklin D. Roosevelt
Front Populaire (Aubervilliers–Saint-Denis)	Paris Metro Line 12	2012-12-18	underground	Aubervilliers, Saint-Denis	1,948,542			Front Populaire
Gabriel Péri (Asnières–Gennevilliers)	Paris Metro Line 13	1980-05-03	underground	Asnières-sur-Seine, Gennevilliers	3,790,573		(until 2008: Gabriel Péri–Asnières–Gennevilliers)	Gabriel Péri
Gaîté (Joséphine Baker)	Paris Metro Line 13	1937-01-21	underground	Paris 14th	1,644,148		old line 14 from opening until 1976	Gaîté
Gallieni (Parc de Bagnolet)	Paris Metro Line 3	1971-04-02	underground	Bagnolet	3,899,195			Gallieni
Gambetta	Paris Metro Line 3 Paris Metro Line 3bis	1905-01-25	underground	Paris 20th	4,796,724		line 3bis since 1971 : station moved in 1969	Gambetta
Gare d'Austerlitz	Paris Metro Line 5 Paris Metro Line 10	: 1906-06-02 : 1939-07-12	: elevated : undergr.	Paris 5th, Paris 13th	6,318,543	Intercités, TER Centre-Val de Loire	(until 1930: Gare d'Orléans; from 1930 until 1985: Gare d'Orléans–Austerlitz)	Gare d'Austerlitz
Gare de l'Est (Verdun)	Paris Metro Line 4 Paris Metro Line 5 Paris Metro Line 7	: 1908-04-21 : 1907-11-15 : 1910-11-05	underground	Paris 10th	15,538,471	, TGV, TER Grand Est	: shared platform	Gare de l'Est
Gare de Lyon	Paris Metro Line 1 Paris Metro Line 14	: 1900-07-19 : 1998-10-15	underground	Paris 12th	28,640,475	, TGV, TER Bourgogne-Franche-Comté		Gare de Lyon
Gare du Nord	Paris Metro Line 4 Paris Metro Line 5	: 1908-04-21 : 1907-11-15	underground	Paris 10th	34,503,097	, Eurostar, Thalys, TGV, Intercités, TER Hauts-de-France (Magenta)	: station moved in 1942	Gare du Nord
Garibaldi	Paris Metro Line 13	1952-06-30	underground	Saint-Ouen-sur-Seine	1,965,002			Garibaldi
George V	Paris Metro Line 1	1900-08-13	underground	Paris 8th	3,842,260		(until 1920: Alma)	George V
Glacière	Paris Metro Line 6	1906-04-24	elevated	Paris 13th	3,005,750		line 2 Sud from opening until 1907; line 5 from 1907 until 1942	Glacière
Goncourt (Hôpital Saint-Louis)	Paris Metro Line 11	1935-04-28	underground	Paris 10th, Paris 11th	2,199,170			Goncourt
Grands Boulevards	Paris Metro Line 8 Paris Metro Line 9	: 1931-05-05 : 1933-12-10	underground	Paris 2nd, Paris 9th	3,737,316		(until 1998: Rue Montmartre)	Grands Boulevards
Guy Môquet	Paris Metro Line 13	1911-02-26	underground	Paris 17th, Paris 18th	2,205,313		(until 1912: Carrefour Marcadet; from 1912 until 1946: Marcadet–Balagny)	Guy Môquet
Havre–Caumartin	Paris Metro Line 3 Paris Metro Line 9	: 1904-10-19 : 1923-06-03	underground	Paris 9th	5,894,982	(Auber) (Haussmann–Saint-Lazare)	(until 1926: Caumartin)	Havre–Caumartin
Hoche	Paris Metro Line 5	1942-10-12	underground	Pantin	3,928,404			Hoche
Hôpital Bicêtre (Kremlin-Bicêtre–Gentilly)	Paris Metro Line 14	2024-06-24	underground	Le Kremlin-Bicêtre	/			Hôpital Bicêtre
Hôtel de Ville	Paris Metro Line 1 Paris Metro Line 11	: 1900-07-19 : 1935-04-28	underground	Paris 4th	7,251,729			Hôtel de Ville
Iéna	Paris Metro Line 9	1923-05-27	underground	Paris 16th	1,646,925			Iéna
Invalides	Paris Metro Line 8 Paris Metro Line 13	: 1913-07-13 : 1923-12-30	underground	Paris 7th	3,482,080	RER RER C	: line 10 from opening until 1937; old line 14 from 1937 until 1976	Invalides
Jacques Bonsergent	Paris Metro Line 5	1906-12-17	underground	Paris 10th	1,743,989		(until 1946: Lancry)	Jacques Bonsergent
Jasmin	Paris Metro Line 9	1922-11-08	underground	Paris 16th	1,418,238			Jasmin
Jaurès	Paris Metro Line 2 Paris Metro Line 5 Paris Metro Line 7bis	: 1903-02-23 : 1942-10-12 : 1911-01-18	: elevated : undergr.	Paris 10th, Paris 19th	4,055,461		(until 1914: Rue d'Allemagne) : line 7 from opening until 1967	Jaurès
Javel–André Citroën	Paris Metro Line 10	1913-09-30	underground	Paris 15th	1,589,561	(Javel)	line 8 from opening until 1937	Javel–André Citroën
Jourdain	Paris Metro Line 11	1935-04-28	underground	Paris 19th, Paris 20th	1,881,321			Jourdain
Jules Joffrin	Paris Metro Line 12	1912-10-31	underground	Paris 18th	2,854,819			Jules Joffrin
Jussieu	Paris Metro Line 7 Paris Metro Line 10	1931-04-26	underground	Paris 5th	2,889,642			Jussieu
Kléber	Paris Metro Line 6	1900-10-02	underground	Paris 16th	724,215		operational terminus; branch of line 1 from opening until 1903; line 2 Sud from 1903 until 1907; line 5 from 1907 until 1942	Kléber
L'Haÿ-les-Roses	Paris Metro Line 14	2024-06-24	underground	L'Haÿ-les-Roses	/			L'Haÿ-les-Roses
La Chapelle	Paris Metro Line 2	1903-01-31	elevated	Paris 10th, Paris 18th	4,855,531	,, Eurostar, Thalys, TGV, Intercités, TER Hauts-de-France (Gare du Nord) (Magenta)		La Chapelle
La Courneuve–8 mai 1945	Paris Metro Line 7	1987-05-06	underground	La Courneuve	4,924,444	Tramways in Île-de-France Île-de-France tramway Line 1		La Courneuve–8 mai 1945
La Défense (Grande Arche)	Paris Metro Line 1	1992-04-01	underground	Puteaux	9,256,802	RER RER A RER E Transilien Transilien Line L (Paris-Saint-Lazare) Transilien Line U Tramways in Île-de-France Île-de-France tramway Line 2	(until 1997: Grande Arche de La Défense)	La Défense
La Dhuys (Rosny-sous-Bois–Montreuil)	Paris Metro Line 11	2024-06-13	underground	Montreuil, Rosny-sous-Bois	/			La Dhuys
La Fourche	Paris Metro Line 13	1911-02-26	underground	Paris 17th, Paris 18th	1,829,271			La Fourche
La Motte-Picquet–Grenelle	Paris Metro Line 6 Paris Metro Line 8 Paris Metro Line 10	: 1906-04-24 : 1913-07-13 : 1937-07-29	: elevated : undergr.	Paris 15th	5,117,708		(until 1913: La Motte-Picquet) : line 2 Sud from opening until 1907; line 5 from 1907 until 1942 : shared platform in one direction	La Motte-Picquet–Grenelle
La Muette	Paris Metro Line 9	1922-11-08	underground	Paris 16th	3,010,370	(Boulainvilliers)		La Muette
La Tour-Maubourg	Paris Metro Line 8	1913-07-13	underground	Paris 7th	1,361,723			La Tour-Maubourg
Lamarck–Caulaincourt	Paris Metro Line 12	1912-10-31	underground	Paris 18th	1,875,717			Lamarck–Caulaincourt
Laumière	Paris Metro Line 5	1942-10-12	underground	Paris 19th	3,258,568			Laumière
Le Kremlin–Bicêtre	Paris Metro Line 7	1982-12-10	underground	Le Kremlin-Bicêtre	2,925,325			Le Kremlin–Bicêtre
Le Peletier	Paris Metro Line 7	1911-06-06	underground	Paris 9th	1,677,832			Le Peletier
Ledru-Rollin	Paris Metro Line 8	1931-05-05	underground	Paris 11th, Paris 12th	2,570,283			Ledru-Rollin
Les Agnettes (Asnières–Gennevilliers)	Paris Metro Line 13	2008-06-14	underground	Asnières-sur-Seine, Gennevilliers	1,890,356			Les Agnettes
Les Courtilles (Asnières–Gennevilliers)	Paris Metro Line 13	2008-06-14	underground	Asnières-sur-Seine, Gennevilliers	2,802,689	Tramways in Île-de-France Île-de-France tramway Line 1		Les Courtilles
Les Gobelins	Paris Metro Line 7	1930-02-15	underground	Paris 5th, Paris 13th	2,365,942		line 10 from opening until 1931	Les Gobelins
Les Halles	Paris Metro Line 4	1908-04-21	underground	Paris 1st	10,623,876	(Châtelet–Les Halles)	station moved in 1977	Les Halles
Les Sablons (Jardin d'Acclimatation)	Paris Metro Line 1	1937-04-29	underground	Neuilly-sur-Seine	3,954,920			Les Sablons
Liberté	Paris Metro Line 8	1942-10-05	underground	Charenton-le-Pont	1,704,609			Liberté
Liège	Paris Metro Line 13	1911-02-26	underground	Paris 8th, Paris 9th	1,143,956		(until 1914: Berlin) platforms offset; closed from 1939 until 1968	Liège
Louis Blanc	Paris Metro Line 7 Paris Metro Line 7bis	1910-11-23	underground	Paris 10th	1,548,029		shared platform between the two lines; line 7bis since 1967	Louis Blanc
Louise Michel	Paris Metro Line 3	1937-09-24	underground	Levallois-Perret	2,319,185		(until 1946: Vallier)	Louise Michel
Lourmel	Paris Metro Line 8	1937-07-27	underground	Paris 15th	1,696,432			Lourmel
Louvre–Rivoli	Paris Metro Line 1	1900-08-13	underground	Paris 1st	1,869,612		(until 1989: Louvre)	Louvre–Rivoli
Mabillon	Paris Metro Line 10	1925-03-10	underground	Paris 6th	1,195,051			Mabillon
Madeleine	Paris Metro Line 8 Paris Metro Line 12 Paris Metro Line 14	: 1913-07-13 : 1910-11-05 : 1998-11-15	underground	Paris 8th	5,330,928			Madeleine
Mairie d'Aubervilliers (Plaine des Vertus)	Paris Metro Line 12	2022-05-31	underground	Aubervilliers	/			Mairie d'Aubervillliers
Mairie d'Issy	Paris Metro Line 12	1934-03-24	underground	Issy-les-Moulineaux	2,874,138			Mairie d'Issy
Mairie d'Ivry	Paris Metro Line 7	1946-05-01	underground	Ivry-sur-Seine	2,042,071			Mairie d'Ivry
Mairie de Clichy	Paris Metro Line 13	1980-05-03	underground	Clichy	4,043,071			Mairie de Clichy
Mairie de Montreuil	Paris Metro Line 9	1937-10-14	underground	Montreuil	6,158,487			Mairie de Montreuil
Mairie de Montrouge	Paris Metro Line 4	2013-03-23	underground	Montrouge	4,316,647			Mairie de Montrouge
Mairie de Saint-Ouen	Paris Metro Line 13 Paris Metro Line 14	: 1952-06-30 : 2020-12-14	underground	Saint-Ouen-sur-Seine	4,830,810			Mairie de Saint-Ouen
Mairie des Lilas	Paris Metro Line 11	1937-02-17	underground	Les Lilas	2,894,622			Mairie des Lilas
Maison Blanche	Paris Metro Line 7 Paris Metro Line 14	: 1930-03-07 : 2024-06-24	underground	Paris 13th	1,203,631		: line 10 from opening until 1931	Maison Blanche
Maisons-Alfort–Les Juilliottes	Paris Metro Line 8	1972-04-24	underground	Maisons-Alfort	1,297,495			Maisons-Alfort–Les Juilliottes
Maisons-Alfort–Stade	Paris Metro Line 8	1970-09-19	underground	Maisons-Alfort	1,702,479			Maisons-Alfort–Stade
Malakoff–Plateau de Vanves	Paris Metro Line 13	1976-11-09	underground	Malakoff	2,242,320			Malakoff–Plateau de Vanves
Malakoff–Rue Étienne Dolet	Paris Metro Line 13	1976-11-09	elevated	Malakoff	1,450,451			Malakoff–Rue Étienne Dolet
Malesherbes	Paris Metro Line 3	1910-05-23	underground	Paris 17th	1,427,143			Malesherbes
Maraîchers	Paris Metro Line 9	1933-12-10	underground	Paris 20th	1,994,064			Maraîchers
Marcadet–Poissonniers	Paris Metro Line 4 Paris Metro Line 12	: 1908-04-21 : 1916-08-23	underground	Paris 18th	3,982,005		(until 1931: Marcadet for line 4, Poissonniers for line 12)	Marcadet–Poissonniers
Marcel Sembat	Paris Metro Line 9	1934-02-03	underground	Boulogne-Billancourt	3,874,792			Marcel Sembat
Marx Dormoy	Paris Metro Line 12	1916-08-23	underground	Paris 18th	2,425,928		(until 1946: Torcy)	Marx Dormoy
Maubert–Mutualité	Paris Metro Line 10	1930-02-15	underground	Paris 5th	1,280,387			Maubert–Mutualité
Ménilmontant	Paris Metro Line 2	1903-01-31	underground	Paris 11th, Paris 20th	2,847,264			Ménilmontant
Michel Bizot	Paris Metro Line 8	1931-05-05	underground	Paris 12th	1,403,416			Michel Bizot
Michel-Ange–Auteuil	Paris Metro Line 9 Paris Metro Line 10	: 1922-11-08 : 1913-09-30	underground	Paris 16th	1,512,050		: platform only in direction Boulogne–Pont de Saint-Cloud; line 8 from opening until 1937	Michel-Ange–Auteuil
Michel-Ange–Molitor	Paris Metro Line 9 Paris Metro Line 10	: 1922-11-08 : 1913-09-30	underground	Paris 16th	1,420,552		: platform only in direction Gare d'Austerlitz; line 8 from opening until 1937	Michel-Ange–Molitor
Mirabeau	Paris Metro Line 10	1913-09-30	underground	Paris 16th	1,001,302		platform only in direction Gare d'Austerlitz; line 8 from opening until 1937	Mirabeau
Miromesnil	Paris Metro Line 9 Paris Metro Line 13	: 1923-05-27 : 1973-06-27	underground	Paris 8th	3,647,255			Miromesnil
Monceau	Paris Metro Line 2	1902-10-07	underground	Paris 8th, Paris 17th	1,148,677			Monceau
Montgallet	Paris Metro Line 8	1931-05-05	underground	Paris 12th	1,108,395			Montgallet
Montparnasse–Bienvenüe	Paris Metro Line 4 Paris Metro Line 6 Paris Metro Line 12 Paris Metro Line 13	: 1910-01-09 : 1906-04-24 : 1910-11-05 : 1937-01-21	underground	Paris 6th, Paris 14th, Paris 15th	20,407,224	, TGV, Intercités, TER (Gare Montparnasse)	(until 1946: different station names for different lines; see station article) : line 2 Sud from opening until 1907; line 5 from 1907 until 1942 : old line 14 from opening until 1976	Montparnasse–Bienvenüe
Montreuil–Hôpital	Paris Metro Line 11	2024-06-13	underground	Montreuil	/			Montreuil–Hôpital
Mouton-Duvernet	Paris Metro Line 4	1909-10-30	underground	Paris 14th	1,131,403			Mouton-Duvernet
Nation ( Place des Antilles)	Paris Metro Line 1 Paris Metro Line 2 Paris Metro Line 6 Paris Metro Line 9	: 1900-07-19 : 1903-04-02 : 1909-04-01 : 1933-12-10	underground	Paris 11th, Paris 12th	6,050,797	RER RER A		Nation
Nationale	Paris Metro Line 6	1909-03-01	elevated	Paris 13th	1,320,290			Nationale
Notre-Dame-de-Lorette	Paris Metro Line 12	1910-11-05	underground	Paris 9th	1,893,828			Notre-Dame-de-Lorette
Notre-Dame-des-Champs	Paris Metro Line 12	1910-11-05	underground	Paris 6th	1,487,256			Notre-Dame-des-Champs
Oberkampf	Paris Metro Line 5 Paris Metro Line 9	: 1907-01-15 : 1933-12-10	underground	Paris 11th	3,205,110			Oberkampf
Odéon	Paris Metro Line 4 Paris Metro Line 10	: 1910-01-09 : 1926-02-14	underground	Paris 6th	3,478,491			Odéon
Olympiades	Paris Metro Line 14	2007-06-26	underground	Paris 13th	5,214,595			Olympiades
Opéra	Paris Metro Line 3 Paris Metro Line 7 Paris Metro Line 8	: 1904-10-19 : 1910-11-05 : 1913-07-13	underground	Paris 2nd, Paris 9th	5,193,831	(Auber)		Opéra
Ourcq	Paris Metro Line 5	1947-03-21	underground	Paris 19th	2,862,337			Ourcq
Palais Royal–Musée du Louvre	Paris Metro Line 1 Paris Metro Line 7	: 1900-07-19 : 1916-07-01	underground	Paris 1st	4,822,599		(until 1989: Palais Royal)	Palais Royal–Musée du Louvre
Parmentier	Paris Metro Line 3	1904-10-19	underground	Paris 11th	2,037,234			Parmentier
Passy	Paris Metro Line 6	1903-11-06	ground level	Paris 16th	2,080,548		: line 2 Sud from opening until 1907; line 5 from 1907 until 1942	Passy
Pasteur	Paris Metro Line 6 Paris Metro Line 12	: 1906-04-24 : 1910-11-05	underground	Paris 15th	3,026,286		: line 2 Sud from opening until 1907; line 5 from 1907 until 1942	Pasteur
Pelleport	Paris Metro Line 3bis	1921-11-27	underground	Paris 20th	229,524		line 3 from opening until 1971	Pelleport
Père Lachaise	Paris Metro Line 2 Paris Metro Line 3	: 1903-02-25 : 1904-10-19	underground	Paris 11th, Paris 20th	3,465,307			Père Lachaise
Pereire (Maréchal Juin)	Paris Metro Line 3	1910-05-23	underground	Paris 17th	3,130,190	(Pereire–Levallois)		Pereire
Pernety	Paris Metro Line 13	1937-01-21	underground	Paris 14th	2,173,567		old line 14 from opening until 1976	Pernety
Philippe Auguste	Paris Metro Line 2	1903-01-31	underground	Paris 11th, Paris 20th	1,262,653			Philippe Auguste
Picpus (Courteline)	Paris Metro Line 6	1909-03-01	underground	Paris 12th	931,602		(until 1937: Saint-Mandé)	Picpus
Pierre et Marie Curie	Paris Metro Line 7	1946-05-01	underground	Ivry-sur-Seine	1,100,552		(until 2007: Pierre Curie)	Pierre et Marie Curie
Pigalle	Paris Metro Line 2 Paris Metro Line 12	: 1902-10-07 : 1911-04-08	underground	Paris 9th, Paris 18th	3,501,831			Pigalle
Place d'Italie	Paris Metro Line 5 Paris Metro Line 6 Paris Metro Line 7	: 1906-06-02 : 1906-04-24 : 1930-02-15	underground	Paris 13th	7,119,097		: line 2 Sud from opening until 1907; closed from 1907 until 1909 : line 10 from opening until 1931	Place d'Italie
Place de Clichy	Paris Metro Line 2 Paris Metro Line 13	: 1902-10-07 : 1911-02-26	underground	Paris 8th, Paris 9th, Paris 17th, Paris 18th	5,161,932			Place de Clichy
Place des Fêtes	Paris Metro Line 7bis Paris Metro Line 11	: 1911-07-18 : 1935-04-28	underground	Paris 19th	2,318,764		: platform only in direction Pré-Saint-Gervais; line 7 from opening until 1967	Place des Fêtes
Place Monge (Jardin des Plantes–Arènes de Lutèce)	Paris Metro Line 7	1930-02-15	underground	Paris 5th	1,837,996		line 10 from opening until 1931	Place Monge
Plaisance	Paris Metro Line 13	1937-01-21	underground	Paris 14th	3,521,753		old line 14 from opening until 1976	Plaisance
Pointe du Lac (Créteil)	Paris Metro Line 8	2011-10-08	ground level	Créteil	2,114,438			Pointe du Lac
Poissonnière	Paris Metro Line 7	1910-11-05	underground	Paris 9th, Paris 10th	2,306,725			Poissonnière
Pont Cardinet	Paris Metro Line 14	2020-12-14	underground	Paris 17th	4,168,538	Transilien Transilien Line L (Paris-Saint-Lazare)		Pont Cardinet
Pont de Levallois–Bécon	Paris Metro Line 3	1937-09-24	underground	Levallois-Perret	2,984,777			Pont de Levallois–Bécon
Pont de Neuilly	Paris Metro Line 1	1937-04-29	underground	Neuilly-sur-Seine	4,809,503			Pont de Neuilly
Pont de Sèvres (La Seine Musicale)	Paris Metro Line 9	1934-02-03	underground	Boulogne-Billancourt	3,430,203	(Musée de Sèvres)		Pont de Sèvres
Pont Marie (Cité des Arts)	Paris Metro Line 7	1926-04-16	underground	Paris 4th	1,101,482			Pont Marie
Pont Neuf (La Monnaie)	Paris Metro Line 7	1926-04-16	underground	Paris 1st	1,188,930			Pont Neuf
Porte d'Auteuil	Paris Metro Line 10	1913-09-30	underground	Paris 16th	375,748		platform only in direction Boulogne–Pont de Saint-Cloud; line 8 from opening until 1937	Porte d'Auteuil
Porte d'Italie	Paris Metro Line 7	1930-03-07	underground	Paris 13th	1,507,152	Tramways in Île-de-France Île-de-France tramway Line 3a	line 10 from opening until 1931	Porte d'Italie
Porte d'Ivry	Paris Metro Line 7	1931-04-26	underground	Paris 13th	1,282,199	Tramways in Île-de-France Île-de-France tramway Line 3a		Porte d'Ivry
Porte d'Orléans	Paris Metro Line 4	1909-10-30	underground	Paris 14th	4,175,817	Tramways in Île-de-France Île-de-France tramway Line 3a		Porte d'Orléans
Porte Dauphine (Maréchal de Lattre de Tassigny)	Paris Metro Line 2	1900-12-13	underground	Paris 16th	2,021,656	(Avenue Foch)		Porte Dauphine
Porte de Bagnolet	Paris Metro Line 3	1971-04-02	underground	Paris 20th	3,085,790	Tramways in Île-de-France Île-de-France tramway Line 3b		Porte de Bagnolet
Porte de Champerret	Paris Metro Line 3	1911-02-15	underground	Paris 17th	2,101,673	Tramways in Île-de-France Île-de-France tramway Line 3b		Porte de Champerret
Porte de Charenton	Paris Metro Line 8	1931-05-05	underground	Paris 12th	1,529,778	Tramways in Île-de-France Île-de-France tramway Line 3a		Porte de Charenton
Porte de Choisy	Paris Metro Line 7	1930-03-07	underground	Paris 13th	1,592,144	Tramways in Île-de-France Île-de-France tramway Line 3a Île-de-France tramway Line 9	line 10 from opening until 1931	Porte de Choisy
Porte de Clichy (Tribunal de Paris)	Paris Metro Line 13 Paris Metro Line 14	: 1912-01-20 : 2021-01-28	underground	Paris 17th	5,278,497	RER RER C Tramways in Île-de-France Île-de-France tramway Line 3b		Porte de Clichy
Porte de Clignancourt (Puces de Saint-Ouen)	Paris Metro Line 4	1908-04-21	underground	Paris 18th	5,611,814	Tramways in Île-de-France Île-de-France tramway Line 3b		Porte de Clignancourt
Porte de la Chapelle (Saint-Denis)	Paris Metro Line 12	1916-08-23	underground	Paris 18th	1,866,281	Tramways in Île-de-France Île-de-France tramway Line 3b		Porte de la Chapelle
Porte de la Villette (Cité des Sciences et de l'Industrie)	Paris Metro Line 7	1910-11-05	underground	Paris 19th	2,706,288	Tramways in Île-de-France Île-de-France tramway Line 3b		Porte de la Villette
Porte de Montreuil	Paris Metro Line 9	1933-12-10	underground	Paris 20th	3,067,413	Tramways in Île-de-France Île-de-France tramway Line 3b		Porte de Montreuil
Porte de Pantin (Parc de la Villette)	Paris Metro Line 5	1942-10-12	underground	Paris 19th	3,374,733	Tramways in Île-de-France Île-de-France tramway Line 3b		Porte de Pantin
Porte de Saint-Cloud (Parc des Princes)	Paris Metro Line 9	1923-09-29	underground	Paris 16th	3,485,946			Porte de Saint-Cloud
Porte de Saint-Ouen	Paris Metro Line 13	1911-02-26	underground	Paris 17th, Paris 18th	2,710,638	Tramways in Île-de-France Île-de-France tramway Line 3b		Porte de Saint-Ouen
Porte de Vanves	Paris Metro Line 13	1937-01-21	underground	Paris 14th	3,395,358	Tramways in Île-de-France Île-de-France tramway Line 3a	old line 14 from opening until 1976	Porte de Vanves
Porte de Versailles (Parc des Expositions de Paris)	Paris Metro Line 12	1910-11-05	underground	Paris 15th	3,268,157	Tramways in Île-de-France Île-de-France tramway Line 2 Île-de-France tramway Line 3a	station moved in 1934	Porte de Versailles
Porte de Vincennes	Paris Metro Line 1	1900-07-19	underground	Paris 12th, Paris 20th	5,446,602	Tramways in Île-de-France Île-de-France tramway Line 3a Île-de-France tramway Line 3b		Porte de Vincennes
Porte des Lilas	Paris Metro Line 3bis Paris Metro Line 11	: 1921-11-27 : 1935-04-28	underground	Paris 19th, Paris 20th	3,105,016	Tramways in Île-de-France Île-de-France tramway Line 3b	: line 3 from opening until 1971	Porte des Lilas
Porte Dorée	Paris Metro Line 8	1931-05-05	underground	Paris 12th	1,918,182	Tramways in Île-de-France Île-de-France tramway Line 3a		Porte Dorée
Porte Maillot (Palais des Congrès)	Paris Metro Line 1	1900-07-19	underground	Paris 16th, Paris 17th	4,138,301	(Neuilly–Porte Maillot)	station moved in 1937	Porte Maillot
Pré-Saint-Gervais	Paris Metro Line 7bis	1911-01-18	underground	Paris 19th	282,626	(Hôpital Robert Debré)	official terminus on turning loop; line 7 from opening until 1967	Pré-Saint-Gervais
Pyramides	Paris Metro Line 7 Paris Metro Line 14	: 1916-07-01 : 1998-10-15	underground	Paris 1st	3,962,698			Pyramides
Pyrénées	Paris Metro Line 11	1935-04-28	underground	Paris 19th, Paris 20th	2,288,587			Pyrénées
Quai de la Gare	Paris Metro Line 6	1909-03-01	elevated	Paris 13th	1,735,465			Quai de la Gare
Quai de la Rapée	Paris Metro Line 5	1906-07-13	ground level	Paris 12th	798,728		(until 1907: Place Mazas; from 1907 until 1916: Pont d'Austerlitz)	Quai de la Rapée
Quatre-Septembre	Paris Metro Line 3	1904-11-03	underground	Paris 2nd	1,165,004			Quatre-Septembre
Rambuteau (Centre Georges Pompidou)	Paris Metro Line 11	1935-04-28	underground	Paris 3rd, Paris 4th	2,127,291			Rambuteau
Ranelagh	Paris Metro Line 9	1922-11-08	underground	Paris 16th	1,779,206			Ranelagh
Raspail	Paris Metro Line 4 Paris Metro Line 6	: 1909-10-30 : 1906-04-24	underground	Paris 14th	1,238,357		: line 2 Sud from opening until 1907; line 5 from 1907 until 1942	Raspail
Réaumur–Sébastopol	Paris Metro Line 3 Paris Metro Line 4	: 1904-10-19 : 1908-04-21	underground	Paris 2nd, Paris 3rd	3,579,544		(until 1907: Rue Saint-Denis)	Réaumur–Sébastopol
Rennes	Paris Metro Line 12	1910-11-05	underground	Paris 6th	861,334		closed from 1939 until 1968	Rennes
République	Paris Metro Line 3 Paris Metro Line 5 Paris Metro Line 8 Paris Metro Line 9 Paris Metro Line 11	: 1904-10-19 : 1907-11-15 : 1931-05-05 : 1933-12-10 : 1935-04-28	underground	Paris 3rd, Paris 10th, Paris 11th	11,079,708			République
Reuilly–Diderot	Paris Metro Line 1 Paris Metro Line 8	: 1900-08-20 : 1931-05-05	underground	Paris 12th	4,580,091		(until 1931: Rue de Reuilly)	Reuilly–Diderot
Richard-Lenoir	Paris Metro Line 5	1906-12-17	underground	Paris 11th	1,544,636			Richard-Lenoir
Richelieu–Drouot	Paris Metro Line 8 Paris Metro Line 9	1928-06-30	underground	Paris 2nd, Paris 9th	2,994,510			Richelieu–Drouot
Riquet	Paris Metro Line 7	1910-11-05	underground	Paris 19th	1,588,438			Riquet
Robespierre	Paris Metro Line 9	1937-10-14	underground	Montreuil	2,986,308			Robespierre
Romainville–Carnot	Paris Metro Line 11	2024-06-13	underground	Romainville	/			Romainville–Carnot
Rome	Paris Metro Line 2	1902-11-06	underground	Paris 8th, Paris 17th	1,696,331			Rome
Rosny–Bois-Perrier	Paris Metro Line 11	2024-06-13	underground	Rosny-sous-Bois	/	RER RER E		Rosny–Bois-Perrier
Rue de la Pompe (Avenue Georges Mandel)	Paris Metro Line 9	1922-11-08	underground	Paris 16th	2,449,458			Rue de la Pompe
Rue des Boulets	Paris Metro Line 9	1933-12-10	underground	Paris 11th	1,832,442		(until 1998: Rue des Boulets–Rue de Montreuil)	Rue des Boulets
Rue du Bac	Paris Metro Line 12	1910-11-05	underground	Paris 7th	1,423,364			Rue du Bac
Rue Saint-Maur	Paris Metro Line 3	1904-10-19	underground	Paris 11th	2,004,445		(until 1998: Saint-Maur)	Rue Saint-Maur
Saint-Ambroise	Paris Metro Line 9	1933-12-10	underground	Paris 11th	2,158,466			Saint-Ambroise
Saint-Augustin	Paris Metro Line 9	1923-05-27	underground	Paris 8th	1,934,106	(Saint-Lazare)		Saint-Augustin
Saint-Denis–Pleyel	Paris Metro Line 14	2024-06-24	underground	Saint-Denis	/	(Carrefour Pleyel) (Stade de France–Saint-Denis)		Saint-Denis–Pleyel
Saint-Denis–Porte de Paris (Stade de France)	Paris Metro Line 13	1976-05-26	underground	Saint-Denis	3,355,836	Tramways in Île-de-France Île-de-France tramway Line 8		Saint-Denis–Porte de Paris
Saint-Denis-Université	Paris Metro Line 13	1998-05-25	underground	Saint-Denis	3,569,990	(Guynemer)		Saint-Denis-Université
Saint-Fargeau	Paris Metro Line 3bis	1921-11-27	underground	Paris 20th	472,258		line 3 from opening until 1971	Saint-Fargeau
Saint-François-Xavier	Paris Metro Line 13	1923-12-30	underground	Paris 7th	1,213,378		line 10 from opening until 1937; old line 14 from 1937 until 1976	Saint-François-Xavier
Saint-Georges	Paris Metro Line 12	1911-04-08	underground	Paris 9th	1,258,381			Saint-Georges
Saint-Germain-des-Prés	Paris Metro Line 4	1910-01-09	underground	Paris 6th	2,378,860			Saint-Germain-des-Prés
Saint-Jacques	Paris Metro Line 6	1906-04-24	ground level	Paris 14th	1,407,837		line 2 Sud from opening until 1907; line 5 from 1907 until 1942	Saint-Jacques
Saint-Lazare	Paris Metro Line 3 Paris Metro Line 12 Paris Metro Line 13 Paris Metro Line 14	: 1904-10-19 : 1910-11-05 : 1911-02-26 : 2003-12-16	underground	Paris 8th, Paris 9th	33,128,384	(Saint-Augustin) (Haussmann–Saint-Lazare), Intercités, TER Normandie		Saint-Lazare
Saint-Mandé	Paris Metro Line 1	1934-03-24	underground	Saint-Mandé	3,944,640		(until 1937: Tourelle; from 1937 until 2002: Saint-Mandé–Tourelle)	Saint-Mandé
Saint-Marcel	Paris Metro Line 5	1906-06-02	underground	Paris 13th	1,666,744			Saint-Marcel
Saint-Michel	Paris Metro Line 4	1910-09-09	underground	Paris 5th, Paris 6th	3,747,385	(Saint-Michel–Notre-Dame)		Saint-Michel
Saint-Ouen	Paris Metro Line 14	2020-12-14	underground	Clichy, Saint-Ouen-sur-Seine	3,420,852	RER RER C		Saint-Ouen
Saint-Paul (Le Marais)	Paris Metro Line 1	1900-08-06	underground	Paris 4th	4,295,823			Saint-Paul
Saint-Philippe du Roule	Paris Metro Line 9	1923-05-27	underground	Paris 8th	1,935,004			Saint-Philippe du Roule
Saint-Placide	Paris Metro Line 4	1910-01-09	underground	Paris 6th	2,391,205		(until 1913: Vaugirard)	Saint-Placide
Saint-Sébastien–Froissart	Paris Metro Line 8	1931-05-05	underground	Paris 3rd, Paris 11th	1,151,192		(until 1932: Saint-Sébastien)	Saint-Sébastien–Froissart
Saint-Sulpice	Paris Metro Line 4	1910-01-09	underground	Paris 6th	1,571,987			Saint-Sulpice
Ségur (UNESCO)	Paris Metro Line 10	1937-07-29	underground	Paris 7th, Paris 15th	1,100,151			Ségur
Sentier	Paris Metro Line 3	1904-11-20	underground	Paris 2nd	2,222,744			Sentier
Serge Gainsbourg (Les Lilas)	Paris Metro Line 11	2024-06-13	underground	Les Lilas	/			Serge Gainsbourg
Sèvres–Babylone	Paris Metro Line 10 Paris Metro Line 12	: 1923-12-30 : 1910-11-05	underground	Paris 6th, Paris 7th	3,392,504		(until 1923: Sèvres–Croix-Rouge)	Sèvres–Babylone
Sèvres–Lecourbe	Paris Metro Line 6	1906-04-24	elevated	Paris 15th	1,257,040		(until 1907: Avenue de Suffren; from 1907 until 1913: Rue de Sèvres) line 2 Sud from opening until 1907; line 5 from 1907 until 1942	Sèvres–Lecourbe
Simplon	Paris Metro Line 4	1908-05-14	underground	Paris 18th	2,056,501			Simplon
Solférino (Musée d'Orsay)	Paris Metro Line 12	1910-11-05	underground	Paris 7th	1,269,143	(Musée d'Orsay)		Solférino
Stalingrad	Paris Metro Line 2 Paris Metro Line 5 Paris Metro Line 7	: 1903-01-31 : 1942-10-12 : 1910-10-05	: elevated : undergr.	Paris 10th, Paris 19th	4,924,583		(until 1942: Aubervilliers; from 1942 until 1946: Aubervilliers–Boulevard de la Villette)	Stalingrad
Strasbourg–Saint-Denis	Paris Metro Line 4 Paris Metro Line 8 Paris Metro Line 9	: 1908-05-05 : 1931-05-05 : 1933-12-10	underground	Paris 2nd, Paris 3rd, Paris 10th	6,345,770		(until 1931: Boulevard Saint-Denis)	Strasbourg–Saint-Denis
Sully–Morland	Paris Metro Line 7	1930-06-03	underground	Paris 4th	1,124,169			Sully–Morland
Télégraphe	Paris Metro Line 11	1935-04-28	underground	Paris 19th, Paris 20th	1,636,898			Télégraphe
Temple	Paris Metro Line 3	1904-10-19	underground	Paris 3rd	891,858			Temple
Ternes	Paris Metro Line 2	1902-10-07	underground	Paris 8th, Paris 17th	2,292,256			Ternes
Thiais–Orly (Pont de Rungis)	Paris Metro Line 14	2024-06-24	underground	Thiais	/	(Pont de Rungis–Aéroport d'Orly)		Thiais–Orly
Tolbiac	Paris Metro Line 7	1930-03-07	underground	Paris 13th	2,287,918		line 10 from opening until 1931	Tolbiac
Trinité–d'Estienne d'Orves	Paris Metro Line 12	1910-11-05	underground	Paris 9th	1,051,982		(until 1945: Trinité)	Trinité–d'Estienne d'Orves
Trocadéro	Paris Metro Line 6 Paris Metro Line 9	: 1900-10-02 : 1922-11-08	underground	Paris 16th	5,284,134		: branch of line 1 from opening until 1903; line 2 Sud from 1903 until 1907; line 5 from 1907 until 1942	Trocadéro
Tuileries	Paris Metro Line 1	1900-07-19	underground	Paris 1st	1,859,552			Tuileries
Vaneau	Paris Metro Line 10	1923-12-30	underground	Paris 6th, Paris 7th	725,826			Vaneau
Varenne	Paris Metro Line 13	1923-12-30	underground	Paris 7th	782,697		line 10 from opening until 1937; old line 14 from 1937 until 1976; closed from 1939 until 1962	Varenne
Vaugirard (Adolphe Chérioux)	Paris Metro Line 12	1910-11-05	underground	Paris 15th	2,482,886			Vaugirard
Vavin	Paris Metro Line 4	1910-01-09	underground	Paris 6th, Paris 14th	1,322,588			Vavin
Victor Hugo	Paris Metro Line 2	1900-12-13	underground	Paris 16th	2,801,041		station moved in 1931	Victor Hugo
Villejuif–Gustave Roussy	Paris Metro Line 14	2025-01-18	underground	Villejuif	/			Villejuif–Gustave Roussy
Villejuif–Léo Lagrange	Paris Metro Line 7	1985-02-28	underground	Villejuif	1,952,627			Villejuif–Léo Lagrange
Villejuif–Louis Aragon	Paris Metro Line 7	1985-02-28	underground	Villejuif	5,218,070	Tramways in Île-de-France Île-de-France tramway Line 7		Villejuif–Louis Aragon
Villejuif–Paul Vaillant-Couturier (Hôpital Paul Brousse)	Paris Metro Line 7	1985-02-28	underground	Villejuif	1,764,879			Villejuif–Paul Vaillant-Couturier
Villiers	Paris Metro Line 2 Paris Metro Line 3	: 1903-01-26 : 1904-10-19	underground	Paris 8th, Paris 17th	3,586,376			Villiers
Volontaires	Paris Metro Line 12	1910-11-05	underground	Paris 15th	1,734,848			Volontaires
Voltaire (Léon Blum)	Paris Metro Line 9	1933-12-10	underground	Paris 11th	3,454,006			Voltaire
Wagram	Paris Metro Line 3	1910-05-23	underground	Paris 17th	1,508,617			Wagram

== Closed stations ==
=== Stations closed to the public ===
Station	Line(s)	Opening date	Closing date
Arsenal	Paris Metro Line 5	1906-12-17	1939-09-02
Champ de Mars	Paris Metro Line 8	1913-07-13	1939-09-02
Saint-Martin	Paris Metro Line 8 Paris Metro Line 9	: 1931-05-05 : 1933-12-10	1939-09-02
Croix-Rouge	Paris Metro Line 10	1923-12-10	1939-09-02

=== Stations that were never opened to the public ===
Station	Line(s)	Location	Status
La Défense–Michelet	Paris Metro Line 1	outside the network	never opened, foundations built
Élysées–La Défense	Paris Metro Line 1	outside the network	never opened, foundations built
Haxo	Paris Metro Line 3bis Paris Metro Line 7bis	on unused connecting branch	never opened, platforms built
Porte Molitor	Paris Metro Line 9 Paris Metro Line 10	on unused connecting branch	never opened, platforms built

=== Merged stations ===
Station	Line(s)	Opening date	Closing date	Note
Martin Nadaud	Paris Metro Line 3	1905-01-25	1969-08-23	station merged with Gambetta; its platforms now serve as an access corridor

== See also ==
- List of Réseau Express Régional stations
- List of Transilien stations
- List of tram stops in Île-de-France
- List of Paris railway stations
