= Picpus =

Picpus may refer to:

- Picpus, Paris, a quarter and administrative area centered on the Rue de Picpus in the 12th arrondissement of Paris, France
  - Picpus station, a station on line 6 of the Paris Metro
  - Picpus Cemetery, a cemetery in Paris
- Picpus Fathers, an order of the Catholic Church, officially the Congregation of the Sacred Hearts of Jesus and Mary, originating from Picpus, Paris
- Picpus (film), a 1943 film by Richard Pottier
