= Pereire–Levallois station =

Railway station in Paris, France

Pereire–Levallois
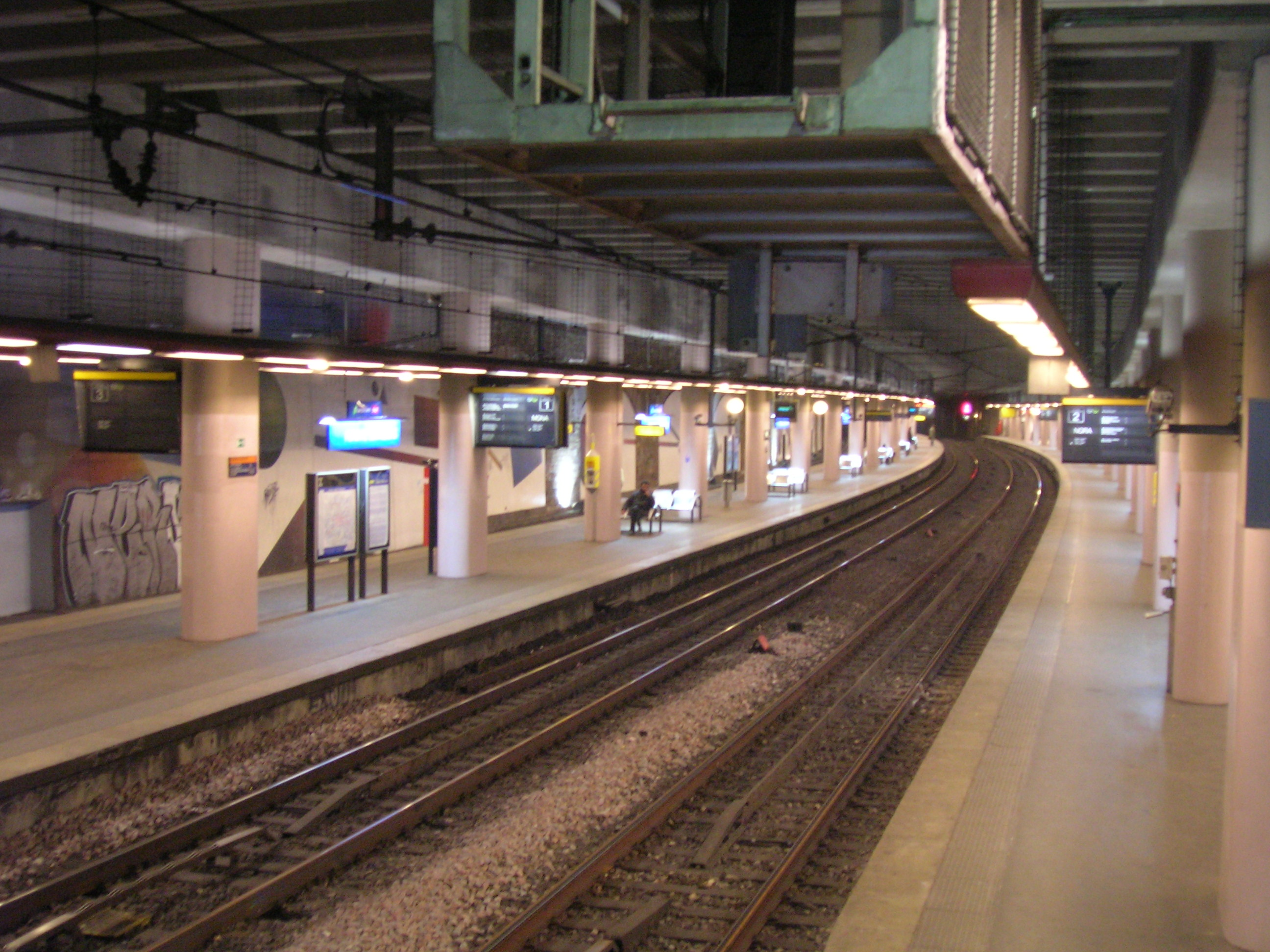
- The station in 2007

General information
- Location: 4 Place du Maréchal-Juin; 17th arrondissement of Paris; France
- Coordinates: 48°53′7″N 2°17′52″E
- System: RER station
- Owner: SNCF
- Operator: SNCF
- Line: RER C
- Platforms: 2
- Tracks: 3
- Bus routes: : 84, 92, 93, PC, 163, 341; : N16, N52, N152
- Bus operators: RATP, Noctilien
Connections
Paris Metro	Line 3 (Pereire)

Other information
- Station code: 87381012
- Fare zone: 1

History
- Opened: 2 May 1854; 172 years ago

Passengers
- 2024: 4,364,923

Services
Preceding station	RER	Following station
Porte de Clichy towards Pontoise	RER C	Neuilly–Porte Maillot towards Massy-Palaiseau or Dourdan-la-Forêt
Location

Pereire–Levallois is a station in Paris's express suburban rail system, the RER. It is in the 17th arrondissement of Paris, and was a part of the Petite Ceinture railway.

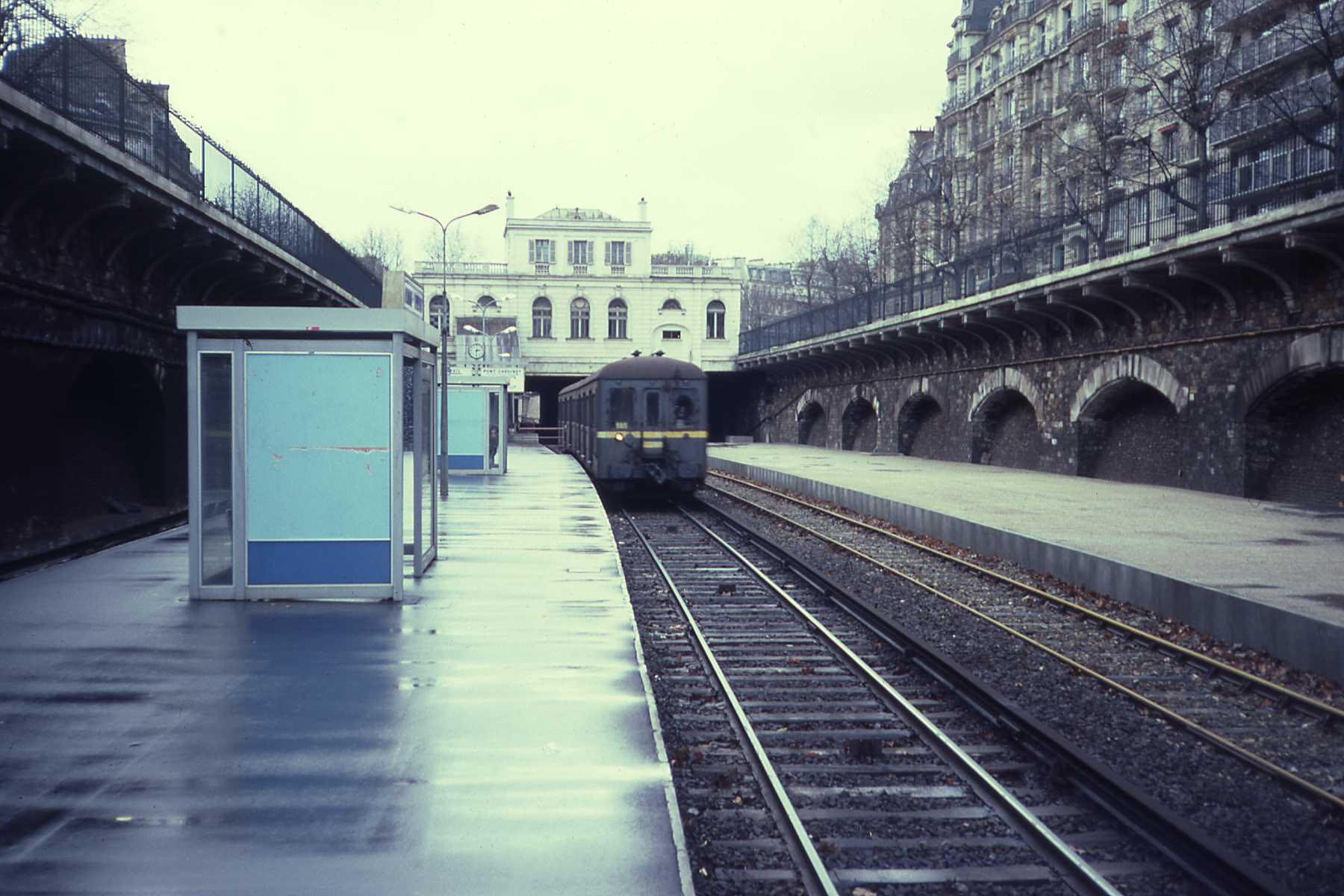
The station in 1984

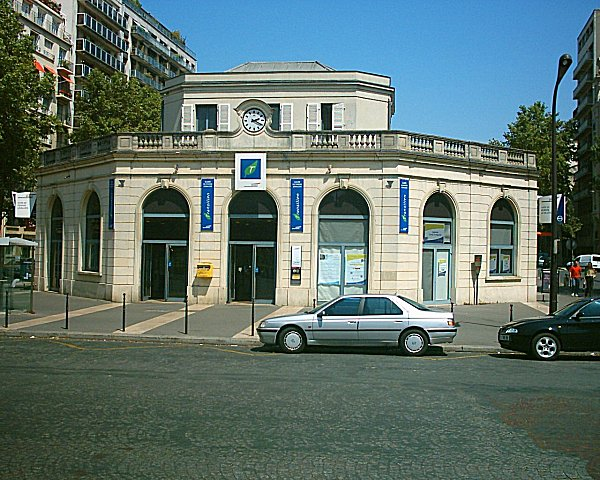
Entrance

== Adjacent station ==
- Pereire on Paris Métro Line 3.
- Shuttle buses connect Pont Cardinet on SNCF rail station.

== See also ==
- List of stations of the Paris RER
- List of stations of the Paris Métro
