= Wagram station =

Metro station in Paris, France

Wagram
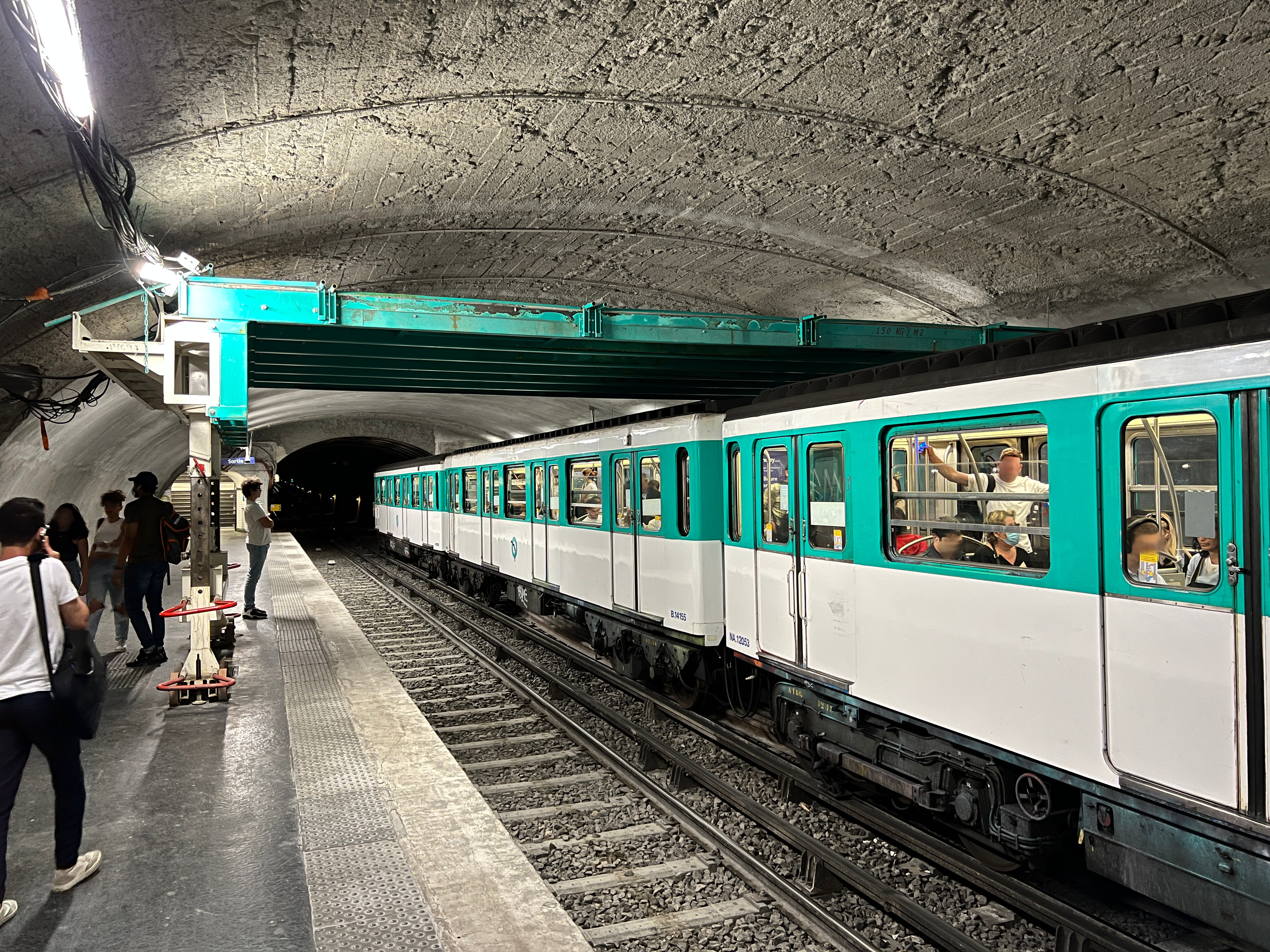
- Station platforms during refurbishment works in 2022

General information
- Location: 74, Av. de Villiers; Place Mgr. Loutil; 17th arrondissement of Paris; Île-de-France; France
- Coordinates: 48°53′03″N 2°18′13″E
- Owner: RATP
- Operator: RATP

Other information
- Fare zone: 1

History
- Opened: 23 May 1910

Services
Preceding station	Paris Metro	Following station
Pereire towards Pont de Levallois–Bécon	Line 3	Malesherbes towards Gallieni
Location
- Location within Paris

Wagram (French pronunciation: [vaɡʁam]) is a station on Line 3 of the Paris Métro located in the 17th arrondissement of Paris. Alphabetically, the station is the last on the Paris Métro system.

== Location ==
The station is located under Avenue de Villiers, between Avenue de Wagram and Rue Jouffroy-d'Abbans. Oriented approximately along an east–west axis, it lies between Pereire and Malesherbes stations.

== History ==
Wagram was opened on 23 May 1910 when the line was extended from Villiers to Pereire. The station is named after the Avenue de Wagram, which was named after the Battle of Wagram, where Napoléon Bonaparte defeated the Archduke Charles of Austria in 1809 in the Austrian town of Deutsch-Wagram near Vienna.

From the 1960s, the platforms walls were modernized with the installation of a metallic bodywork with blue painted surrounds. This technique is then widely used in the network stopping points as an inexpensive way to modernize them quickly.

As part of the RATP's Renouveau du métro program, the station's corridors were renovated in the course of the 2000s.

In 2018, 2,565,333 travelers entered this station.

== Passenger services ==
=== Access ===
The station has two entrances:

- Entrance 1: Place Monseigneur-Loutil, consisting of a fixed staircase adorned with a Guimard entrance registered as a historic monument (decree of 12 February 2016), leading to the corner formed by Rue Brémontier (at No. 72) and Avenue de Villiers (near No. 1);
- Entrance 2: Avenue de Villiers, consisting of an escalator allowing only an exit from the platform in the direction of Pont de Levallois – Bécon, located opposite no. 74 of this avenue.

=== Station layout ===
Street Level

B1	Mezzanine Escalator from platform to street

Line 3 platforms	Side platform, doors will open on the right
Line 3 platforms	Westbound	← toward Pont de Levallois–Bécon (Pereire)
Line 3 platforms	Eastbound	toward Gallieni (Malesherbes) →
Line 3 platforms	Side platform, doors will open on the right

=== Platforms ===
Wagram is a standard configuration station. It has two platforms separated by the metro tracks and the arch is elliptical. Since the 1950s, the walls have been cladded in metal bodywork with blue horizontal uprights and golden, illuminated advertising frames, complemented by blue Motte style seats. The bevelled white ceramic tiles cover the side walls, the tunnel exits and the outlets of the corridors. The vault is painted white, and lighting is provided by independent fluorescent tubes. The name of the station is written in Parisine font on enamelled plates incorporated into the bodywork.

=== Bus connections ===
The station is served by lines 31 and 93 of the RATP Bus Network, as well as, at night, by lines N16 and N52 of the Noctilien network.

== Nearby ==
- Église Saint-François-de-Sales de Paris

== Gallery ==
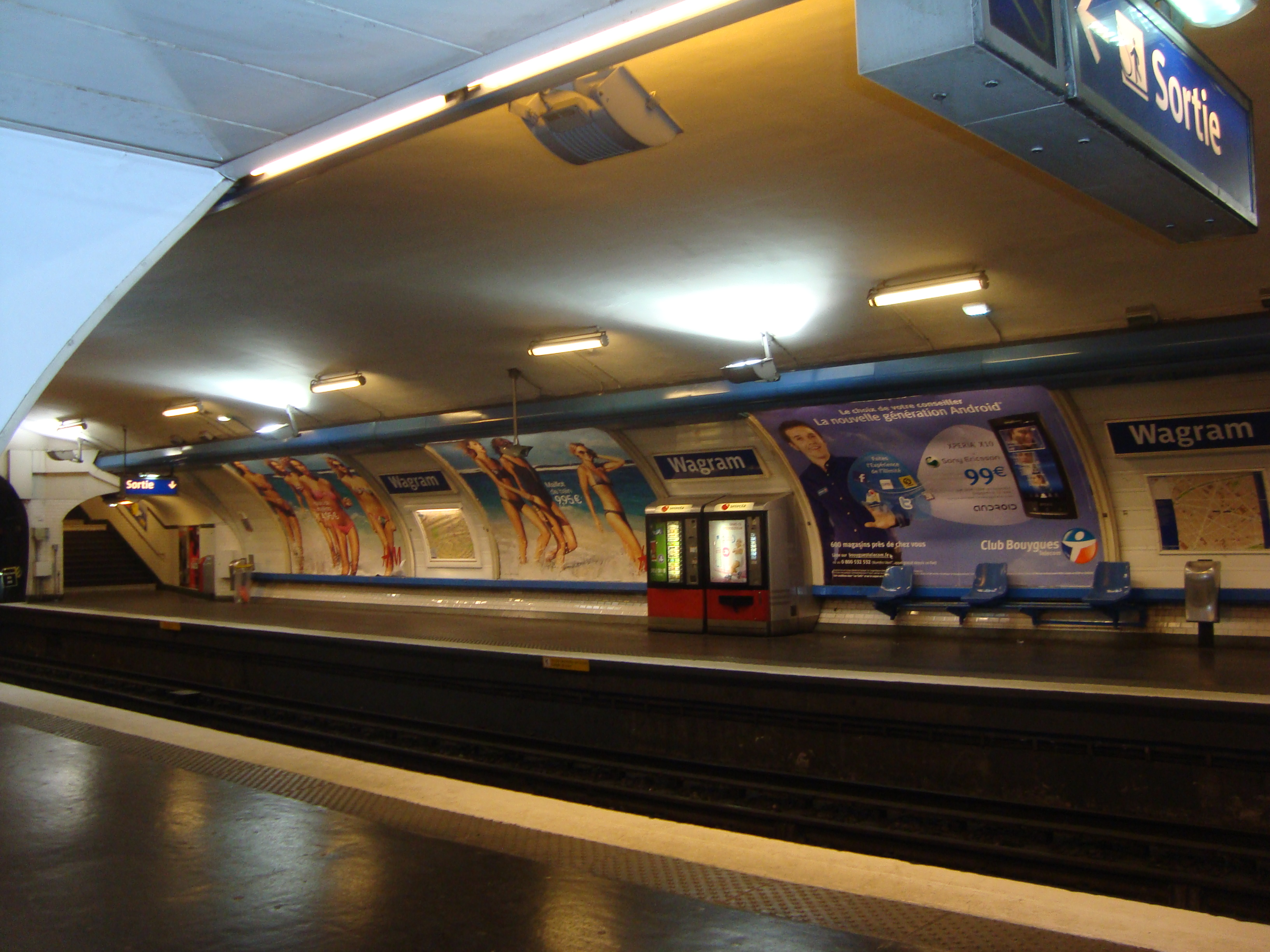
Line 3 platforms at Wagram

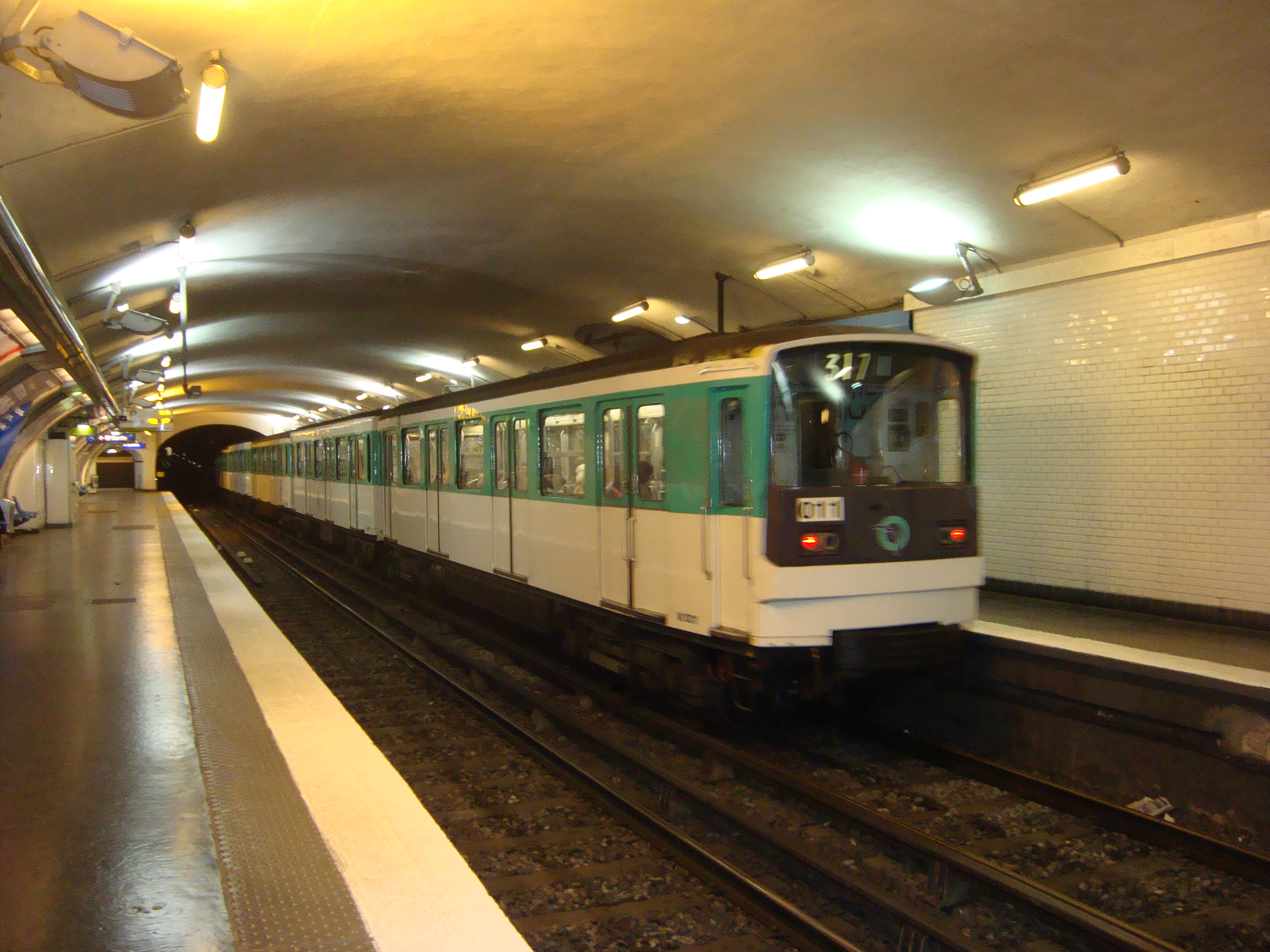
MF 67 rolling stock on Line 3 at Wagram
