= Malesherbes station (Paris Metro) =

Metro station in Paris, France

Malesherbes
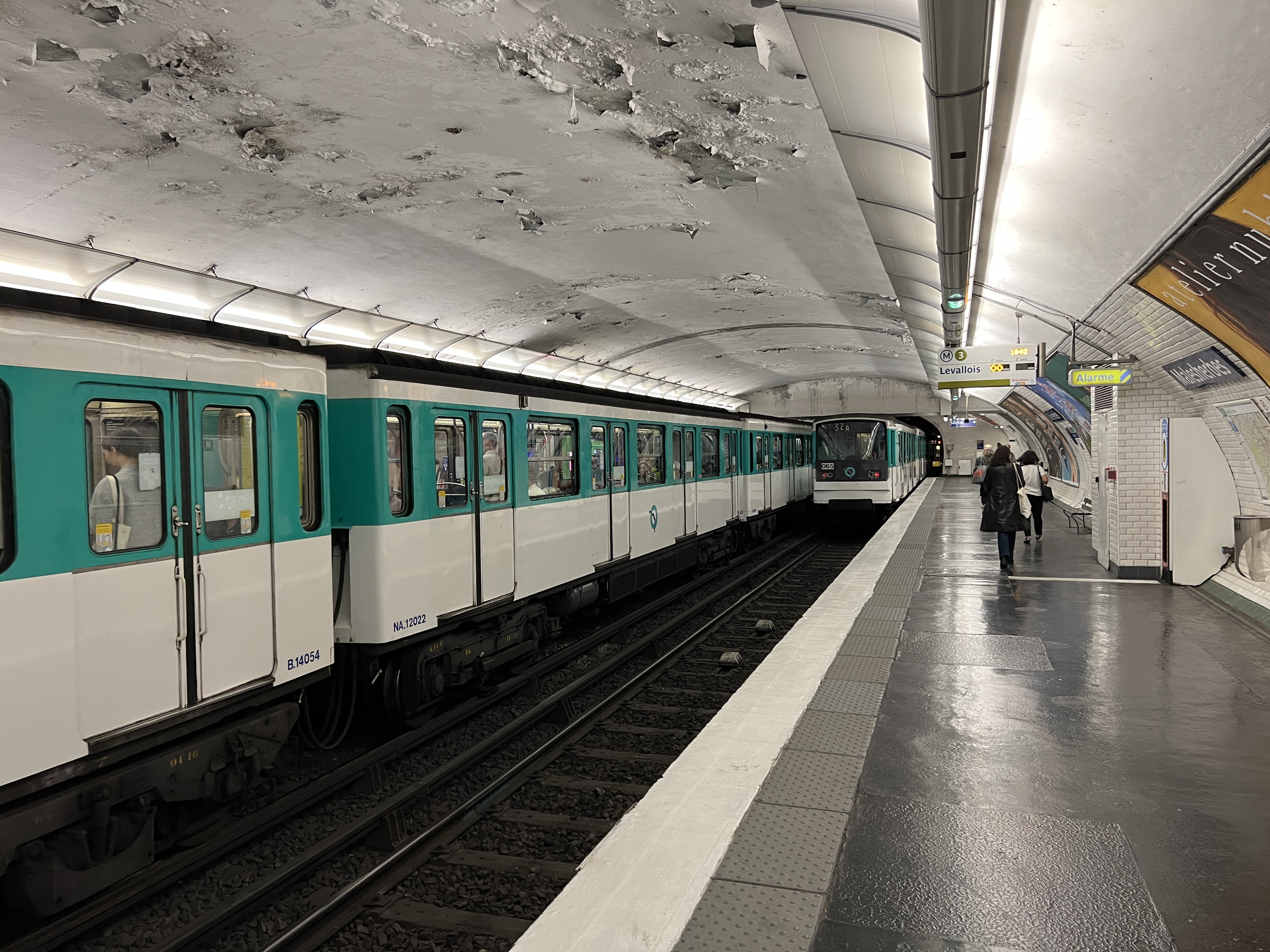

General information
- Location: 48, Av. de Villiers; Place Gral. Catroux; 17th arrondissement of Paris; Île-de-France; France
- Coordinates: 48°52′57″N 2°18′40″E
- Owner: RATP
- Operator: RATP

Other information
- Fare zone: 1

History
- Opened: 15 February 1911

Services
Preceding station	Paris Metro	Following station
Wagram towards Pont de Levallois–Bécon	Line 3	Villiers towards Gallieni
Location
- Location within Paris

Malesherbes (French pronunciation: [malzɛʁb]) is a station on Line 3 of the Paris Métro. It is located in the 17th arrondissement of Paris.

== Location ==
The station is located under Place du Général-Catroux, along the axis of Avenue de Villiers, west of its intersection with Boulevard Malesherbes. Approximately oriented along an east–west axis, it is located between Wagram and Villiers stations.

== History ==
Malesherbes was opened on 23 May 1910 when the line was extended from Villiers to Pereire. The station is named after the Boulevard Malesherbes, which honours the statesman Guillaume-Chrétien de Lamoignon de Malesherbes, who was guillotined during the Reign of Terror in 1794.

As part of the RATP Renouveau du métro program, the station corridors and platform lighting were renovated in the 2000s.

In 2018, it saw 2,628,908 travelers enter the station, which placed it in the 212th position out 302 metro stations for its traffic.

== Passenger services ==
=== Access ===
The station has two entrances:

- Entrance 1: "Place du Général-Catroux", consisting of a fixed staircase, leading to the right of no. 15 of this place;
- Entrance 2: "Avenue de Villiers", consisting of an escalator allowing only an exit, located opposite no. 40 of this avenue.

=== Station layout ===
Street Level

B1	Mezzanine

Line 3 platforms	Side platform, doors will open on the right
Line 3 platforms	Westbound	← toward Pont de Levallois–Bécon (Wagram)
Line 3 platforms	Eastbound	toward Gallieni (Villiers) →
Line 3 platforms	Side platform, doors will open on the right

=== Platforms ===
Malesherbes is a standard configuration station. It has two platforms separated by the metro tracks and the vault is elliptical. The decoration is in the style used for most metro stations, the lighting strips are white and rounded in the Gaudin style of the metro revival in the 2000s, and the bevelled white ceramic tiles cover the pillars, the tunnel exits as well as the outlets of the corridors, while the vault is painted white. The advertising frames are metallic, and the name of the station is written in Parisine font on enamelled plates. The platforms are equipped with benches made of wooden slats painted dark green.

=== Bus connections ===
The station is served by lines 20, 93 of the RATP Bus Network, and, at night, by lines N16 and N52 of the Noctilien network.

== Nearby ==
- Paris-Sorbonne University (Boulevard Malesherbes site)
- Lycée Carnot
