= Europe station (Paris Metro) =

Metro station in Paris, France

Europe Simone Veil
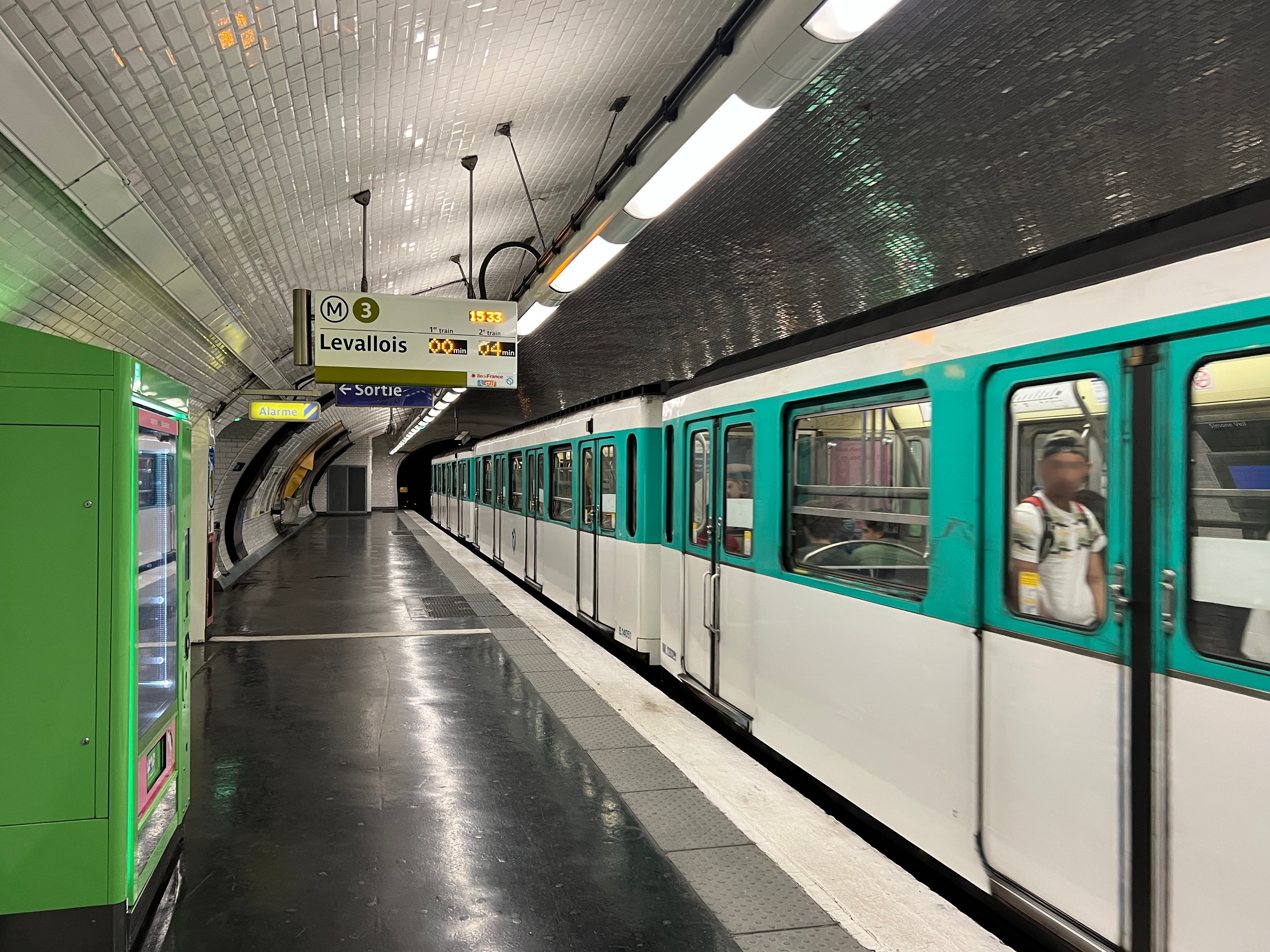

General information
- Location: 1, Rue de Madrid; 8th arrondissement of Paris; Île-de-France; France
- Coordinates: 48°52′44″N 2°19′21″E
- System: Paris Metro station
- Owner: RATP
- Operator: RATP
- Line: Paris Metro Paris Metro Line 3
- Platforms: 2 (side platforms)
- Tracks: 2

Construction
- Accessible: no

Other information
- Fare zone: 1

History
- Opened: 19 October 1904

Services
Preceding station	Paris Metro	Following station
Villiers towards Pont de Levallois–Bécon	Line 3	Saint-Lazare towards Gallieni
Location
- Location within Paris

Europe – Simone Veil (French pronunciation: [øʁɔp simɔn vɛj]) is a station on Line 3 of the Paris Metro located in the 8th arrondissement.

== Location ==
The station is located under the Rue de Rome at its intersection with the Rue de Madrid, west of the Place de l'Europe. Approximately oriented along a north–south axis, it is located between Villiers and Saint-Lazare Metro stations.

== History ==
The station opened on 19 October 1904, nine days after the first section of Line 3 opened between Père Lachaise and Villiers. It is named after the Place de l'Europe, a square from which streets named for various capitals of European countries radiate. This was the site of the first railway station in Paris, known as the embarcadère de l'Ouest ("Western platform"), the temporary terminus of the Compagnie du Chemin de fer de Paris à Saint-Germain, opened in 1837. The new terminus of Gare Saint-Lazare replaced it from 1842.

As part of the RATP's Renouveau du métro renewal program, its corridors were renovated in March 2000. It was one of the stations to have platforms culturally developed for the centenary celebrations of the metro.

On 25 April 2018, the president of the Île-de-France region Valérie Pécresse, announced that the metro station will be named Europe - Simone-Veil, named after the former Minister of Health and first president of the European Parliament, who died on 30 June 2017. The inauguration took place on 29 May 2018; the name of Simone Veil is now displayed as a subtitle on new plates, simultaneously with its attribution in Place de l'Europe on the same date in addition to its original name.

It saw 1,694,103 travelers enter the station in 2018, which places it at the 273rd position of the metro stations for its traffic out of 302.

== Passenger services ==
=== Access ===
The station has a single entrance entitled Rue de Madrid, leading to the right of No. 1 of this street. Consisting of a fixed staircase, it is adorned with a Guimard entrance, which is the subject of a historical monuments decree of 29 May 1978.

=== Station layout ===
Street Level

B1	Mezzanine

Line 3 platforms	Side platform, doors will open on the right
Line 3 platforms	Westbound	← toward Pont de Levallois–Bécon (Villiers)
Line 3 platforms	Eastbound	toward Gallieni (Saint-Lazare) →
Line 3 platforms	Side platform, doors will open on the right

=== Platforms ===
Europe is a standard configuration station. It has two platforms separated by the metro tracks and the vault is elliptical. If its decoration is classic with bevelled white tiles covering the walls, the vault, and the tunnel exits, it has the particularity of being equipped with liquid crystal screens since the celebrations of the centenary of the metro, broadcasting short films or slideshows. Lighting is provided by two tube strips and the platforms are equipped with benches made of wooden slats. The advertising frames are metallic and the name of the station is written in Parisine font on enameleld plates.

=== Bus connections ===
The station is served by Lines 66, 80, 94 and 95 of the RATP bus network and, at night, by Lines N02, N15, N16, N51 and N52 of the Noctilien network.

== Gallery ==
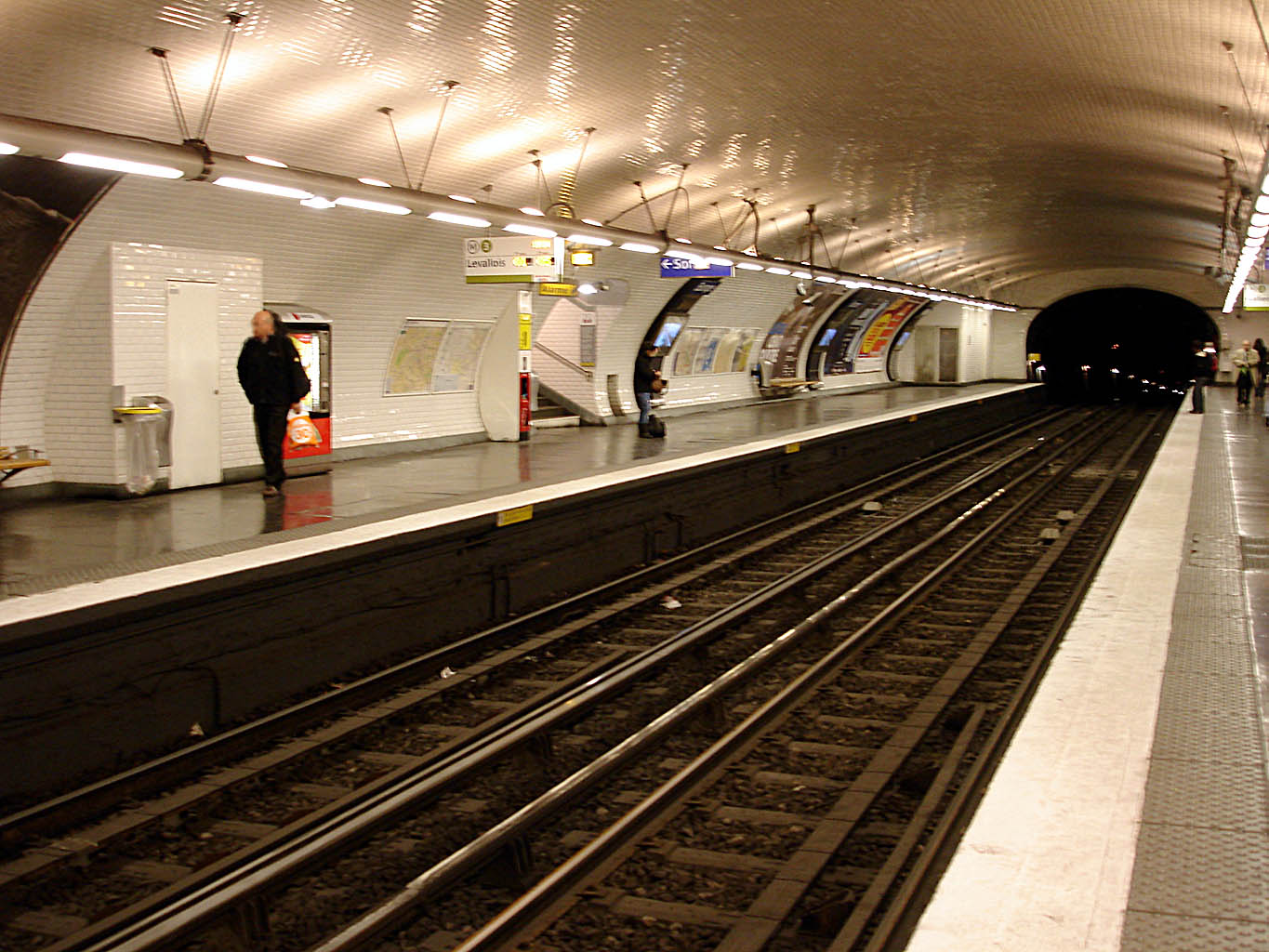
Line 3 platforms at Europe

MF 67 rolling stock on Line 3 at Europe

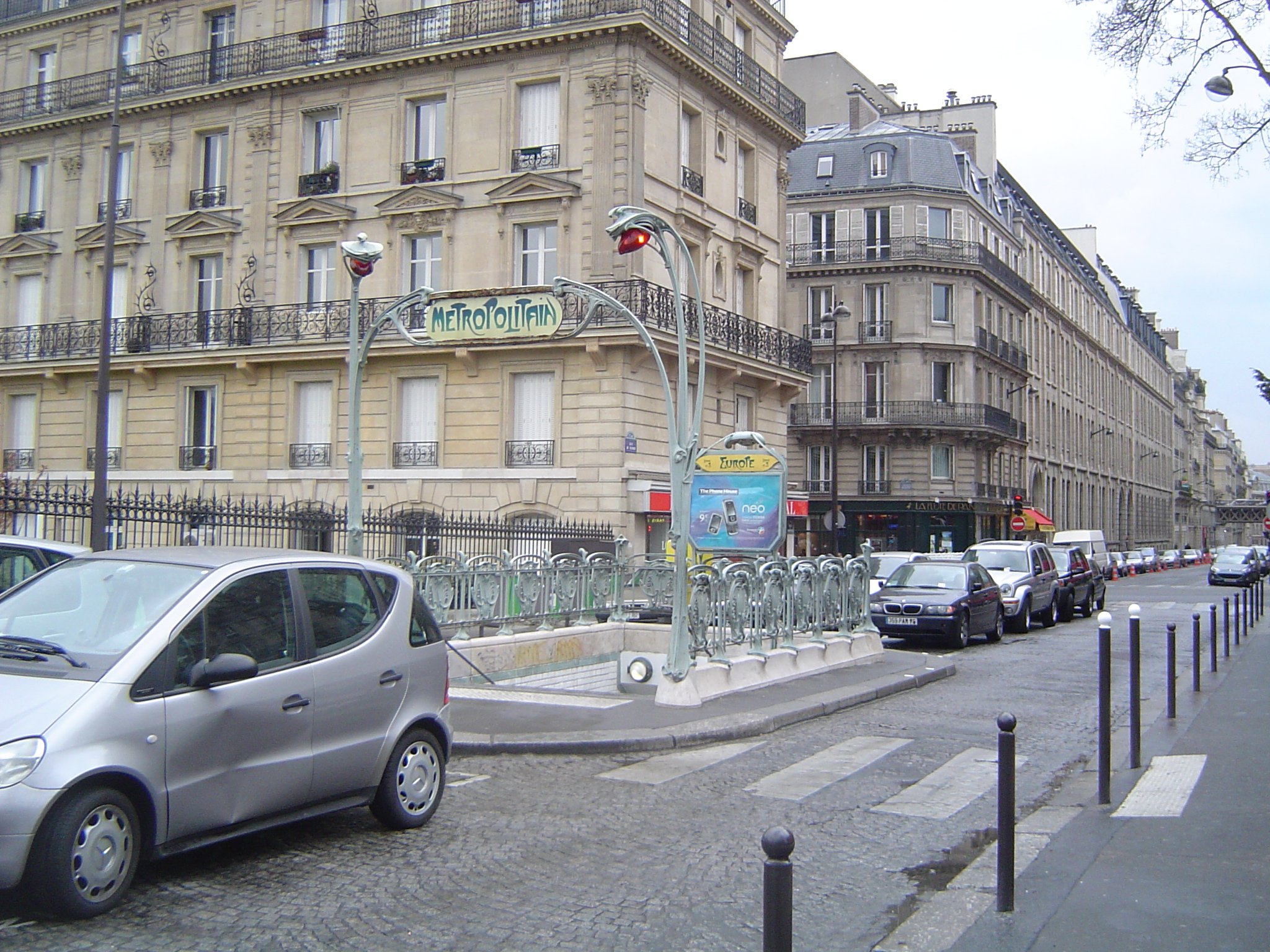
Entrance to station
