= Bel-Air station (Paris Metro) =

Metro station in Paris, France

Bel-Air
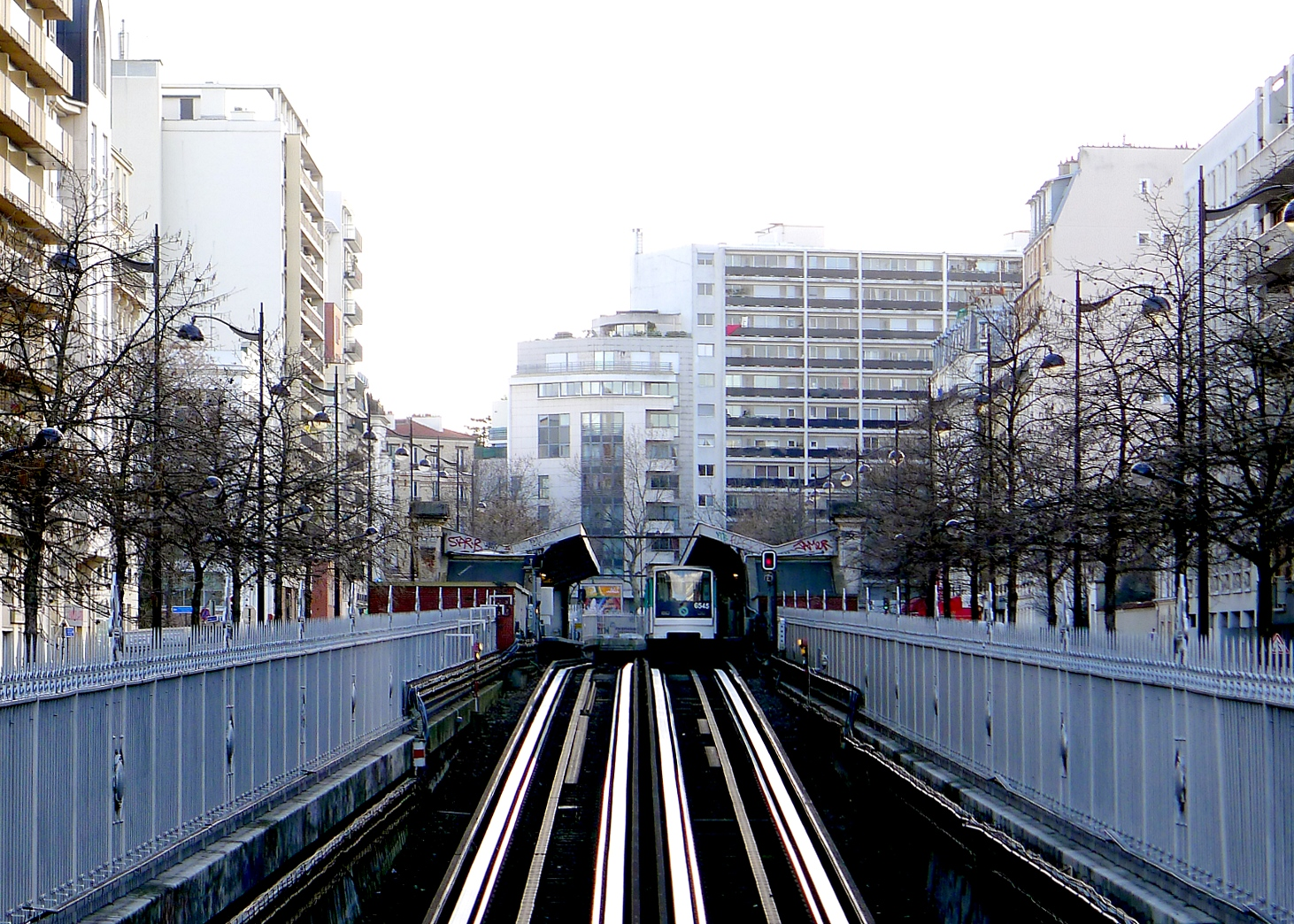

General information
- Location: 12th arrondissement of Paris; Île-de-France; France
- Coordinates: 48°50′29″N 2°24′03″E
- System: Paris Métro station
- Owner: RATP
- Operator: RATP

Other information
- Fare zone: 1

History
- Opened: 1 March 1909

Services
Preceding station	Paris Metro	Following station
Daumesnil towards Charles de Gaulle–Étoile	Line 6	Picpus towards Nation
Location
- Location within Paris

Bel-Air (French pronunciation: [bɛl ɛːʁ]) is a station on Line 6 of the Paris Métro in the 12th arrondissement. The station is located in the middle of the Boulevard de Picpus, between the districts of Picpus and Bel-Air.

== History ==
The station was opened on 1 March 1909 with the extension of the line from Place d'Italie to Nation. The station was closed during World War II and remained closed for a prolonged period, not reopening until 7 January 1963. It is named after the Bel-Air quarter. This station, along with the other elevated stations on the 1909 extension to Nation, were the last above ground stations on the Paris Métro until Créteil–L'Échat station was opened on Line 8 in 1973.

== Passenger services ==
=== Access ===
The station has three accesses located in front of nos. 15, 32 and 34 of Boulevard de Picpus.

=== Station layout ===
Street Level

B1	Mezzanine for platform connection

Platform level	Side platform, doors will open on the right
Platform level	toward Charles de Gaulle–Étoile	← toward Charles de Gaulle–Étoile (Daumesnil)
Platform level	toward Nation	toward Nation (Picpus) →
Platform level	Side platform, doors will open on the right

=== Platforms ===
The station is in the open air at ground level, but the lines are underground to the north and to the south: the trains ascend to the surface before the station to descend when leaving it. This layout was required to clear the railway that connected the former Gare de la Bastille railway station (near the current Bastille metro station) to the valley of the Marne, via the former station of Reuilly near Bel-Air. This line was diverted to become part of RER A in 1969.

The station's single entrance to the station leads to the back of trains from Nation and to the front of trains from Charles de Gaulle–Étoile.

=== Bus connections ===
The station has no connection with the RATP bus network.

== Places of interest ==
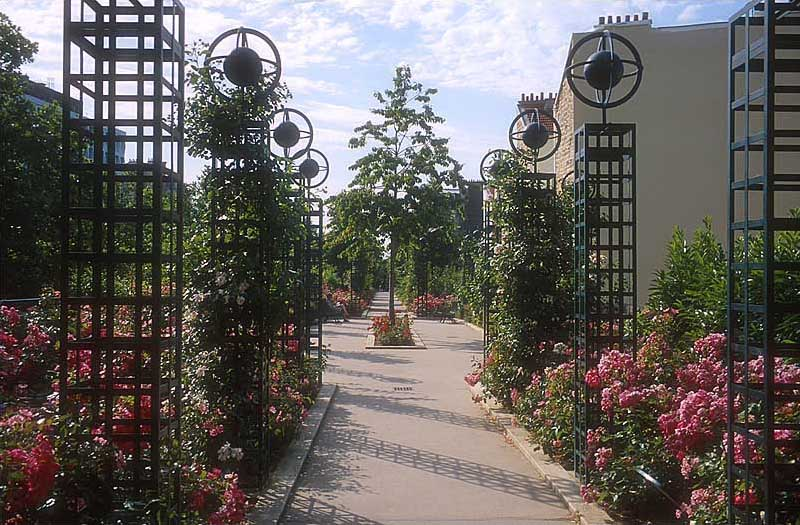
A view of the Promenade Plantée, looking west

The old railway to Paris-Bastille was converted in the 1990s into the Promenade Plantée — a 4.5 km (2.8 mi) long elevated garden connecting to the Bastille to the Porte de Saint-Mandé. Cycling and rollerskating is allowed on this section.

The Rothschild Hospital is in the immediate vicinity and the Armand Trousseau Hospital for children is further off.
