= Pereire station =

Metro station in Paris, France

Pereire
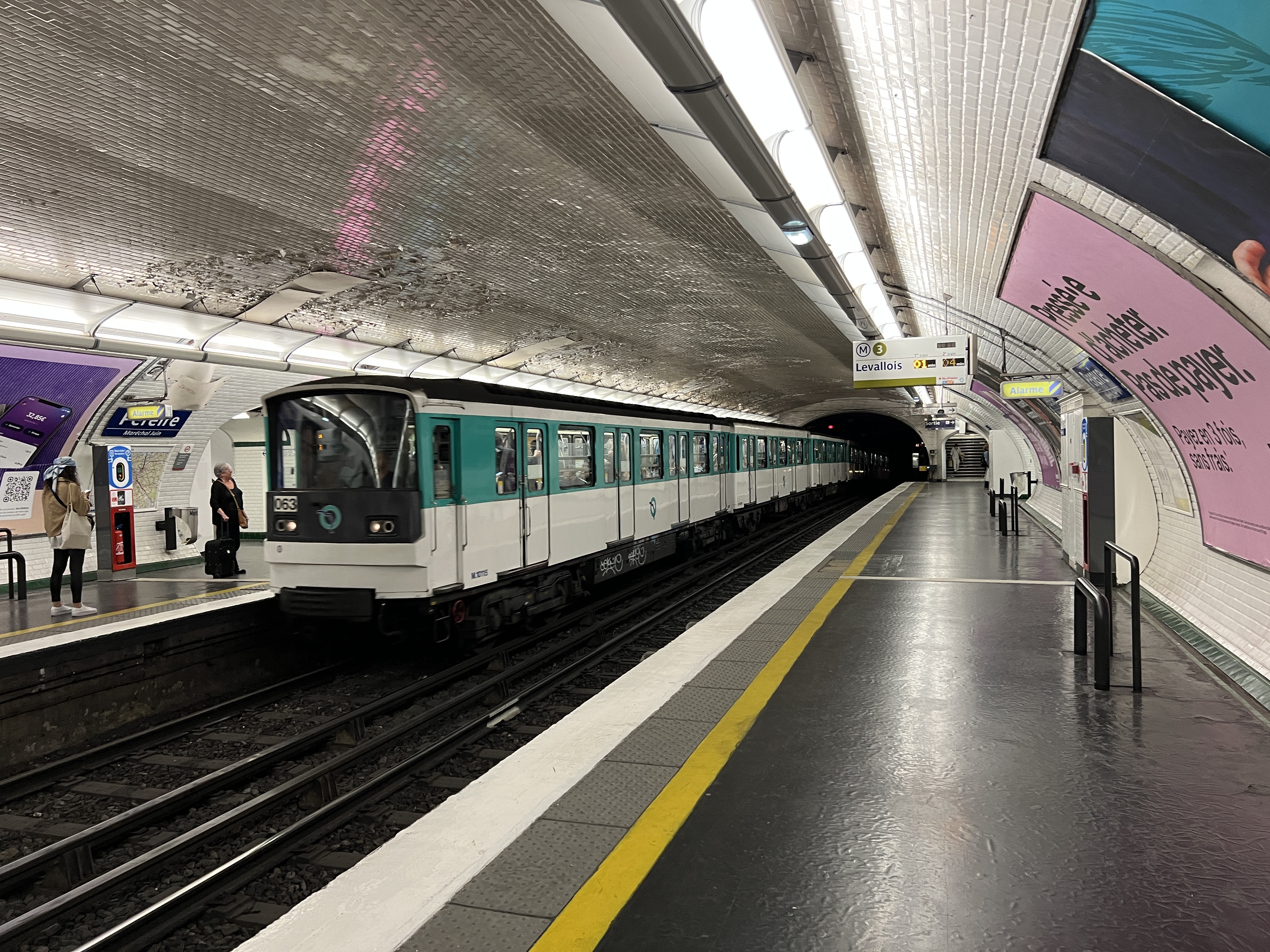

General information
- Other names: Maréchal Juin
- Location: 184, Rue de Courcelles; Square Albert-Besnard; 17th arrondissement of Paris; Île-de-France; France
- Coordinates: 48°53′05″N 2°17′57″E
- Owner: RATP
- Operator: RATP

Other information
- Fare zone: 1

History
- Opened: 23 May 1910

Services
Preceding station	Paris Metro	Following station
Porte de Champerret towards Pont de Levallois–Bécon	Line 3	Wagram towards Gallieni
Connections to other stations
Preceding station	RER	Following station
Porte de Clichy towards Pontoise	RER C transfer at Pereire–Levallois	Neuilly–Porte Maillot towards Massy-Palaiseau or Dourdan-la-Forêt
Location
- Location within Paris

Pereire (Maréchal Juin) (French pronunciation: [peʁɛːʁ maʁeʃal ʒɥɛ̃]) is a station on Line 3 of the Paris Métro located in the 17th arrondissement of Paris.

== Location ==
The station is located under Avenue de Villiers, east of Place du Maréchal-Juin. Oriented approximately along an east–west axis, it is located between the Porte de Champerret and Wagram stations.

== History ==
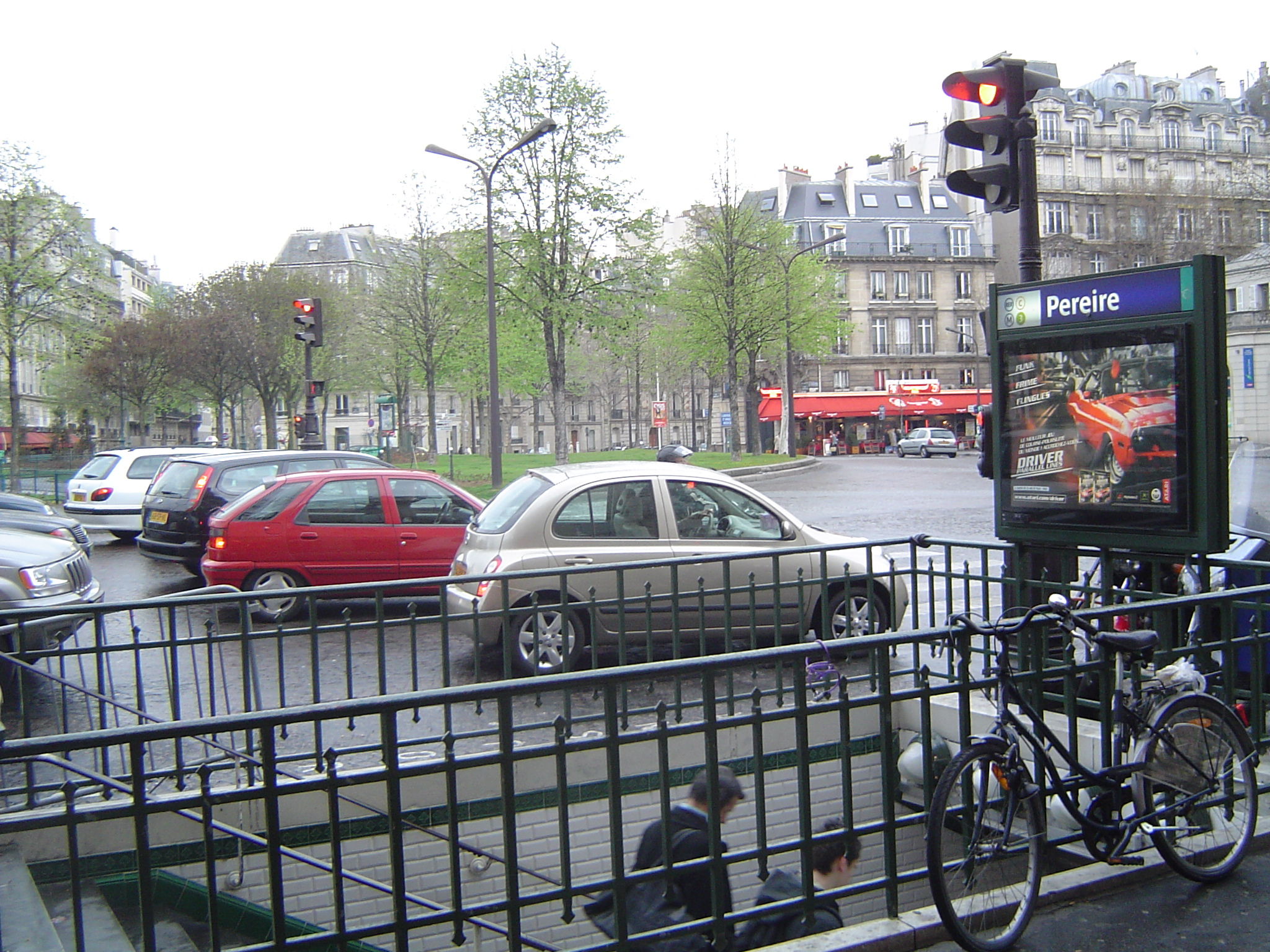
Entrance to Pereire station.

Pereire was opened on 23 May 1910 when the line was extended from Villiers. The station is named after the Boulevard Pereire and the Place du Maréchal Juin by municipal decree of 6 April 1973. The Péreire brothers, Émile Péreire (1800–1875) and his brother Isaac (1806–1880), created the Crédit Mobilier bank in 1852.They established railroad companies in France and in Europe. Émile Péreire was the first director of the Compagnie du Chemin de fer de Paris à Saint-Germain, which opened the first railway in Paris in 1837. He was later in charge of the Auteuil railroad, which later became RER line "C". Marshal Alphonse Juin (1888–1967) was commander of the French forces in Italy in 1943 and 1944.

As part of the RATP Renouveau du métro program, the station corridors and platform lighting were renovated on 5 September 2002.

In 2018, 4,804,340 travelers entered this station which places it at the 99th position of metro stations for its frequency.

== Passenger services ==
=== Access ===
The station has two entrances opening to the south-east of the Place du Maréchal-Juin:

- Entrance 1: Place du Maréchal-Juin located at the right of the square n ° 1;
- Entrance 2: Square Albert-Besnard located on the edge of this square located in the center, facing Rue de Courcelles.

=== Station layout ===
Street Level

B1	Mezzanine

Line 3 platforms	Side platform, doors will open on the right
Line 3 platforms	Westbound	← toward Pont de Levallois–Bécon (Porte de Champerret)
Line 3 platforms	Eastbound	toward Gallieni (Wagram) →
Line 3 platforms	Side platform, doors will open on the right

=== Platform ===
Pereire is a standard configuration station. It has two platforms separated by the metro tracks and the vault is elliptical. The decoration is in the style used for most metro stations. The lighting fittings are white and rounded in the Gaudin style of the metro revival of the 2000s, and the bevelled white ceramic tiles cover the walls, the vault, the tunnel exits and the outlets of the corridors. The advertising frames are metallic, and the name of the station is written in Parisine font on enamelled plates. The docks are fitted with blue sit-stand bars.

=== Bus and other connections ===
The station connects with Pereire-Levallois station on RER line C. It is also served by lines 84, 92, 93 and 341 of the RATP Bus Network, by the Pereire-Pont Cardinet shuttle on the SNCF Transilien bus network and, at night, by lines N16, N52 and N152 of the Noctilien bus network.

== See also ==
- Pereire–Levallois (Paris RER)
