= Picpus station =

Metro station in Paris, France

Picpus
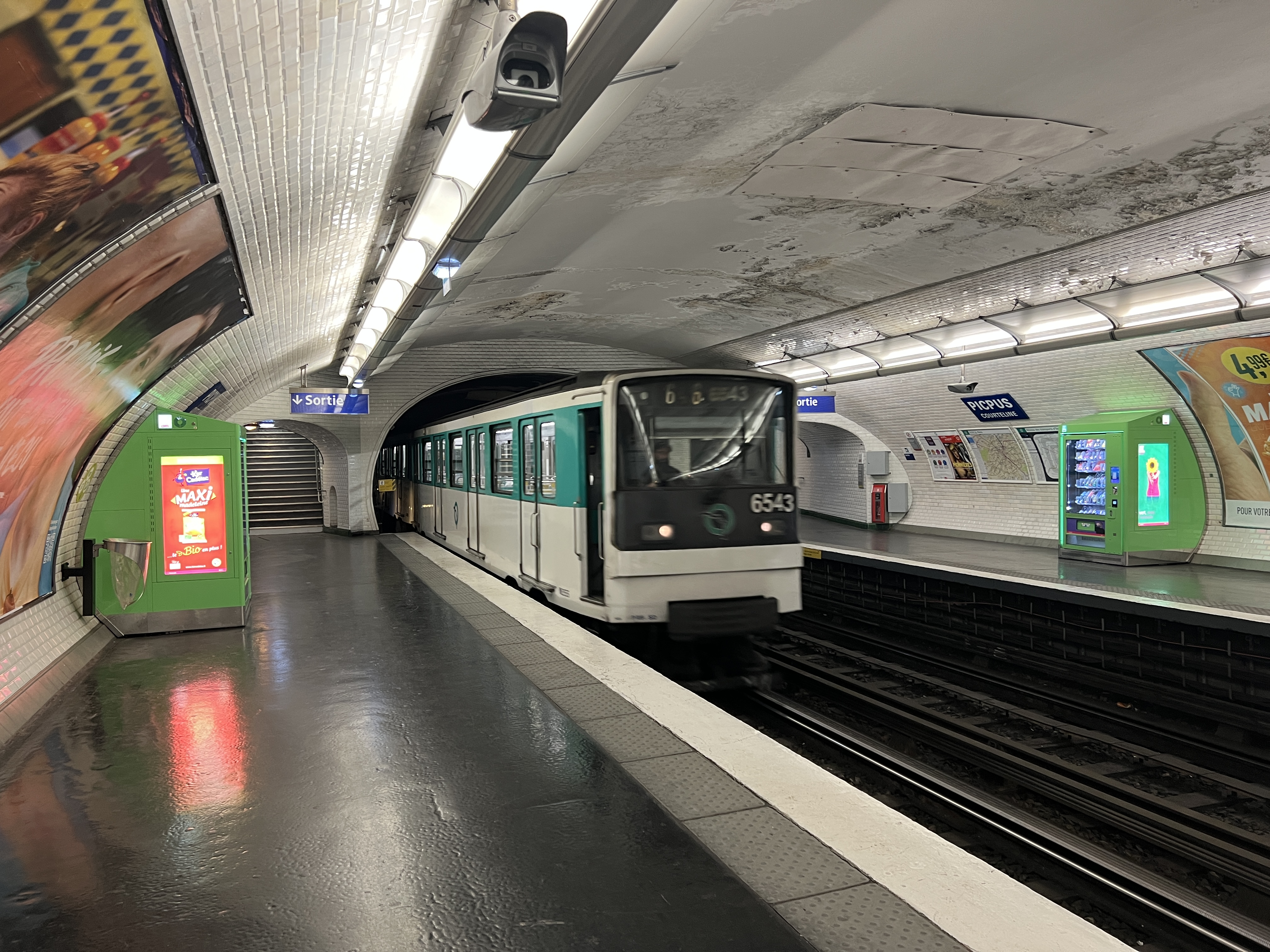

General information
- Location: 12th arrondissement of Paris; Île-de-France; France
- Coordinates: 48°50′43″N 2°24′02″E
- System: Paris Metro station
- Owner: RATP
- Operator: RATP

Other information
- Fare zone: 1

History
- Opened: 1 March 1909
- Former names: Saint-Mandé (1909–1937)

Services
Preceding station	Paris Metro	Following station
Bel-Air towards Charles de Gaulle–Étoile	Line 6	Nation Terminus
Location
- Location within Paris

Picpus (Courteline) (French pronunciation: [pikpys kuʁtəlin]) is a station on Line 6 of the Paris Metro in the 12th arrondissement. The station is located under the Avenue de Saint-Mandé, to the west of the crossroads with the Boulevard de Picpus. There is a single entrance and exit, located on the southern side of the Avenue de Saint-Mandé.

== History ==
The station was opened on 1 March 1909 as Saint-Mandé with the extension of the line from Place d'Italie to Nation. It is named after the district of Picpus and the Boulevard de Picpus. It was renamed Picpus on 1 March 1937 to avoid confusion with Saint-Mandé on Line 1. The station has the additional name of Courteline, after author Georges Courteline (1858–1929). It was the location of the Barrière de Saint-Mandé, a gate built for the collection of taxation as part of the Wall of the Farmers-General; the gate was built between 1784 and 1788 and demolished in the 19th century.

== Passenger services ==
=== Access ===
The station has a single entrance called Avenue de Saint-Mandé, leading to right no. 46 of this avenue. Consisting of a fixed staircase, it is decorated with a Guimard entrance, which is the subject of a registration as a historical monument by a decree of 12 February 2016.

=== Station layout ===
Street Level

B1	Mezzanine for platform connection

Platform level	Side platform, doors will open on the right
Platform level	Westbound	← toward Charles de Gaulle–Étoile (Bel-Air)
Platform level	Eastbound	toward Nation (Terminus) →
Platform level	Side platform, doors will open on the right

=== Platforms ===
Picpus is a station of standard configuration. It has two platforms separated by the metro tracks and the vault is elliptical. The decoration is of the style used for most metro stations. The light canopies are white and rounded in the Gaudin style of the metro revival of the 2000s, and the bevelled white ceramic tiles cover the walls, tunnel exits and corridor outlets. The vault is coated and painted white. The advertising frames are metallic, and the name of the station is inscribed in capital letters on enamelled plaques. The Motte style seats are blue in colour.

=== Bus connections ===
The station is served by lines 29 and 56 of the RATP bus network.

== Places of interest ==
- Square Courteline
- Picpus Cemetery, where, in particular, General La Fayette is buried
- Church of l'Immaculée Conception
