= Villiers station =

Métro station in Paris, France

Villiers
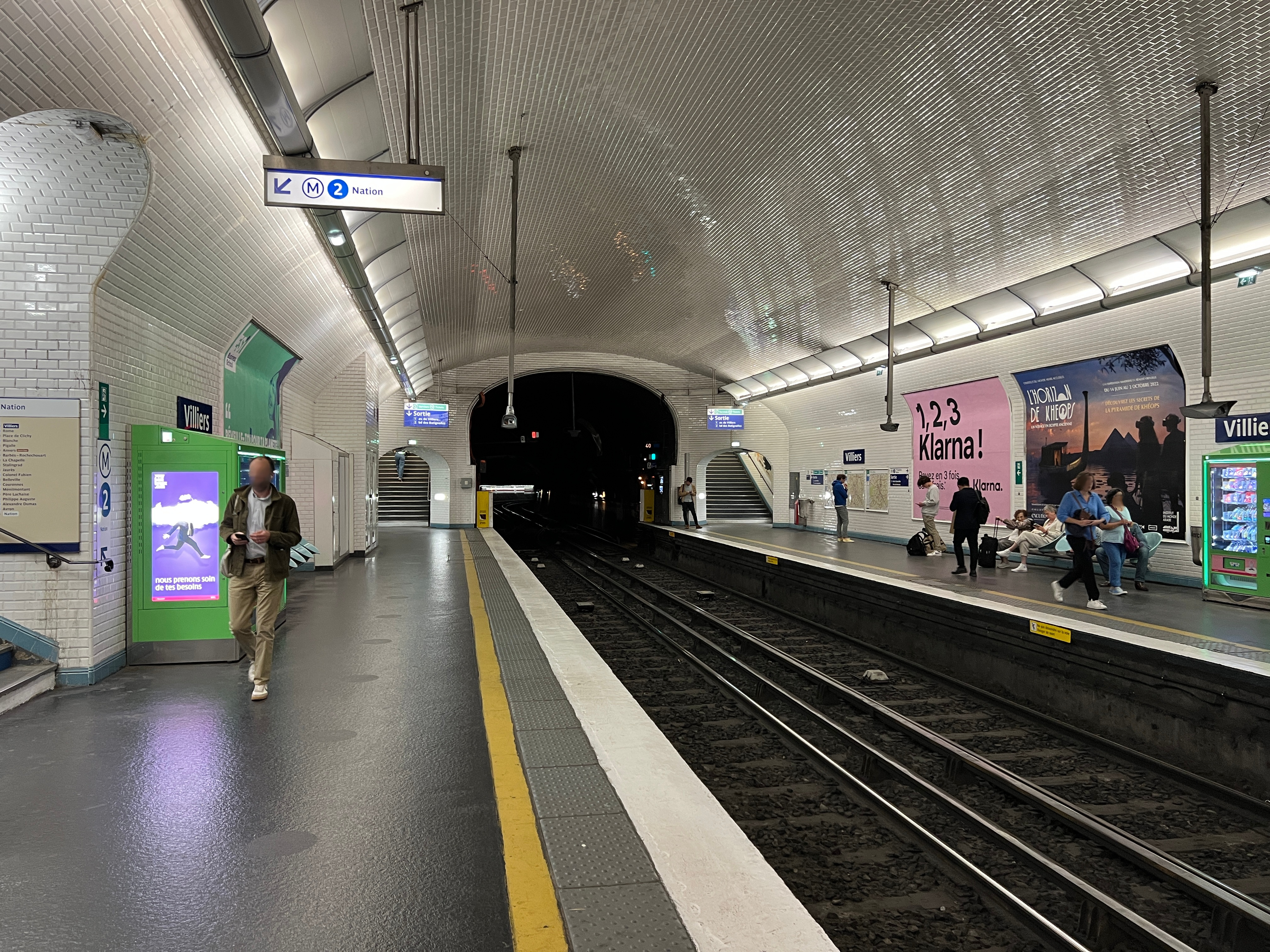
- Line 3 platforms

General information
- Location: 1, Boul. de Courcelles; 2, Boul. de Courcelles; 27, Boul. de Courcelles; 8th and 17th arrondissement of Paris; Île-de-France; France
- Coordinates: 48°52′52″N 2°18′54″E
- Owner: RATP
- Operator: RATP

Other information
- Fare zone: 1

History
- Opened: 21 January 1903 (Line 2); 19 October 1904 (Line 3)

Services
Preceding station	Paris Metro	Following station
Monceau towards Porte Dauphine	Line 2	Rome towards Nation
Malesherbes towards Pont de Levallois–Bécon	Line 3	Europe towards Gallieni
Location
- Location within Paris

Villiers (French pronunciation: [vilje]) is a station on Line 2 and Line 3 of the Paris Métro. It is located on the border of the 8th and 17th arrondissement of Paris.

== Location ==
The station is located under Place Prosper-Goubaux, at the start of Avenue de Villiers. The platforms for the two lines are placed side by side and approximately oriented east–west, along the axis of Boulevard de Courcelles.

== History ==
It is named after the Avenue de Villiers, which once led to the 18th century village of Villiers-la-Garenne, now part of Levallois-Perret. The Barrière de Monceau, a gate built for the collection of taxation as part of the Wall of the Farmers-General was at the same location; the gate was built between 1784 and 1788 and demolished after 1859.

The Line 2 platforms opened on 21 January 1903, although trains had been operating between Étoile and Anvers since 7 October 1902. On 19 October 1904, it became the terminus for the first section of line 3, the other terminus being Père Lachaise. When first built, the platforms for line 3 were parallel and at the same height as those for line 2. However, for the extension to Porte de Champerret, the line 3 platforms and tracks had to be lowered in order for trains to be able to pass underneath the line 2 tracks.

The painter Édouard Vuillard produced a sketch of this station in 1916.

Since the 1950s and until 2008, the pillar of the two stopping areas were covered with metallic body with blue horizontal uprights and illuminated golden advertising frames. This arrangement was then supplemented with shell seats characteristic of the Motte style, blue in color.

As part of the RATP's Metro Renewal program, the station's corridors were renovated on 27 May 2005, then its platforms in 2009, leading to the removal of their bodywork.

It saw 6,237,308 travelers enter in the station 2018, which places it at the 60th position of the metro stations for its frequency.

== Passenger services ==
=== Access ===
The station has three entrances:

- Access 1: Avenue de Villiers: a fixed staircase decorated with a mast with a yellow "M" inscribed in a circle, leading to the right of no. 2 Boulevard de Courcelles, at the corner with Avenue de Villiers;
- Access 2: Boulevard des Batignolles: an escalator going up allowing only an exit, situated in front of no. 5 of Boulevard de Courcelles;
- Access 3: Boulevard de Courcelles - Parc de Monceau: a fixed staircase decorated with a Guimard entrance listed as a historic monument by a decree on 29 May 1978, located at the right of nos. 25 and 27 of the same boulevard.

=== Station layout ===
The station has three exits.

Street Level

B1	Mezzanine for platform connection

Line 2 platforms	Side platform, doors will open on the right
Line 2 platforms	Westbound	← toward Porte Dauphine (Monceau)
Line 2 platforms	Eastbound	toward Nation (Rome) →
Line 2 platforms	Side platform, doors will open on the right

Line 3 platforms	Side platform, doors will open on the right
Line 3 platforms	Westbound	← toward Pont de Levallois–Bécon (Malesherbes)
Line 3 platforms	Eastbound	toward Gallieni (Europe) →
Line 3 platforms	Side platform, doors will open on the right

=== Platforms ===
The platforms of the two lines are of standard configuration. Two in number per stopping point, they are separated by the metro tracks located in the center and the vault is elliptical. The station on line 3, however, has a ceiling height much higher than normal (see above) and vertical walls as a result. The decoration is of the style used for most metro stations in both cases: the lighting strips are white and rounded in the Gaudin style for the metro revival in the 2000s, and the bevelled white ceramic tiles cover the walls, tunnel exits, vault and openings in the corridors. The advertising frames are in white ceramic and the name of the station is written in Parisine font on enameled plates. The seats are Akiko style, blue on line 2 and cyan on line 3.

=== Bus connections ===
The station is served by line 30 of the RATP Bus Network and is approximately 200 meters from the Malesherbes-Courcelles stop located on Boulevard Malesherbes, served by lines 20 and 93 of the same network. At night, it is served by lines N16 and N52 of the Noctilien network.

== Gallery ==
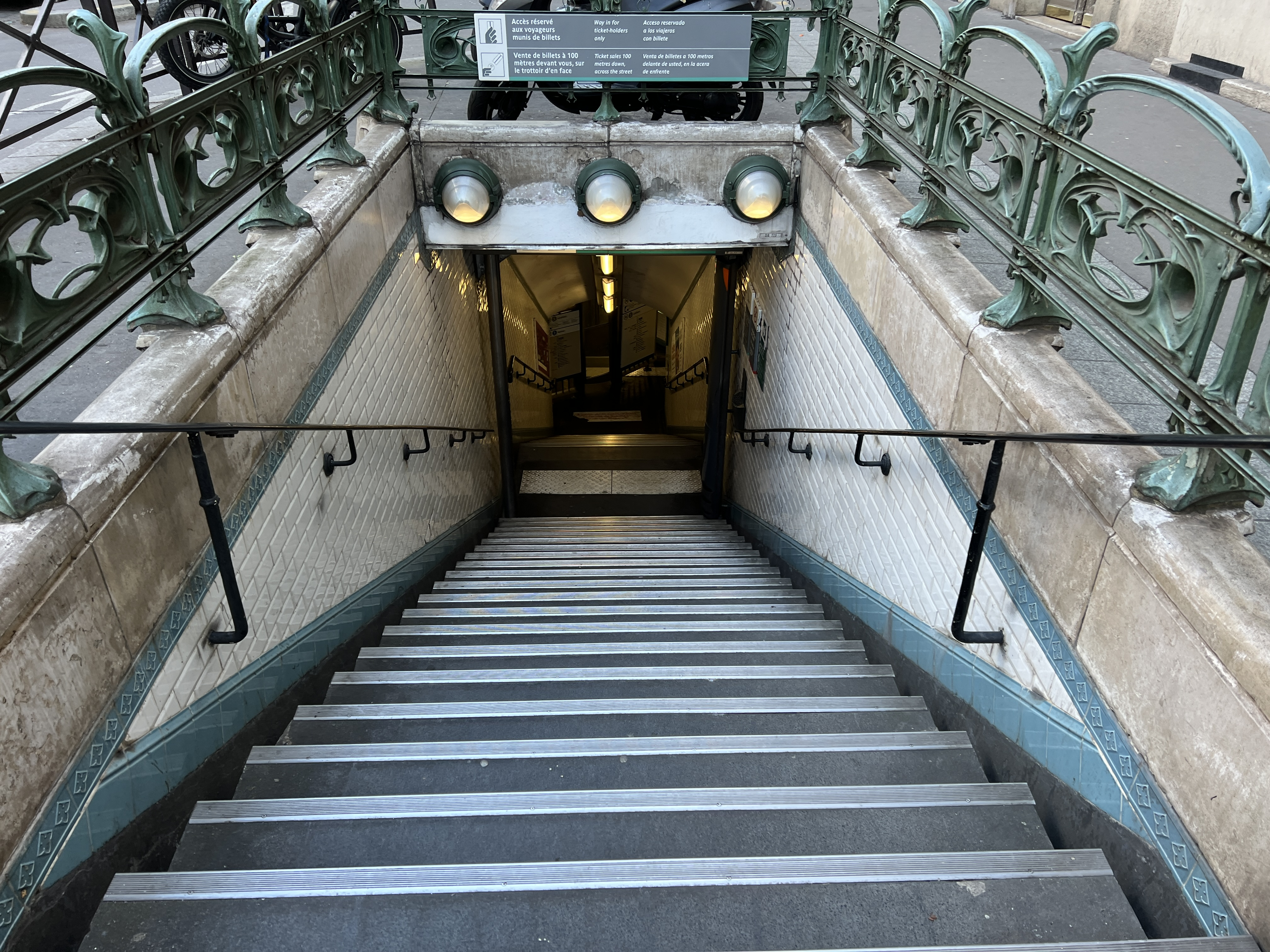
Street-level entrance at Villiers

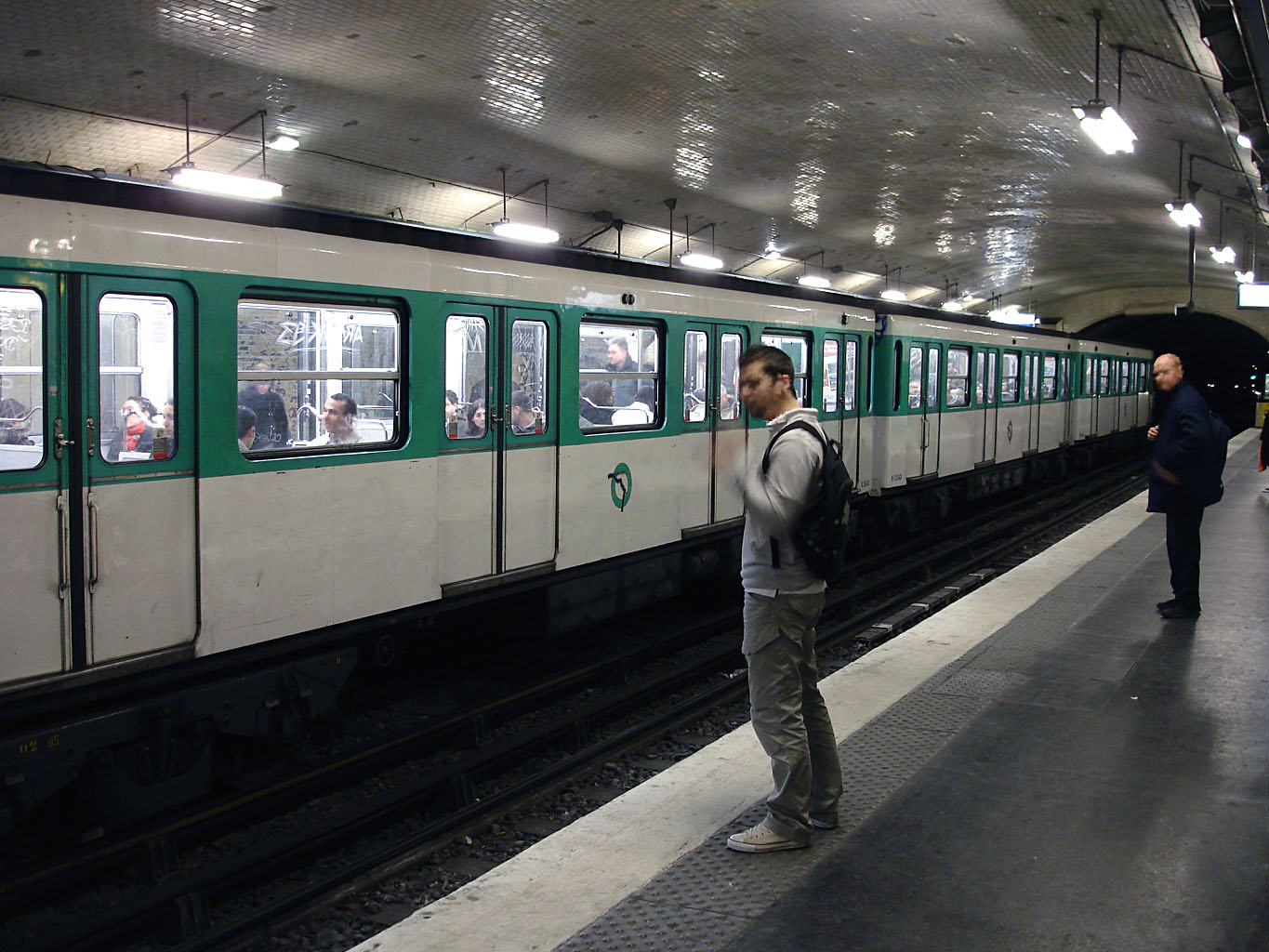
Line 2: MF 67 rolling stock at Villiers

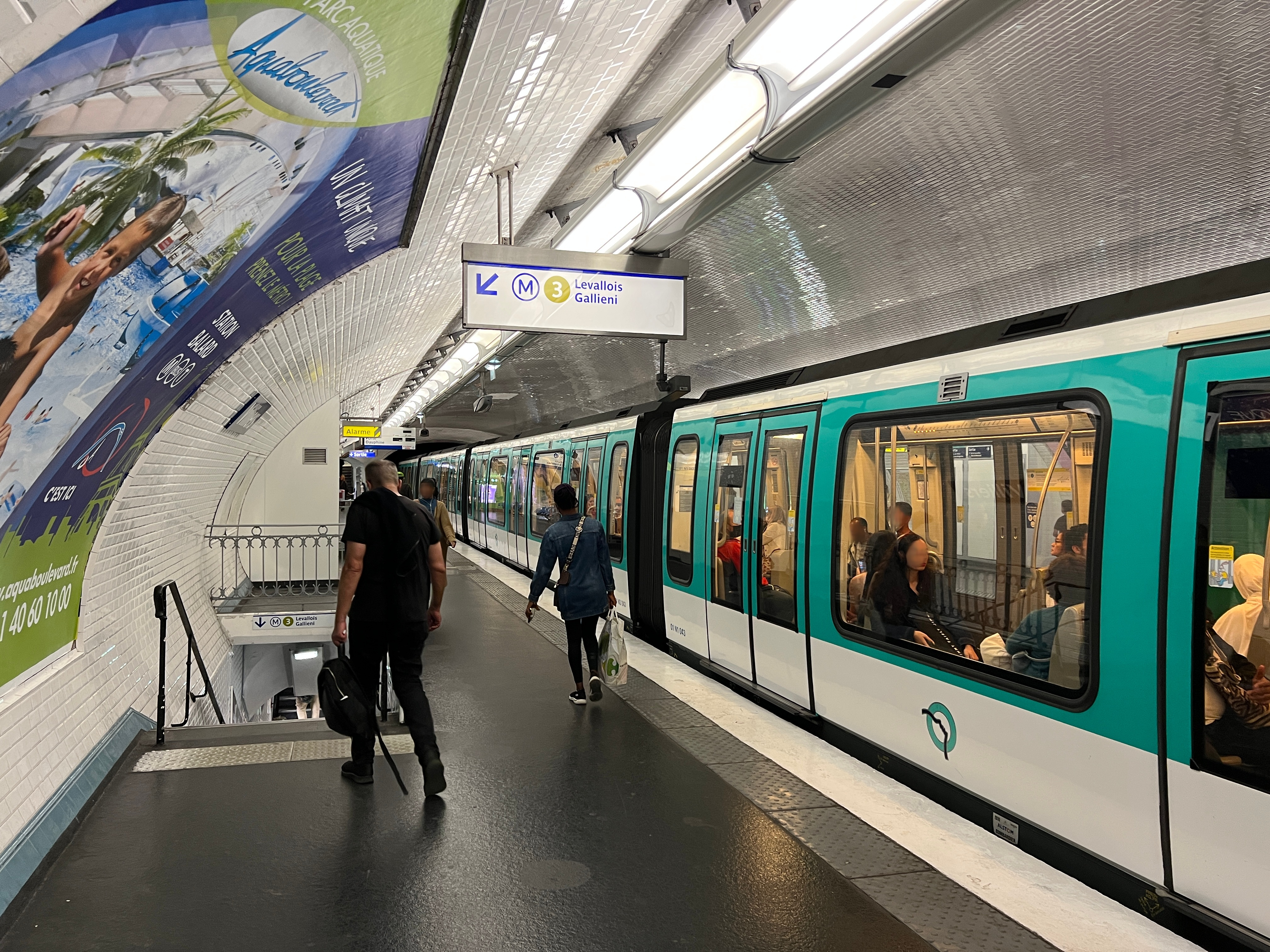
MF 01 rolling stock at Villiers
