= Philippe Auguste station =

Métro station in Paris, France

Philippe Auguste
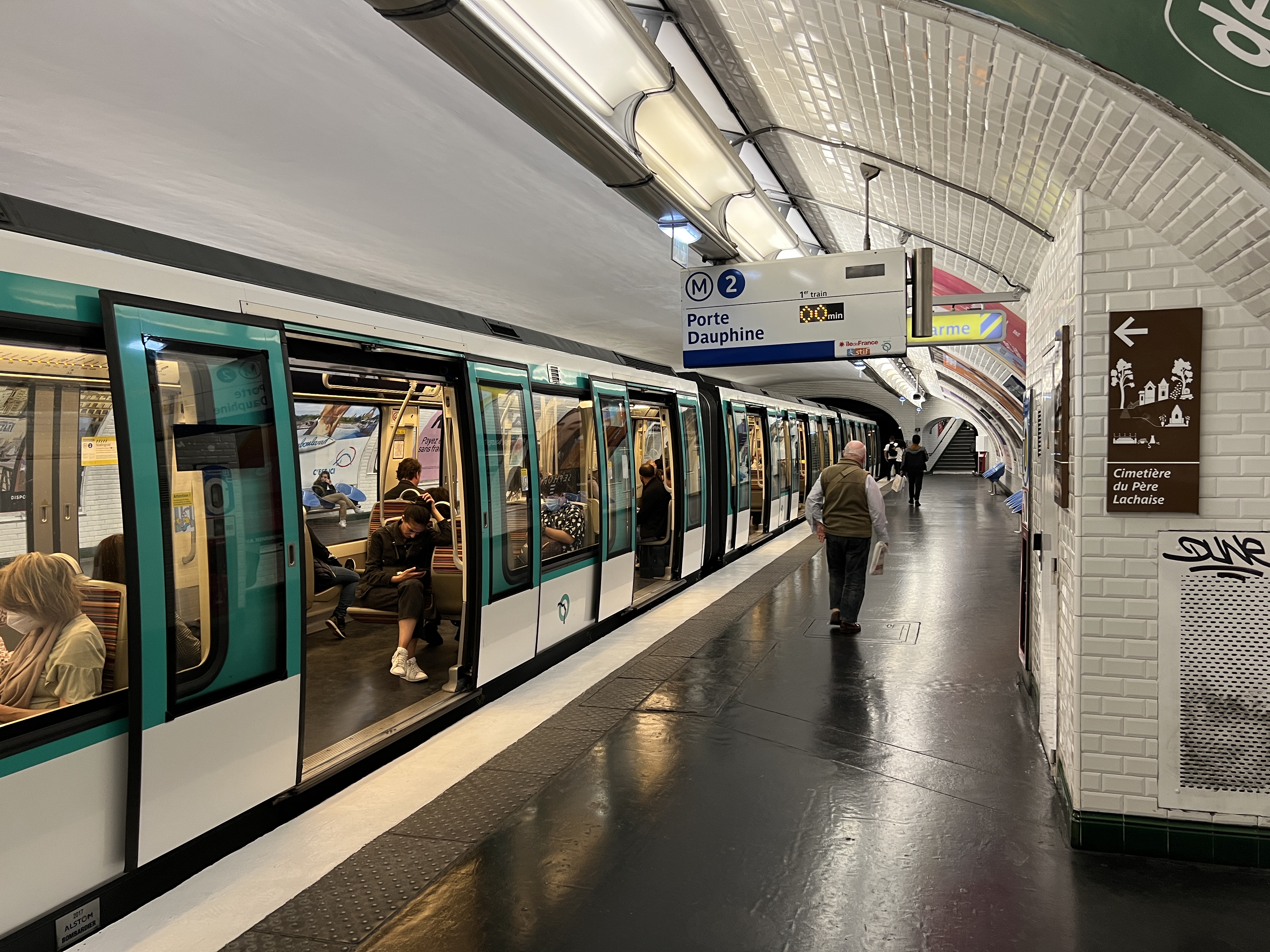

General information
- Location: 212, Boul. de Charonne; 19, Rue de Mont-Louis; 11th arrondissement of Paris; Île-de-France; France
- Coordinates: 48°51′29″N 2°23′27″E
- Owner: RATP
- Operator: RATP
- Line: Paris Metro Paris Metro Line 2
- Platforms: 2 (side platforms)
- Tracks: 2

Construction
- Accessible: no

Other information
- Fare zone: 1

History
- Opened: 31 January 1903

Services
Preceding station	Paris Metro	Following station
Père Lachaise towards Porte Dauphine	Line 2	Alexandre Dumas towards Nation
Route map
Location
- Location within Paris

Philippe Auguste (French pronunciation: [filip oɡyst]) is a station on Line 2 of the Paris Métro, on the border of the 11th and 20th arrondissements.

== Location ==
The station is located at the end of Boulevard de Charonne at its junction with Boulevard de Ménilmontant, at the end of Avenue Philippe-Auguste. Oriented along a north-west/south-east axis, it is located between Père Lachaise and Alexandre Dumas stations.

== History ==
The station was opened on 31 January 1903 as part of the extension of line 2 (known at the time as "2 Nord") from Anvers to Bagnolet (now called Alexandre Dumas). The station is named after the Avenue Philippe Auguste, after King Philip II of France, making it the only station in Paris named for French royalty. It was the location of the Barrière des Rats, a gate built for the collection of taxation as part of the Wall of the Farmers-General; the gate was built between 1784 and 1788 and demolished in 1840.

As part of the RATP Metro Renewal program, the station corridors and platform lighting were renovated on 27 June 2003.

In 2018, the platforms were in turn completely modernized as part of the Un métro + beau operation.

In 2019, 1,763,562 travelers entered this station which placed it at the 262nd position of the metro stations for its traffic out of 302.

== Passenger services ==
=== Access ===
The station has two entrances made up of fixed stairs, opening at the corner of Avenue Philippe-Auguste and Boulevard de Charonne:

- Entrance 1: Boulevard de Charonne: main entrance on the central reservation of Boulevard de Charonne, opposite no. 149; this entrance is adorned with an archway produced by architect Hector Guimard, prime contractor for the company. It was listed as a historic monument by the decree of 29 May 29, 1978.
- Entrance 2: Rue du Mont-Louis: a staircase decorated with a Dervaux candelabra, located at the corner of Avenue Philippe-Auguste and Rue de Mont-Louis;

=== Station layout ===
Street Level

B1	Mezzanine for platform connection

Platform level	Side platform, doors will open on the right
Platform level	Platform 1	← toward Porte Dauphine (Père Lachaise)
Platform level	Platform 2	toward Nation (Alexandre Dumas) →
Platform level	Side platform, doors will open on the right

=== Platforms ===
Philippe Auguste is a standard configuration station. It has two platforms separated by the metro tracks and the vault is elliptical. The decoration is in the style used for most metro stations, the lighting canopies are white and rounded in the Gaudin style of the metro revival of the 2000s, and the bevelled white ceramic tiles cover the walls and tunnel exits. The layout was completely refurbished in 2018; thus, white ceramic advertising frames have replaced the metal surrounds, while the green Motte style seats have been replaced with blue Akiko seats.

=== Bus connections ===
The station is served by line 71 of the RATP Bus Network.

== Nearby ==
The famous Père Lachaise Cemetery is nearby as is the Square de la Roquette.
