= Avron station =

Métro station in Paris, France

Avron
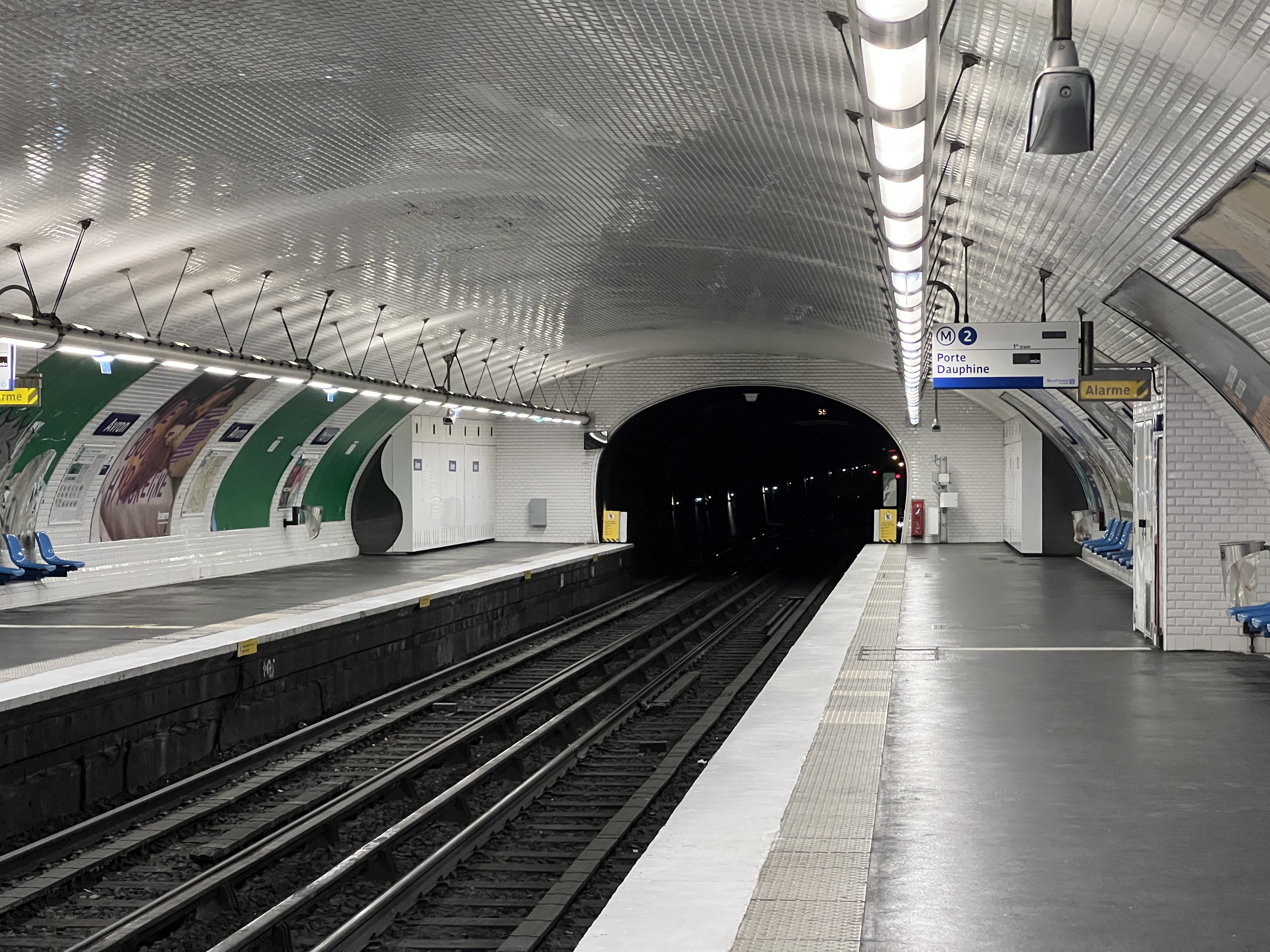

General information
- Location: 35, Boul. de Charonne; 11th arrondissement of Paris; Île-de-France; France
- Coordinates: 48°51′07″N 2°23′52″E
- Owner: RATP
- Operator: RATP
- Line: Paris Metro Paris Metro Line 2
- Platforms: 2 (side platforms)
- Tracks: 2

Construction
- Accessible: no

Other information
- Fare zone: 1

History
- Opened: 2 April 1903

Services
Preceding station	Paris Metro	Following station
Alexandre Dumas towards Porte Dauphine	Line 2	Nation Terminus
Route map
Location
- Location within Paris

Avron (French pronunciation: [avʁɔ̃]) is a station on Line 2 of the Paris Métro, on the border of the 11th and 20th arrondissements.

== Location ==
The station is located under Boulevard de Charonne, at the intersection with Rue d'Avron and Rue de Montreuil. Oriented approximately along a north–south axis, it is located between the Alexandre Dumas metro station and the eastern terminus of Nation.

== History ==
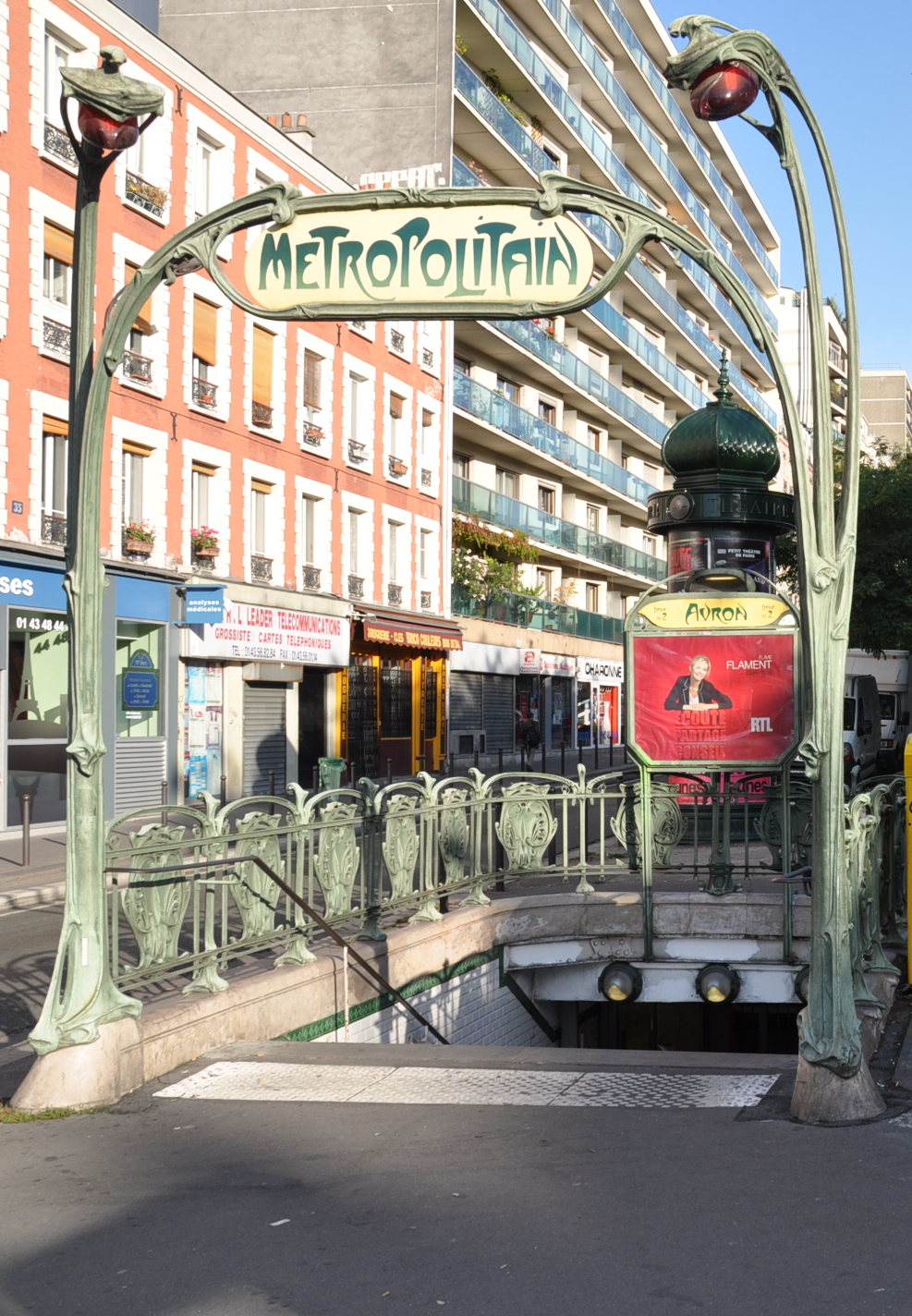
Guimard entrance at the station.

The station was opened on 2 April 1903 when the line was extended from Bagnolet (now called Alexandre Dumas) to Nation. It is named after the Rue d'Avron, which is named after a small nearby plateau that served an important role in the defence of Paris during the Siege of Paris in the Franco-Prussian War.

It was the location of the Barrière de Montreuil, a gate built for the collection of taxation as part of the Wall of the Farmers-General; the gate was built between 1784 and 1788 and demolished in the nineteenth century.

As part of the RATP Renouveau du métro renovation program, the entire station was renovated by 9 December 2005.

On 16 July 2018, part of the nameplates of the station were temporarily replaced to celebrate the victory of the French football team at the 2018 FIFA World Cup, as in five other stations. Avron is humorously renamed Nous Avron gagné as a play on words.

In 2019, 1,871,024 travelers entered this station which places it in 256th position for metro stations for its attendance out of 302.

== Passenger services ==
=== Access ===
The station has a single entrance called Boulevard de Charonne, leading to the central median of this boulevard, opposite no. 35. Made up of a fixed staircase, it is adorned with a Guimard entrance, which is subject to a decree as a historical monument on 29 May 1978.

=== Station layout ===
Street Level

B1	Mezzanine for platform connection

Platform level	Side platform, doors will open on the right
Platform level	Platform 1	← toward Porte Dauphine (Alexandre Dumas)
Platform level	Platform 2	toward Nation (Terminus) →
Platform level	Side platform, doors will open on the right

=== Platforms ===
Avron is a standard configuration station. It has two platforms separated by the metro tracks and the vault is elliptical. The decoration is in the style used for the majority of the metro stations. The bevelled white ceramic tiles cover the walls, the vault, the tunnel exits and the outlets of the corridors, while the lighting is provided by two white lighting tubes. The advertising frames are metallic and the name of the station is written in Parisine font on enamelled plates. The Motte style seats are dark blue.

=== Bus connections ===
The station is served by line 57 of the RATP Bus Network.

== Gallery ==
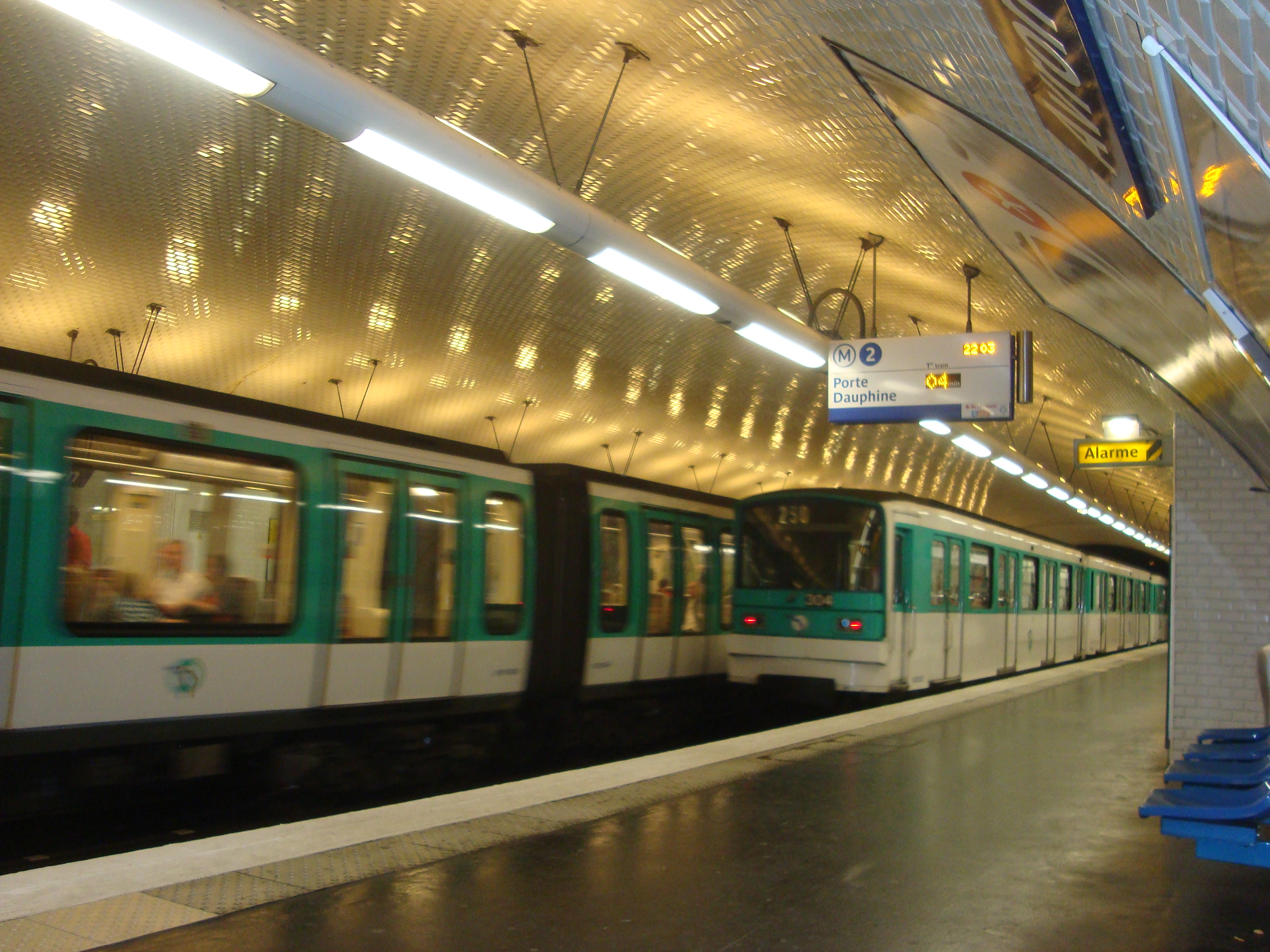
MF 67 and MF 2000 rolling stock at Avron

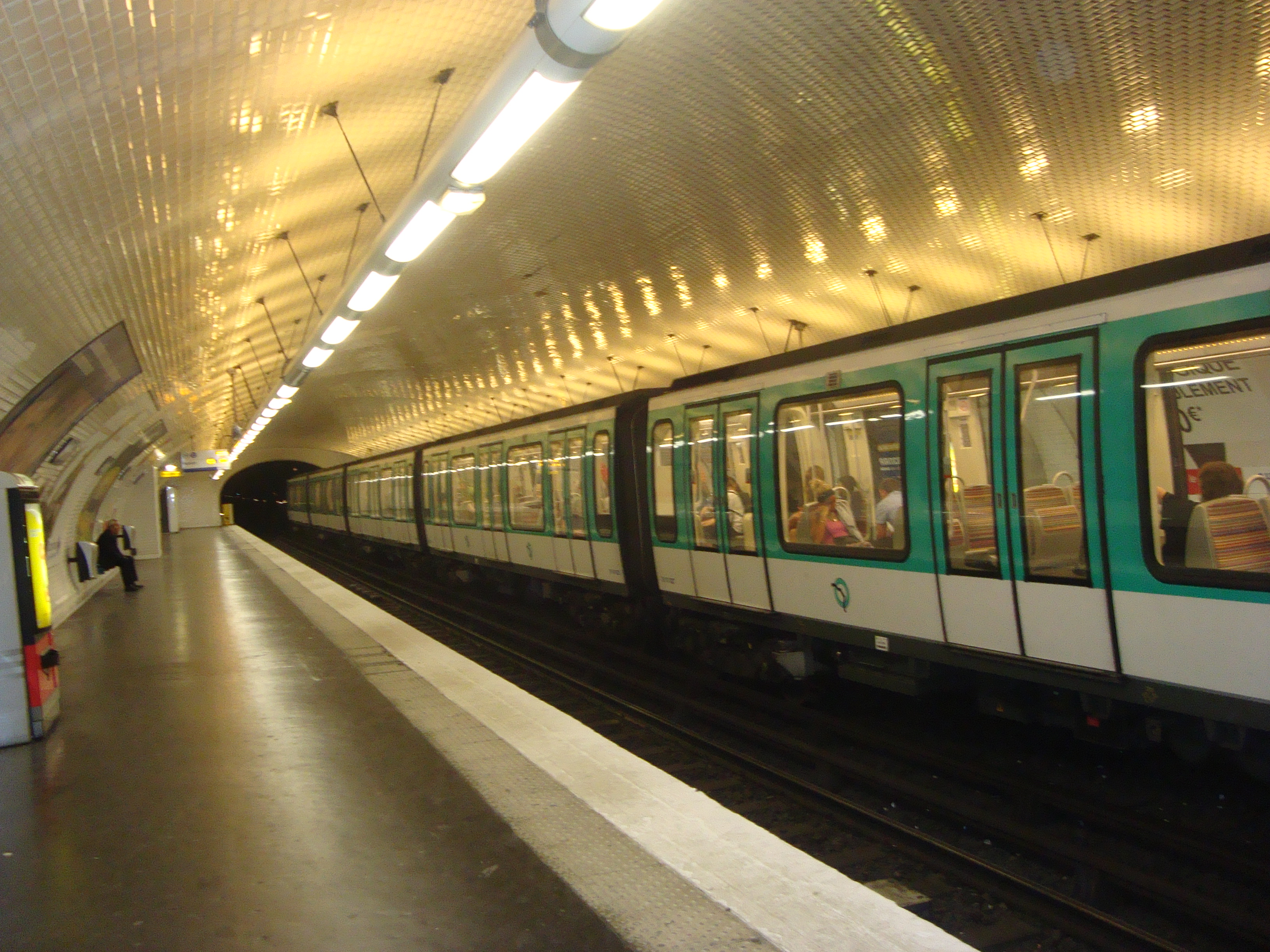
MF 2000 rolling stock at Avron

== Sources ==
- Roland, Gérard (2003). Stations de métro. D'Abbesses à Wagram. Éditions Bonneton.
