= Alexandre Dumas station =

Métro station in Paris, France

Alexandre Dumas
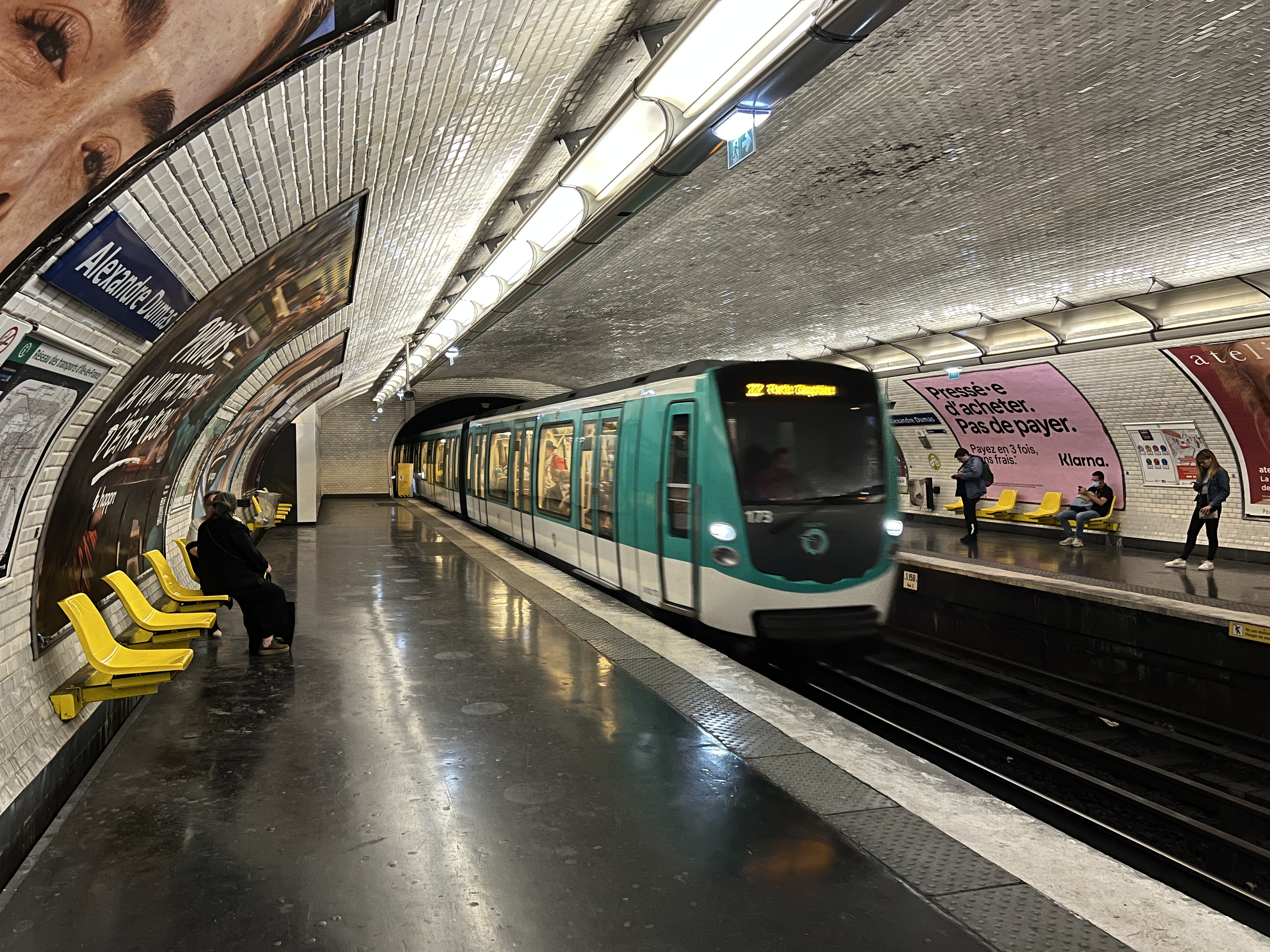
- MF 01 rolling stock at Alexandre Dumas in 2022

General information
- Location: 111, Boul. de Charonne; 11th arrondissement of Paris; Île-de-France; France
- Coordinates: 48°51′21″N 2°23′41″E
- Owner: RATP
- Operator: RATP
- Line: Paris Metro Paris Metro Line 2
- Platforms: 2 (side platforms)
- Tracks: 2

Construction
- Accessible: no

Other information
- Fare zone: 1

History
- Opened: 31 January 1903
- Former names: Bagnolet (1903–1970)

Services
Preceding station	Paris Metro	Following station
Philippe Auguste towards Porte Dauphine	Line 2	Avron towards Nation
Route map
Location
- Location within Paris

Alexandre Dumas (French pronunciation: [alɛksɑ̃dʁ dymɑ]) is a station on Line 2 of the Paris Métro, on the border of the 11th and 20th arrondissements.

== Location ==
The station is located under Boulevard de Charonne at its intersection with Rue de Charonne and Rue de Bagnolet. Oriented approximately along a north-west / south-east axis, it is located between the Philippe Auguste and Avron metro stations.

== History ==
The station was opened on 31 January 1903 as part of the extension of line 2 (known at the time as "2 Nord") from Anvers. It was the eastern terminus of the line until 2 April 1903 when it was extended to Nation. The station was originally called Bagnolet after the Rue de Bagnolet, the road to Bagnolet. On 13 September 1970, it was renamed after the French author Alexandre Dumas and the Rue Alexandre Dumas. It was the location of the Barrière de Fontarabie, a gate built for the collection of taxation as part of the Wall of the Farmers-General; the gate was built between 1784 and 1788 and demolished during the nineteenth century.

As part of the RATP Metro Renewal program, the station corridors and platform lighting were renovated on 12 May 2005.

On 1 April 2016, some of the station's name plates were temporarily replaced by the RATP to produce April Fools jokes for a day, as in the case of twelve other stations. Alexandre Dumas was humorously renamed Les Trois Mousquetaires (The Three Musketeers) in reference to the famous novel by this writer.

As part of the action plan in 2018 to improve air quality in the metro, the station was the first in which two air purifiers were tested using an Ip'Air device developed by Suez. They were inaugurated on 7 June 2019 on the platform in the direction of Nation and set up for a period of six months.

In 2019, 3,439,879 travelers entered this station which placed it at the 142nd position of the metro stations for its usage.

== Passenger services ==
=== Access ===
The station has a single exit entitled Boulevard de Charonne, leading to the central reservation of the boulevard to the right of No. 111. Consisting of a fixed staircase, it is decorated with a Guimard entrance, which is subject to a registration as historic monuments by decree of 12 February 2016.

=== Station layout ===
Street Level

B1	Mezzanine for platform connection

Platform level	Side platform, doors will open on the right
Platform level	Platform 1	← toward Porte Dauphine (Philippe Auguste)
Platform level	Platform 2	toward Nation (Avron) →
Platform level	Side platform, doors will open on the right

=== Platforms ===
Alexandre Dumas is a standard configuration station. It has two platforms separated by the metro tracks and the vault is elliptical. The decoration is the style used for most metro stations, the lighting canopies are white and rounded in the Gaudin style of the metro revival of the 2000s, and the bevelled white ceramic tiles cover the walls, the vault, the tunnel exits, and the outlets of the corridors. The advertising frames are metallic, and the name of the station is written in Parisine font on enameled plates. The seats are dark blue Motte style (replacing yellow seats of the same original model).

=== Bus connections ===
The station is served by line 76 of the RATP Bus Network.

== Gallery ==
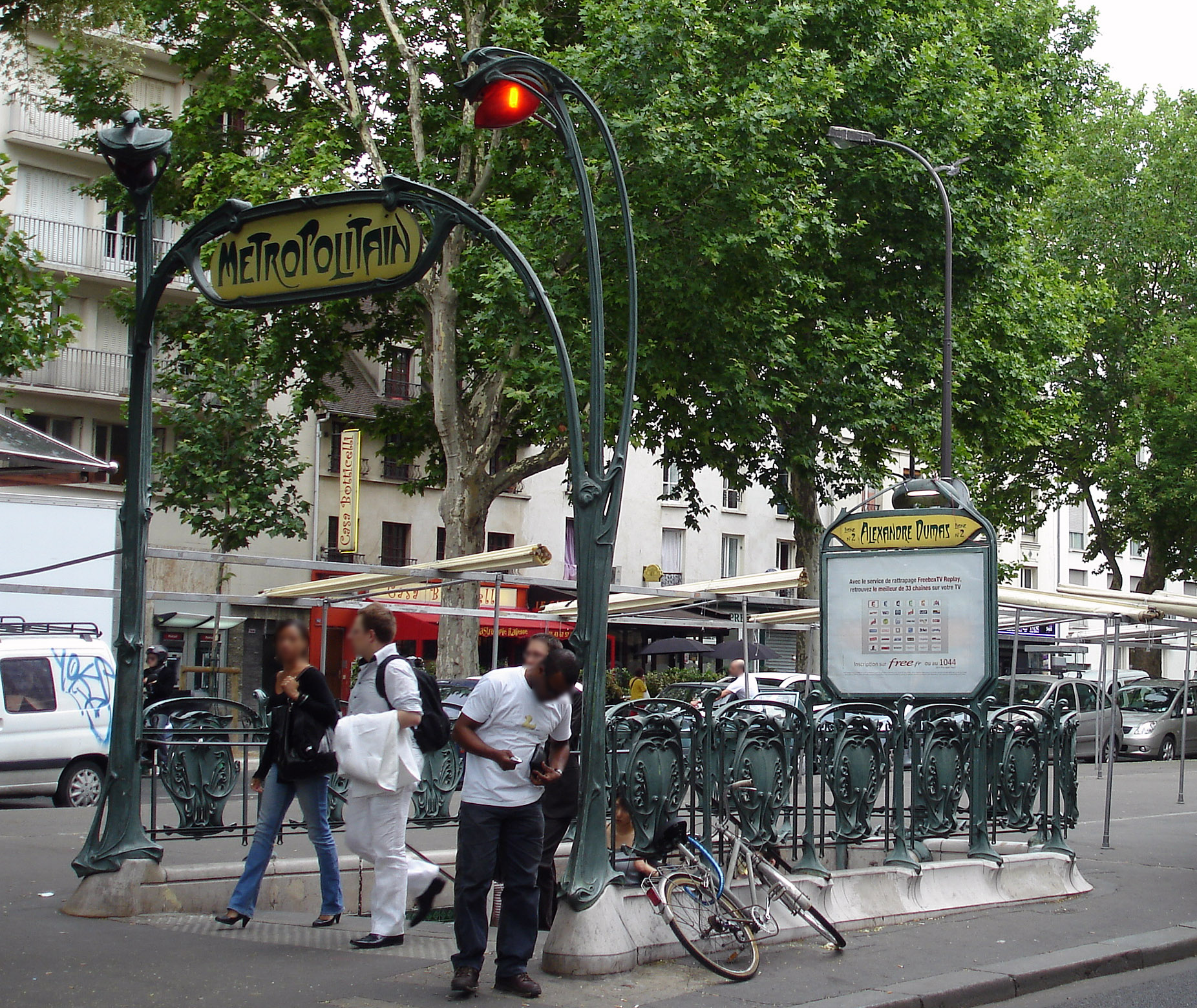
Street-level entrance to station platforms

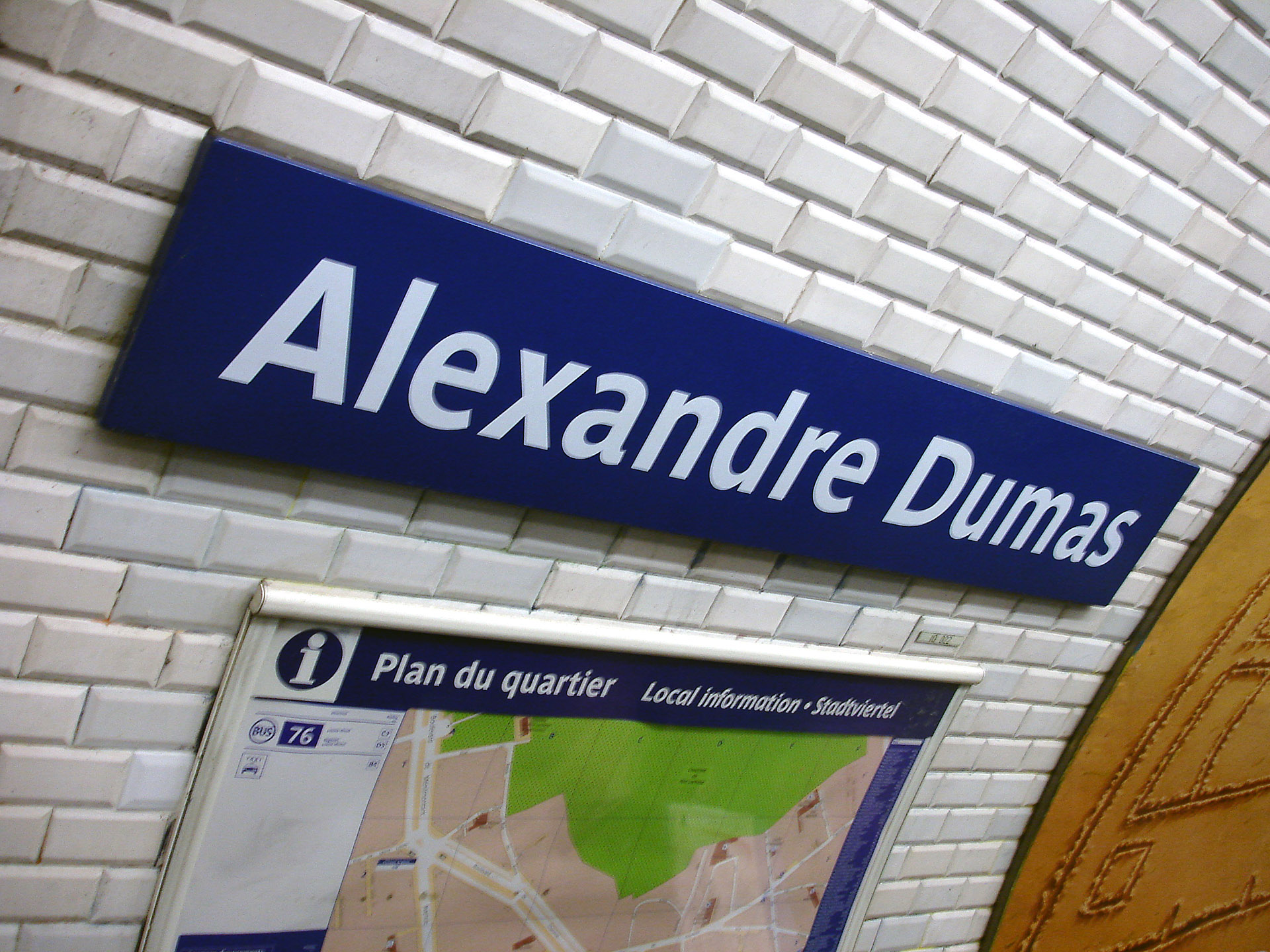
Station signage
