= Nation station =

Railway station in Paris, France

Nation
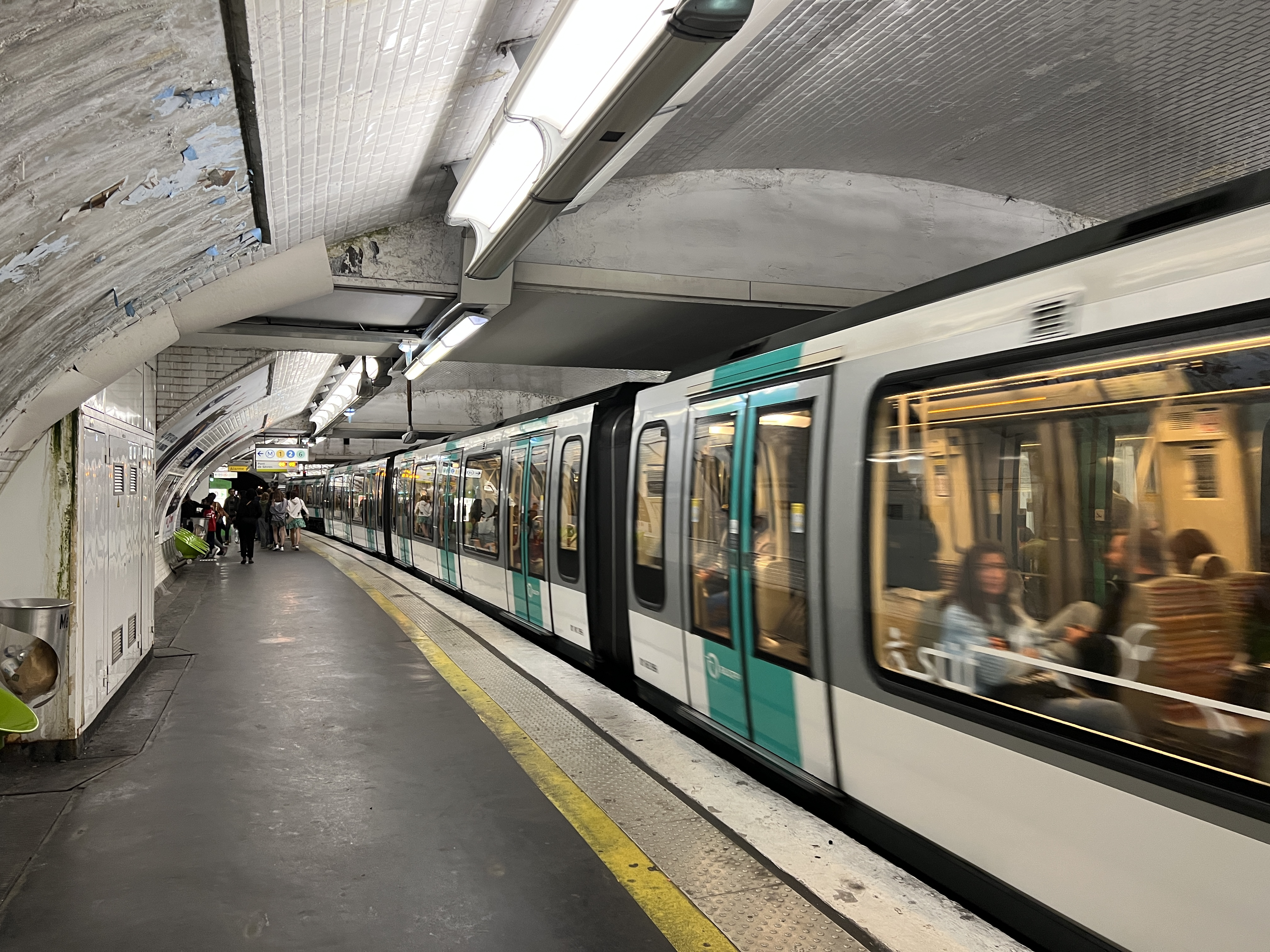
- Line 9 station

General information
- Location: 11th and 12th arrondissement of Paris; France
- Coordinates: 48°50′54″N 2°23′45″E
- Operator: RATP Group
- Platforms: Line 1: 2 side platforms; Line 2: 1 island platform; Line 6: 1 island platform; Line 9: 2 side platforms; RER A: 2 side platforms
- Tracks: 10 (2 per line)
- Connections: RATP Bus: 26 56 57 71 86 215 351; Noctilien: N11

Construction
- Structure type: Underground
- Accessible: Line 1, 2, 9: Yes; Line 6: No; RER A: Yes, by request to staff

Other information
- Station code: 87758102 (RER A); 0510 (Métro)
- Fare zone: 1

History
- Opened: Line 1: 19 July 1900; Line 2: 2 April 1903; Line 6: 1 March 1909; Line 9: 10 December 1933; RER A: 14 December 1969

Services
Preceding station	Paris Metro	Following station
Reuilly–Diderot towards La Défense	Line 1	Porte de Vincennes towards Château de Vincennes
Avron towards Porte Dauphine	Line 2	Terminus
Picpus towards Charles de Gaulle–Étoile	Line 6	Terminus
Rue des Boulets towards Pont de Sèvres	Line 9	Buzenval towards Mairie de Montreuil
Preceding station	RER	Following station
Gare de Lyon towards Saint-Germain-en-Laye, Cergy-le-Haut or Poissy	RER A	Vincennes towards Boissy-Saint-Léger or Marne-la-Vallée–Chessy
Route map
Line 1
Line 2
Line 6
Line 9
RER
Location
- Location within Paris

Nation station (French pronunciation: [nɑsjɔ̃]) is a station of the Paris Métro and Île-de-France's RER commuter rail service. It serves Line 1, Line 2, Line 6 and Line 9 of the Paris Métro and RER A. It takes its name from its location at the Place de la Nation.

== Location ==
The station is under and around Place de la Nation – each stopping point oriented along an east–west axis.

The station of line 1 is in a curve, under the southern part of the square, enclosed between the loop stations of lines 2 and 6.

The terminus of line 2 forms a loop under the square. The arrival on the loop is under Avenue de Taillebourg, and the departure under Avenue du Trône, Place des Antilles and Boulevard de Charonne. The station is located southwest of the loop and has two tracks framing a large central platform.

The terminus of line 6 also forms a loop, with the arrival under Avenue du Bel-Air and the departure under Avenue Dorian, Rue de Picpus and Avenue de Saint-Mandé. The trains run along the loop during peak hours but turn back towards Avenue du Bel-Air during off-peak hours (the Dorian-Picpus tunnel then serving as a garage).

The station of line 9, also in a curve, is set lower than the others, under the northern part of the square, between Boulevard Voltaire and Avenue de Taillebourg. The station of line 9 carries the subtitle Place des Antilles.

== History ==
The station serves as the eastern terminus of both Paris Métro Line 2 and Paris Métro Line 6. The Line 1 station opened as part of the first stage of the line between Porte de Vincennes and Porte Maillot on 19 July 1900. The Line 2 platforms opened when the line was extended from Bagnolet (now Alexandre Dumas) on 2 April 1903. The Line 6 platforms opened when the line was extended from Place d'Italie to Nation on 1 March 1909. The Line 9 platforms opened when the first stage of the line was extended from Richelieu – Drouot to Porte de Montreuil on 10 December 1933. On 12 December 1969, the RER station was opened as a new Paris terminus for the Ligne de Vincennes, replacing the old Gare de La Bastille. On 8 December 1977 the central section of line A opened from Nation to Auber.

It is named after the Place de la Nation, named in honour of Bastille Day in 1880. Previously it was called the Place du Trône, where guillotines were set up during the French Revolution.

From the 1960s to 2010, the decorative style Mouton-Duvernet was applied to the platforms of lines 2, 6 and 9 with some specificities. The tiles of line 6 have particular patterns, while those of lines 2 and 9 are bevelled and in two shades of orange, colour randomly distributed on the walls and the tympans. The lighting strips are fitted with metal blades on line 2, while they are typical of the Mouton style on lines 6 and 9. On the latter, the name of the station is written in capital letters on projecting backlit panels, while the 'shell' seats, characteristic of the Motte style, are white. This stopping point is the only one to have lost its decoration since the renovation of the station, implemented within the framework of the RATP Renouveau du métro program.

In the 1990s, the platforms of line 1 were renovated in red Ouï-dire style.

As part of line 1's automation works, the platforms of this line were raised on the weekend of 12 to 13 September 2009, then fitted with platform doors in April 2011.

In 2019, 8.834,660 travelers entered this station which placed it at the 22nd position of the metro stations for its usage.

== Passenger services ==
=== Access ===
This station has six entrances, some of which are shared with the RER. Each leads to the side medians, between the roundabout and the circular path serving the buildings in the square.

- Entrance 1: Avenue du Trône is located at the right of no. 28 at Place de la Nation, at the corner of Avenue du Trône and Avenue du Bel-Air. It has a fixed staircase.
- Entrance 2: Avenue Dorian is located opposite no. 6 at Place de la Nation, at the corner of Rue Jaucourt and Avenue Dorian. Consisting of a fixed staircase, it is adorned with a Guimard entrance, which is the subject of a decree as a historic monument.
- Entrance 3: Boulevard Diderot leads to no. 4 at Place de la Nation, at the corner of Boulevard Diderot and Avenue Dorian. With a fixed staircase, it is also adorned with a Guimard-style entrance and classified as a historic monument.
- Entrance 4: Boulevard Voltaire is located at the right of nos. 1 and 3 of Place de la Nation, at the corner of Rue du Faubourg-Saint-Antoine and Boulevard Voltaire. It has escalators reserved for the exit as well as two fixed staircases. It allows direct access to the RER.
- Entrance 5: Avenue de Taillebourg is located opposite no. 15 at Place de la Nation, at the corner of Avenue de Taillebourg and Avenue du Trône. It has escalators and fixed stairs and allows direct access to the RER.
- Entrance 6: Avenue du Bel-Air leads to no. 24bis at Place de la Nation, at the corner of Avenue du Bel-Air and Rue Fabre-d'Églantine. It consists of an elevator which only gives access to the RER.

=== Station layout ===
G	Street Level	Exits/Entrances
M	Mezzanine	Connecting level, to Exits/Entrances
P Lines 1, 2, and 6 platform level	Westbound Line 2	toward Porte Dauphine (Avron) →
P Lines 1, 2, and 6 platform level	Island platform, doors will open on the left, right
P Lines 1, 2, and 6 platform level	Westbound Line 2	toward Porte Dauphine (Avron) →
P Lines 1, 2, and 6 platform level	Side platform with PSDs, doors will open on the right
P Lines 1, 2, and 6 platform level	Westbound Line 1	← toward La Défense–Grande Arche (Reuilly–Diderot)
P Lines 1, 2, and 6 platform level	Eastbound Line 1	toward Château de Vincennes (Porte de Vincennes) →
P Lines 1, 2, and 6 platform level	Side platform with PSDs, doors will open on the right
P Lines 1, 2, and 6 platform level	Westbound Line 6	← toward Charles de Gaulle–Étoile (Picpus) →
P Lines 1, 2, and 6 platform level	Island platform, doors will open on the left, right
P Lines 1, 2, and 6 platform level	Westbound Line 6	← toward Charles de Gaulle–Étoile (Picpus) →
Line 9 platforms	Side platform, doors will open on the right
Line 9 platforms	Westbound Line 9	← toward Pont de Sèvres (Rue des Boulets)
Line 9 platforms	Eastbound Line 9	toward Mairie de Montreuil (Buzenval) →
Line 9 platforms	Side platform, doors will open on the right

=== Platforms ===
The station of line 1, in curve, is of standard configuration. It has two platforms separated by the tracks of the metro and the vault is elliptical. The decoration is red Ouï-dire style. The lighting canopies, of the same colour, are supported by a curved support in the shape of a scythe. The direct lighting is white while the indirect lighting, projected on the vault, is multicoloured. The white ceramic tiles are flat and cover the walls, the vault (diagonally), the tunnel exits and some of the hallways. The advertising frames are white and cylindrical, and the platforms are fitted with silver sit-stand benches as well as platform screen doors.

The station of line 2, also in a curve, is equipped with a central platform framed by two tracks, with the southern one being bordered by a 'dead platform' protected by a fence and partially used as a connecting passage, which connects with the platform in the direction of La Défense station from the line 1 station adjoining it. Established flush with the walls, its ceiling consists of a metal deck, whose beams, silver in colour, are supported by vertical walls. The decoration is in the Mouton-Duvernet style, but with an orange bevelled tiling on the walls and the outlets of connecting corridors with line 1, a feature that was also found in the station of line 9 before its renovation; in addition, they are aligned horizontally and vertically. The lighting canopies are specific, fitted with metal blades. The advertising frames are also metallic and the 'shell' seats, characteristic of the Motte style, are blue.

The station on line 6, like that on line 2, has two tracks framing an island platform. However, it is the only one that is not curved, and the vault is elliptical. The decoration is a particular variation of the Mouton style with two characteristic lighting canopies, walls covered with tiles, with unique patterns on the network, aligned horizontally and vertically, as well as a vault painted white. The surrounds of the staircase hoppers are treated with the same tiling for some or with a flat white tiling also aligned horizontally and vertically for others. The advertising frames are metallic and grey, and the platform is equipped with a few white Motte style seats.

Like that of line 1, the station of line 9 is curved and has a classic layout under an elliptical vault. Its decoration is of the style used for most metro stations. The lighting canopies are white and rounded in the Gaudin style of the revival of the renouveau du métro des années 2000, and the bevelled white ceramic tiles cover the walls, the vault and the tunnel exits. The advertising frames are in white ceramics and the seats, in Akiko style, are green. The western part of the platform, in the direction of Mairie de Montreuil, has the distinction of displaying coats of arms of the two French departments of the Antilles: Guadeloupe and Martinique, thus illustrating the subtitle attributed to the platforms of line 9 only.

For each stopping point, the name of the station is written in Parisine font on enamelled plates.

=== Other services ===
The station is connected with line RER A served by the Gare de Nation. This line connects the western and eastern suburbs of Paris.

It is also served:

- by lines 26, 56, 57, 71, 86, 215 and 351 of the RATP Bus Network, the latter being a means of transport to get to Paris Charles-de-Gaulle airport;
- and, at night, by the N11 line (connecting Pont de Neuilly to Château de Vincennes) of the Noctilien bus network.

== Nearby ==
- Place de la Nation

== Culture ==
The entrance to the metro is the setting for the outcome of Abdellatif Kechiche's film Poetical Refugee.

== Future project ==
Ultimately, the station could be connected to the T3a tram line or the T3b tram line, which would be extended from Porte de Vincennes, which would allow users of these lines to benefit from metro lines 2, 6 and 9 as well as with RER A.

== Gallery ==
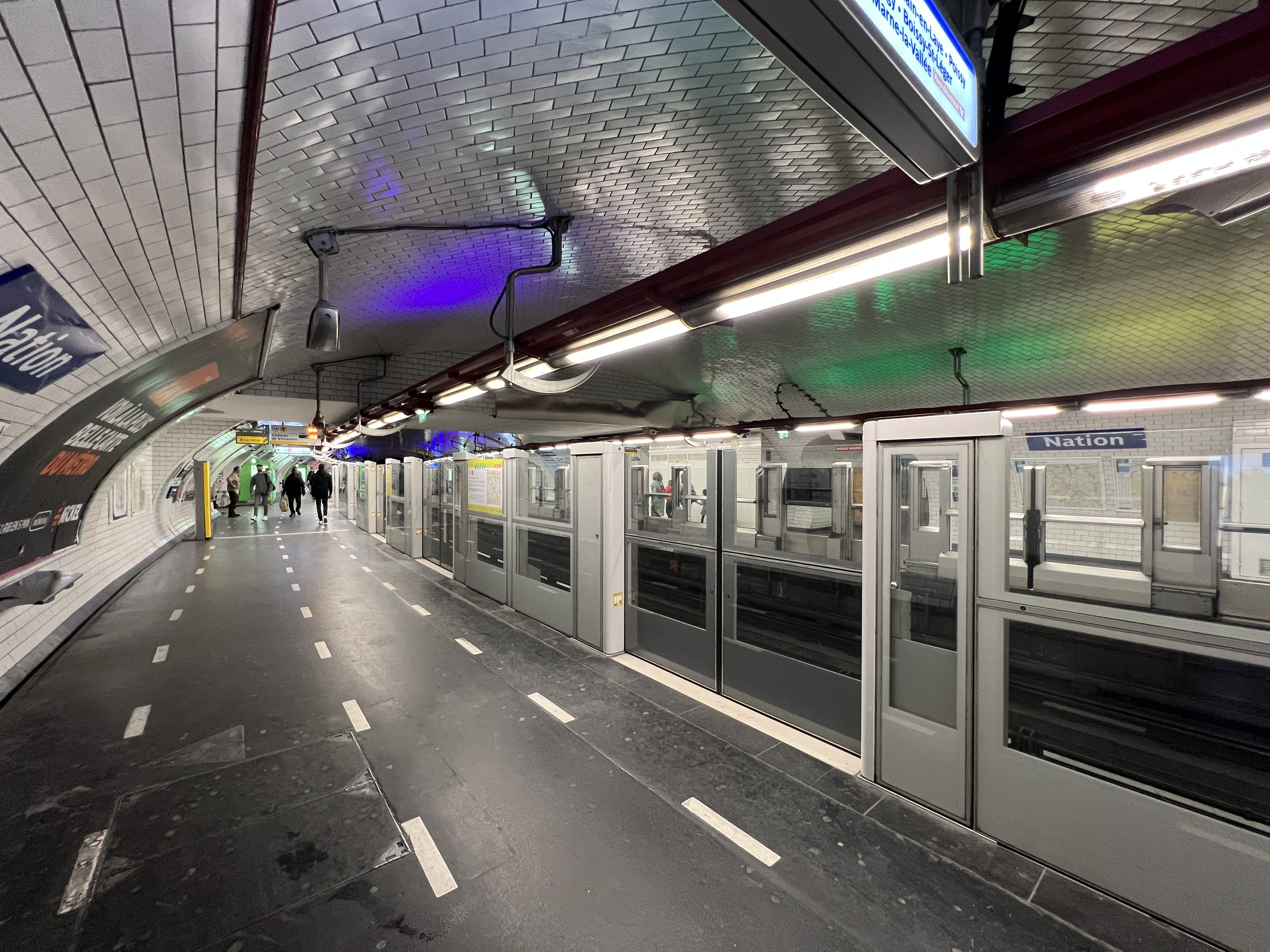
Line 1 platforms

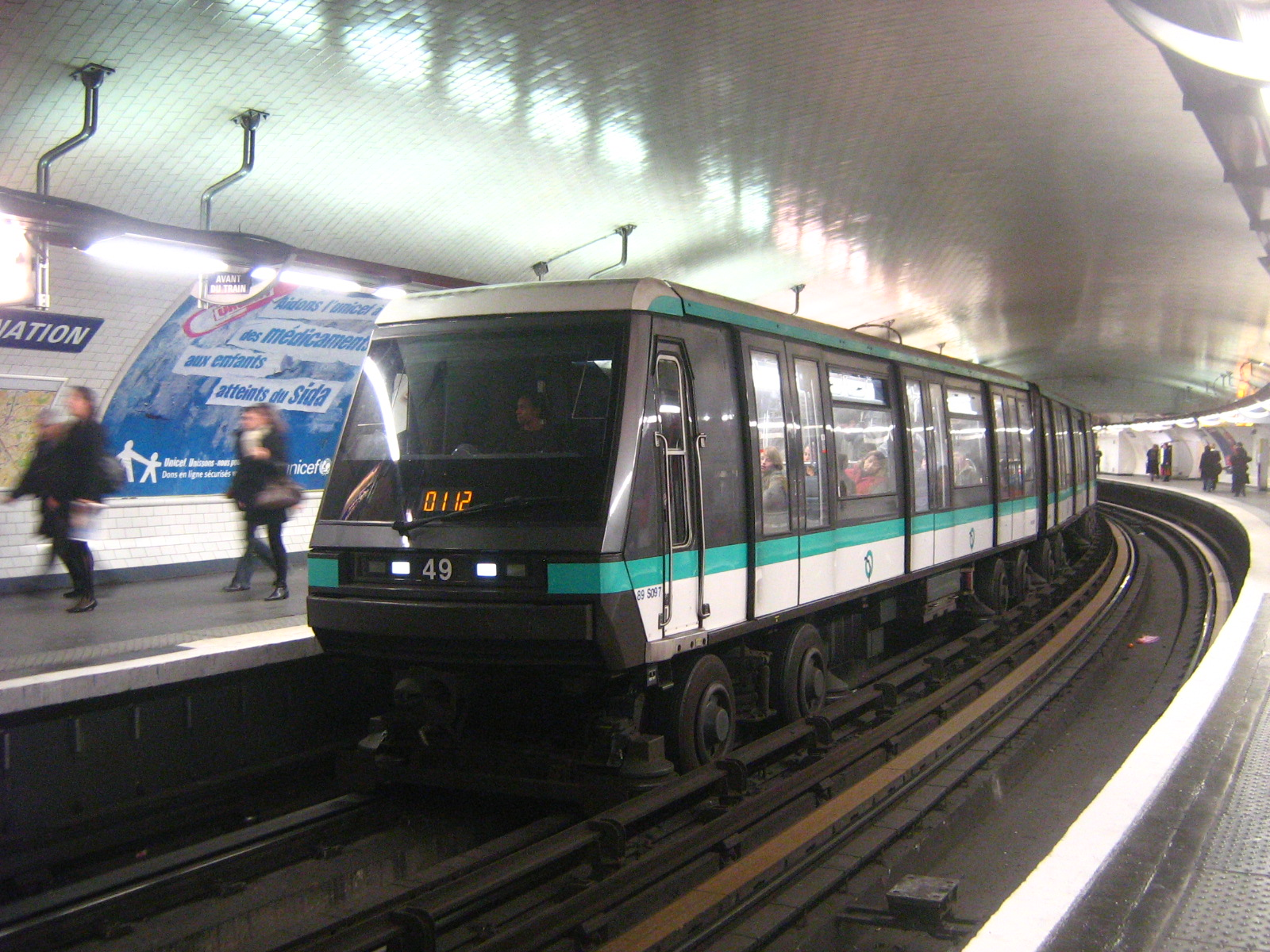
MP 89 rolling stock at Nation

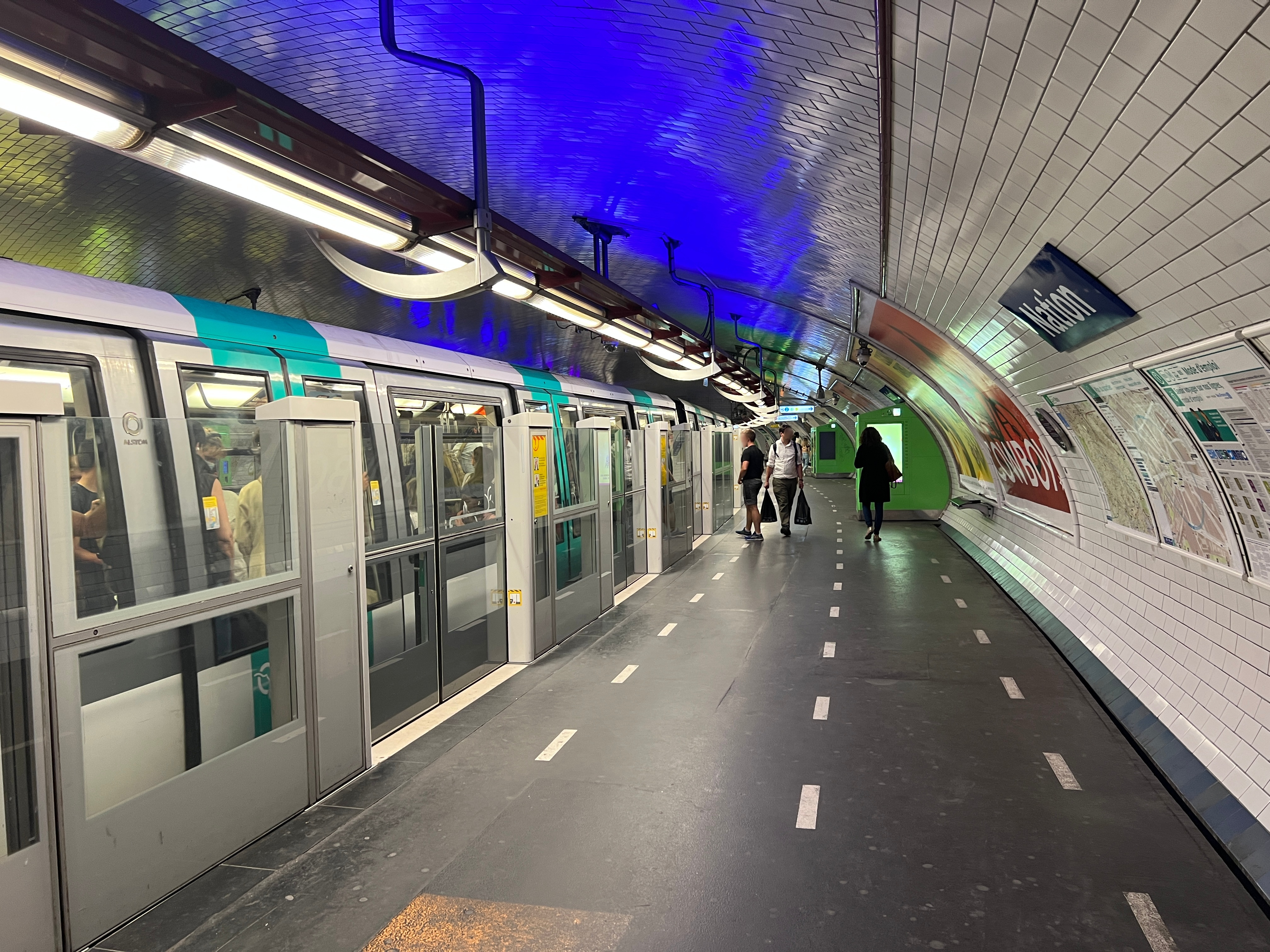
MP 05 rolling stock at Nation

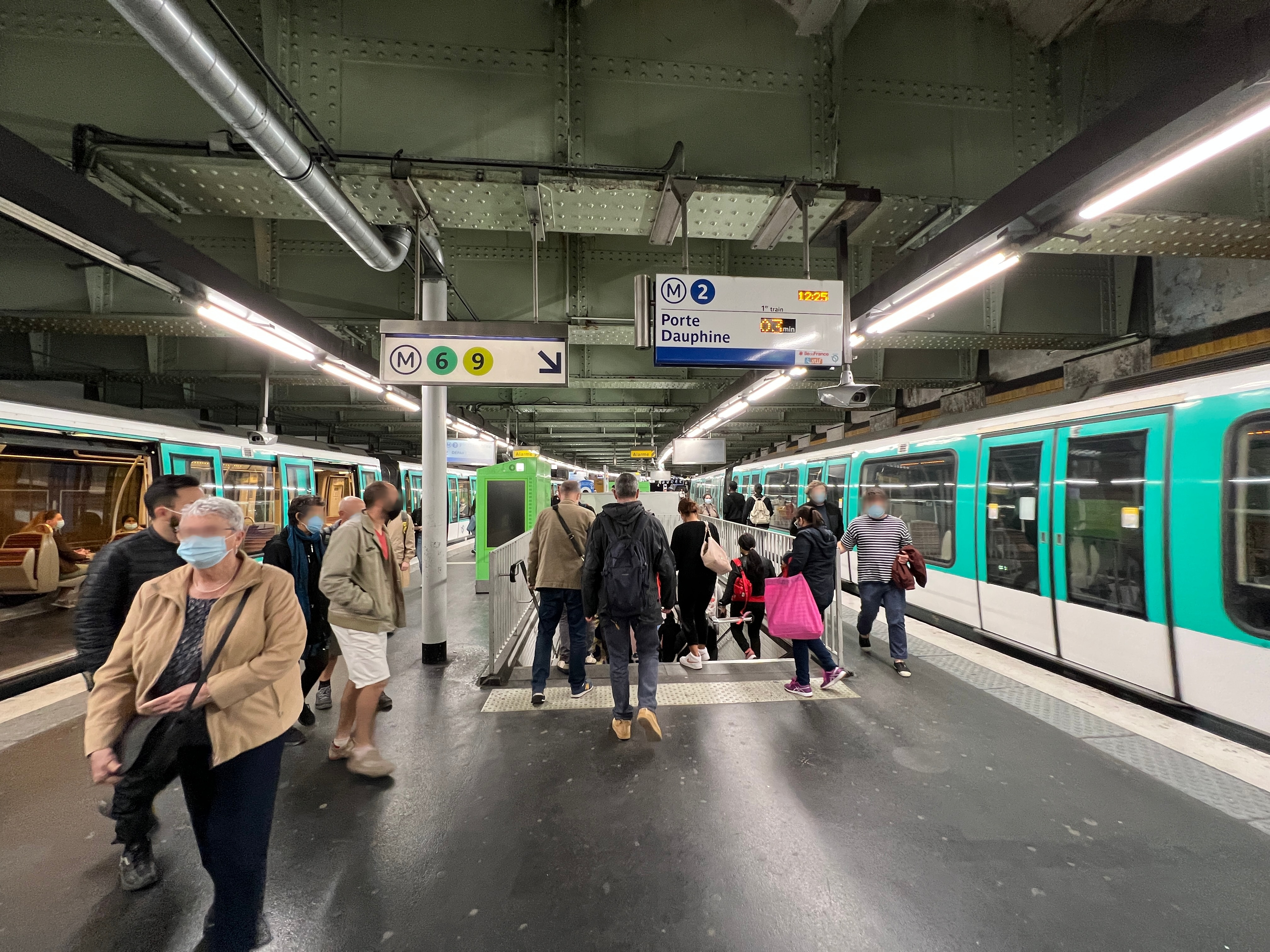
Line 2 platforms

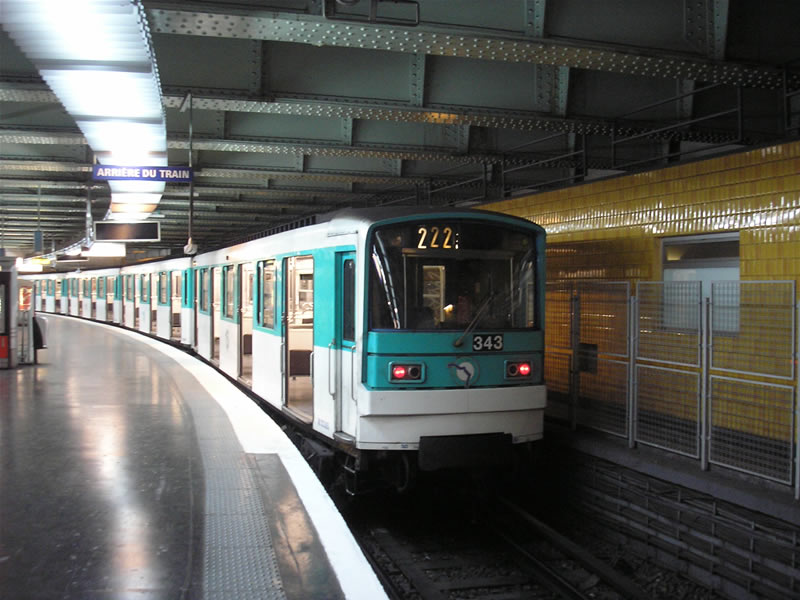
MF 67 rolling stock at Nation

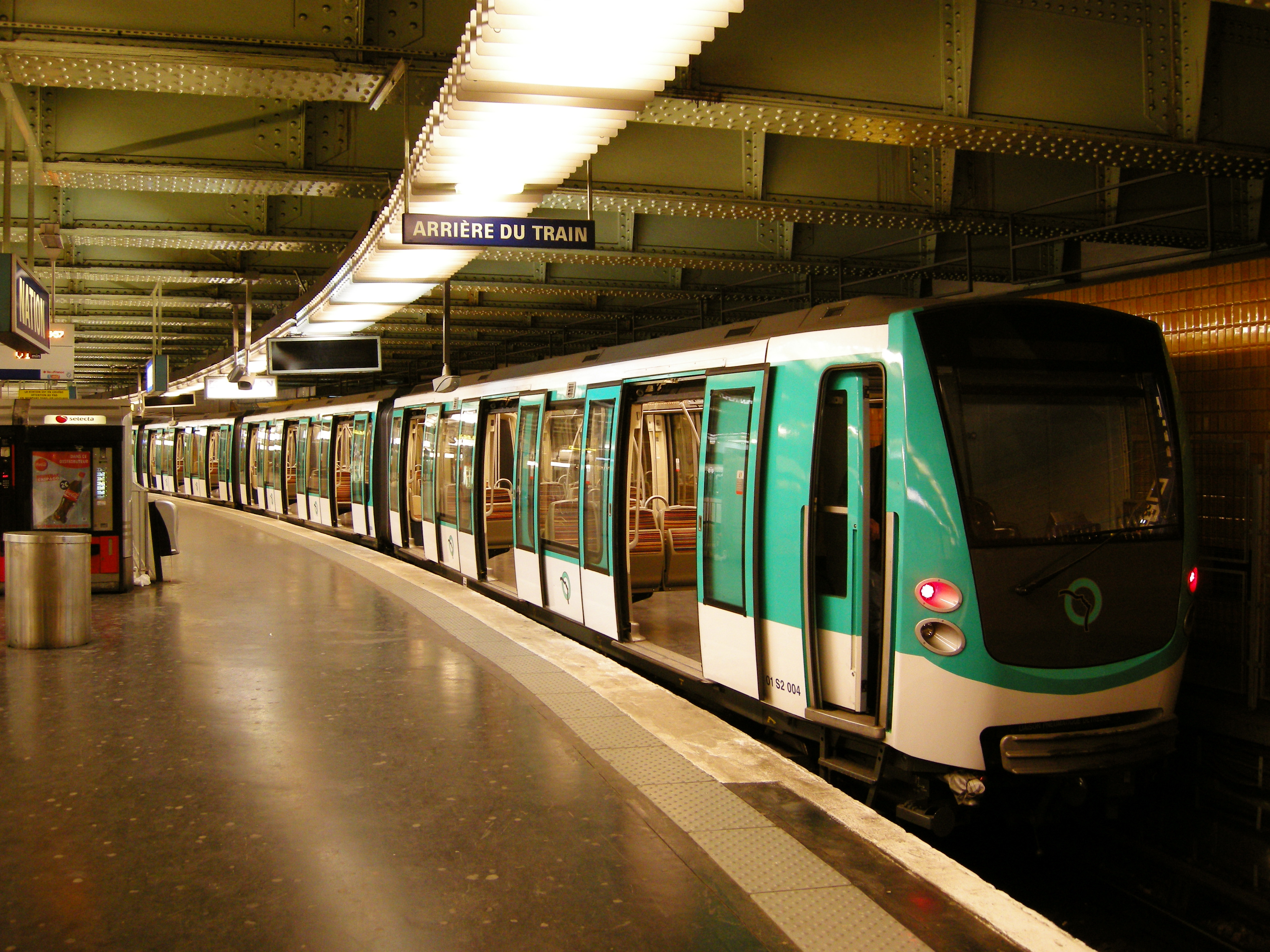
MF 01 rolling stock at Nation

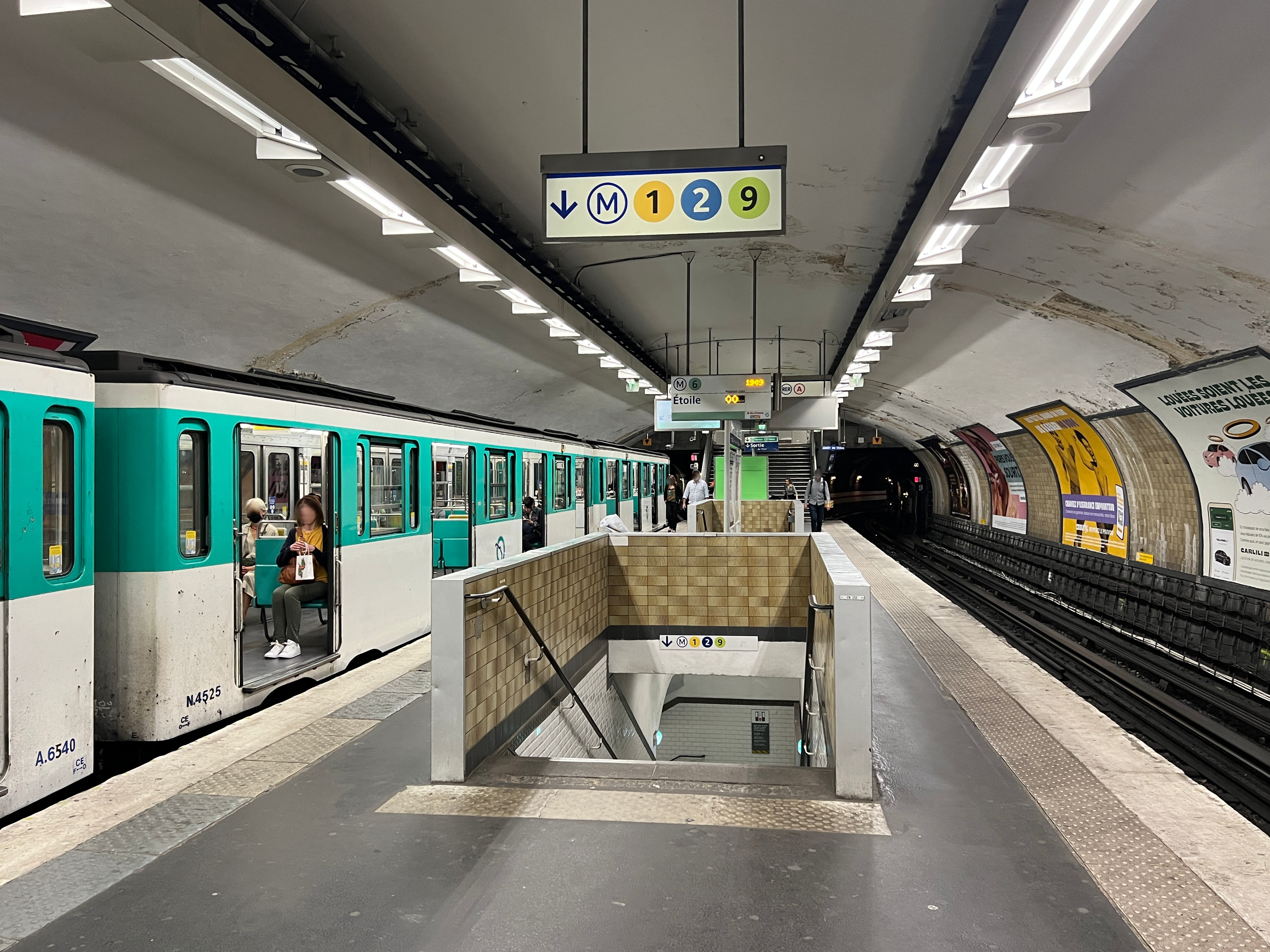
Line 6 platforms

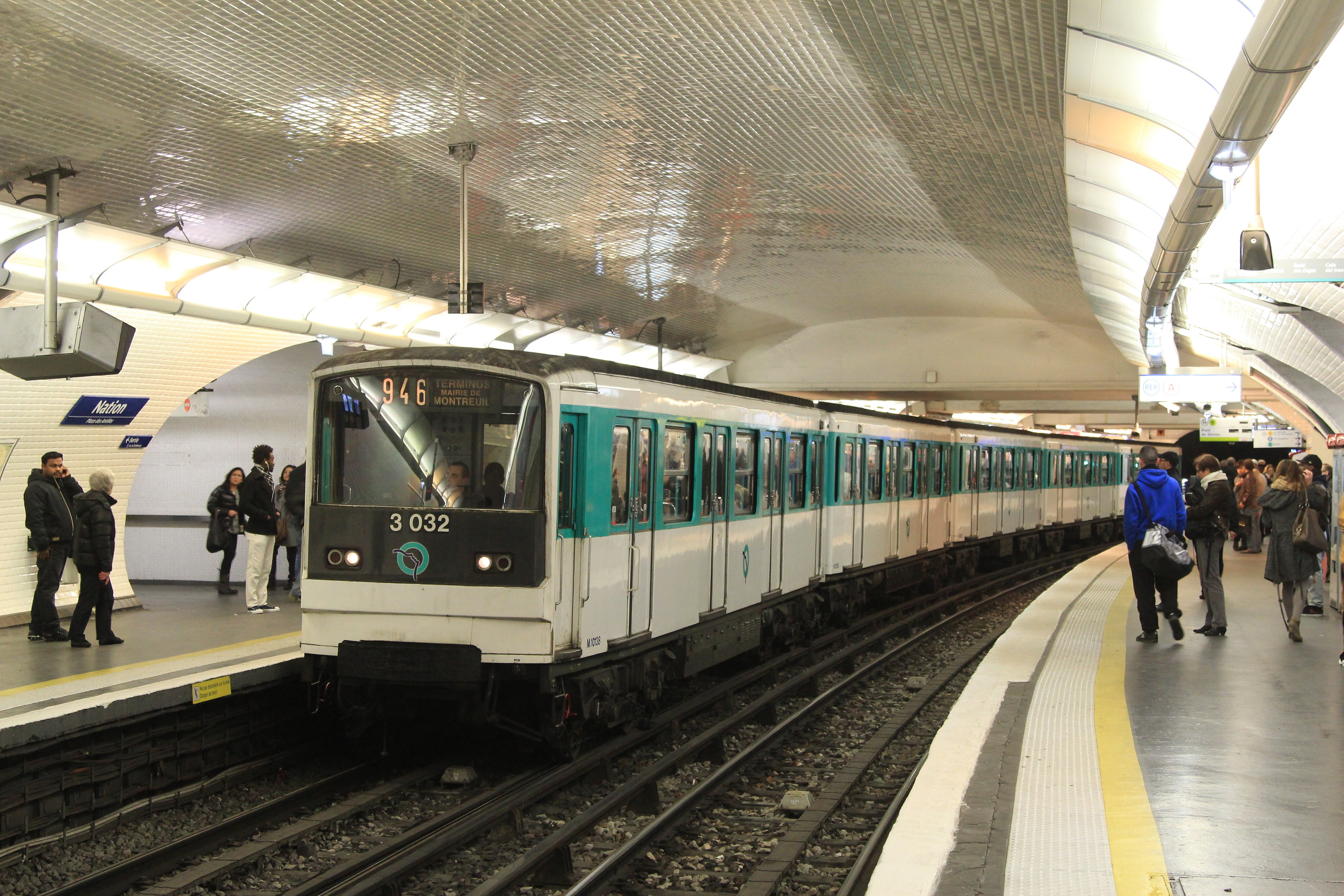
MF 67 rolling stock on Line 9

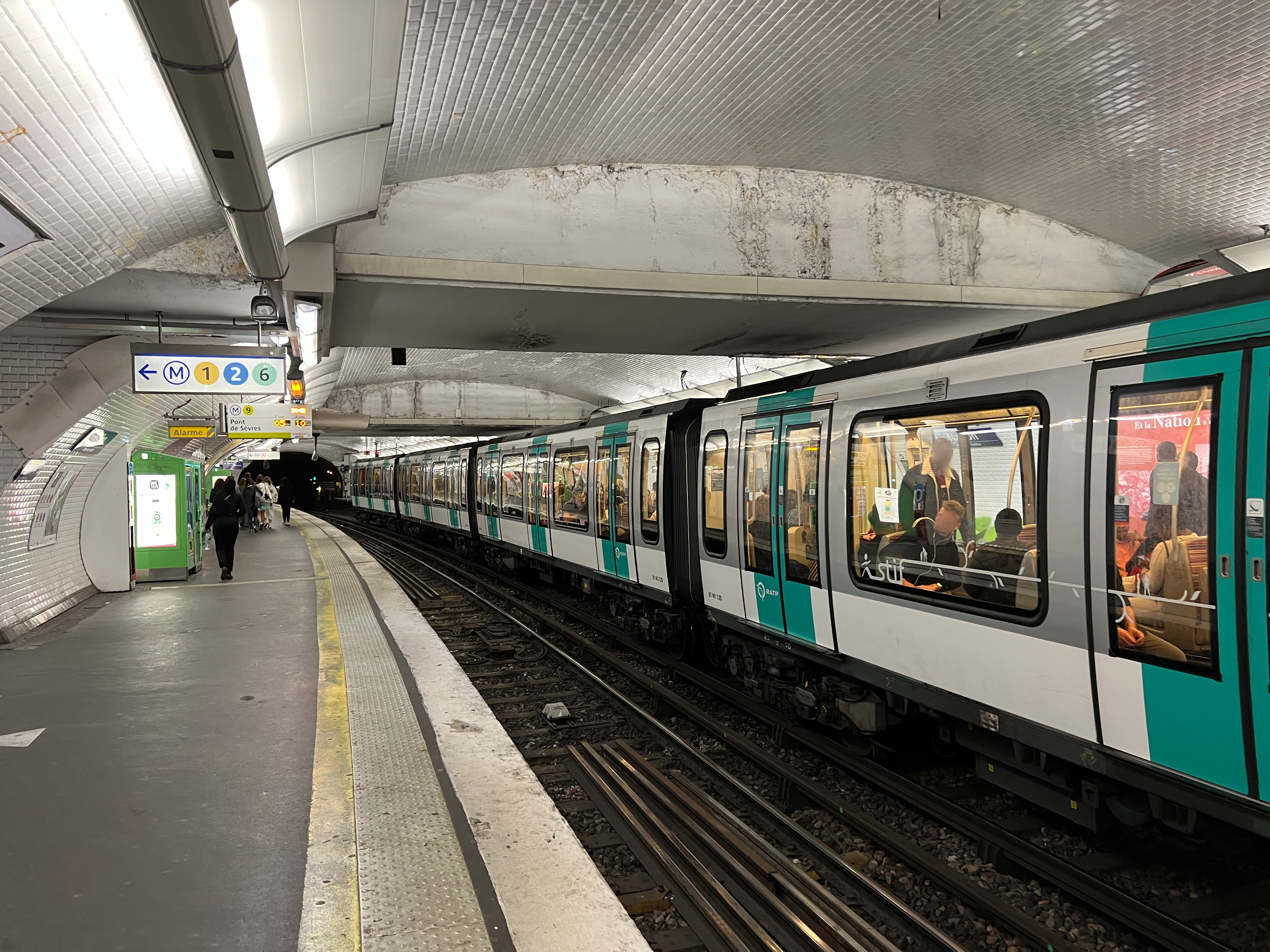
MF 01 rolling stock on Line 9

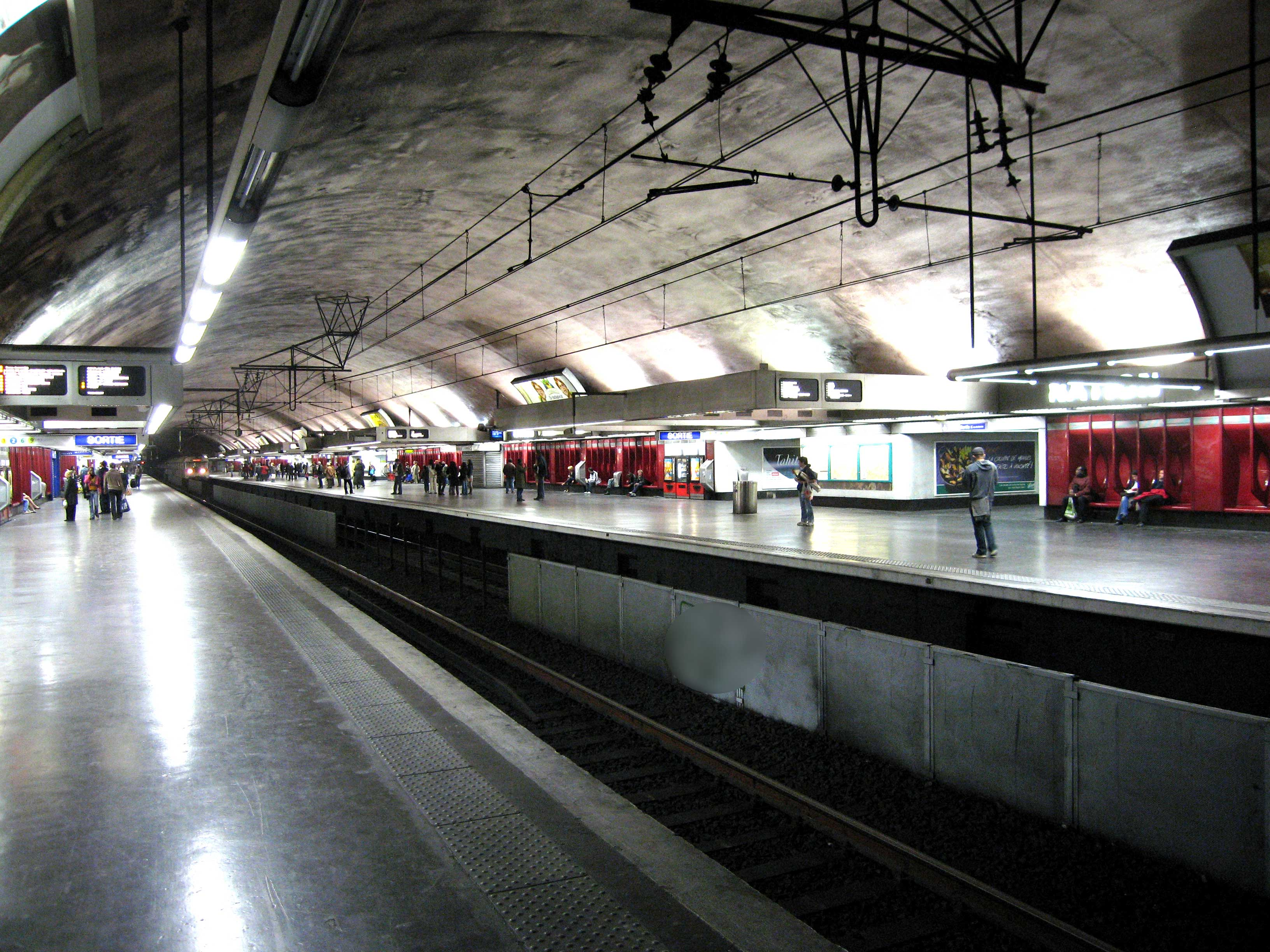
RER A platforms

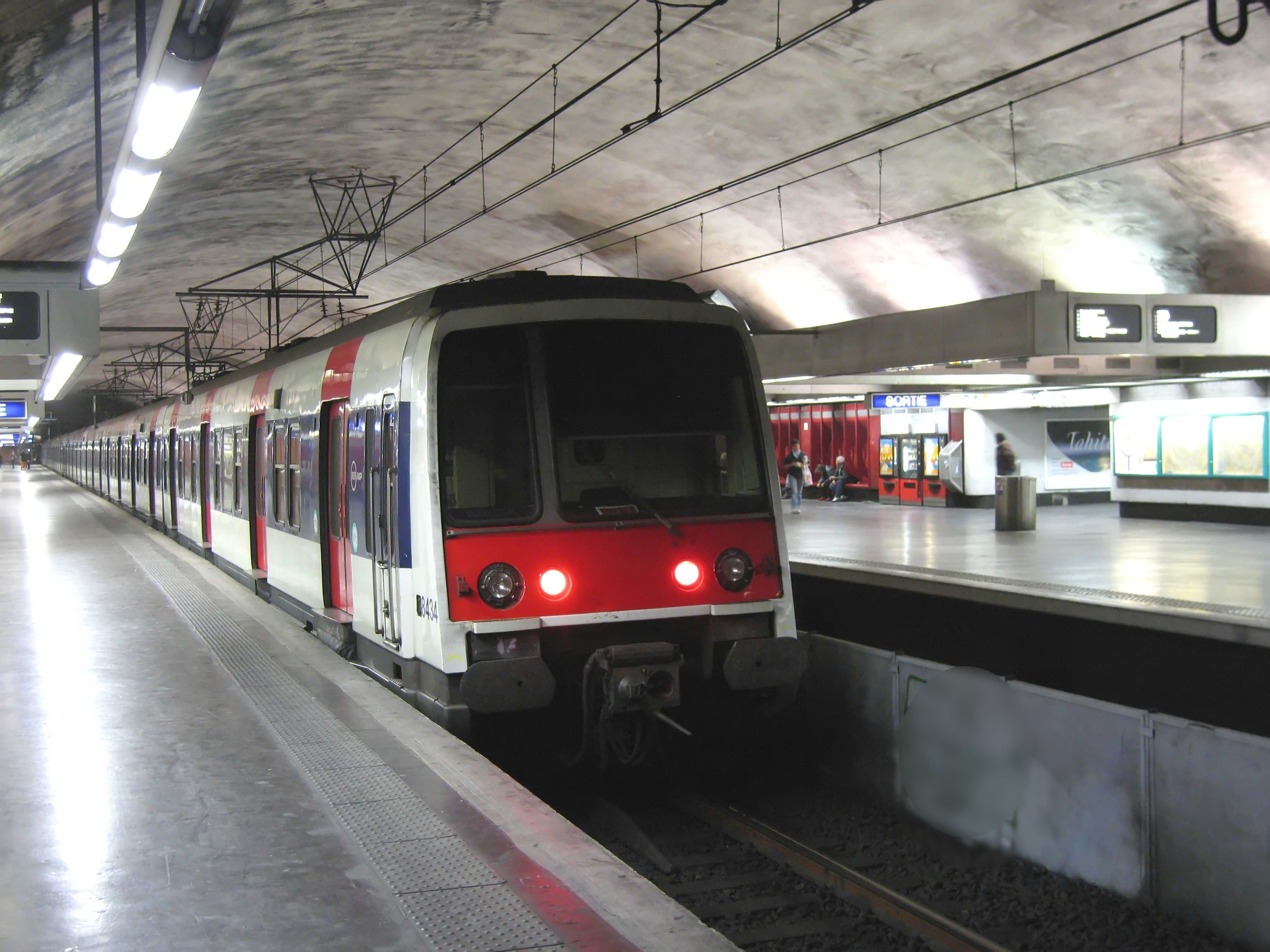
RER A MI 84 rolling stock

== See also ==
- List of stations of the Paris Métro
- List of stations of the Paris RER
