= Paris Metro Line 2 =

Subway route in the French capital

Line 2
- Paris Metro Line 2
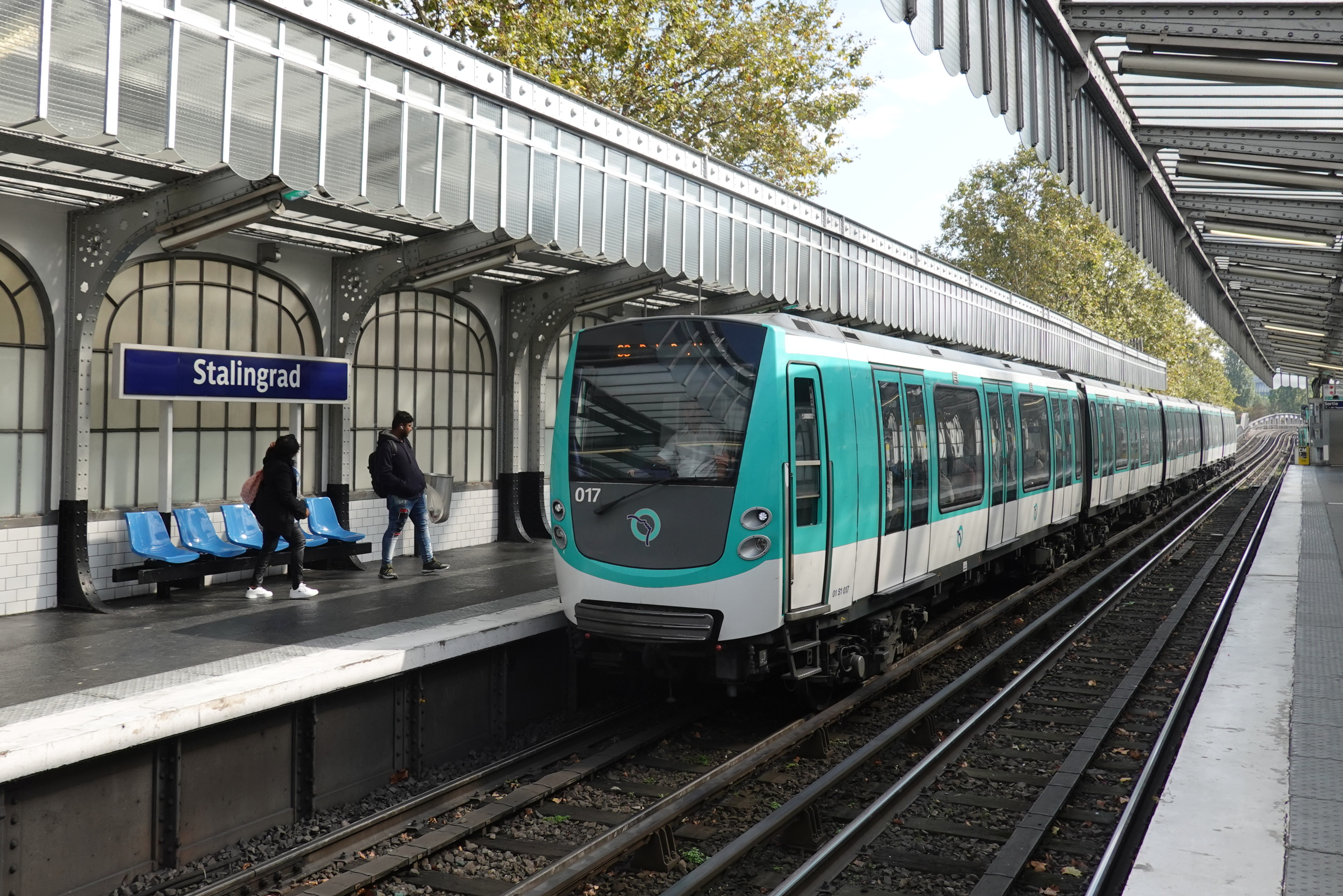
- An MF 01 stock train at Stalingrad station in September 2024.

Overview
- Locale: Paris
- Termini: Porte Dauphine; Nation
- Connecting lines: Paris Metro Paris Metro Line 1 Paris Metro Line 3 Paris Metro Line 4 Paris Metro Line 5 Paris Metro Line 6 Paris Metro Line 7 Paris Metro Line 7bis Paris Metro Line 9 Paris Metro Line 11 Paris Metro Line 12 Paris Metro Line 13 RER RER A RER B RER C RER D RER E Transilien Transilien Line H (Paris-Nord) Transilien Line K (Paris-Nord) Tramways in Île-de-France Île-de-France tramway Line 3b
- Stations: 25

Service
- System: Paris Metro
- Operator: RATP
- Rolling stock: MF 01 (45 trains as of 22 March 2011)
- Ridership: 92 million (2025) (avg. per year)

History
- Opened: 13 December 1900; 125 years ago

Technical
- Line length: 12.4 km (7.7 mi)
- Track gauge: 1,435 mm (4 ft 8 1/2 in)
- Electrification: 750 V DC third rail
- Conduction system: Conductor (PA)
- Average inter-station distance: 513 m (1,683 ft)

Paris Metro Line 2 (French: Ligne 2 du métro de Paris) is one of the sixteen currently open lines of the Paris Métro. Situated almost entirely above the former customs barrier around the capital (Boulevards extérieurs), it runs in a semicircle in the north of Paris.

As its name suggests, Line 2 was the second line of the Métro network to open, with the first section put into service on 13 December 1900, as a branch of the Line 1. It adopted its current configuration on 2 April 1903, running between Porte Dauphine and Nation. There have been no changes in its layout since then.

At 12.3 km (7.6 mi) in length, it is the ninth-busiest line of the system, with 105.2 million riders in 2017. Slightly over 2 km (1.2 mi) of the line is built on an elevated viaduct with four aerial stations. In 1903, it was the location of the worst incident in the history of the Paris Métro, the fire at Couronnes.

== History ==
=== Chronology ===
- 13 December 1900: The first portion of Line 2 Nord was opened between Porte Dauphine and Étoile.
- 7 October 1902: The line was extended from Étoile to Anvers.
- 31 January 1903: The line was extended from Anvers to Bagnolet.
- 2 April 1903: The line was extended from Bagnolet to Nation.
- 10 August 1903: A short circuit on a train caused a disastrous fire that killed 84 people at Couronnes and Ménilmontant stations, leading to the adoption of massive safety improvements such as separation of power and lighting circuits within the tunnels, as well as a mandatory minimum of two passenger exits per station across the entire network.
- 14 October 1907: Line 2 Nord was renamed Line 2.

=== Works ===
On 30 March 1898 a déclaration d'utilité publique was published, recognizing the public benefit of the first six planned lines of the Paris Métro. In response, the city began rapidly constructing the first line in hopes of opening it in time for the 1900 World's Fair. During the first stage of development, three lines designated A, B, and C were planned for construction:

- A: from Porte de Vincennes to Porte Dauphine.
- B: circular route along the old city walls.
- C: from Porte Maillot to Menilmontant, using line B tracks from Étoile to Batignolles.

However, after a detailed traffic study was conducted, changes were proposed to the tracks lying west of Étoile: the segment from Étoile to Porte Maillot of Line C would be integrated into Line A; Line C would pick up the segment from Étoile to Porte Dauphine. This change allowed trains on Line B to stop at Porte Dauphine. Porte Dauphine was thus designated the terminus and origin of Line B.

Shortly thereafter, Line B was split into two lines in hopes of simplifying its use. The section from Porte Dauphine to Nation was designated as Line 2 North, while the remaining section from Nation to Étoile was designated as Line 2 South. Line 2 South would eventually become a part of Line 5, then of Line 6.

The first 1,600 metres (0.99 mi) section of Line 2 was constructed at the same time as Line 1, opening only a little later on 3 December 1900. This section consisted of three stations (Porte Dauphine, Victor Hugo and Étoile) and was circulated by rolling stock consisting of three cars each. At Étoile, trains reversed direction via a track transfer (due to it serving as only a temporary terminus), while at Porte Dauphine and Nation direction was reversed using a turnaround loop : A particularity only Lines 2 and 6 still use today.

Line 2 is also the only line of the network to employ a level crossing, despite it not being present on the passenger section of the route : at the entrance of its depot at Charonne.

== Map and stations ==
Line 2 has 25 stations.

Map of Paris Métro Line 2

=== Renamed stations ===
Date	Old name	New name
15 October 1907	Boulevard Barbès	Barbès – Rochechouart
1 August 1914	Rue d'Allemagne	Jaurès
6 October 1942	Aubervilliers	Aubervilliers – Boulevard de la Villette
19 August 1945	Combat	Colonel Fabien
10 February 1946	Aubervilliers – Boulevard de la Villette	Stalingrad
1970	Étoile	Charles de Gaulle – Étoile
13 September 1970	Bagnolet	Alexandre Dumas

== Tourism ==
Metro line 2 passes near several places of interest :

- Bois de Boulogne at Porte Dauphine
- Avenue Foch, the largest avenue in Paris, and the Arc de Triomphe at Étoile station.
  - Parc Monceau.
  - Pigalle and the Moulin Rouge.
  - Montmartre district at Pigalle and Anvers stations
  - The elevated portion of the line between Barbès – Rochechouart and Jaurès stations offers views of Paris.
  - Barbès and Belleville and their African and Asian influences.
  - Père Lachaise Cemetery.
  - Place de la Nation.

== Gallery ==
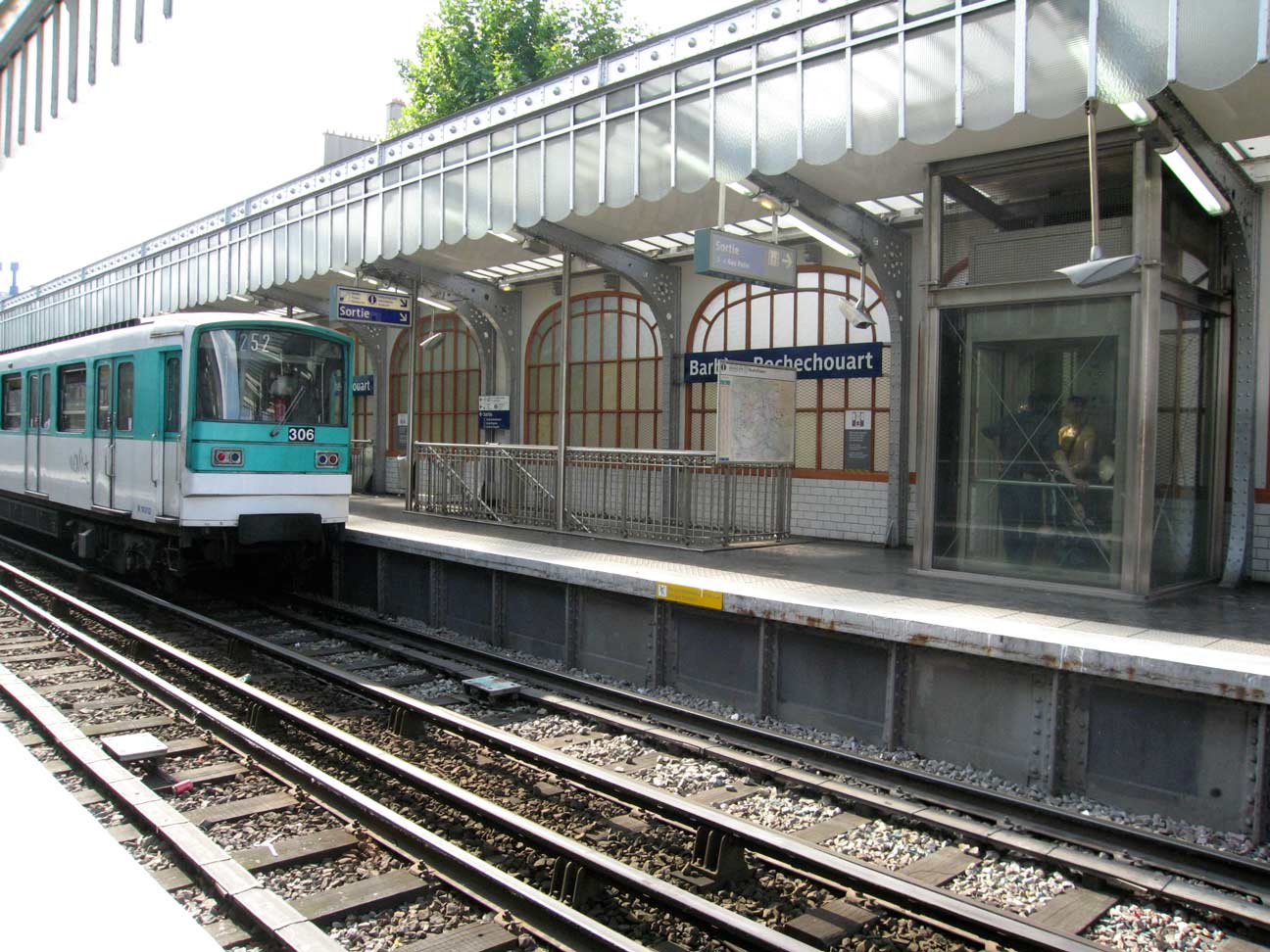
Barbès – Rochechouart

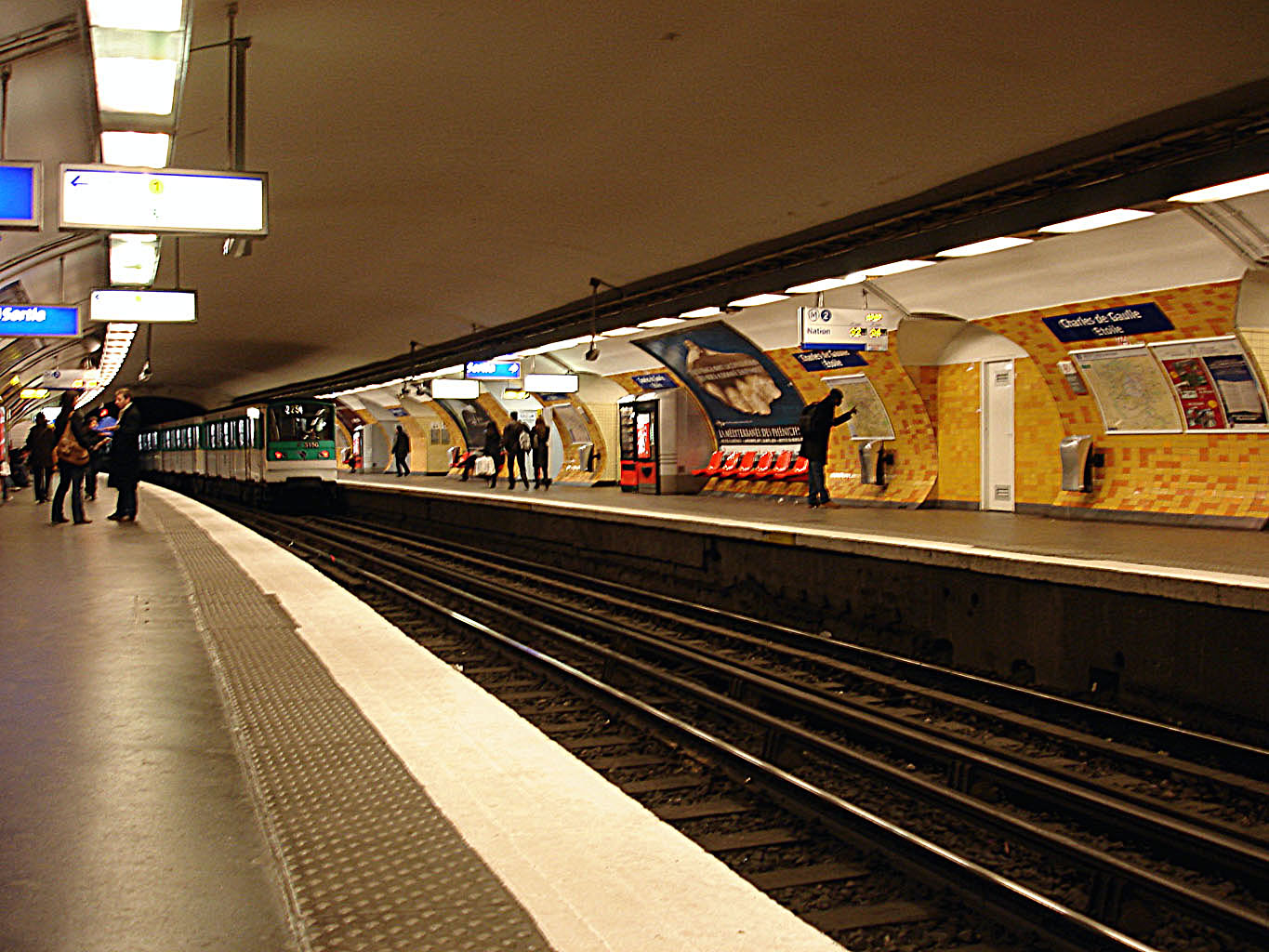
Charles de Gaulle–Étoile

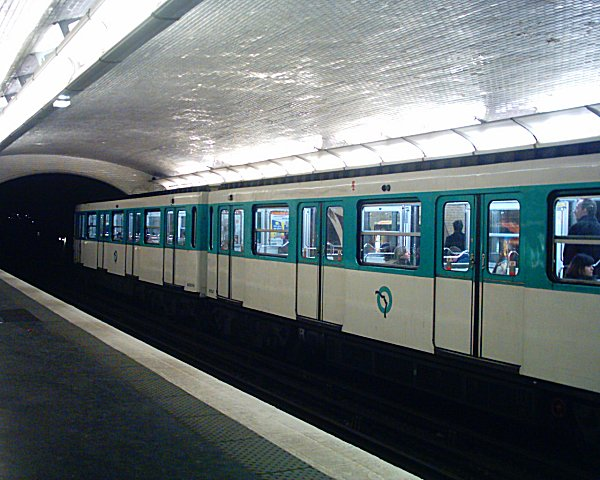
Monceau

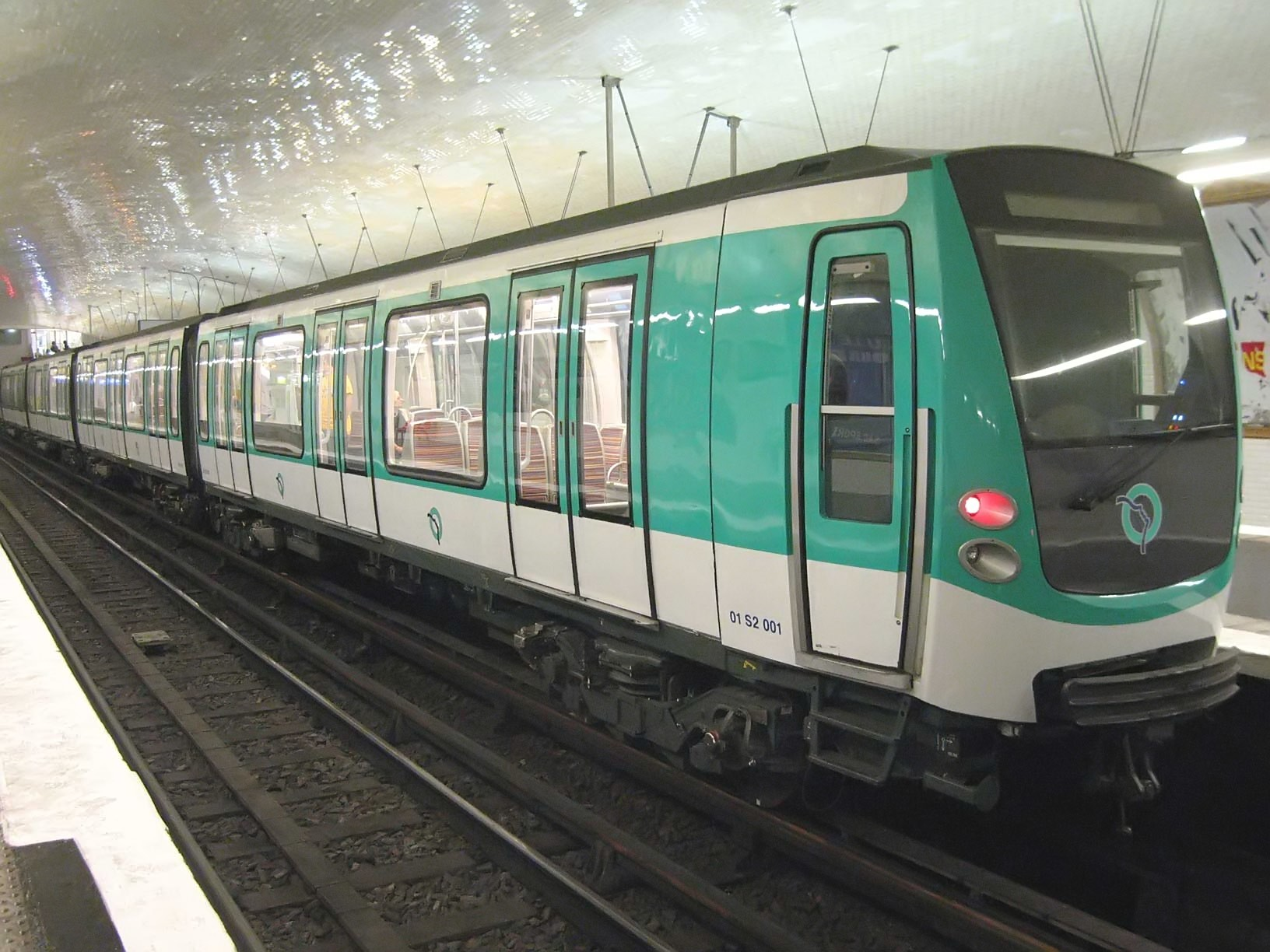
New MF 2000 train used on the route

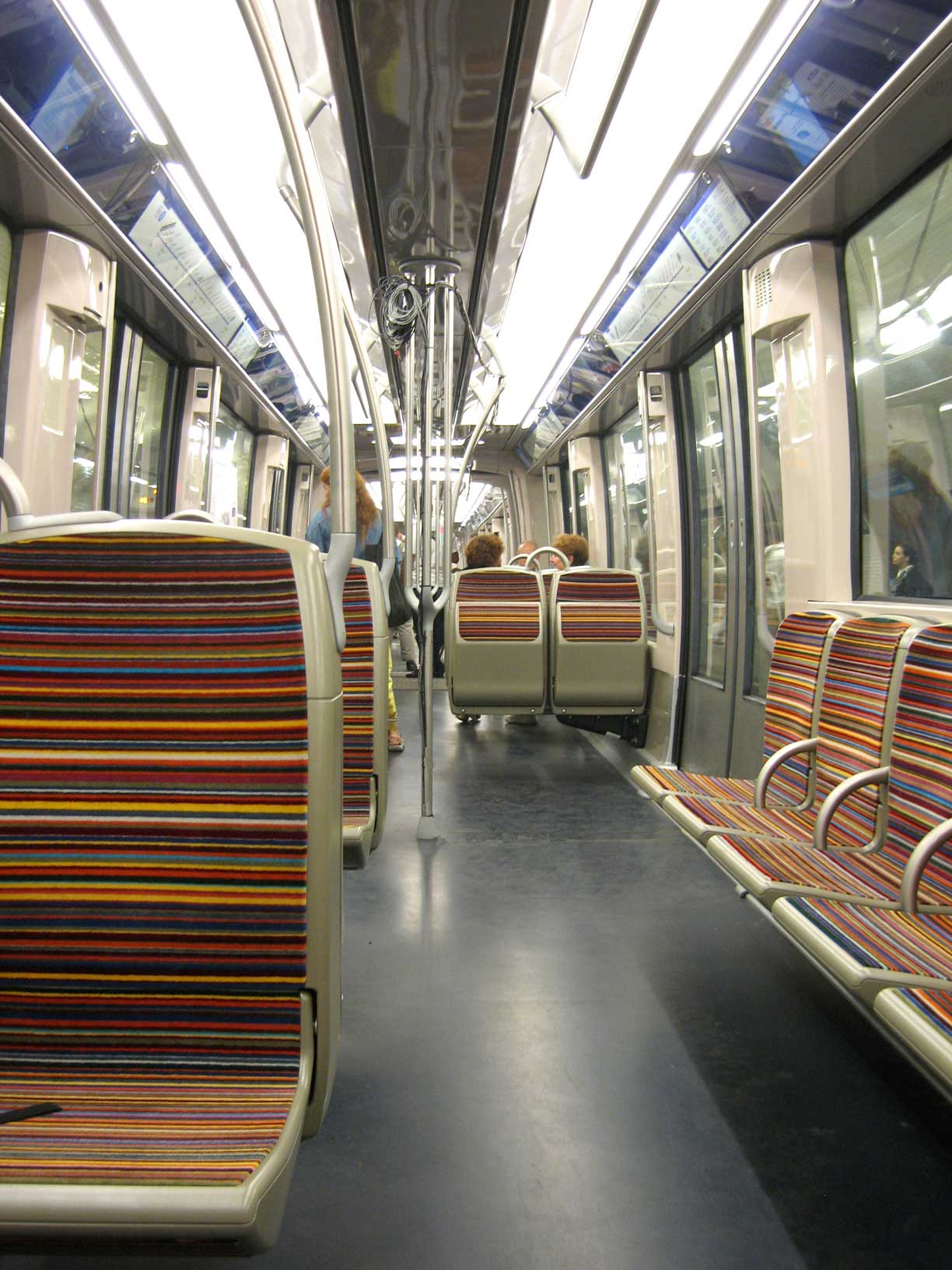
Interior of an MF 2000

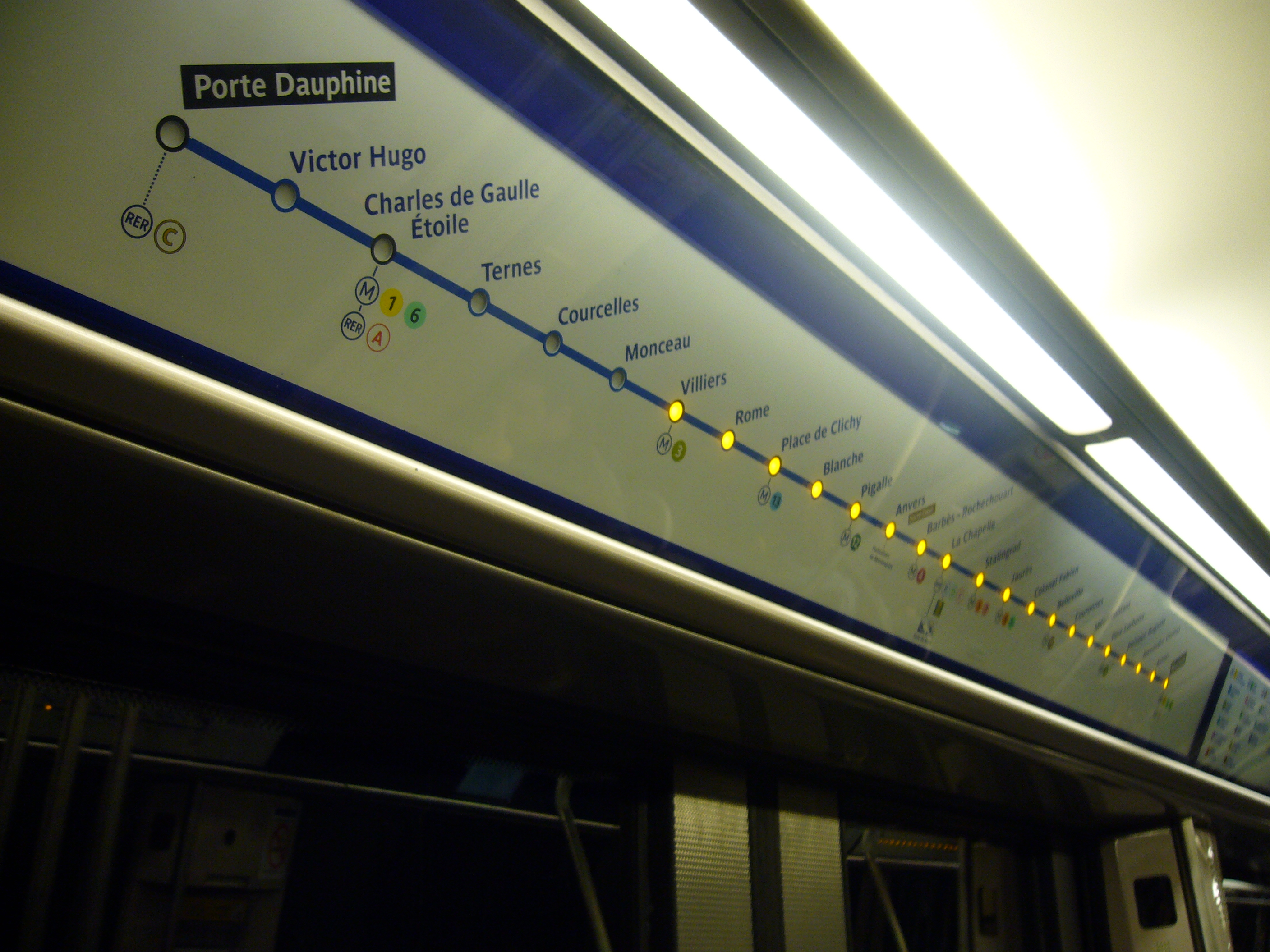
Dynamic destination display

MF 67 leaving Charles De Gaulle–Étoile

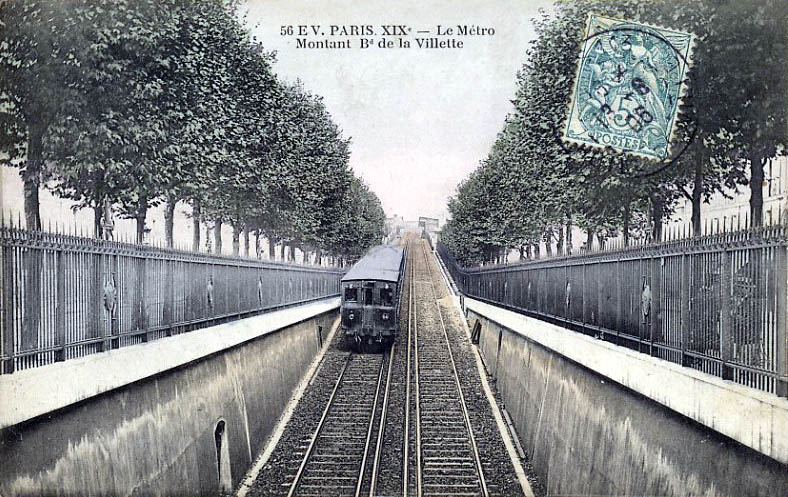
A metro car departing from Jaurès along the Boulevard de la Villette

== See also ==
- Paris
- Transport in Paris
- List of Paris Métro stations
- List of RER stations
- List of metro systems
- Rail transport in France
