= Porte Dauphine station =

Metro station in Paris, France

Porte Dauphine Maréchal de Lattre de Tassigny
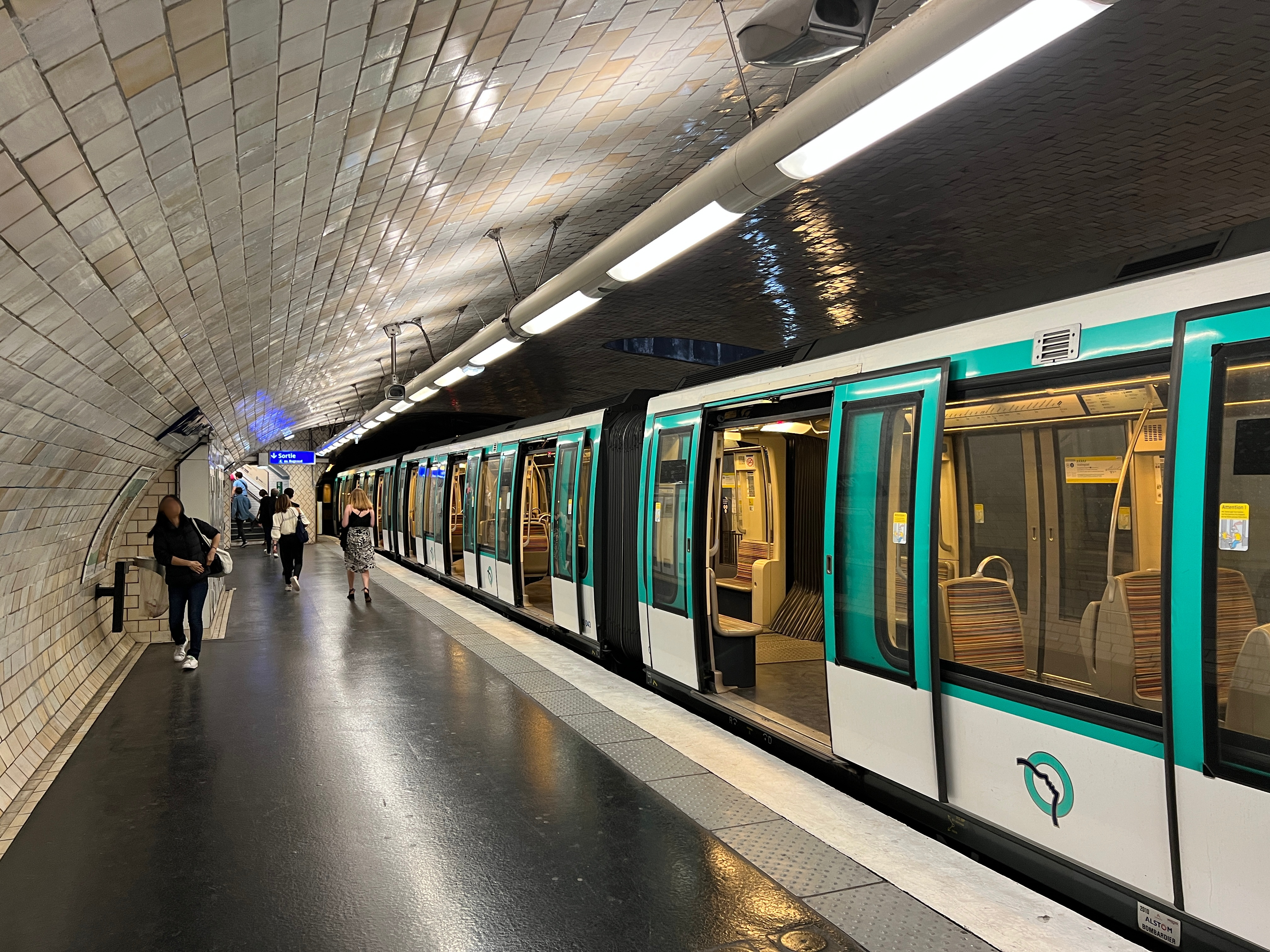
- Station view

General information
- Location: Boul. de l'Amiral Bruix × Av. Foch; Av. Foch × Av. Bugeaud; Av. Bugeaud × Av. Foch; Av. Bugeaud × Boul. Lannes; 16th arrondissement of Paris; Île-de-France; France
- Coordinates: 48°52′17″N 2°16′36″E
- Owner: RATP
- Operator: RATP
- Line: Paris Metro Paris Metro Line 2
- Platforms: 2
- Tracks: 3
- Connections: Tramways in Île-de-France Île-de-France tramway Line 3b

Construction
- Accessible: no

Other information
- Fare zone: 1

History
- Opened: 12 December 1900

Services
Preceding station	Paris Metro	Following station
Terminus	Line 2	Victor Hugo towards Nation
Preceding station	Tram	Following station
Terminus	T3b	Anna de Noailles towards Porte de Vincennes
Location
- Location within Paris

Porte Dauphine (French pronunciation: [pɔʁt dofin]; lit. 'Dauphine Gate') is the western terminus of both Line 2 of the Paris Métro and Île-de-France tramway Line T3b. It is situated in the 16th arrondissement, on the edge of the Bois de Boulogne. Avenue Foch station, served by the RER C line, is located nearby, as is Paris Dauphine University.

== Location ==
The station is established under the Place du Maréchal-de-Lattre-de-Tassigny, on a loop comprising two half-stations approximately oriented northwest/southeast. It is preceded or followed (depending on the direction) by Victor Hugo station.

== History ==
Porte Dauphine station was inaugurated on 12 December 1900 as the western terminus of the first section of line 2 Nord which will more simply become line 2 on 17 October 1907. Although Line 2 had then been completed only as far as Charles de Gaulle–Étoile, it now runs from Porte Dauphine, around the northern part of Paris, through Montmartre, around to its eastern terminus at the Place de la Nation.

It is named after Porte Dauphine, a gate in the 19th-century Thiers wall of Paris. Its subtitle honours Jean de Lattre de Tassigny (because of its location under the square of the same name), French general officer, hero of the Second World War and Companion of the Liberation, who was promoted to Marshal of France posthumously. However, this subtitle does not appear on the plans.

As part of the RATP's Un métro + beau program, the station's corridors were renovated on 31 May 2011.

In 2019, 2,932,159 travelers entered this station which placed it at the 180th position of the metro stations for its attendance of 302.

== Passenger services ==
=== Access ===
The station is famous for one of its entrances, created by Hector Guimard, registered as a historic monument by the decree of 12 February 2016 and completely restored in October 1999 for the celebrations of the centenary of the Paris metro. It has a total of four metro outlets:

- entrance 1 - Boulevard Lannes, consisting of a fixed staircase diverging into two other staircases, each decorated with a Dervaux candelabra, leading to Place du Paraguay at the right of nos. 81 and 83 of Avenue Foch;
- entrance 2 - Avenue Foch, consisting of a fixed staircase also decorated with a Dervaux mast, located north of the odd median of this avenue;
- entrance 3 - Boulevard de l'Amiral-Bruix, consisting of a fixed staircase topped with the only original Guimard kiosk with a canopy in the Art Nouveau style, located opposite the Place des Généraux-de-Trentinian on the even side of the Avenue Foch;
- entrance 4 - Avenue Bugeaud, consisting of a fixed staircase allowing only an exit and equipped with a more modest Guimard entourage (also classified as a historic monument), leading to the angle formed by this avenue and the odd alley of Avenue Foch, to the right of no. 77 of the latter.

=== Station layout ===
Street Level

B1	Mezzanine for platform connection

Westbound (drop-off) platform	Side platform, doors will open on the right
Westbound (drop-off) platform	Platform 1	← termination platform
Westbound (drop-off) platform	Platform 3	siding, no regular service
Eastbound platform	Platform 4	toward Nation (Victor Hugo) →
Eastbound platform	Island platform, doors will open on the left for platform 2, right for platform 4
Eastbound platform	Platform 2	toward Nation (Victor Hugo) →

- Note: The station is on a loop, so the westbound/drop-off and eastbound platforms are slightly offset.

=== Platforms ===
Porte Dauphine is a station with a particular configuration. It is made up of two diverging half-stations, each in its own tunnel, joined by a very tight turning loop, only 30 metres (98 ft) in radius, in accordance with its original "racket" (en raquette) layout, which is the only one on the network to be fully preserved. The arrival half-station to the north has two central tracks, the northern one serving a single side platform, while the southern one, a dead-end to the west without a platform, is used as a siding and runs alongside technical rooms. The half-station for departure is made up of two tracks separated by an island platform; on the north side is a dead-end to the west, which is also used as a depot siding, while the south side receives trains from the reversing loop. The vault is elliptical in both cases.

The station is also one of only two in the network, along with Porte de Vincennes on line 1, to have preserved its original decoration in flat cream-coloured tiles, which was one of the experimental decorations tested in 1900 before the famous bevelled white tile was selected for other parts of the network. This tiling covers the walls, the vault and the tunnel exits. Lighting is provided by a tube strip in each half station. The platforms are free of advertisements and the name of the station is inscribed on enamel plaques, in capital letters or in Parisine font depending on the location. The boarding platform has benches made of wooden slats painted red.

=== Architecture ===
The station contains one of the three remaining "dragonfly" roofed Métro entrances by Hector Guimard (1867–1942), the Art Nouveau architect who was originally commissioned by the Compagnie du Métropolitain de Paris (CMP) in 1899 to design the entrances for the Métro stations. It is the only roofed entrance that is original, not reconstructed, and on its original site. It was restored in 1999.

=== Other connections ===
The station is connected by public road to the Avenue Foch station located on RER C. It is also served by the Paris tramway Line 3b, whose extension to Porte Dauphine opened on 5 April 2024, and by the PC line of the RATP Bus Network.

== Gallery ==
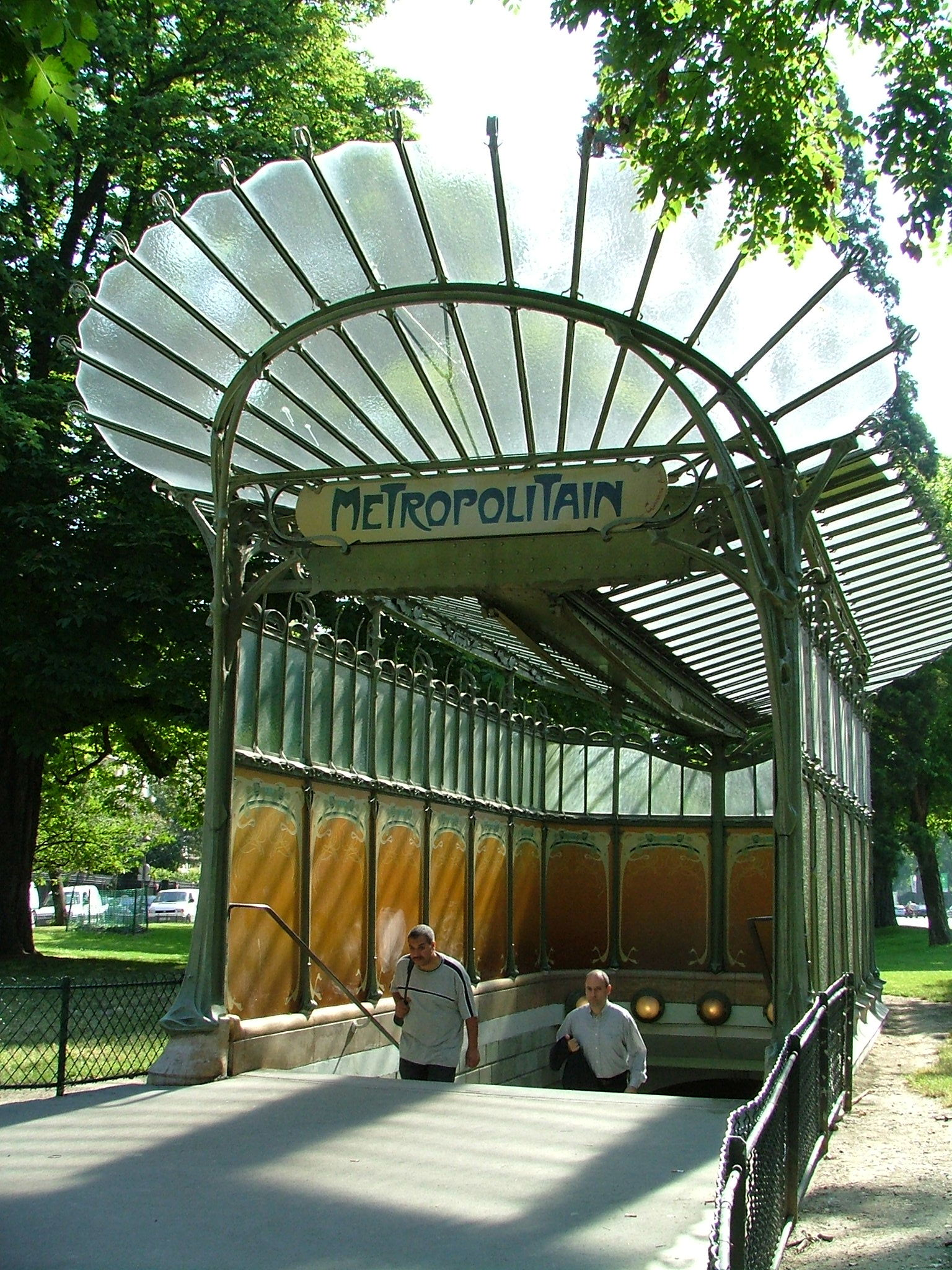
"Dragonfly" Art Nouveau entrance designed by Hector Guimard

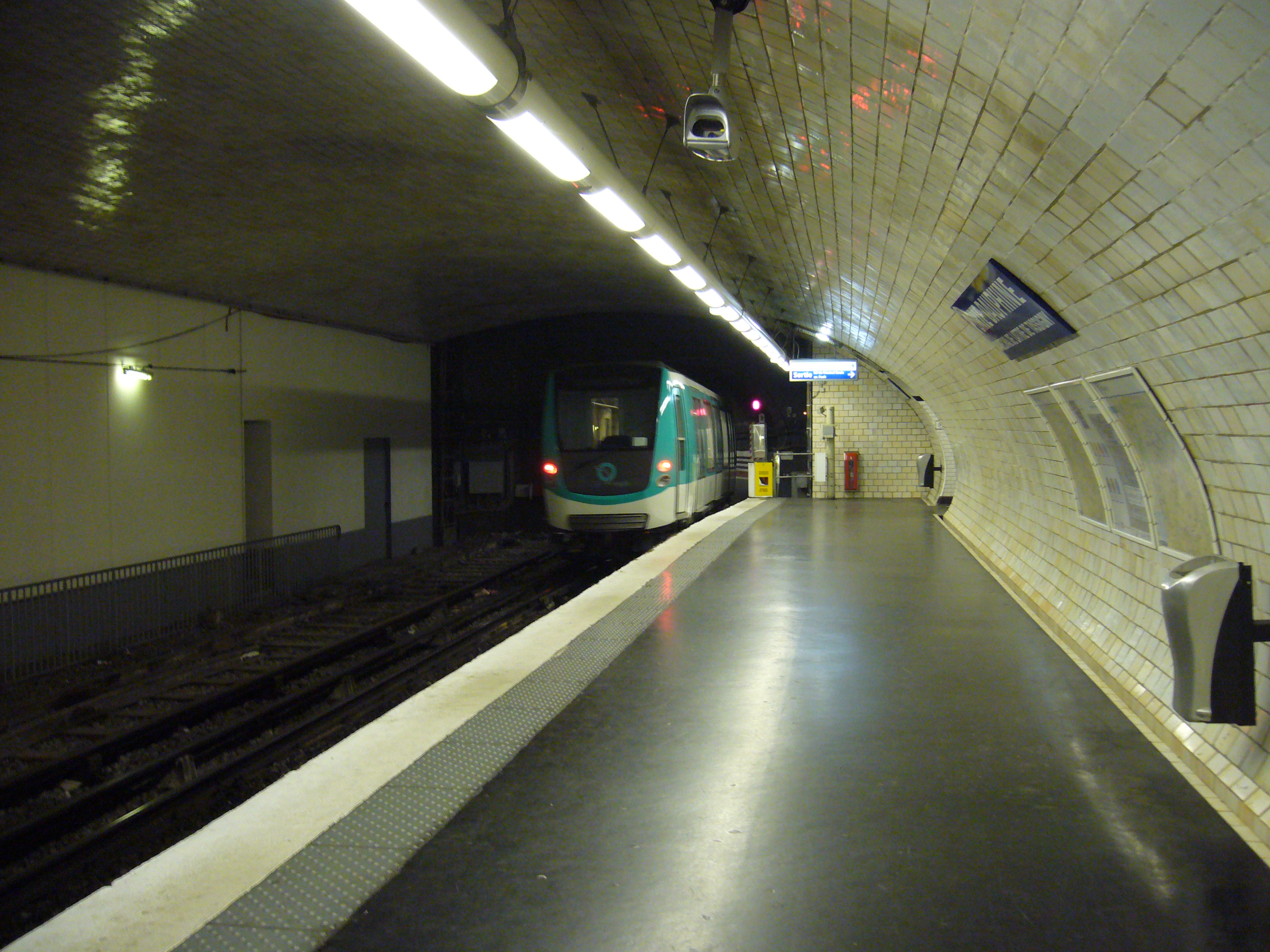
MF 2000 rolling stock arriving at Porte Dauphine

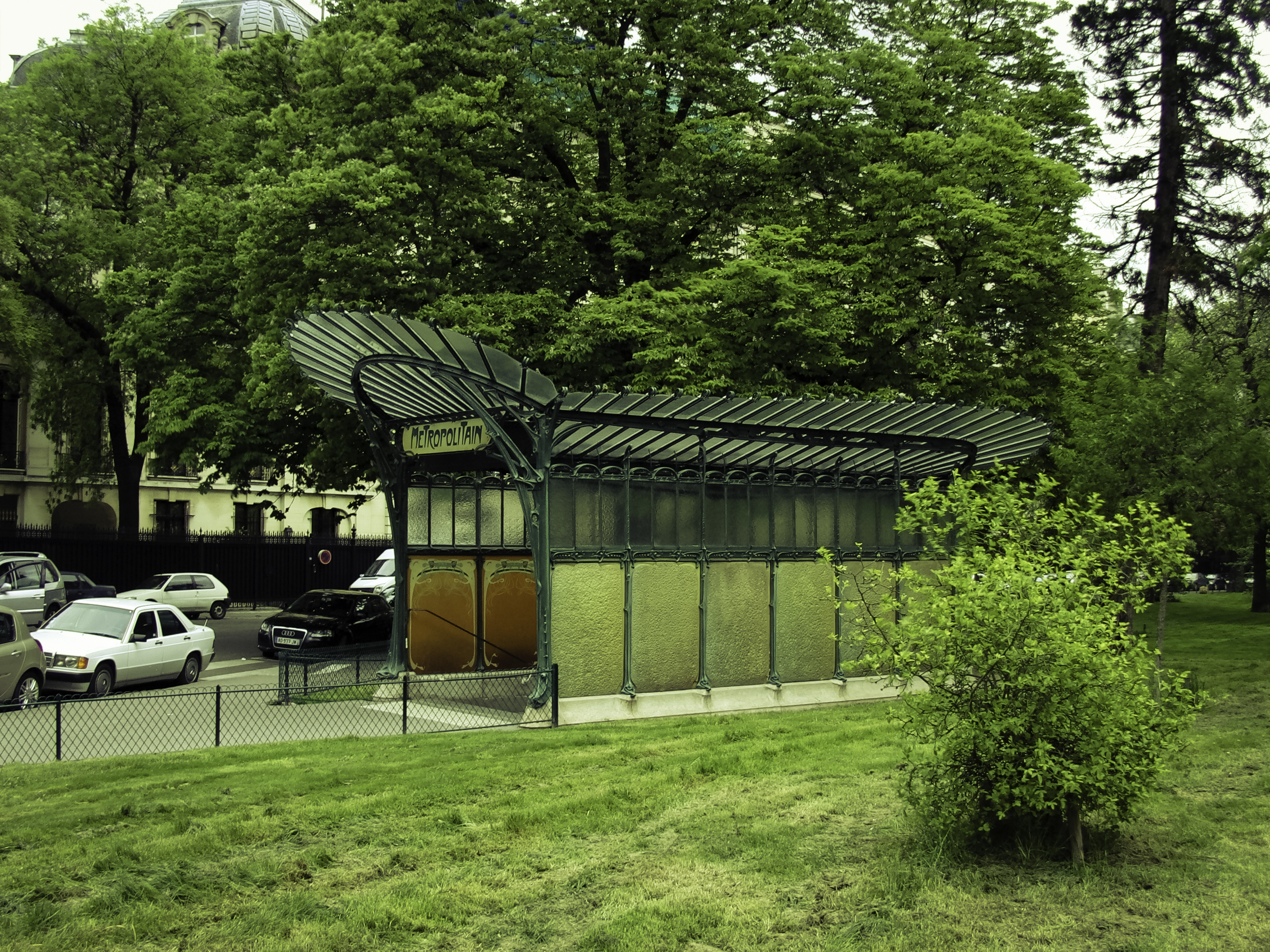
Porte Dauphine station, designed by Hector Guimard

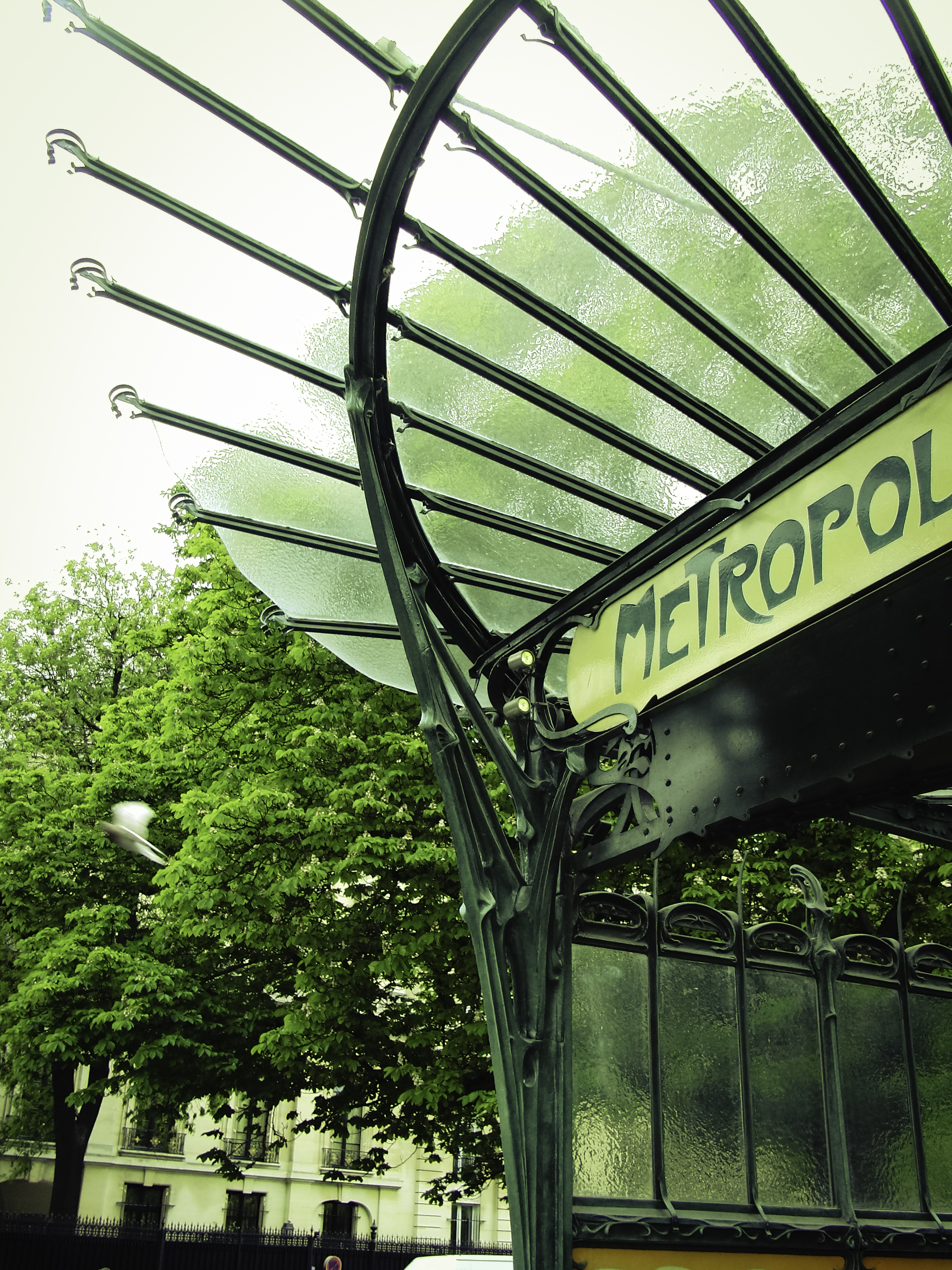
Porte Dauphine station, designed by Hector Guimard

== See also ==
- List of stations of the Paris Métro
