= Ternes station =

Metro station in Paris, France

Ternes
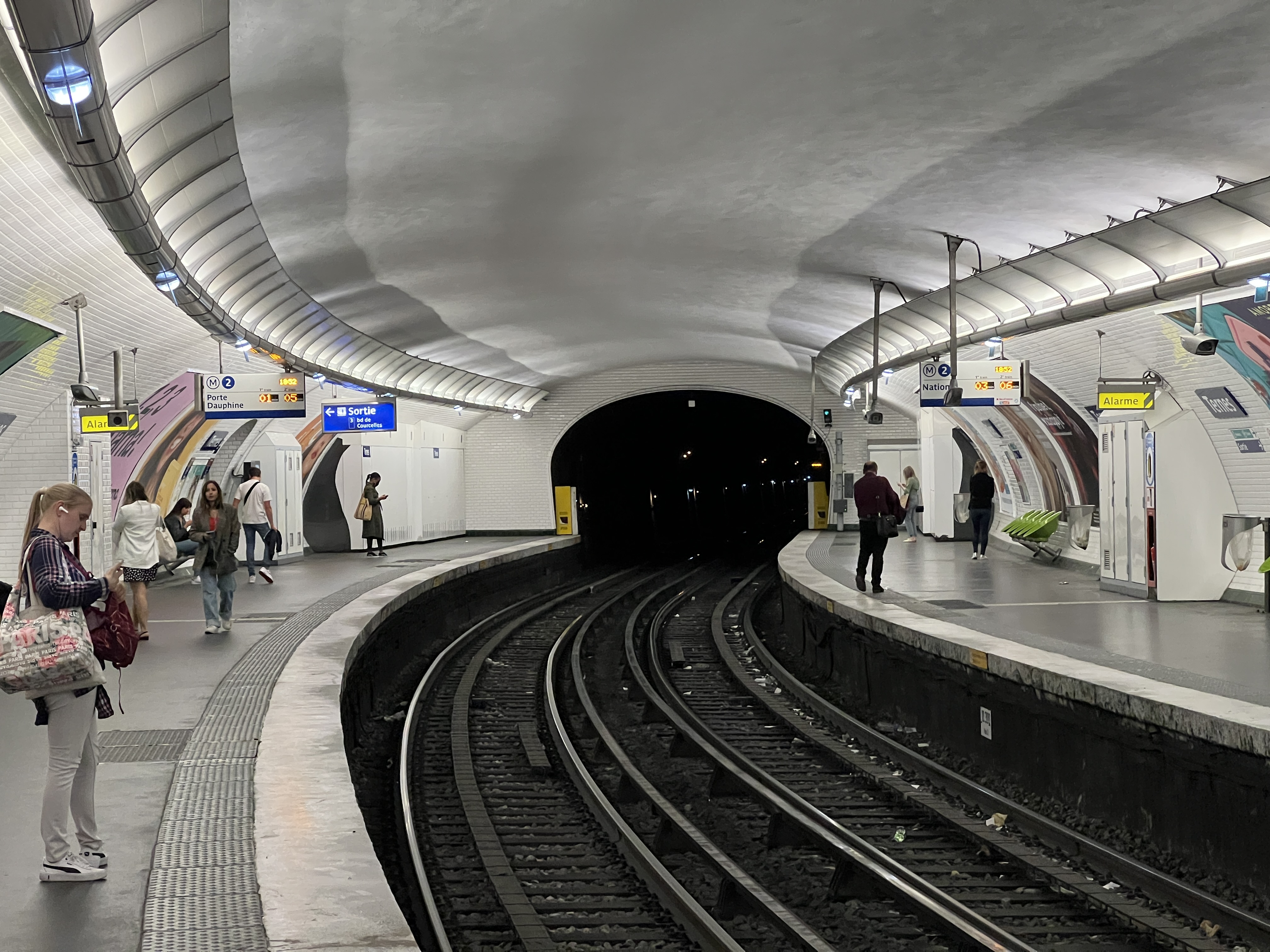

General information
- Location: Place des Ternes; 3, Place des Ternes; 130, Boulevard de Courcelles; 8th arrondissement of Paris; Île-de-France; France
- Coordinates: 48°52′40″N 2°17′55″E
- Owner: RATP
- Operator: RATP

Other information
- Fare zone: 1

History
- Opened: 7 October 1902

Services
Preceding station	Paris Metro	Following station
Charles de Gaulle–Étoile towards Porte Dauphine	Line 2	Courcelles towards Nation
Location
- Location within Paris

Ternes (French pronunciation: [tɛʁn]) is a station on Line 2 of the Paris Métro, under the Place des Ternes on the border between the 8th and 17th arrondissements.

== Location ==
The station is set up in a curve under Place des Ternes, between the southern section of Avenue de Wagram and the outlet of Boulevard de Courcelles. Oriented along a northeast–southwest axis, it is located between the Charles de Gaulle–Étoile and Courcelles Métro stations.

== History ==
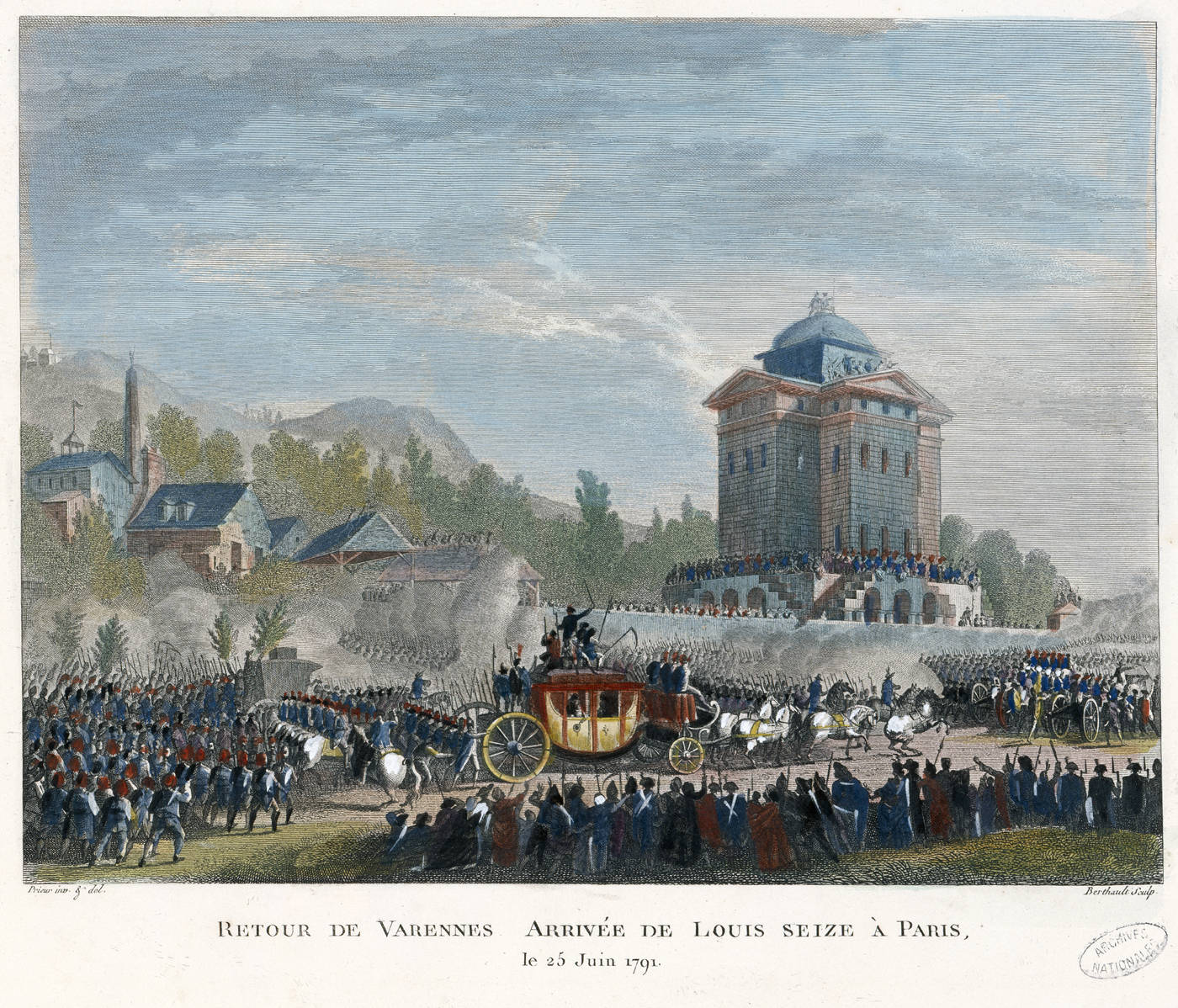
Barrière du Roule or Ternes of the Wall of the Farmers-General in 1791

The station was opened on 7 October 1902 as part of the extension of Line 2 Nord from Étoile to Anvers. It became simply line 2 on 17 October 1907. The name of the street derives from Villa Externa (Latin for "external house"), a medieval farm and residence of the Bishop of Paris outside the city, that became the name of the locality, which was originally part of Saint-Denis, then Neuilly, and was finally annexed by Paris in 1860.

The Barrière des Ternes was a gate (also known as the Barrière du Roule) at the same location built for the collection of taxation as part of the Wall of the Farmers-General; the gate was built between 1784 and 1788 and demolished in 1859.

From the 1950s until 2007, the pedestals were covered with metallic camber with blue horizontal uprights and illuminated golden advertising frames, then completed with "shell" seats characteristic of the "Motte" style, in white.

As part of the RATP Renouveau du métro program, the station's corridors were renovated on 21 December 2001, then around 2008, the platforms renovation lead to the removal of their metalwork.

In 2019, 3,329,214 travelers entered this station which placed it at 153rd position of metro stations for its usage out of 303 metro stations.

== Passenger services ==
=== Access ===
The station has three entrances:

- entrance 1: Place des Ternes, consisting of a fixed staircase decorated with a Guimard entrance classified as a historic monument by a decree on 25 July 1965, leading to the central reservation on Place des Ternes;
- entrance 2: Avenue des Ternes, consisting of a fixed staircase embellished with a mast with a yellow M inscribed in a circle, located to the right of no. 3 at Place des Ternes;
- entrance 3: Boulevard de Courcelles, consisting of an escalator allowing only an exit from the platform in the direction of Porte Dauphine, located opposite no. 130 Boulevard de Courcelles.

=== Station layout ===
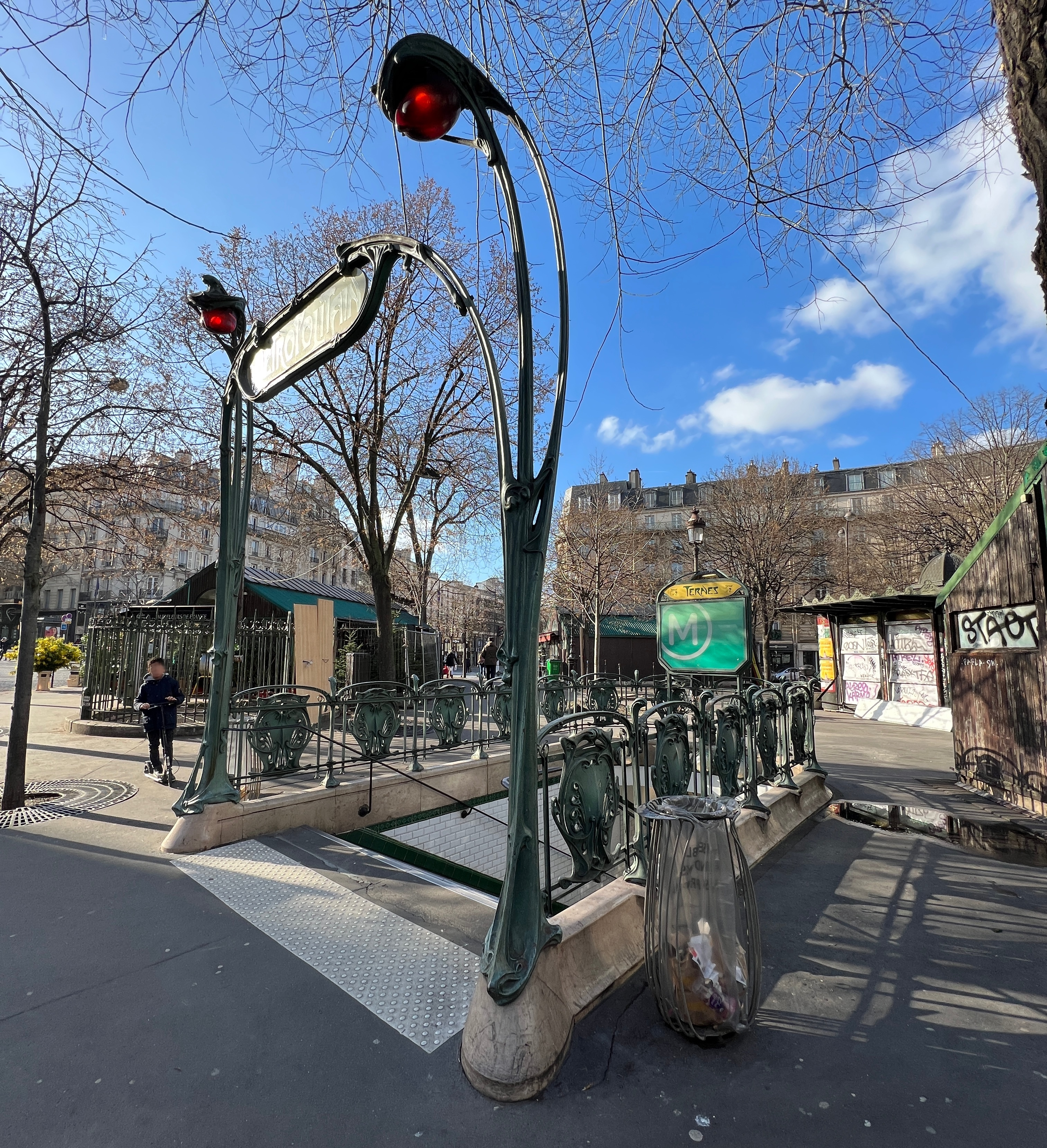
Station entrance on the Place des Ternes

G
Street Level

B1	Mezzanine for platform connection

P Platform level	Side platform, doors will open on the right
P Platform level	Platform 1	← toward Porte Dauphine (Charles de Gaulle–Étoile)
P Platform level	Platform 2	toward Nation (Courcelles) →
P Platform level	Side platform, doors will open on the right

=== Platform ===
Ternes is a standard curve station. It has two platforms separated by the metro tracks and the vault is elliptical. The decoration is in the style used for most metro stations. The lighting canopies are white and rounded in the Gaudin style of the renouveau du métro des années 2000 revival, and the bevelled white ceramic tiles cover the walls, the tunnel exits and the outlets of the corridors. The vault is coated and painted white. The advertising frames are in white ceramic and the name of the station is written in a Parisine font on enameled plates. The seats are green Akiko style.

=== Bus services ===
The station is served by lines 30, 31, and 43 of the RATP Bus Network.

== Nearby ==
- Salle Wagram
- Salle Pleyel
