= Monceau station =

Metro station in Paris, France

Monceau
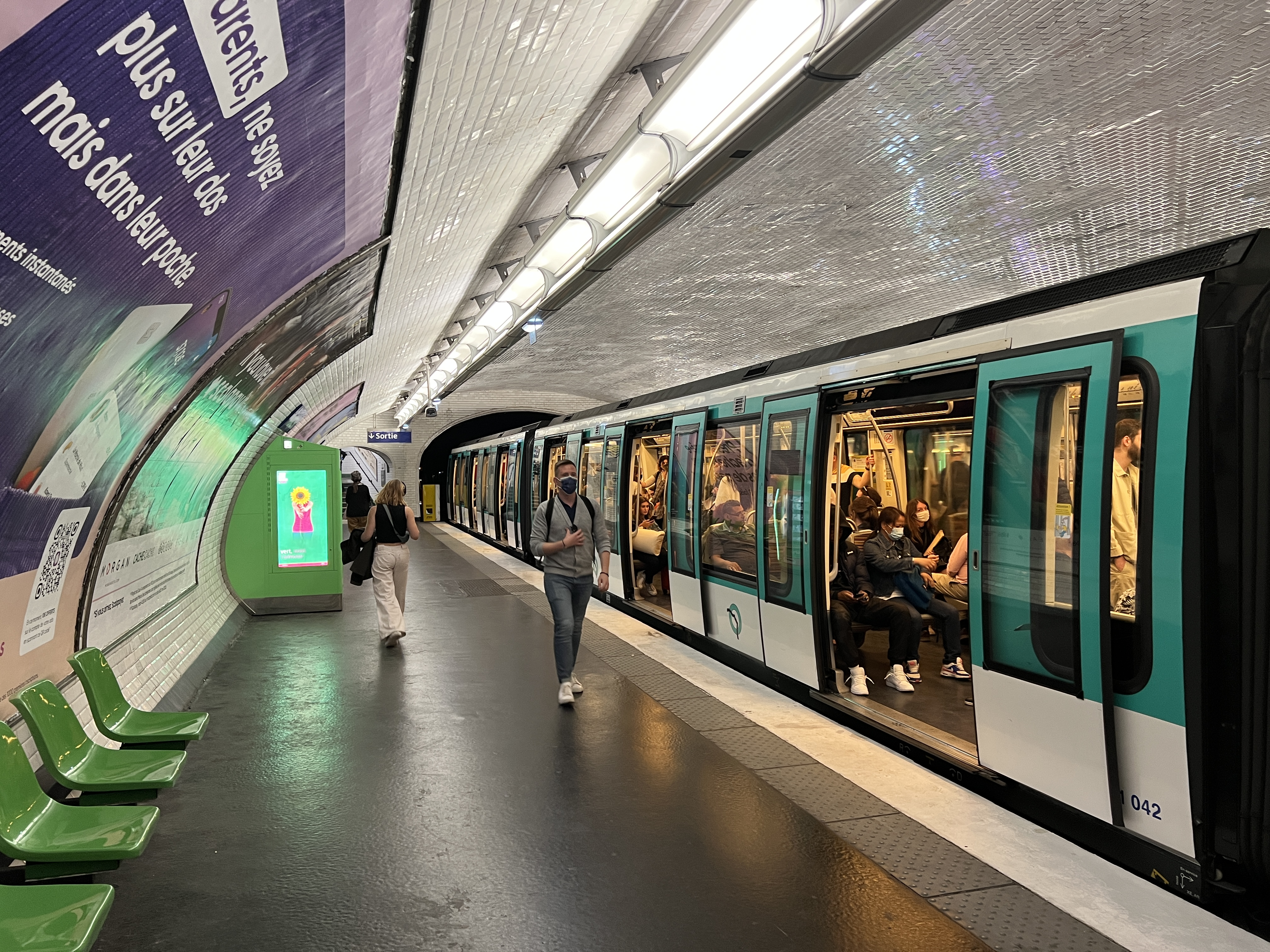

General information
- Location: 1, pl. de la République Dominicaine; 8th arrondissement of Paris; Île-de-France; France
- Coordinates: 48°52′48″N 2°18′30″E
- Owner: RATP
- Operator: RATP

Other information
- Fare zone: 1

History
- Opened: 7 October 1902

Services
Preceding station	Paris Metro	Following station
Courcelles towards Porte Dauphine	Line 2	Villiers towards Nation
Location
- Location within Paris

Monceau (French pronunciation: [mɔ̃so]) is a station on Paris Métro Line 2 near the Parc Monceau on the border of the 8th and 17th arrondissement of Paris.

== Location ==
The station is located under the Boulevard de Courcelles at the Place de la République-Dominican, on the edge of the Parc Monceau. Oriented approximately along an east–west axis, it intersects between Courcelles and Villiers stations.

== History ==
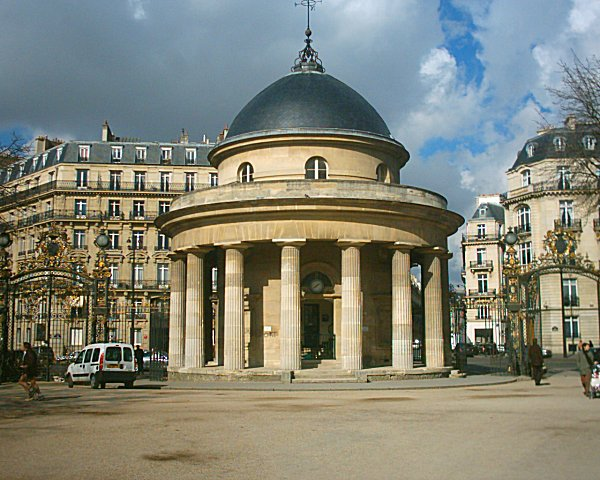
Rotunda, Parc Monceau, built as part of the Barrière de Chartres of the Wall of the Farmers-General

The station was opened on 7 October 1902 as part of the extension of line 2 Nord from Étoile to Anvers and became simply line 2 on 17 October 1907. The station and the park derive their name from a village in this area that was annexed by Paris in 1860. The Barrière de Chartres, a gate built in 1790 for the collection of taxation as part of the Wall of the Farmers-General, was at the same location. The Monceau park of the same name is an acquisition of Philippe d'Orléans in 1778.

Close to Parc Monceau is the Musée Cernuschi (Asian art music) and the Musée Nissim de Camondo (museum of furniture and other household furnishings), and Musée national Jean-Jacques Henner (dedicated to the works of painter Jean-Jacques Henner).

As part of the RATP Renouveau du métro program, the station corridors and platform lighting were renovated on 20 March 2002.

On 1 April 2016, half of the nameplates on the station's platforms were replaced by the RATP to produce an April Fool for a day, as in twelve other stations. Monceau was humorously renamed Ma pelle.

In 2019, 1,672,269 travelers entered this station which placed it at 269th position for the metro stations for its usage out of 303.

== Passenger services ==
=== Access ===
The station has a single entrance named Place de la République-Dominicaine, leading to the south sidewalk of Boulevard de Courcelles near the Barrière de la Rotonde de Chartres, which marks the entrance to Parc Monceau on the said square. Made up of a fixed staircase, it is adorned with a Guimard entrance, which was the subject of a decree as a historic monument on 12 February 2016.

=== Station layout ===
G Street Level
M	Mezzanine for platform connection
P Platform level	Side platform, doors will open on the right
P Platform level	Platform 1	← toward Porte Dauphine (Courcelles)
P Platform level	Platform 2	toward Nation (Villiers) →
P Platform level	Side platform, doors will open on the right

=== Platforms ===
Monceau is a standard configuration station. It has two platforms separated by the metro tracks and the vault is elliptical. The decoration is of the style used for most metro stations. The lighting canopies are white and rounded in the Gaudin style of the renouveau du métro des années 2000 revival, and the bevelled white ceramic tiles cover the walls, the vault and the tunnel exits. The advertising frames are metallic and the name of the station is written in Parisine font on enameled plates. The shell seats, in a green color, are typical of the Motte style.

=== Bus services ===
The station is served by line 30 of the RATP Bus Network.

== Nearby ==
- Parc Monceau
- Musée Cernuschi
- Musée Nissim de Camondo
- Portuguese Consulate in Paris
