= Musée Cernuschi =

Museum of Asian art in Paris

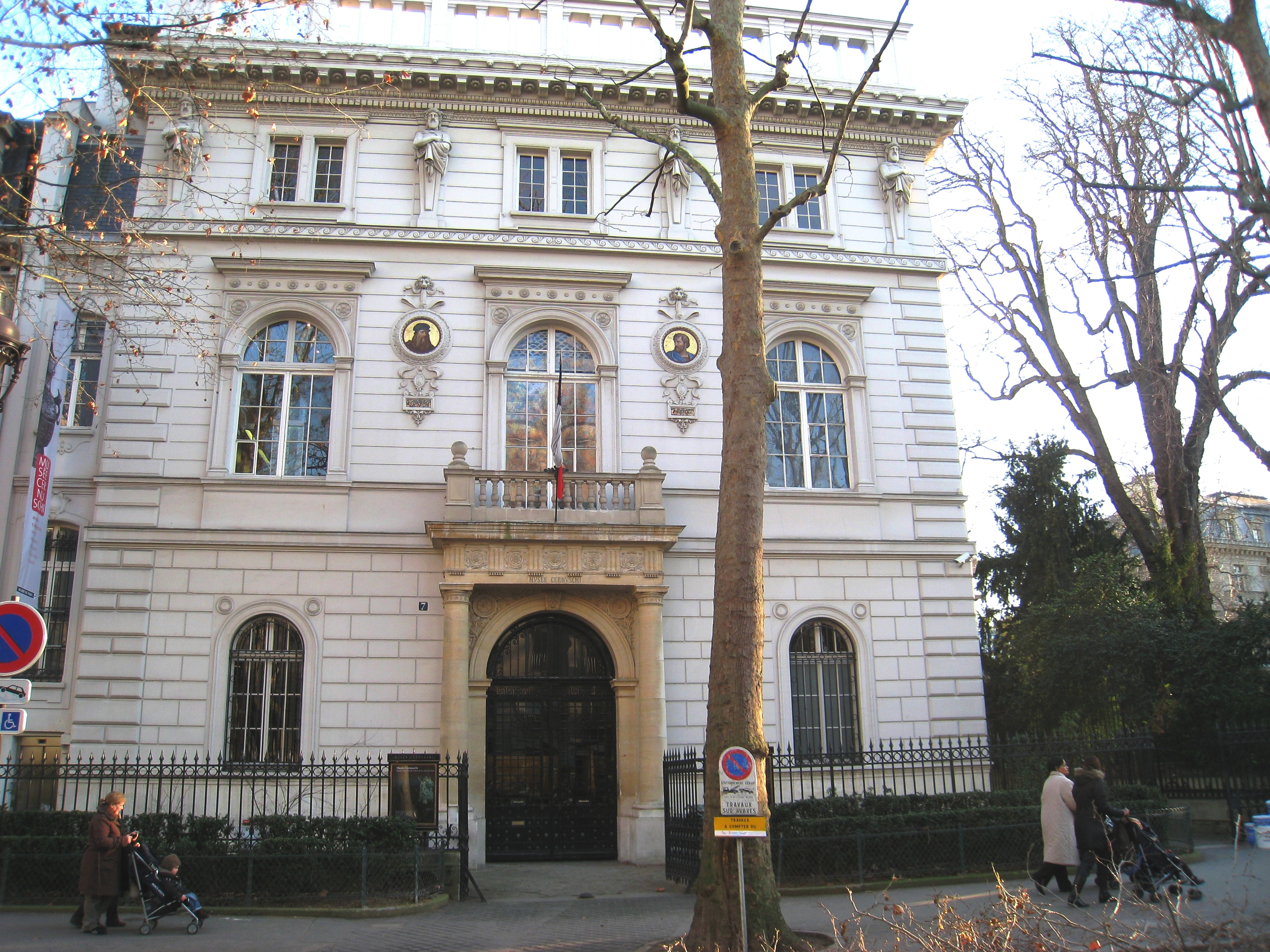
- Exterior view

- Location within Paris
- Established: 1898; 128 years ago
- Location: 7 avenue Vélasquez, 8th arrondissement of Paris
- Coordinates: 48.88°N 2.312°E
- Type: Asian art
- Website: www.cernuschi.paris.fr/en

The Musée Cernuschi (French pronunciation: [myze tʃɛʁnuski]; 'Cernuschi Museum'), officially also the Musée des arts de l'Asie de la Ville de Paris ('Asian Arts Museum of the City of Paris'), is an Asian art museum located at 7 avenue Vélasquez, near Parc Monceau, in Paris, France. Its Asian art collection is second in Paris only to that of the Musée Guimet.

The nearest Paris Métro stops to the museum are Villiers or Monceau on Line 2.

== History ==
The museum was founded in 1898 by Henri Cernuschi (1821–1896) in the mansion that used to be his home. It describes itself as the second-oldest Asian art museum in France, and the fifth-oldest Chinese art museum in Europe.

Following a major renovation project from 2001 to 2005, during which the museum was closed, its total exhibition space reached 3,200 m^{2}. Another renovation was conducted in 2019–2020.

On 1 January 2013, the Cernuschi Museum became part of the public institution Paris Musées, together with 13 other museums belonging to the City of Paris.

== Collections ==
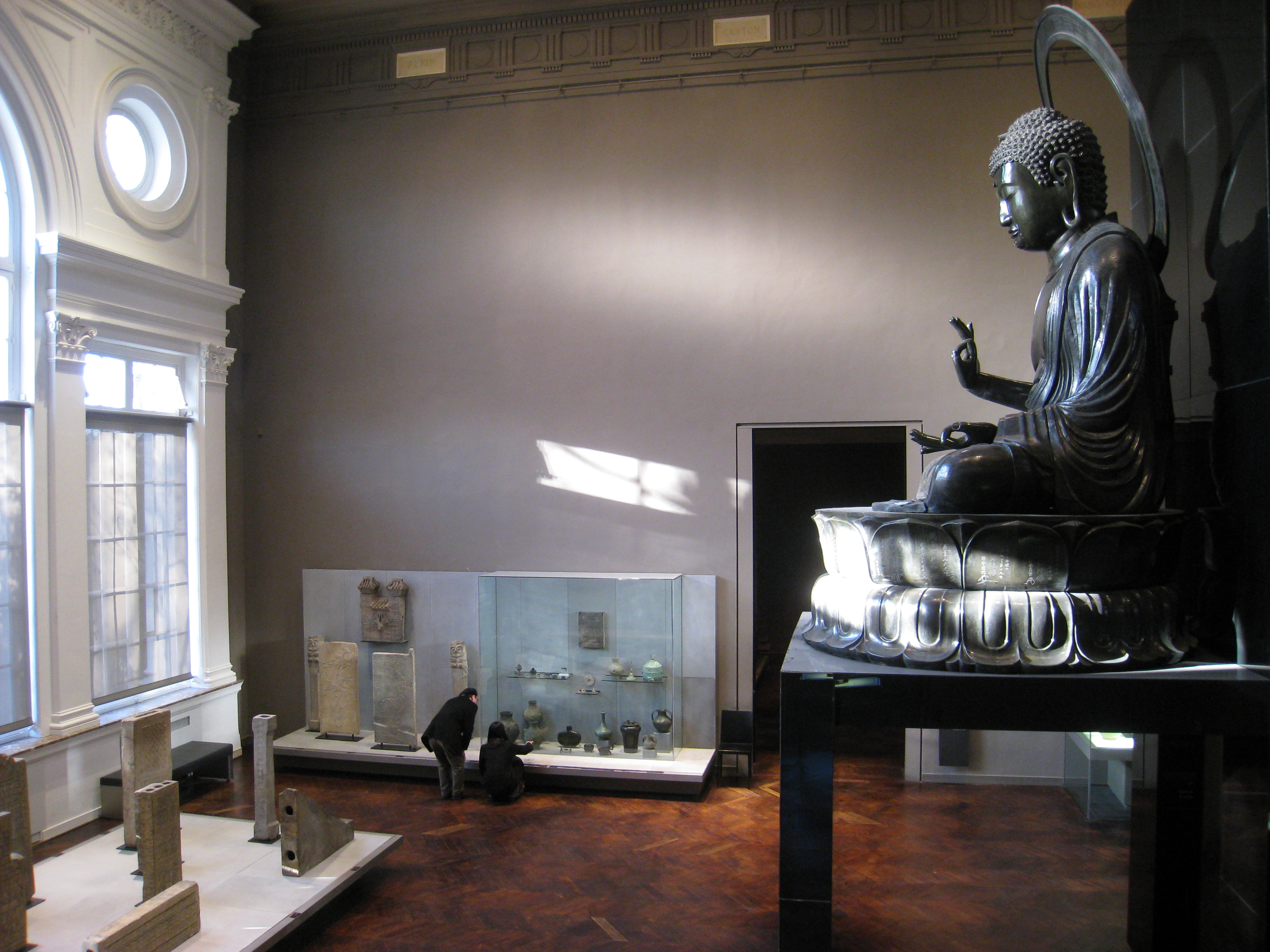
The great hall of the Musée Cernuschi

Over the years, the museum's collection has gradually grown from nearly 5,000 objects initially to about 15,000 as of 2021. Originally its collections were overwhelmingly of objects from China and Japan, which have been complemented more recently by artefacts from Korea and Vietnam. Some 900 objects are on permanent exhibition. Most prominent is the large Buddha of Meguro, a Japanese bronze from the 18th century, from the original collection of Henri Cernuschi. Other permanent exhibits include:

- a fine collection of archaic bronze pieces (15th to 3rd centuries BCE)
- Han dynasty objects (206 BCE – 220 CE)
- Funerary statues from the Northern Wei dynasty (386–534 CE) and Sui dynasty (581–618 CE)
- Tang dynasty statues (618–907 CE)
- Ceramics from the Tang and Song dynasties (6th through 13th centuries CE)
- funerary masks in gilded bronze dating from the Liao dynasty (907–1125)

== Collection highlights ==
=== China ===
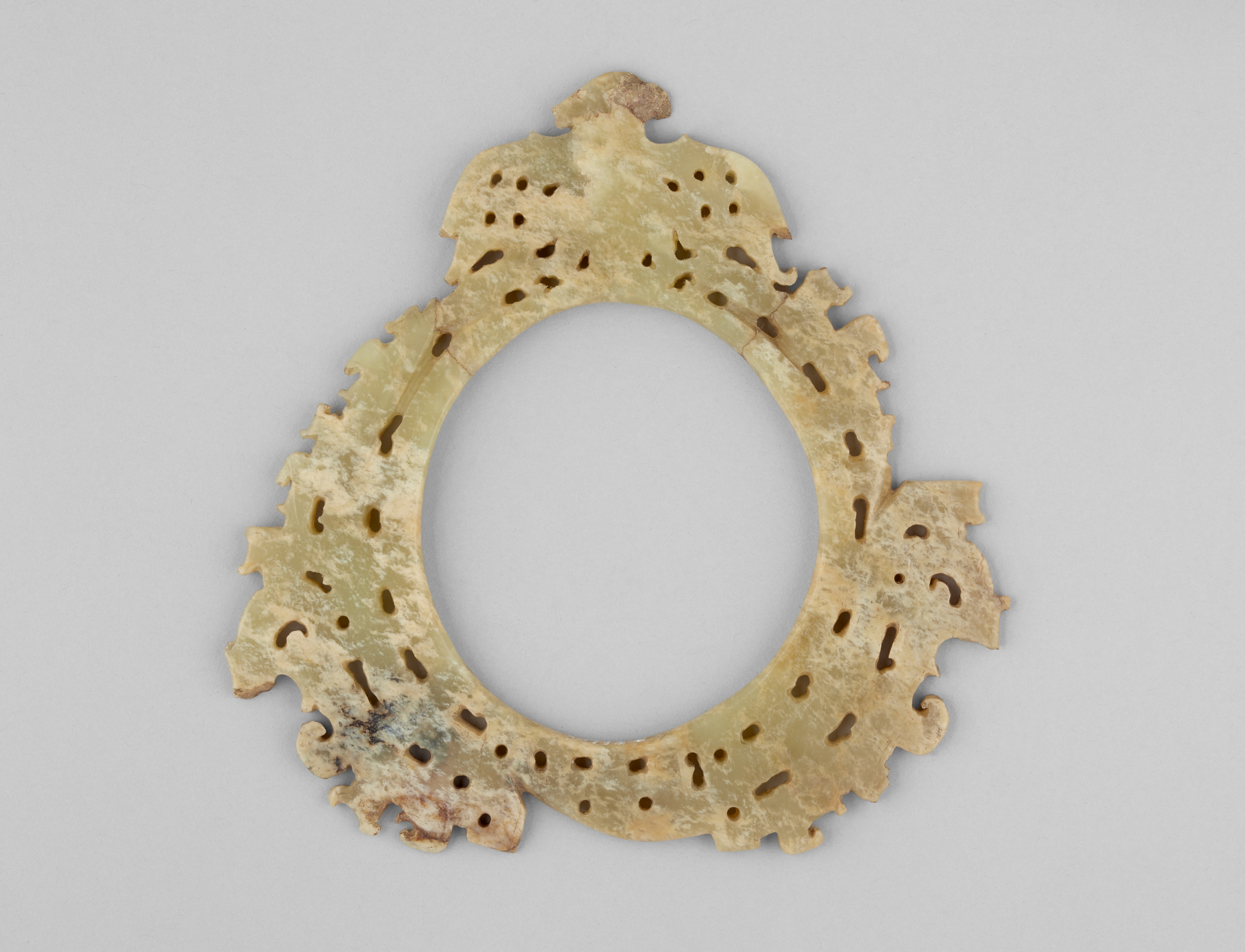
Jade disc. Shandong, 2100–1700 BCE

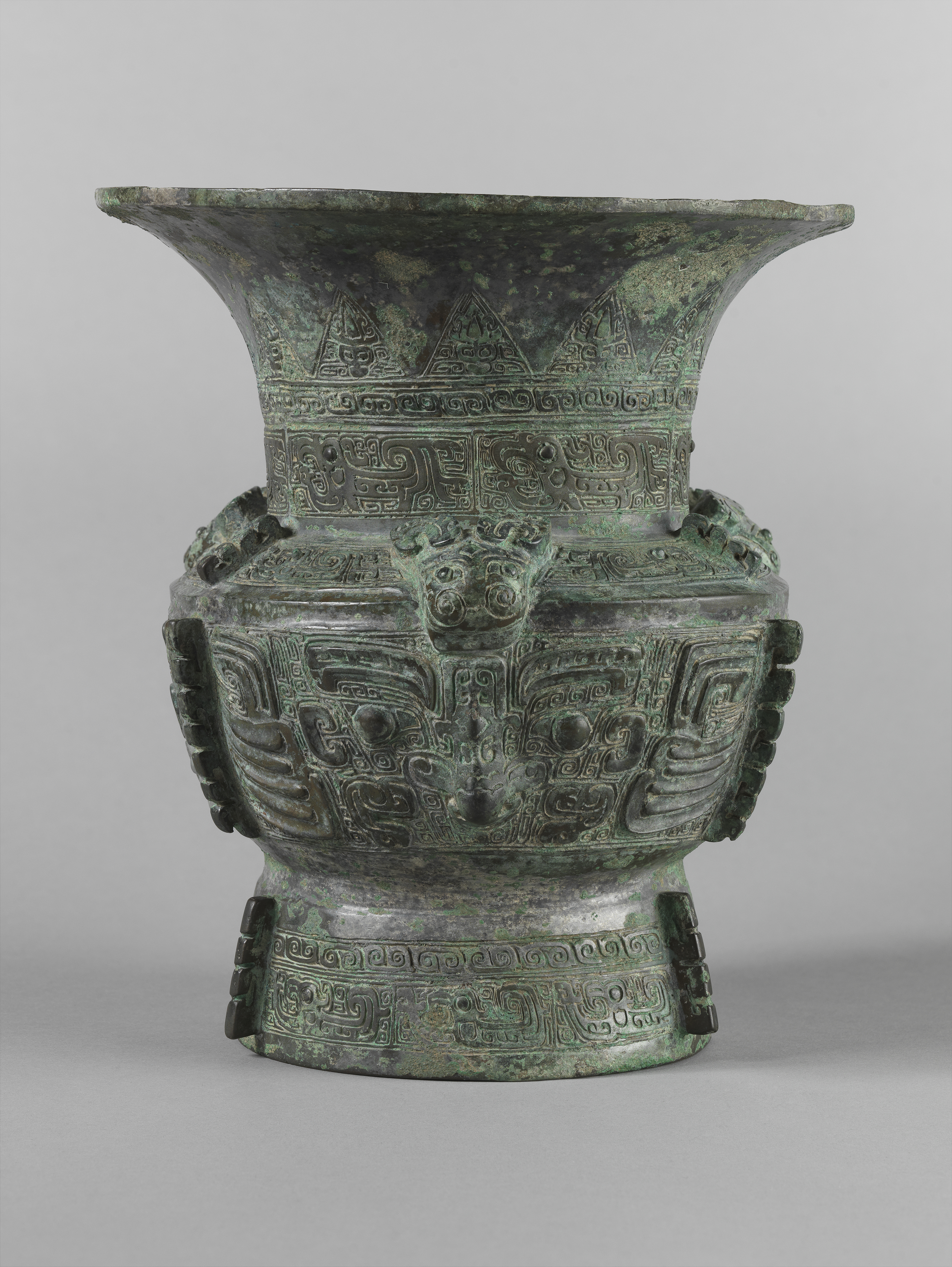
Zun vessel, Shang dynasty, 12th century BCE

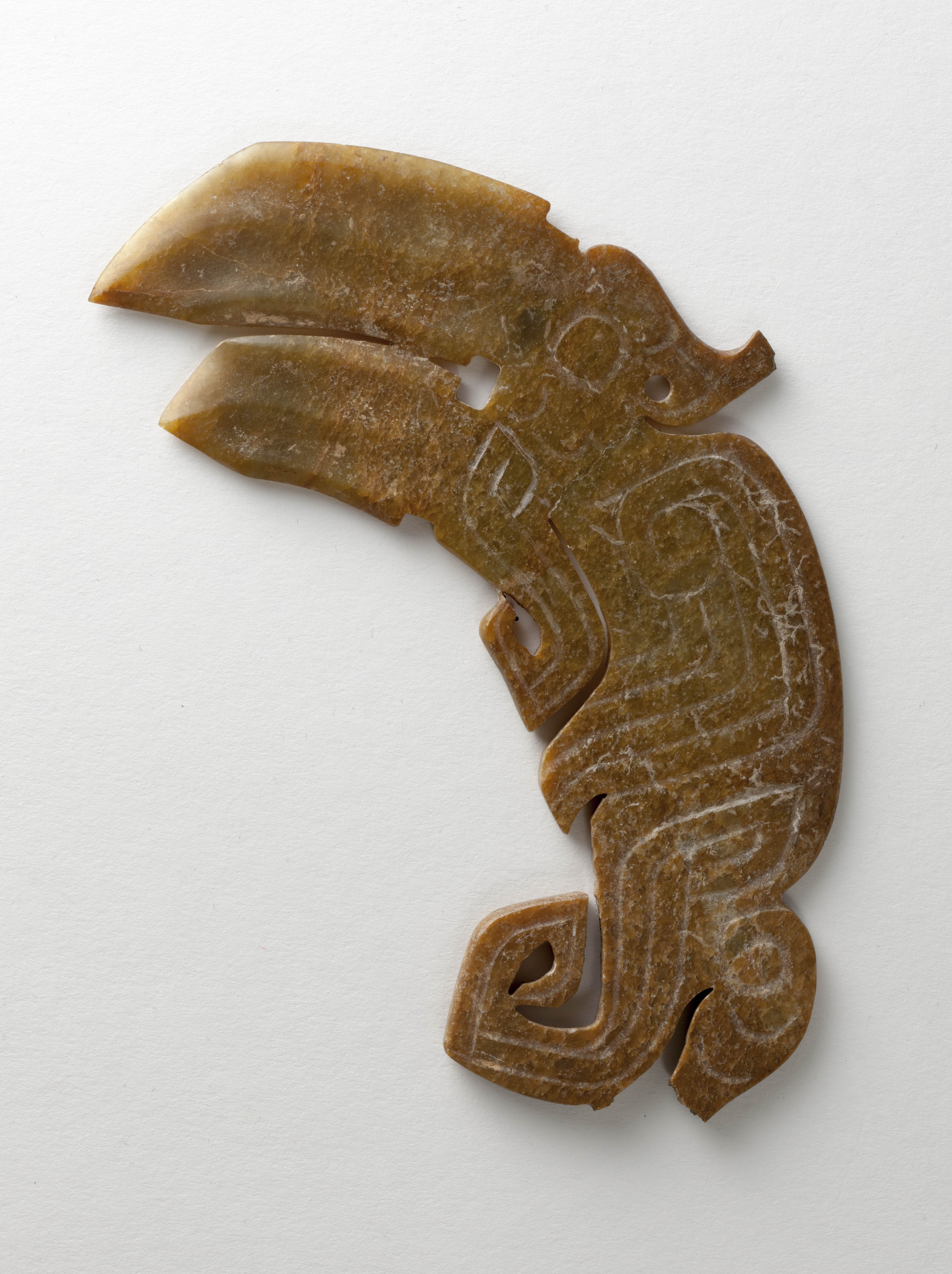
Bird-shaped jade, 11th century BCE

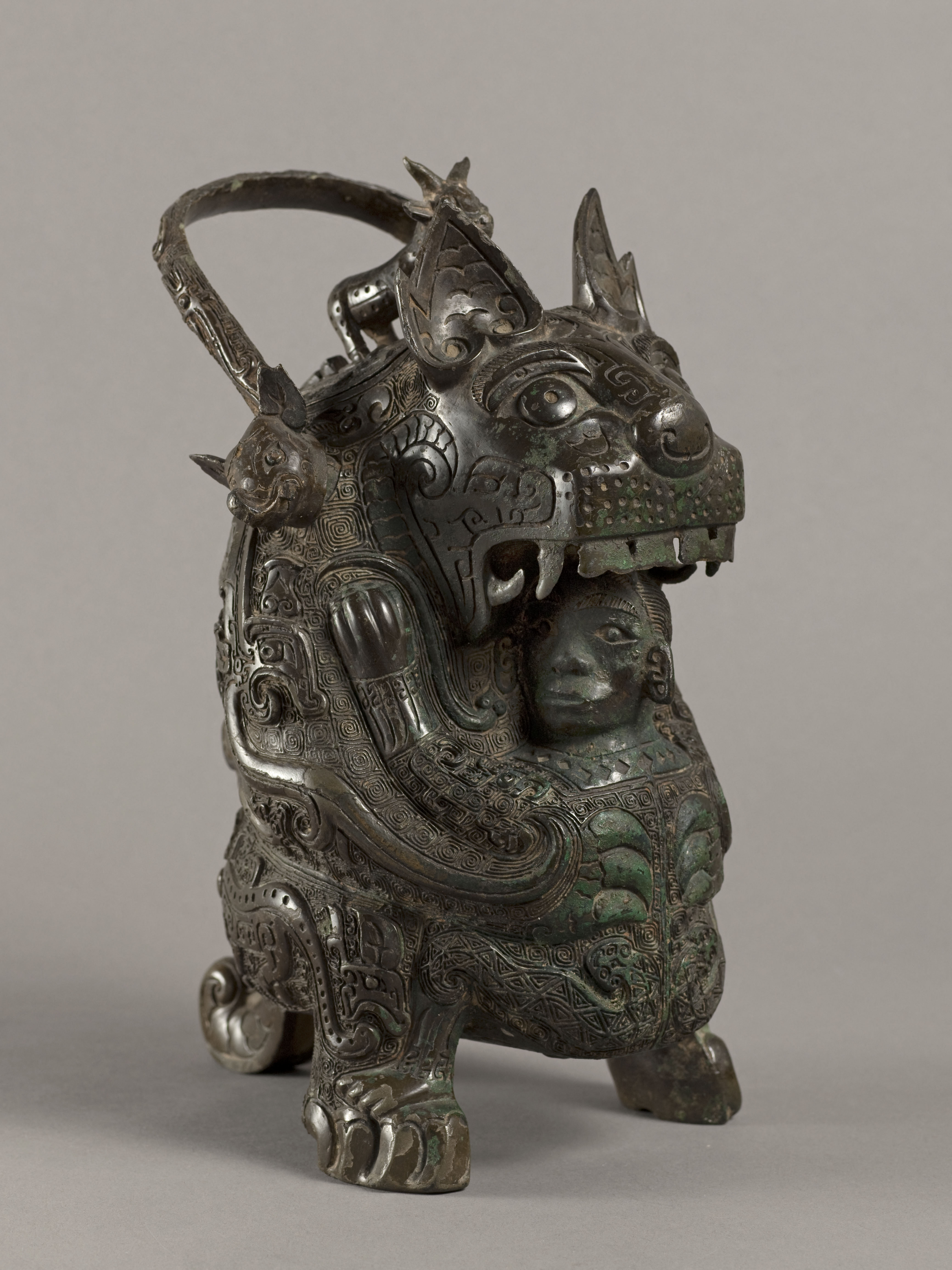
You vessel in shape of a tiger, Shang dynasty, 1100–1050 BCE

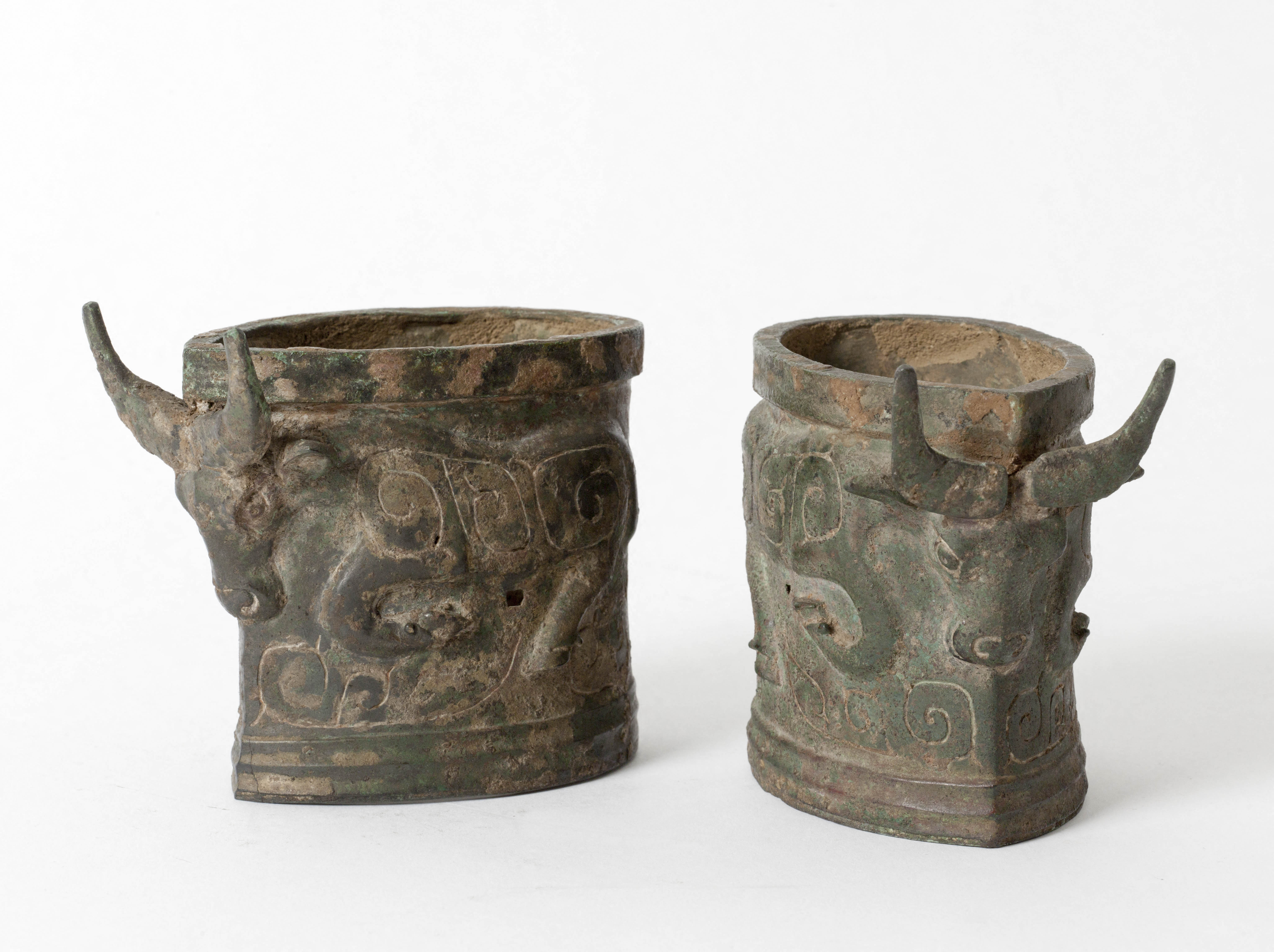
Two chariot elements, Western Zhou, 1050–771 BCE

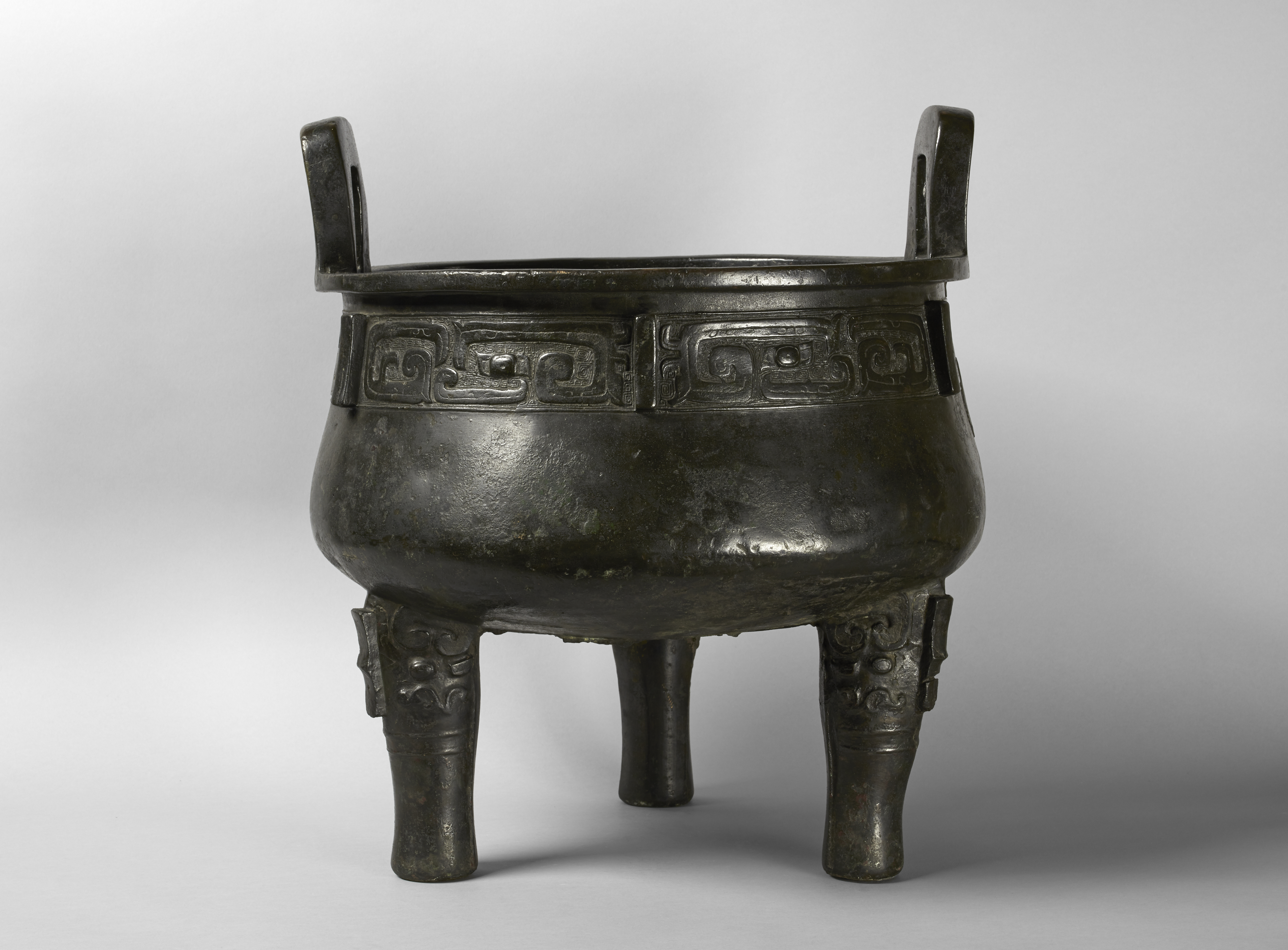
Ding vessel, 900–850 BCE

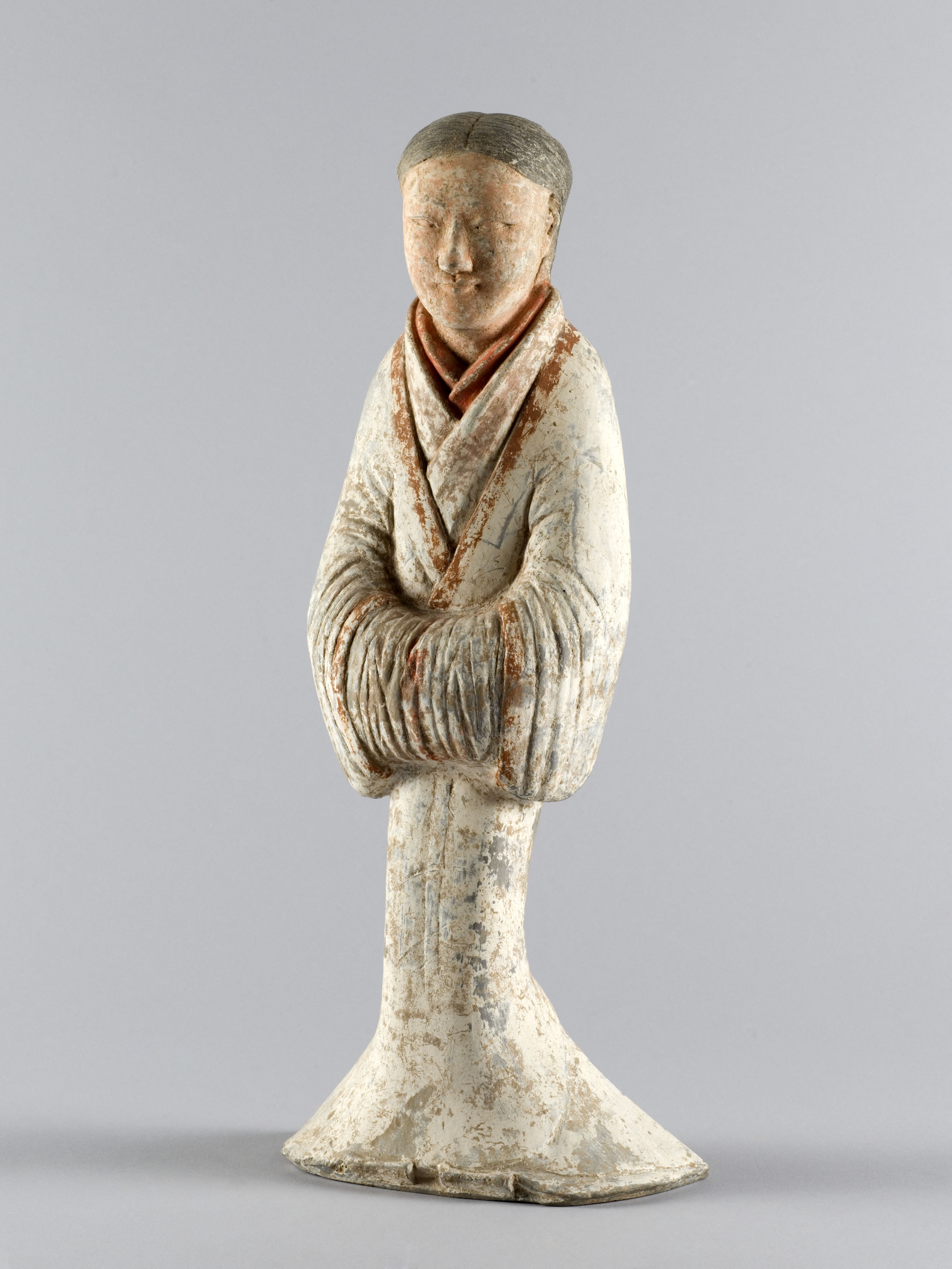
Figurine of a Lady, Western Han, 206 BCE – 9 CE

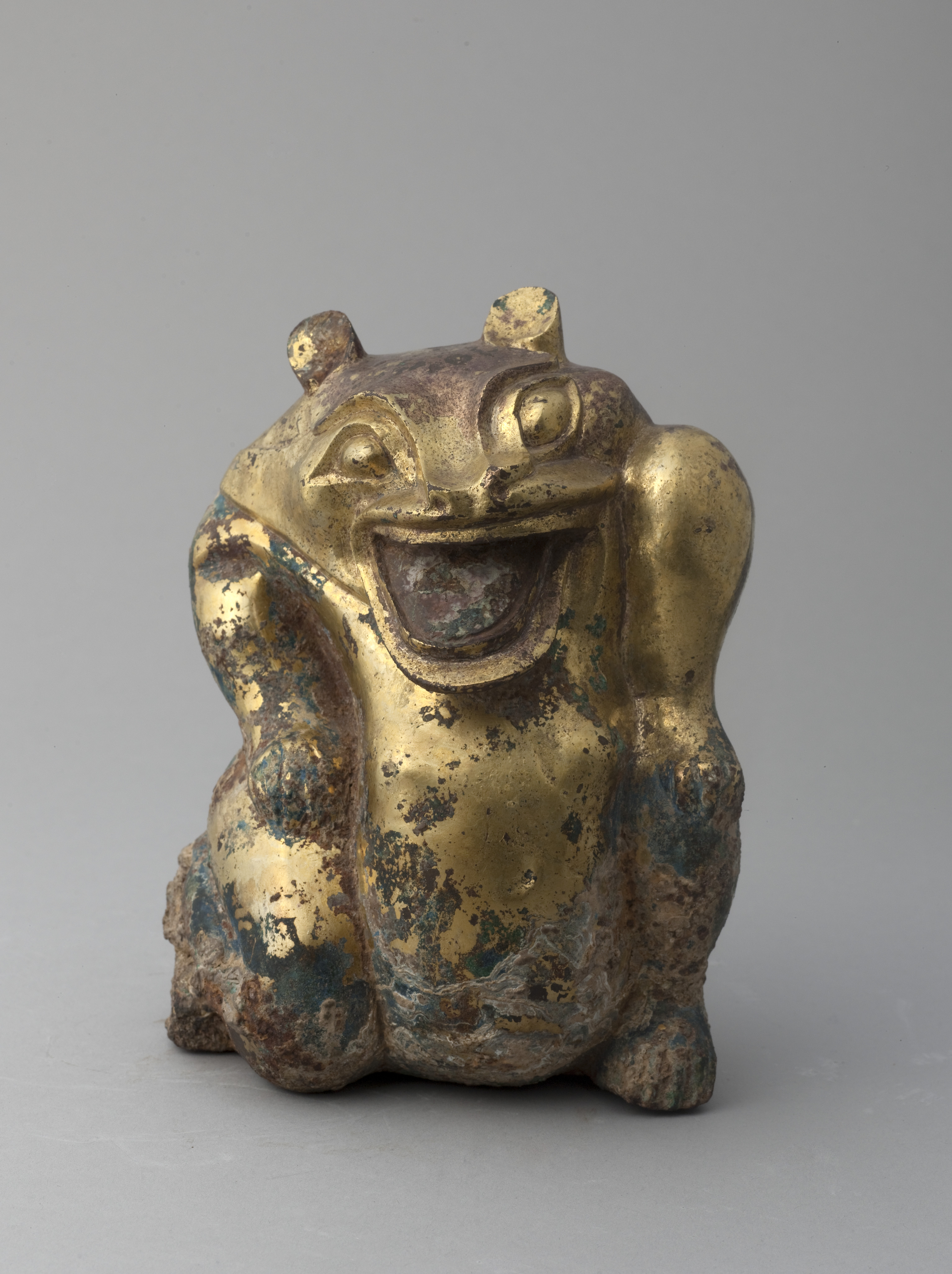
Bear, Han dynasty, 206 BCE – 220 CE

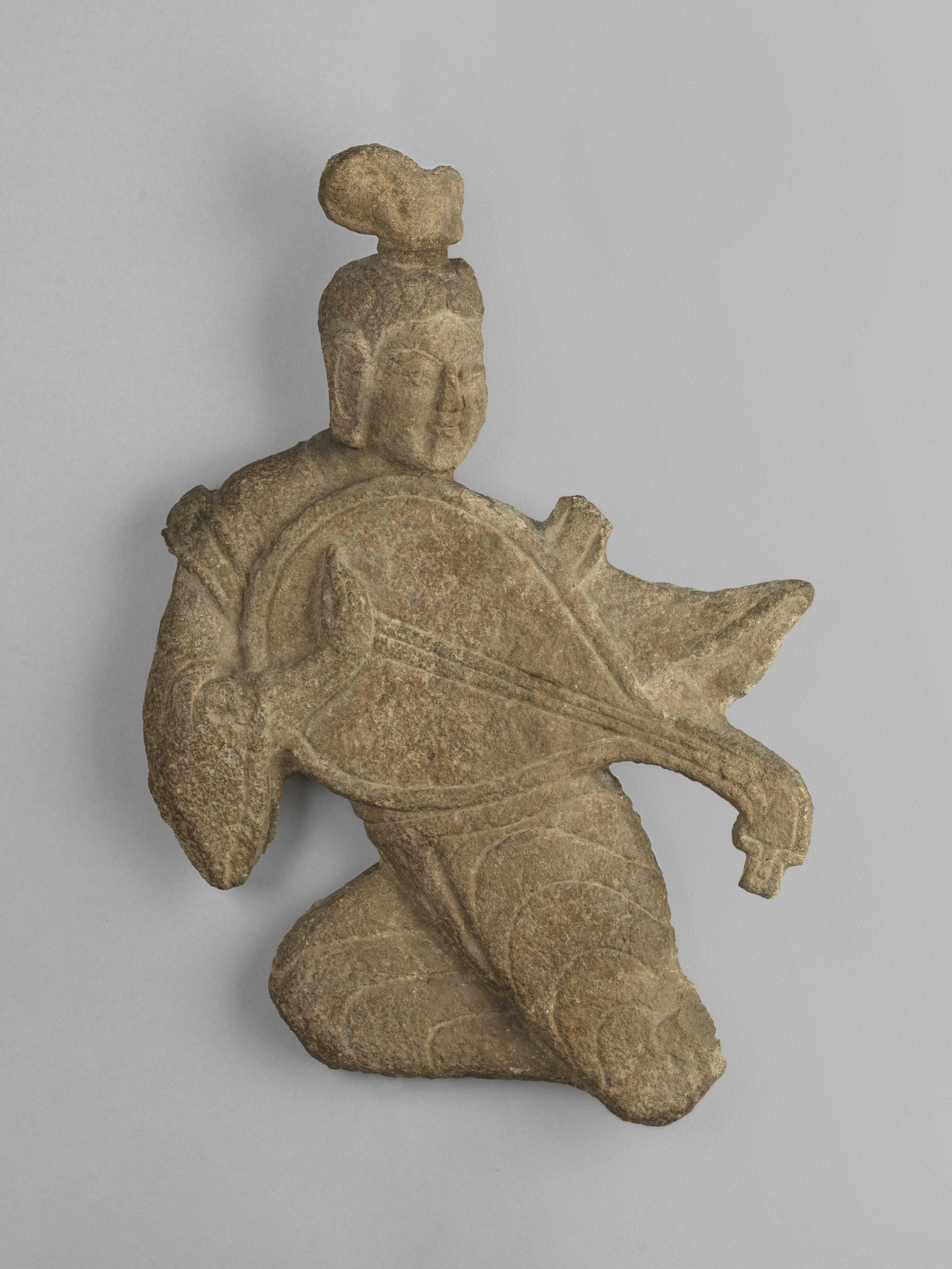
Heavenly Musician, Northern Wei, 386–534

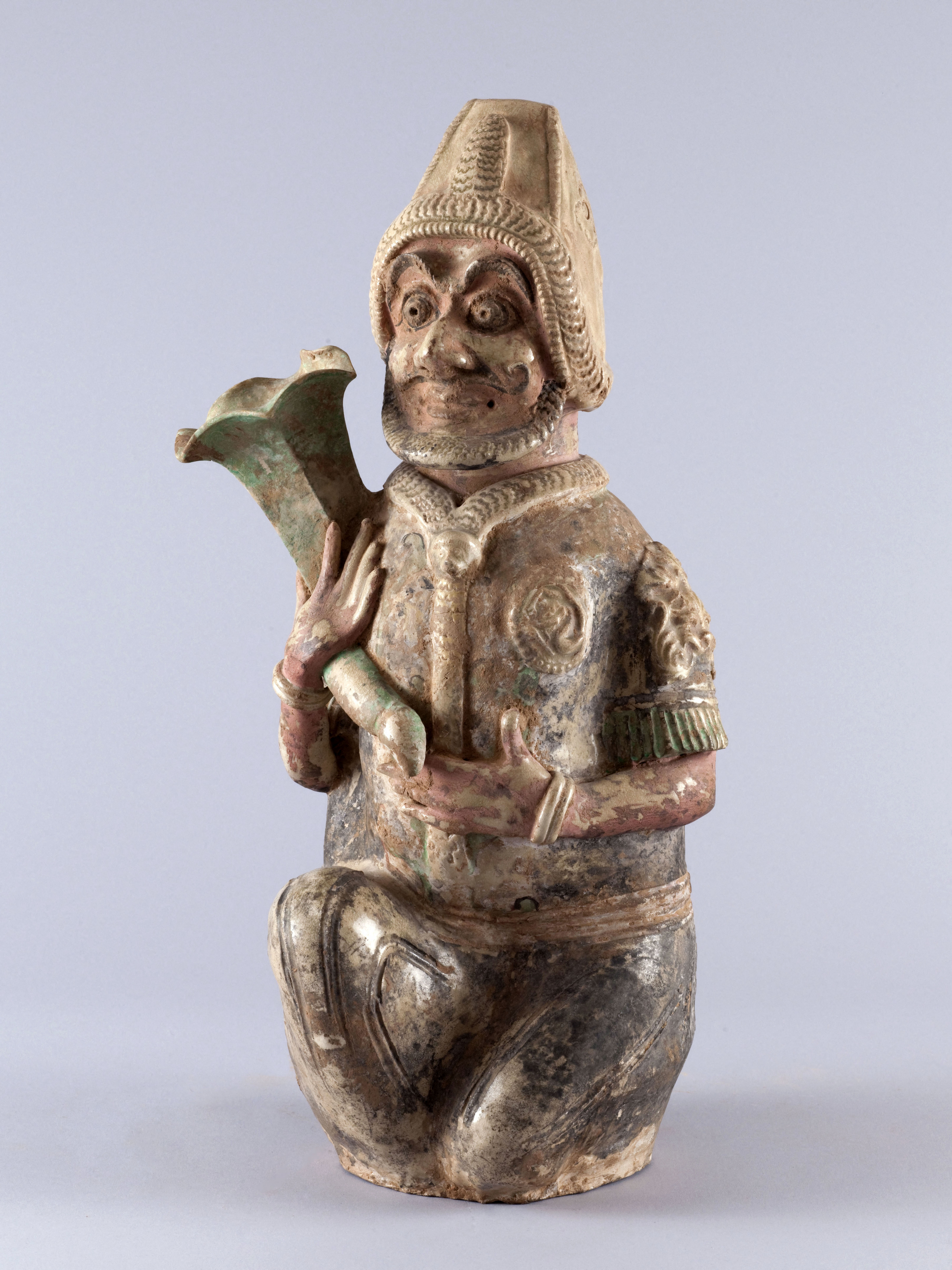
Barbarian with a horn, Tang dynasty, 625–675

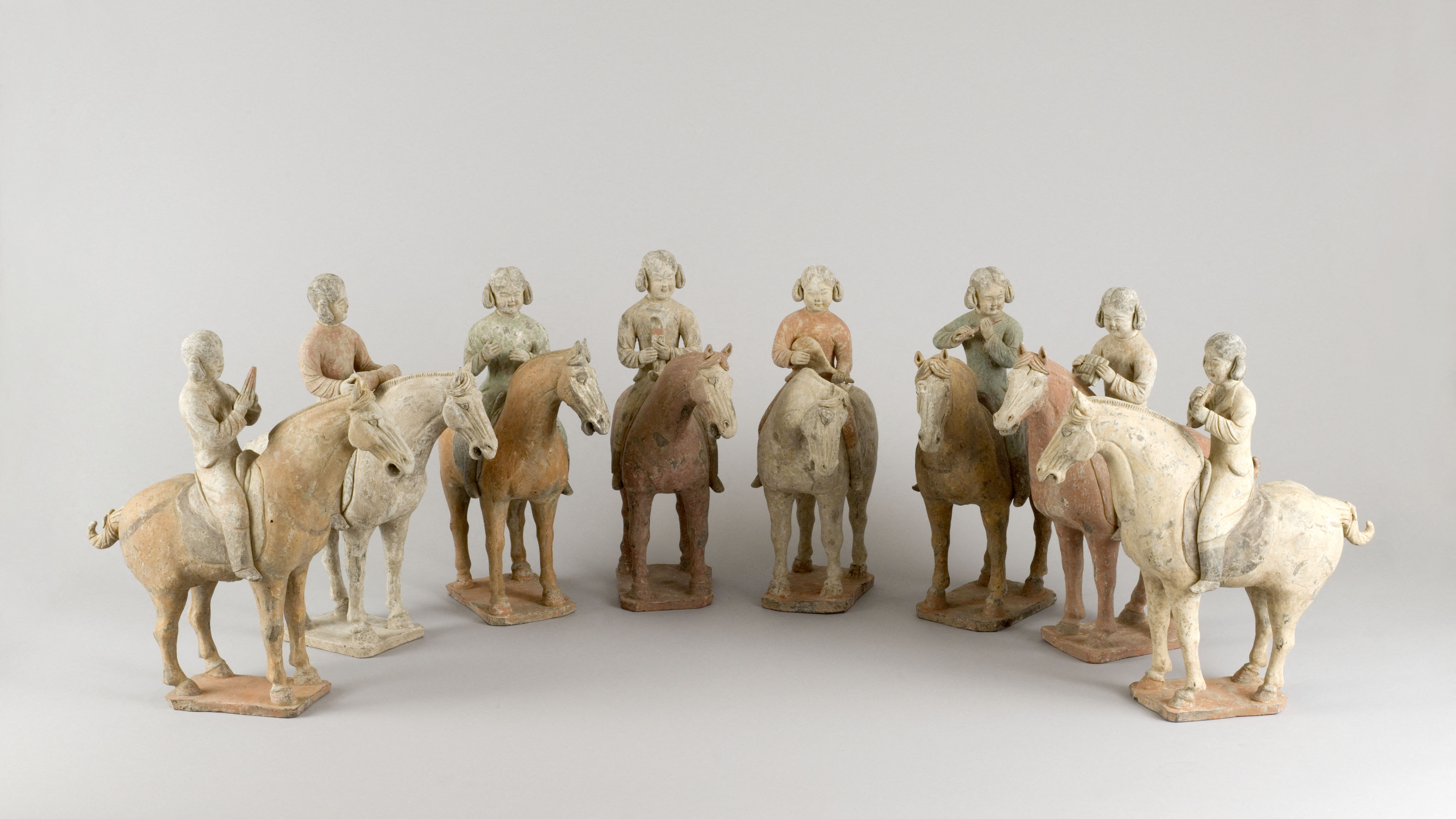
Cavalry musicians, Tang dynasty, 618–907

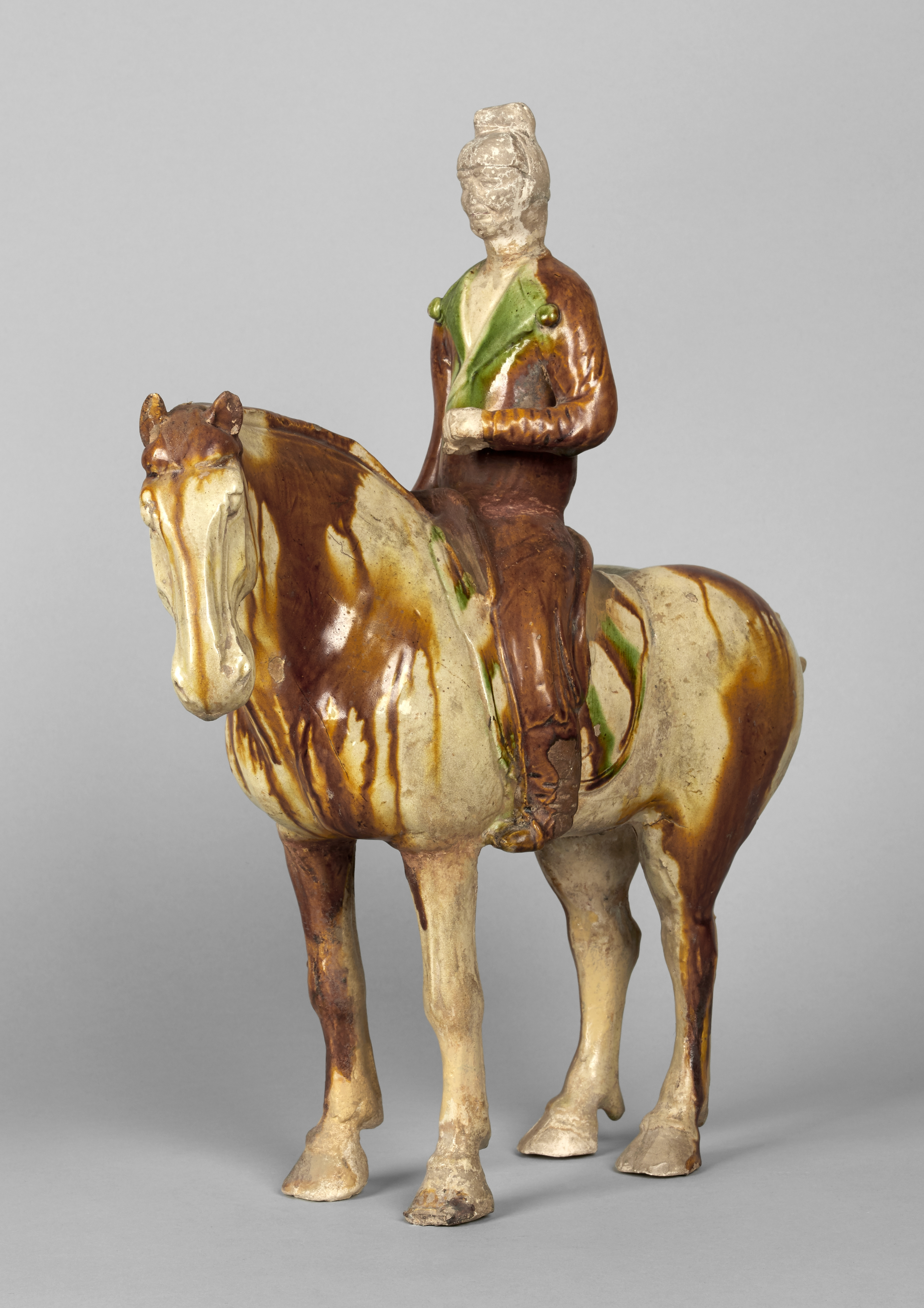
Sancai horse rider, Tang dynasty, 618-907

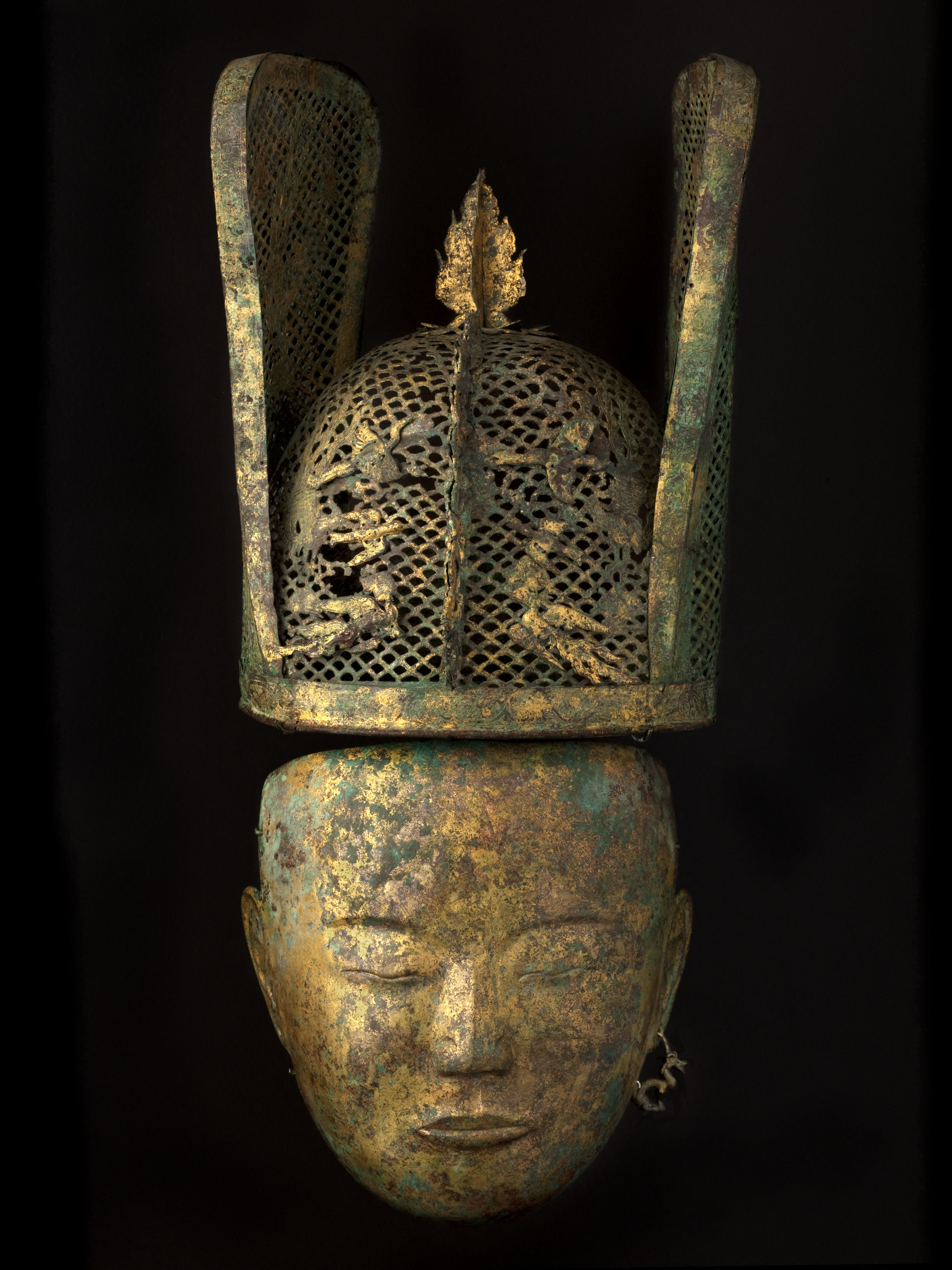
Female funerary mask, Liao dynasty, 907–1125

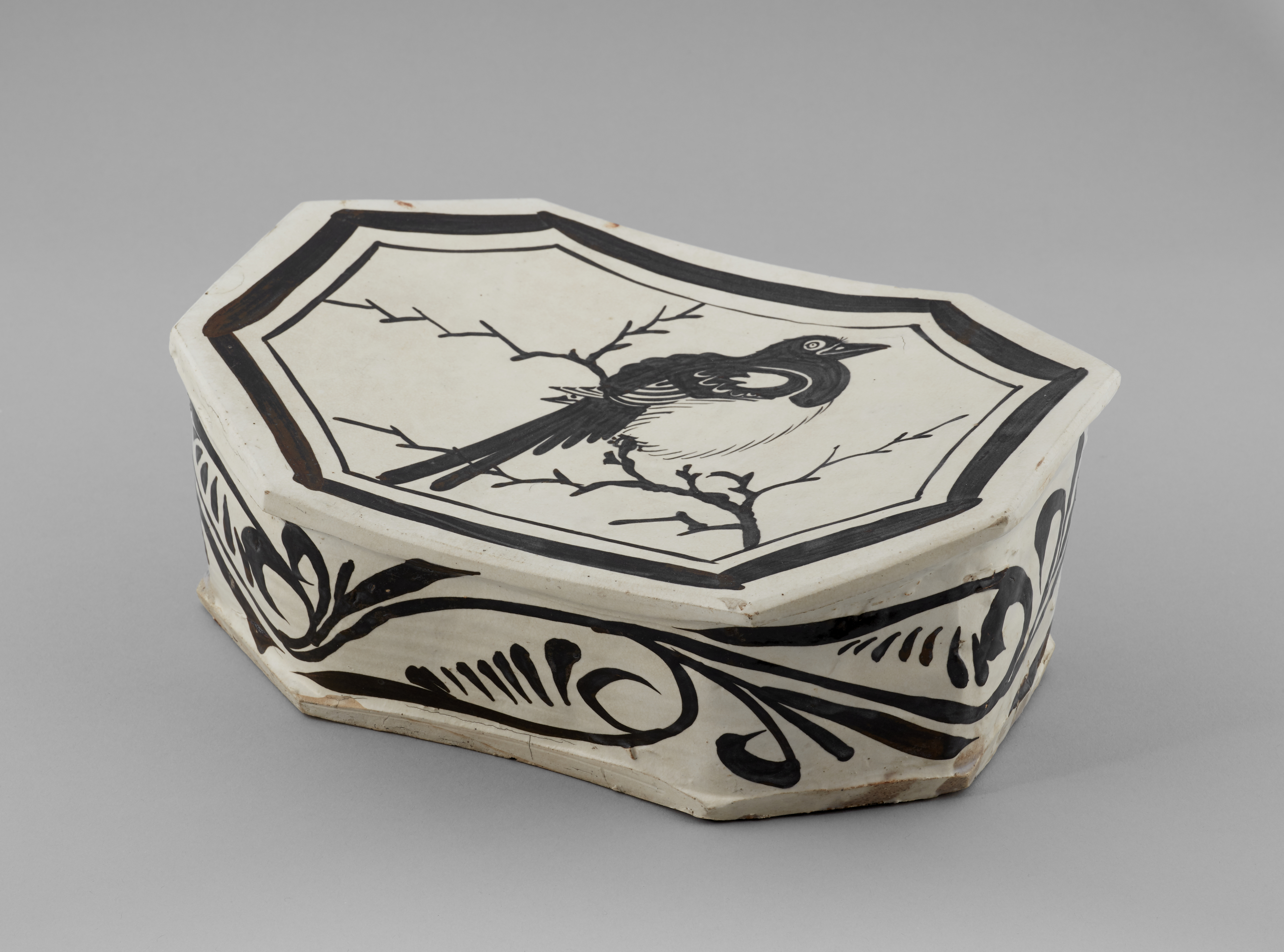
Ceramic pillow, Jin dynasty, 1115–1234

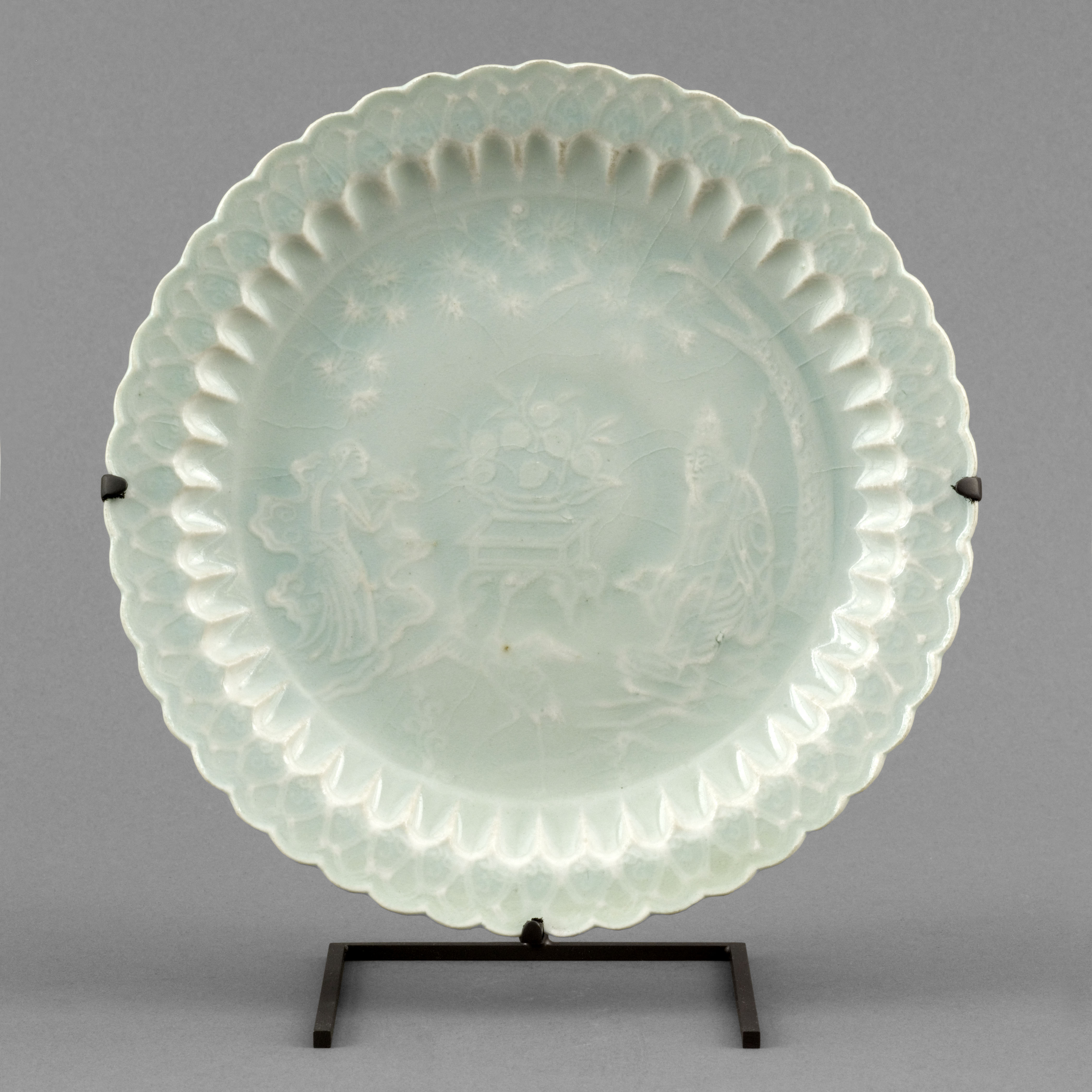
Platter, Qingbai ware, Southern Song dynasty, 1127–1279

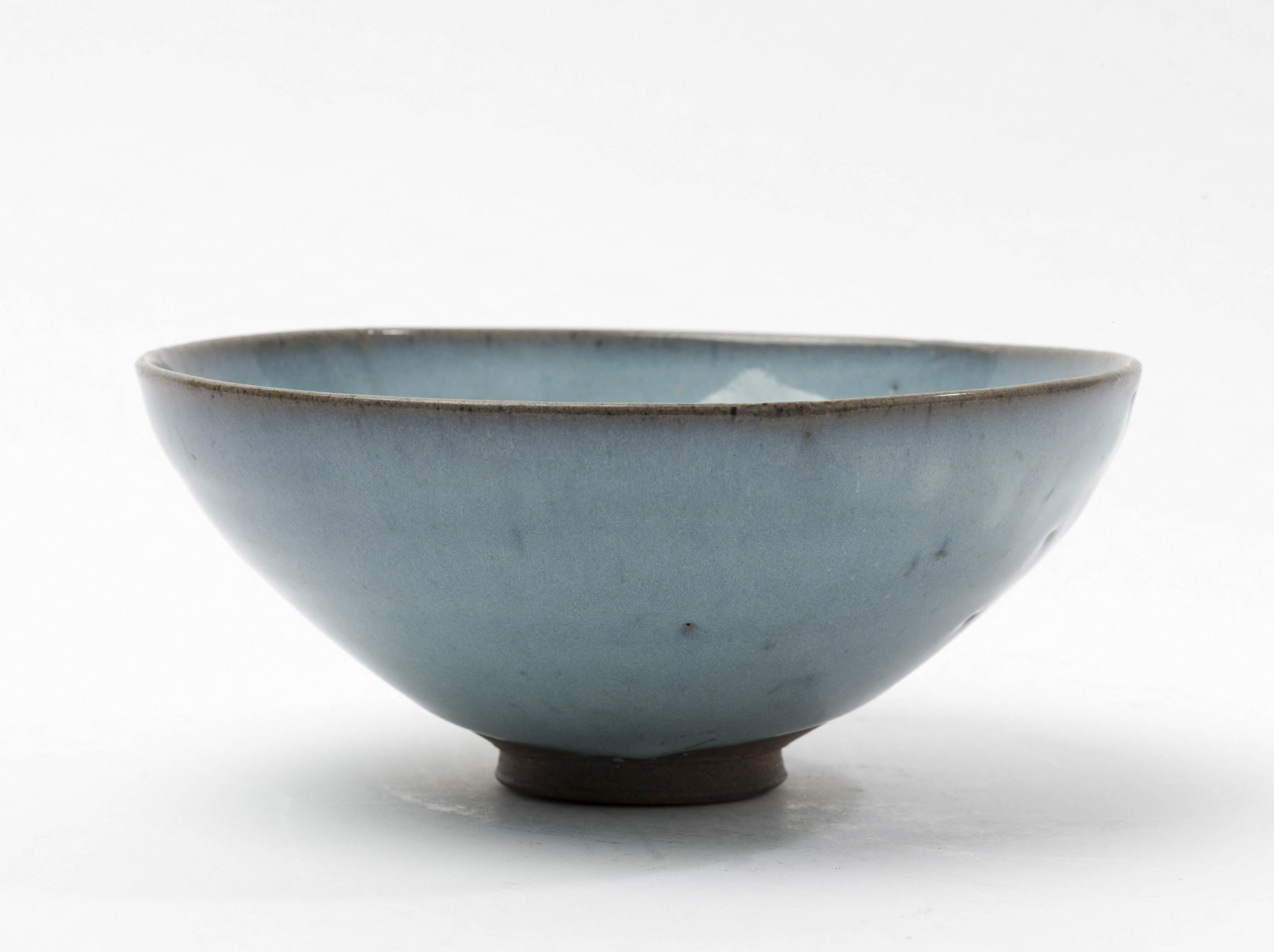
Bowl, Jun ware, 14th century

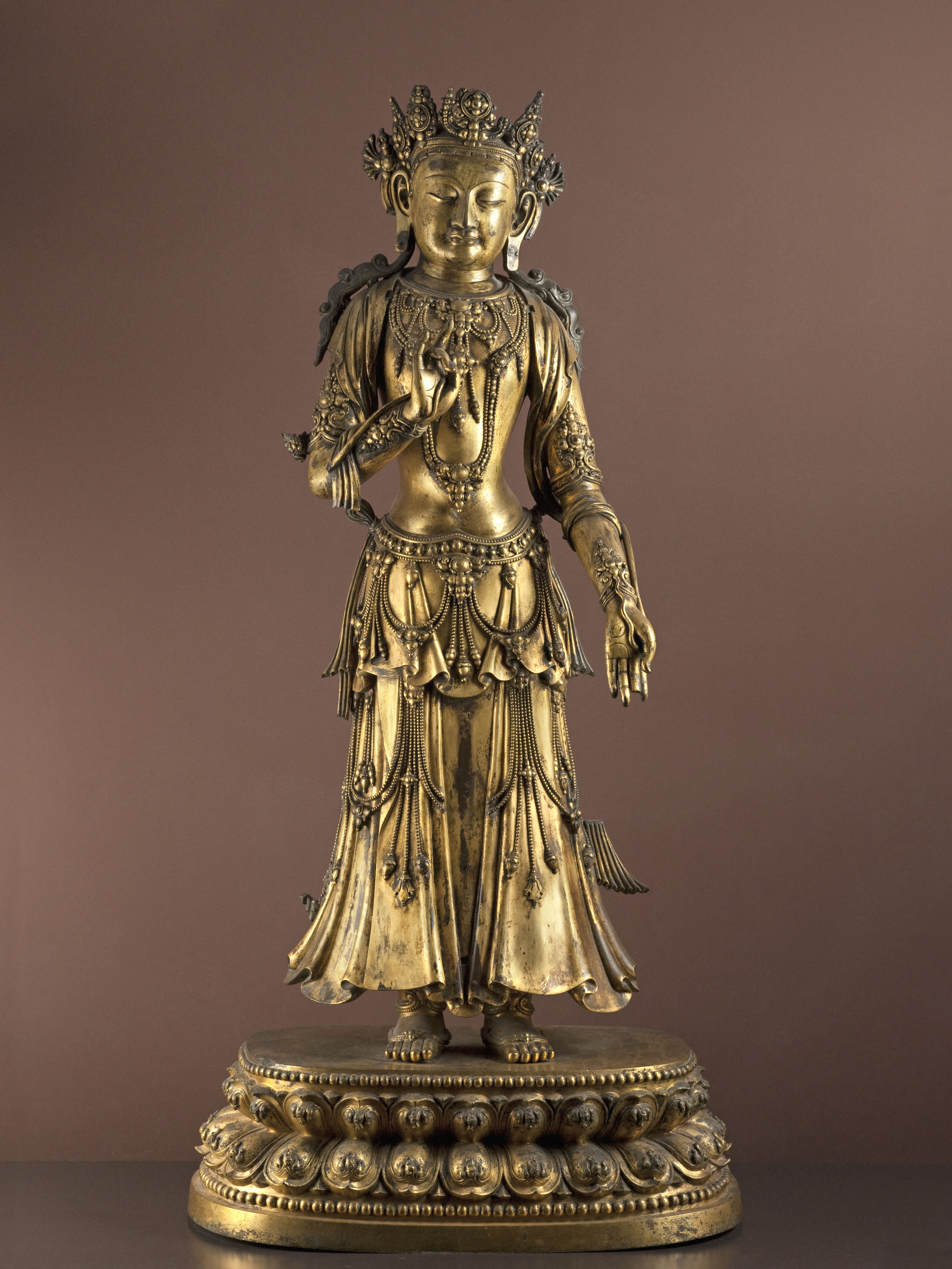
Bronze statue of Bodhisattva, Yongle era, 1403–1424

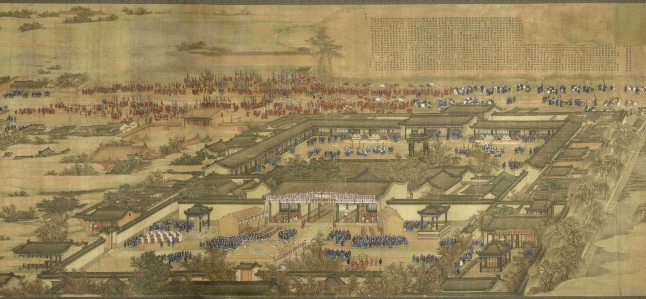
Painting of Hanlin Academy, 1744–1745

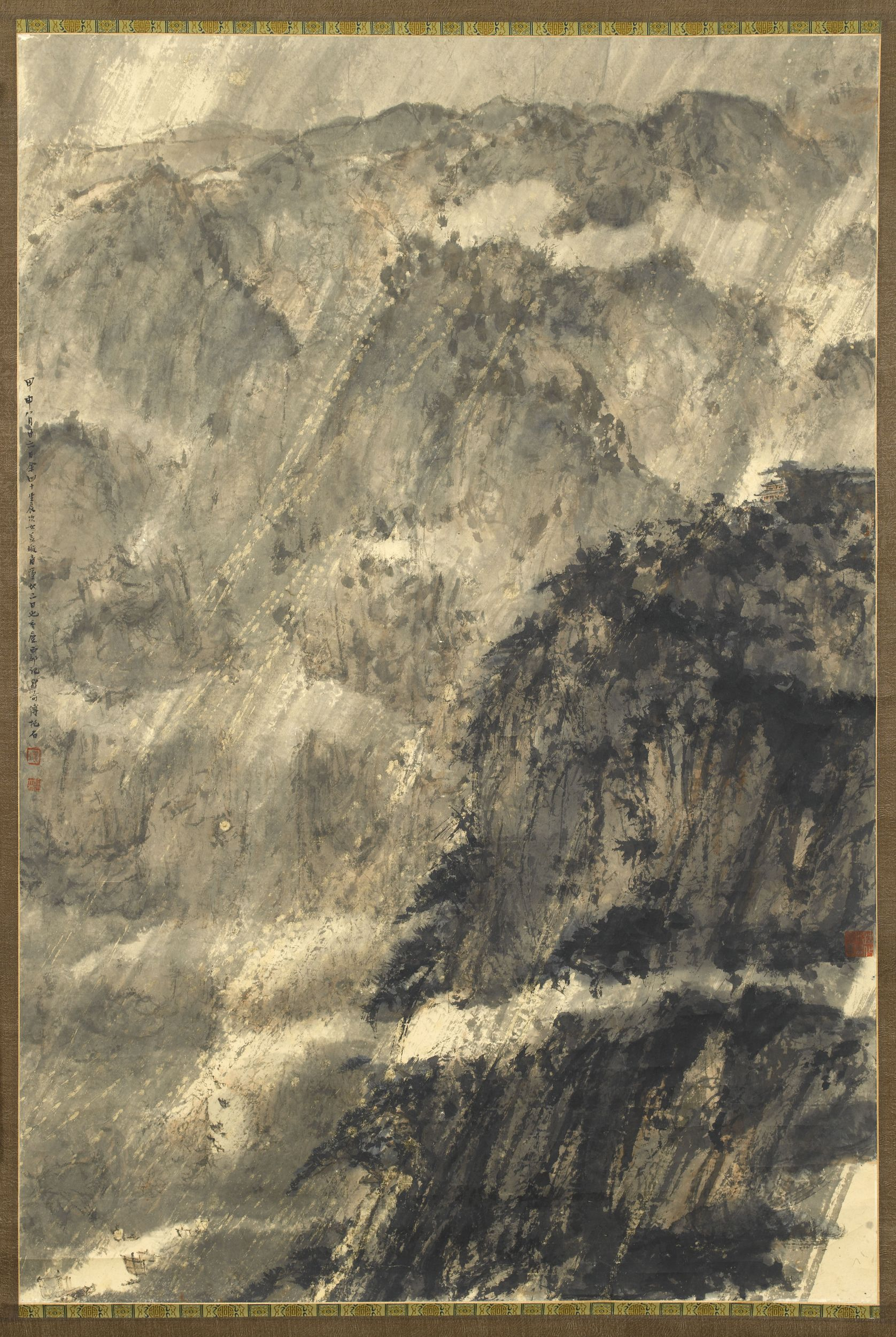
Storm by Fu Baoshi, 1944

=== Japan ===
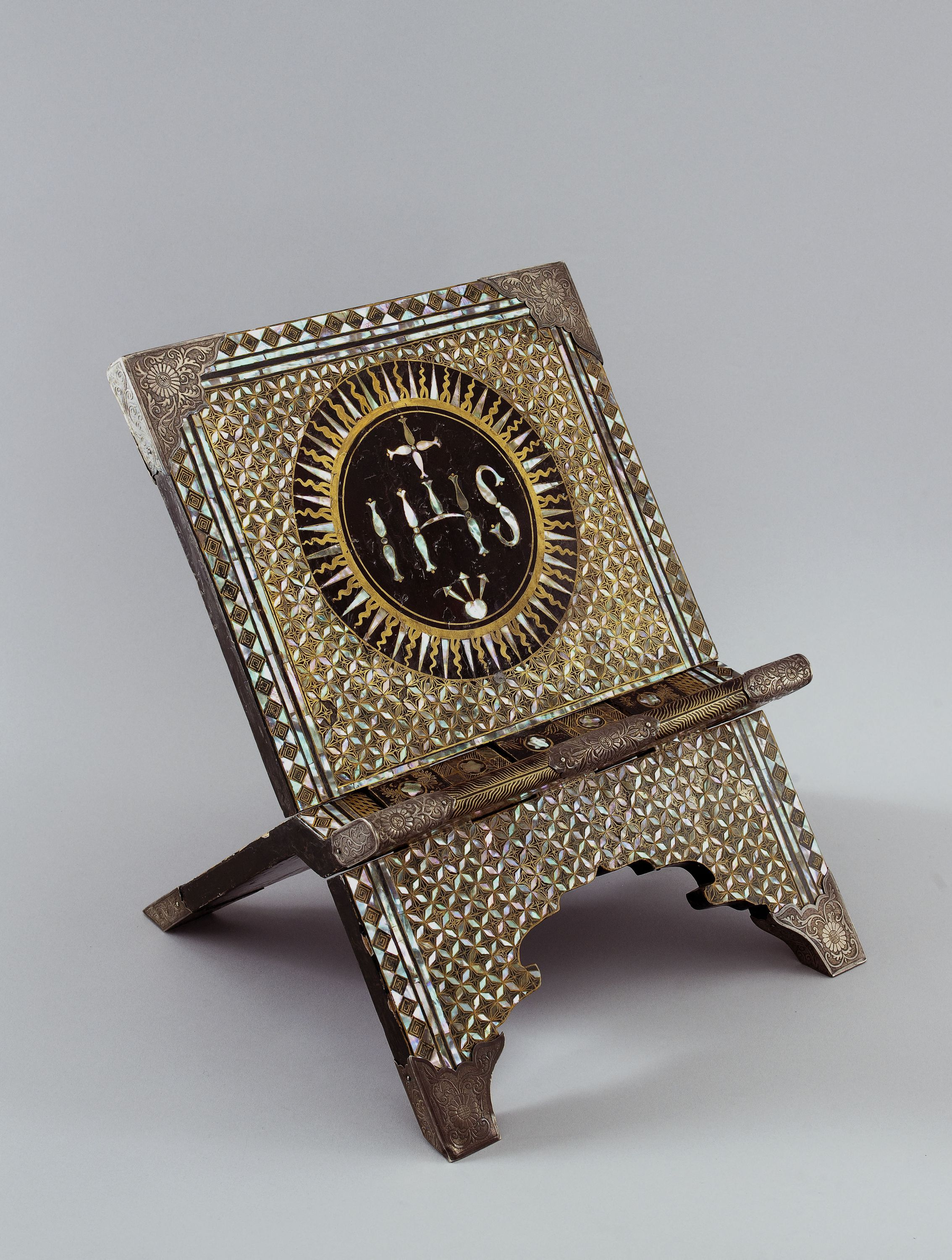
Foldable lectern (shokendai 書見台), 1573–1603

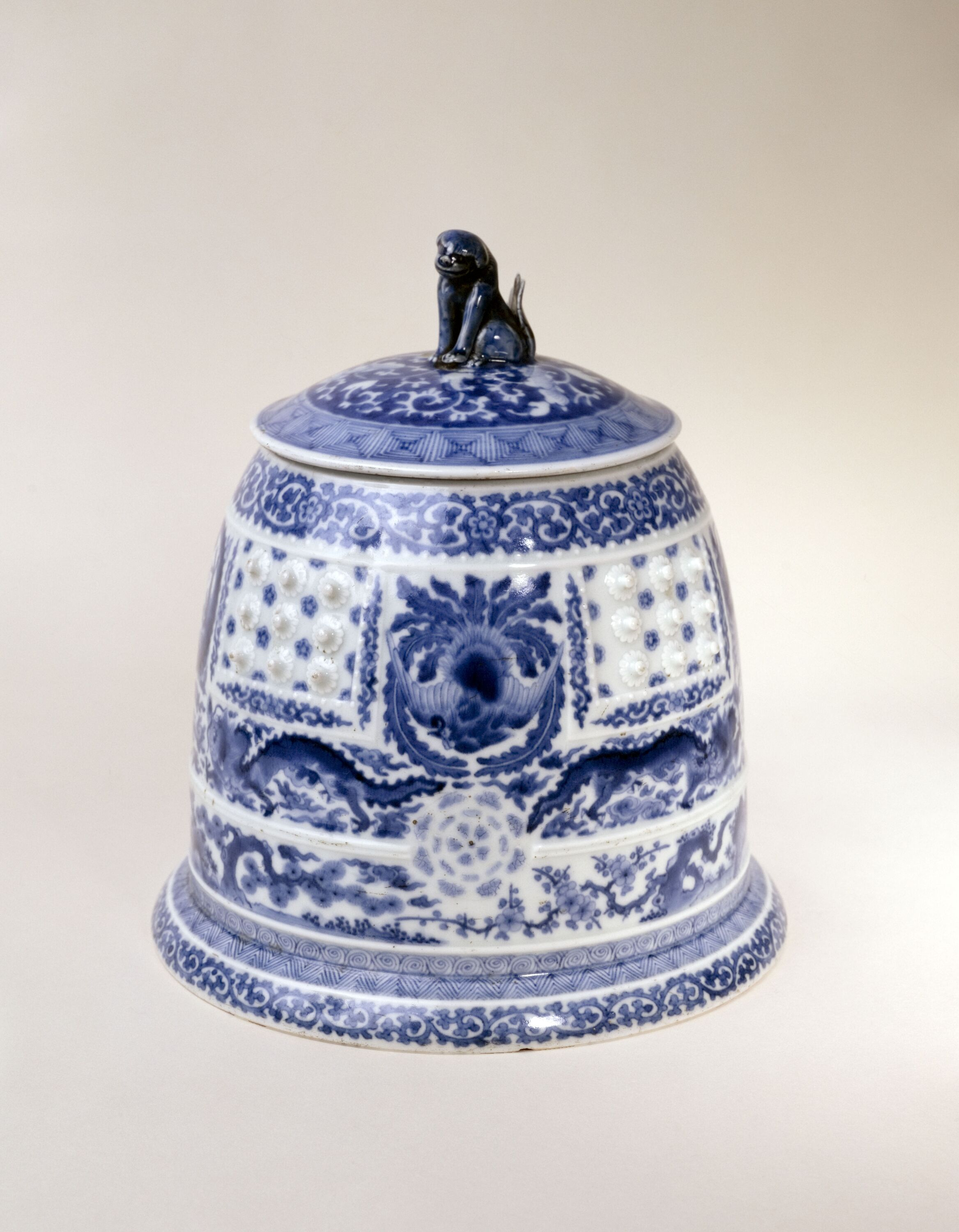
Water pot (mizusashi), 1680–1700

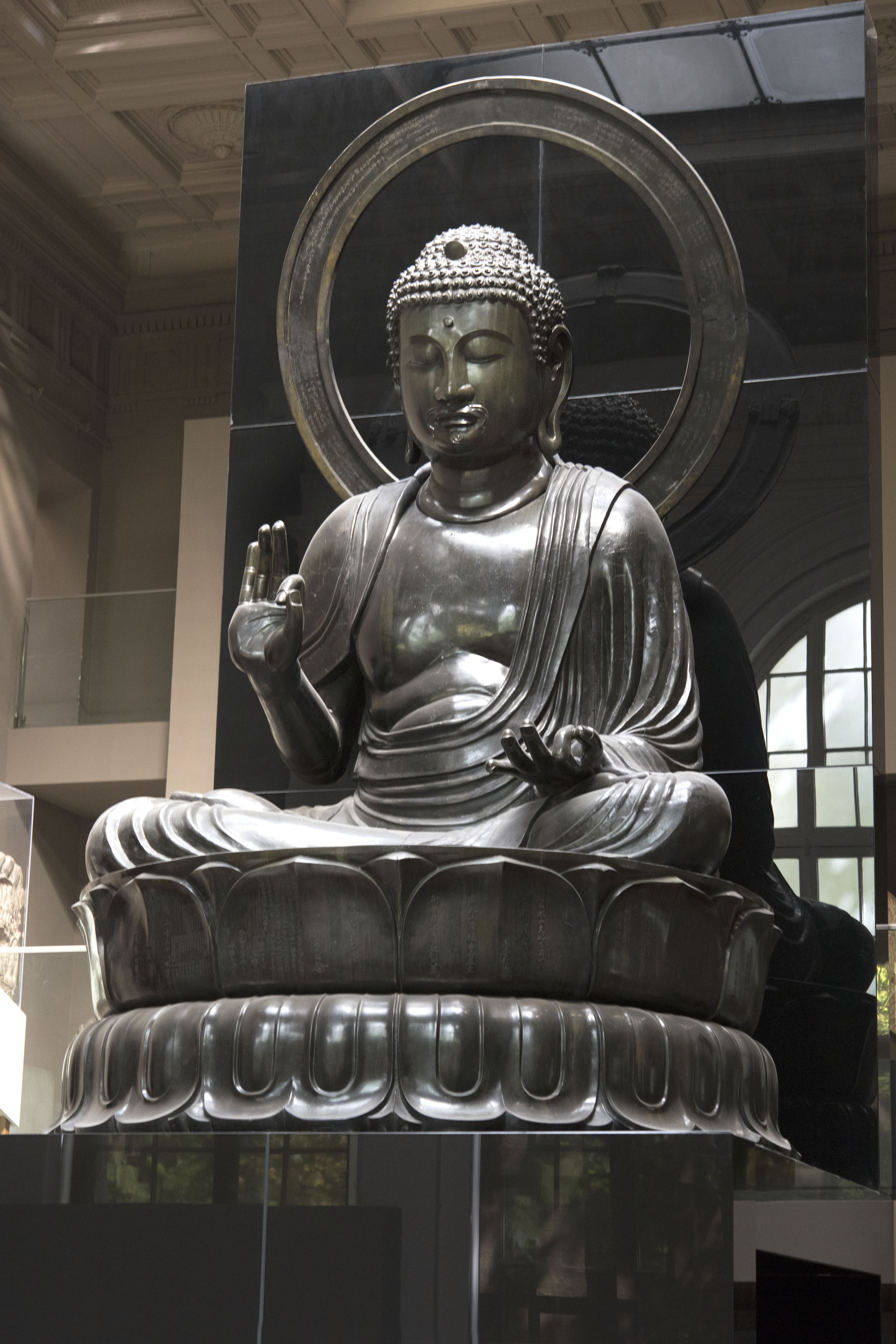
Buddha Amitābha, 18th century

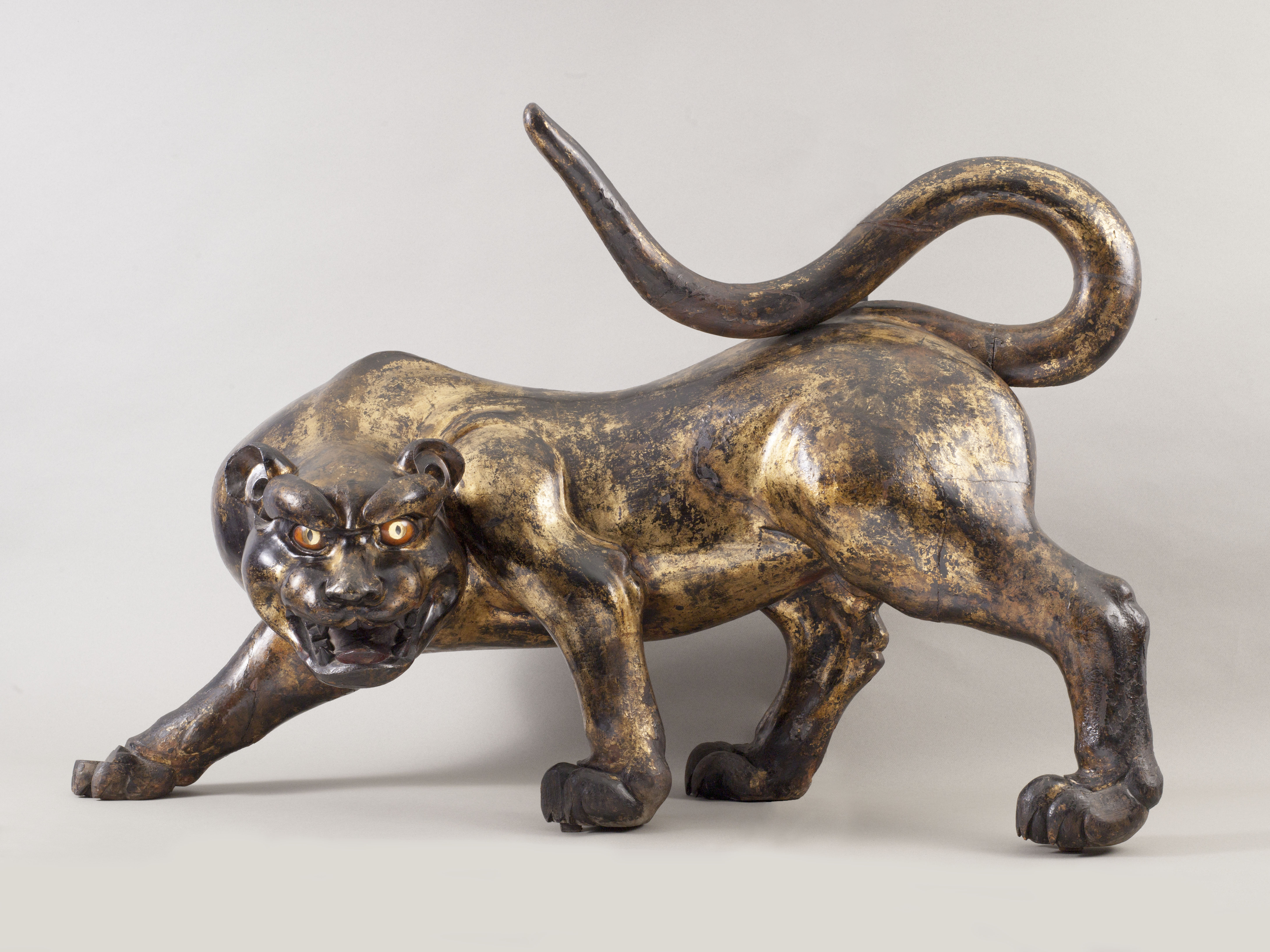
Tiger, wood and lacquer, 18th–19th century

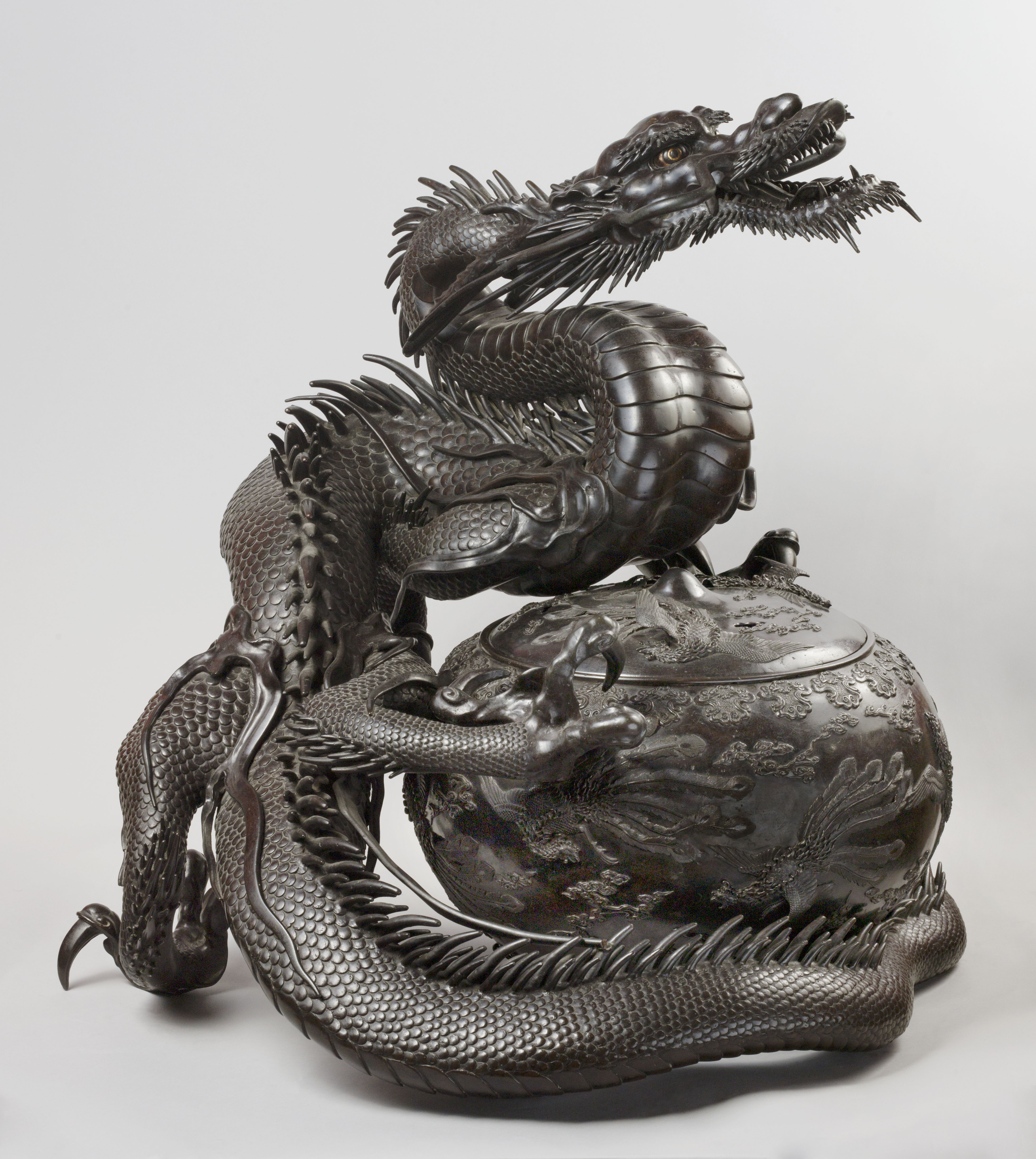
Bronze censer (kōro) with dragon made by Kimura Toun (c. 1800–1870)

=== Vietnam ===
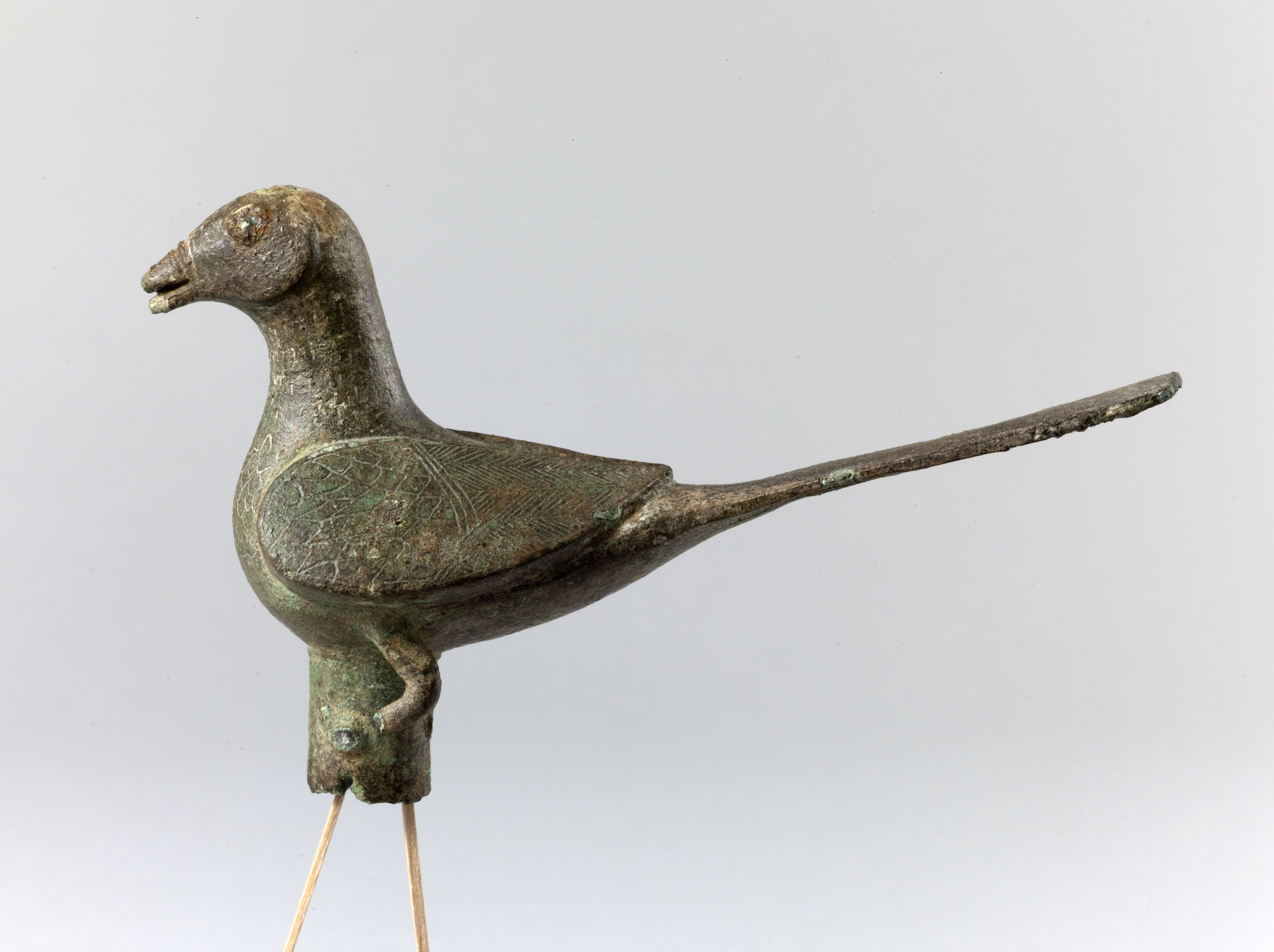
Bird-shaped emblem, Bronze, 50–400

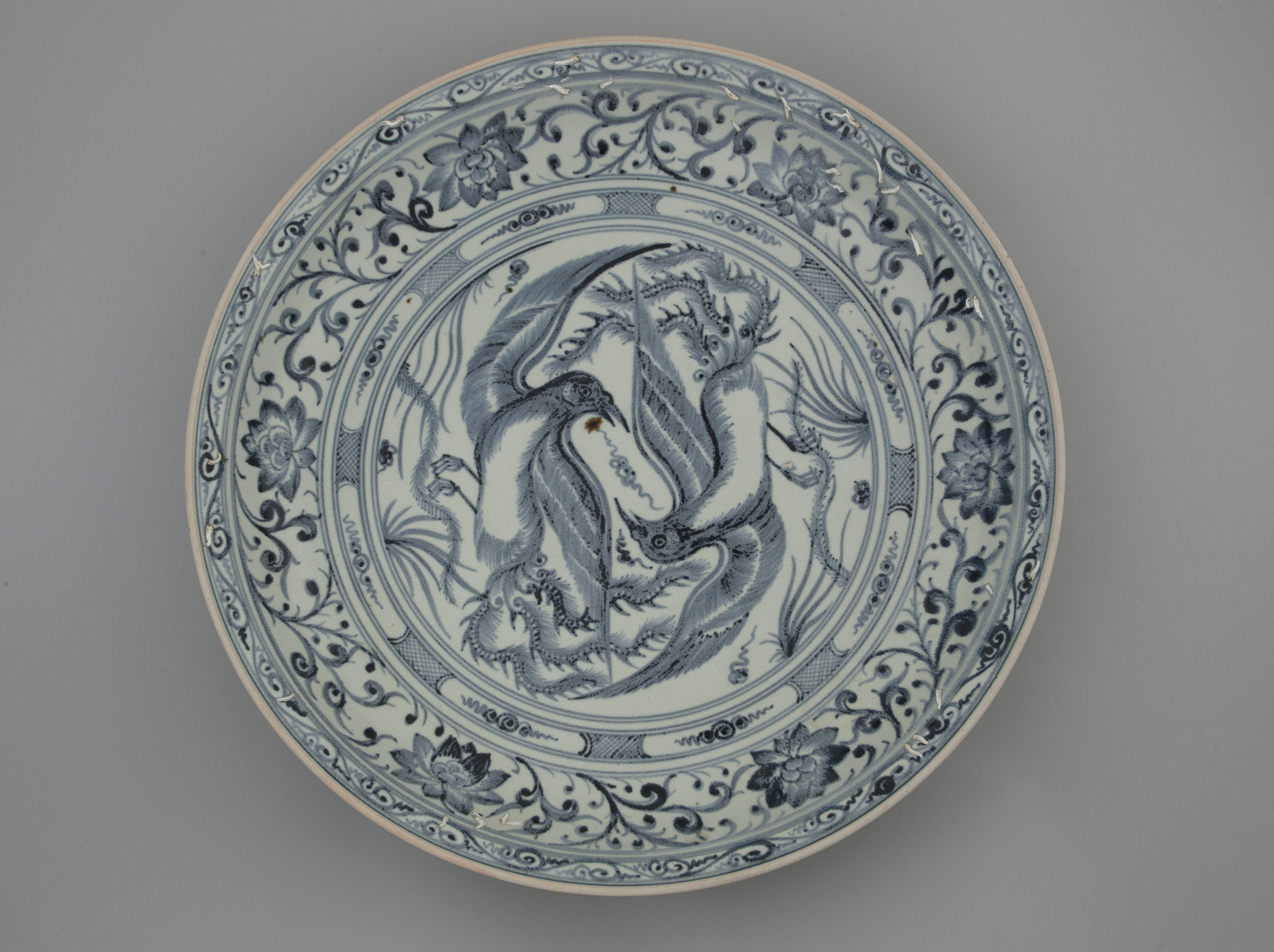
Platter with phoenix, c. 1450

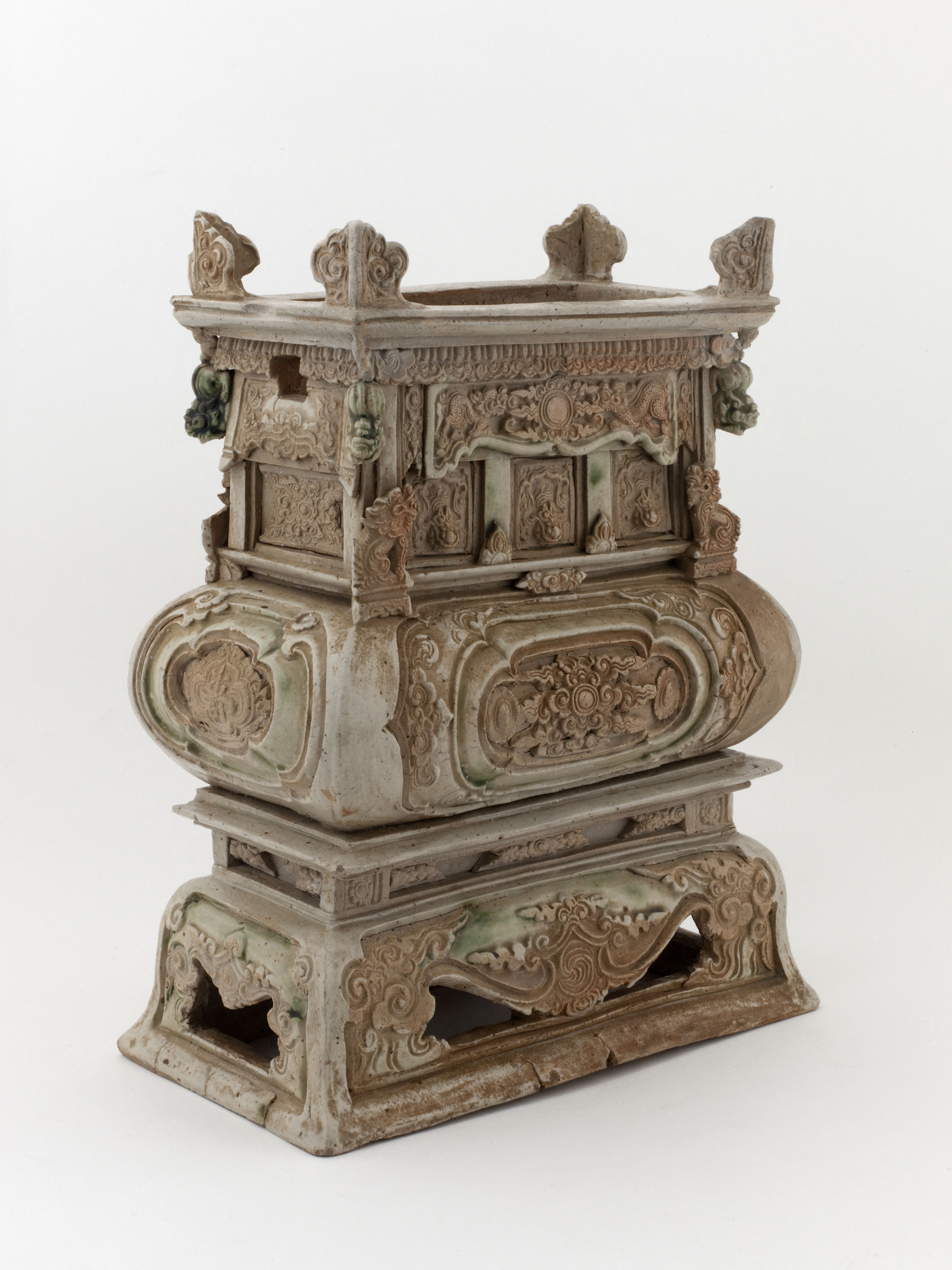
Censer, 17th century

=== Korea ===
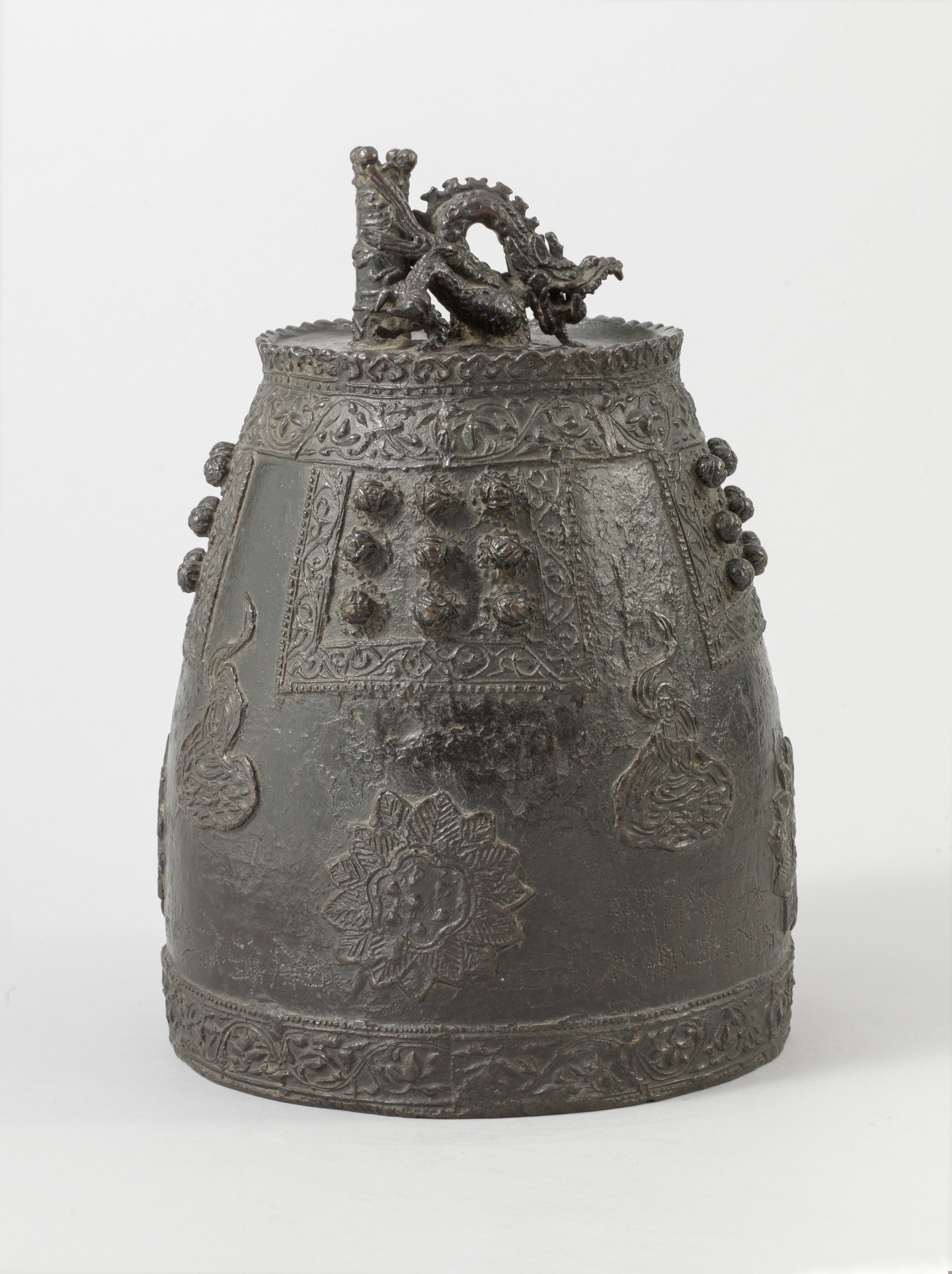
Bell, 1311

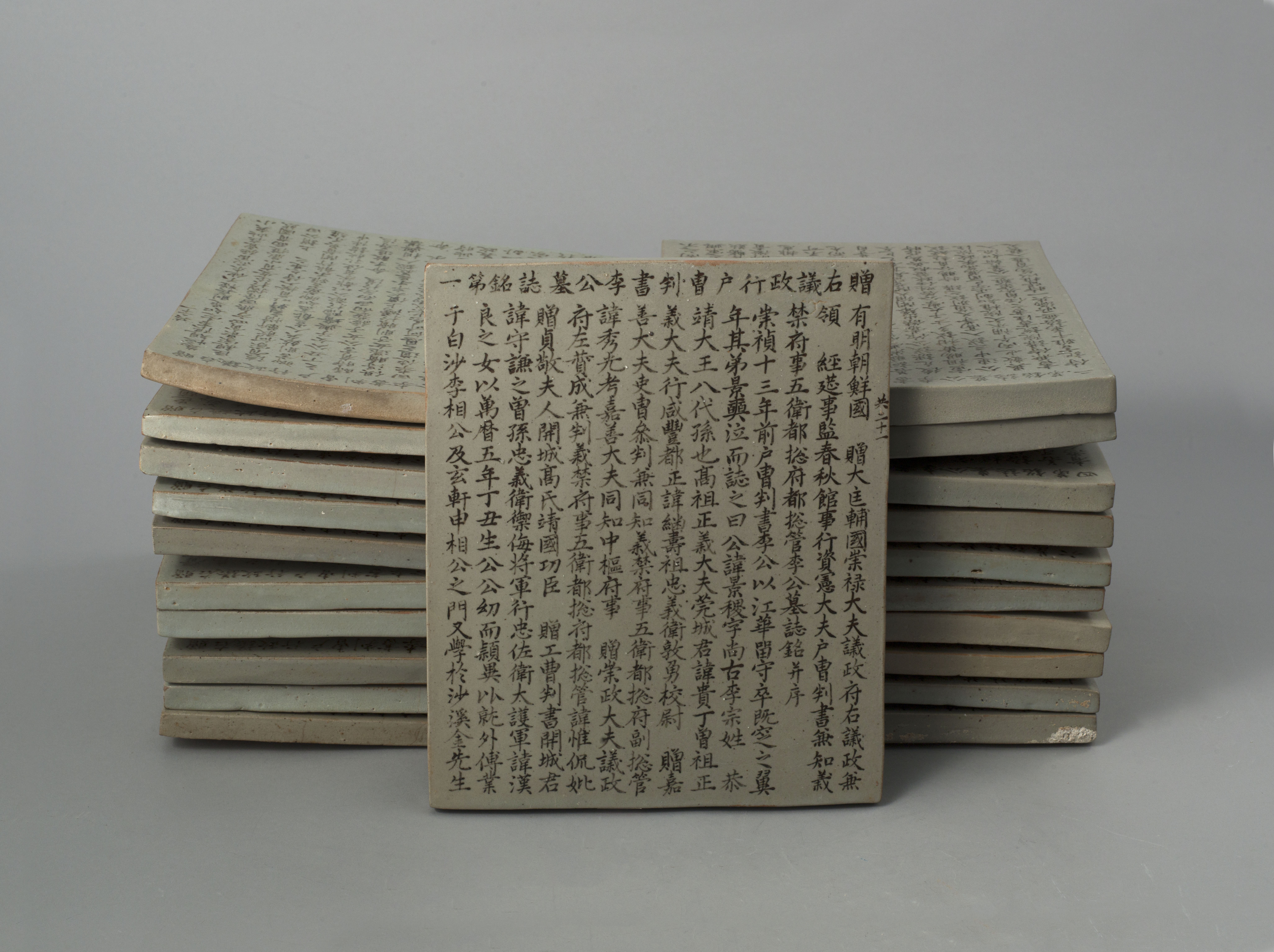
Epitaph of Yi Kyŏngjik (1577–1640), Calligraphy on porcelain tablets, c. 1640
