= Courcelles station =

Metro station in Paris, France

Courcelles
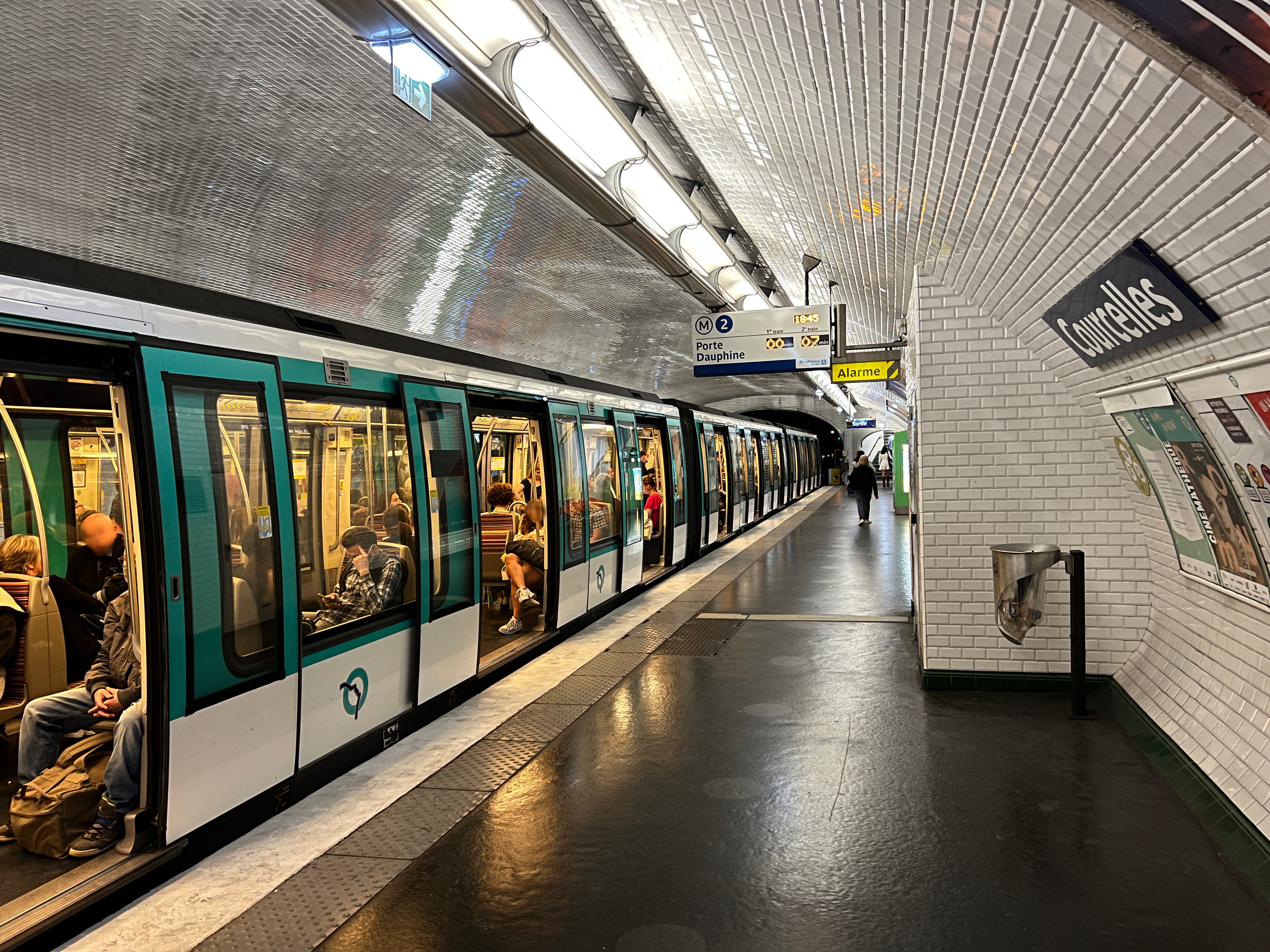

General information
- Location: 1, rue de Chazelle; 53, boul. de Courcelles; 8th arrondissement of Paris; Île-de-France; France
- Coordinates: 48°52′45″N 2°18′15″E
- Owner: RATP
- Operator: RATP

Other information
- Fare zone: 1

History
- Opened: 7 October 1902

Services
| Preceding station | Paris Metro | Following station |
|---|---|---|
| Ternes towards Porte Dauphine | Line 2 | Monceau towards Nation |
Location
- Location within Paris

Courcelles (French pronunciation: [kuʁsɛl]) is a station on Paris Métro Line 2, under the Boulevard de Courcelles on the border of the 8th and 17th arrondissement of Paris.

== Location ==
The station is located under Boulevard de Courcelles, east of the intersection with the eponymous street. Approximately oriented along an east–west axis, it intersects between Ternes and Monceau stations.

== History ==
The station was opened on 7 October 1902 as part of the extension of Line 2 Nord from Étoile to Anvers which became line 2 on 17 October 1907. The Boulevard was named after the Barrière de Courcelles, a gate built for the collection of taxation as part of the Wall of the Farmers-General; the gate was built between 1784 and 1788 and demolished in 1859. The gate was named after a small village in the area that was absorbed into Paris in 1860.

From the 1950s until 2007, the walls were covered with metal bodywork with blue horizontal uprights and illuminated golden advertising frames. This arrangement was then supplemented with shell white seats characteristic of the Motte style.

As part of the RATP's Renouveau du métro program, the station's corridors were renovated on 22 November 2002 and then the platforms in 2008 which led to the removal of their metal bodywork.

In 2019, 2,557,929 travelers entered this station which placed it at 205th position of the metro stations for its usage of 303 metro stations.

== Passenger services ==
=== Access ===
The station has two entrances opening on either side of Boulevard de Courcelles, each consisting of a fixed staircase embellished with a mast with a yellow M inscribed in a circle:

- entrance 1 - Boulevard de Courcelles - Parc Monceau leading to the right of boulevard at no. 53;
- entrance 2 - Rue de Chazelles located opposite no. 1 of this street, at the corner with the boulevard.

=== Station layout ===
G Street Level
| M | Mezzanine for platform connection |
| P Platform level | Side platform, doors will open on the right |
| P Platform level | Platform 1 | ← toward Porte Dauphine (Ternes) |
| P Platform level | Platform 2 | toward Nation (Monceau) → |
| P Platform level | Side platform, doors will open on the right |

=== Platforms ===
Courcelles is a standard configuration station. It has two platforms separated by the metro tracks and the vault is elliptical. The decoration is of the style used for most metro stations. The lighting canopies are white and rounded in the Gaudin style of the renouveau du métro des années 2000 renovation, and the bevelled white ceramic tiles cover the walls, the vault, the tunnel exits and the outlets of the corridors. The advertising frames are in white ceramic and the name of the station is written in the Parisine font on enameled plates. The Akiko style seats are orange.

=== Bus services ===
The station is served by lines 30 and 84 of the RATP Bus Network.

== Nearby ==
- Alexander Nevsky Cathedral, Paris, seat of the archdiocese of Russian Orthodox churches in Western Europe.
- L’église Suédoise de Paris, of the Lutheran faith.

== Trivia ==
Fulgence Bienvenüe, father of the Métro, lived near this station.
