= Marcel Triboulet =

French footballer (1890-1939)

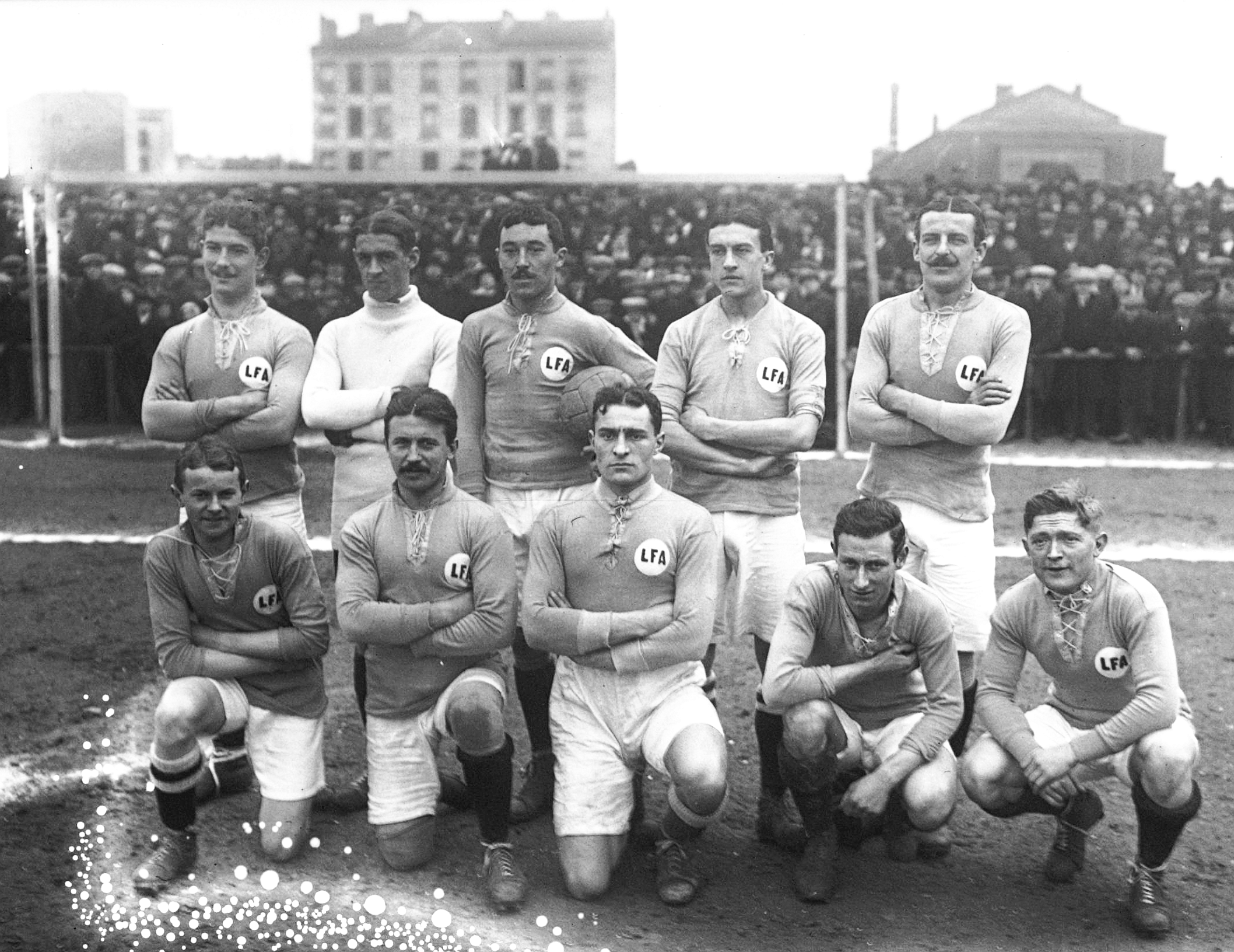
- Triboulet (crouching on the right) and the LFA selection in 1914

Personal information
- Date of birth: 26 January 1890
- Place of birth: Thieffrans, France
- Date of death: 30 April 1939 (aged 49)
- Place of death: Creil, France
- Position: Forward

Senior career*
Years	Team	Apps	(Gls)
1910–1912	FEC Levallois		
1911–1913	Angers UC		
1913–1914	FEC Levallois		
1916–1925	RC de France		

International career
1911–1919	France	6	(2)
1913–1914	Paris (LFA)	4	(0)
- * Club domestic league appearances and goals

Marcel Triboulet (26 January 1890 – 30 April 1939) was a French footballer who played as a forward for RC de France and the French national team. He was also named in France's squad for the football tournament at the 1912 Summer Olympics, but the French side withdrew from the competition.

== Early life ==
Marcel Triboulet was born in Thieffrans on 26 January 1890, as the son of a blacksmith, who gave him the first name of Julius Caesar, which is obviously difficult to wear without attracting mockery, especially because he was only 1.59 meters tall, so he adopted Marcel for his first name.

He moved to the Paris region at a very young age and was raised in Levallois where he learned to play on the Macadam with a tin can as a ball, in the company of Lucien Letailleur and Pierre Chayriguès, whom he had met while attended the independent school in Levallois-Perret. He played many football games with them, on the town's church square against the young people from the public school, even when they were outnumbered. In 1910, all three of them signed with Gaston Barreau's FC Levallois.

== Football career ==
Due to his size, Triboulet was a fast and dribbling left winger, well anchored to the ground and difficult to deprive of the ball, so he quickly made a name for himself. Training with a tin can, which does not bounce, teaches one to juggle and play on the volley, so he became great at that, with L'Auto once writing that "Our most brilliant attacker is Triboulet, who juggles the ball like a monkey".

In late 1911, he briefly played for Angers Université Club, before actually joining them for the 1912–13 season. Back at FEC Levallois, he won the LFA Championship with his teammates, scoring more than half of his team's goals. During the 1914 Trophée de France, Levallois lost the semifinals 1–4 to Olympique Lillois. Shortly after, in early May 1914, he was announced as a RC de France player, but before he could make his debut, the First World War broke out in July, and he was injured in October, receiving three injuries, including a bayonet wound in the right foot (Triboulet being left-handed), and two wounds due to shrapnel: To the arm and chest, the latter being described as "two fingers below the heart" and into the lung. These injuries led to his discharge in 1915, which allowed him to play football again at Racing. In 1922, he had to leave Paris for professional reasons, but later returned and played with Racing until 1925, aged 35, where his role was to supervise the young players.

== International career ==
He made his international debut on 23 April 1911, in a friendly match against Switzerland in Geneva, which ended in a 5–2 loss, with Triboulet being at the origin of the first French goal scored by captain Louis Mesnier. In October 1911, Triboulet wanted to go to Rennes, but had to go to Cholet to carry out his military service for two years in the 77th Infantry Regiment, where he practiced with the patronage of the Jeune France de Cholet. Triboulet was selected because he was licensed to the Parisian club FC Levallois, becoming the first international player in the club's history, and received all of his selections as a player for Levallois, despite simultaneously playing with the Angers Université Club.

He earned his second international cap for France on 28 January 1912, with Triboulet creating the opening goal scored by Eugène Maës in a 1–1 draw with Belgium. In the following month, on 18 February, he was called up for his third match against Switzerland, but he was under military service, so Charles Simon, president of the CFI, requested permission for the player from the general commanding the 77th Army Corps on which Triboulet depended, but the general refused since the military only recognized the USFSA, not the CFI. Nevertheless, Triboulet obtained a 36-hour permit because it was Mardi Gras ("Fat Tuesday"), but was forbidden from playing in the match, which he attended only as a spectator, but the public recognized him and asked him to play because no player was scheduled to replace him, and he enventually yielded to the public's requests and ended up scoring a goal to help his side to a 4–1 win, forming a great partnership with Henri Viallemonteil on the left, and both were described by the press as the best players on the pitch, who "got on like thieves in a fair". However, an anonymous indinvidual cut out the match report from L'Auto and sent it to the aforementioned general, thus denouncing Private Triboulet; upon his return, he was notified to the barracks for a punished of eight days in the police station which then turned into eight days in prison, and he was then deprived of leave for two months. This sanction was unique because he was neither the first nor the last to play a match (international or otherwise) while under military service (during a leave), and the Army never had any problems with it. For instance, in 1904, Fernand Canelle and Louis Mesnier preferred to use pseudonyms because they had crossed the border while on leave, but they played other matches under their name, without being worried.

The CFI refrained from reselecting Triboulet for the following year, being called up for a match against Belgium in February 1913, now as a player of Angers UC, but he had to give it up following an injury and was finally replaced by Raymond Dubly, who was regarded as an inferior player. In the following year, Dubly did not want to play two away matches due to the difficulty of traveling to Luxembourg and Hungary, so Triboulet took back his spot, scoring once against Luxembourg in a 5–4 loss.

On 1 November 1913, Triboulet played with the Parisian selection of the LFA, losing 0–5 to a London XI. In 1914, he played three more matches for this team, losing 0–3 to the USFSA selection of the North on 4 January 1914, drawing 1–1 with the Brussels selection on 15 March, and then on 27 March, the team lost again to London XI, this time by a score of 1–5.

During the War, now as a Racing player, Triboulet played two unofficial France-Belgium matches, in 1916 (1–4) and 1918 (2–5), and then played the first official France-Belgium match after the war on 9 March 1919, with Triboulet assisting the French equalizer by captain Gabriel Hanot in a 2–2 draw.

== Later life and death ==
Triboulet became the director of the Weeks factory, located in Saint-Just-en-Chaussée (textiles), and took care of the small club of Saint-Just, organized its merger with the US Creil. It was in Creil that he had a traffic accident when his car collided with a military sidecar and ended up in a ditch. Seriously injured, he was taken to a "health center" in Creil, where he died of his injuries on 30 April 1939, at the age of 49, and tragically, his wife committed suicide a week later by gas.

== Career statistics ==
France score listed first, score column indicates score after each Triboulet goal.

List of international goals scored by Marcel Triboulet
No.	Date	Venue	Opponent	Score	Result	Competition
1	18 February 1912	Stade de Paris, Paris, France	Switzerland	2–0	4–1	Friendly match
2	8 February 1914	Stade Achille Hammerel, Luxembourg City, Luxembourg	Luxembourg	4–5	4–5	Friendly match
