= Rue Saint-Maur station =

Paris Métro station

Rue Saint-Maur
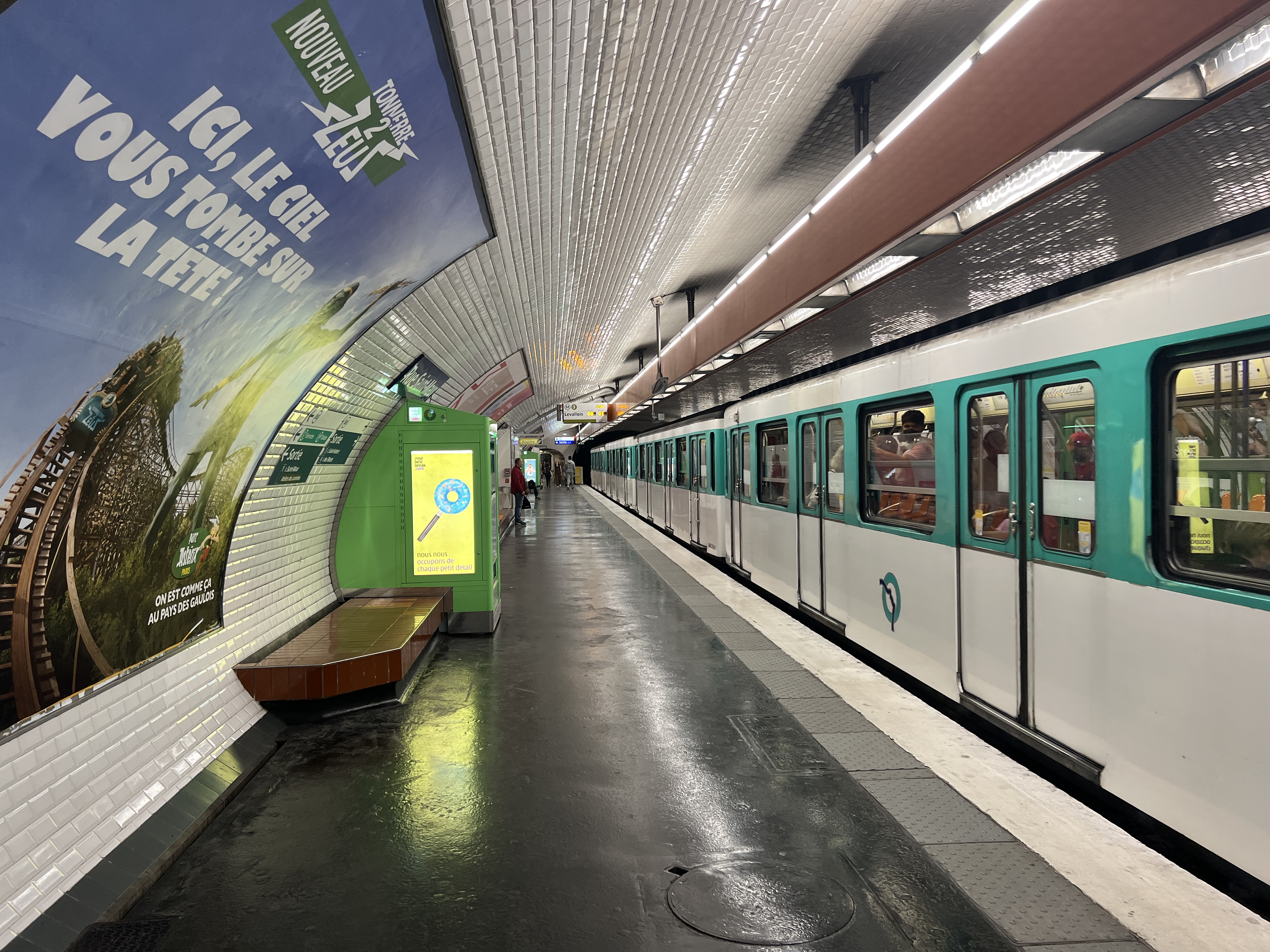

General information
- Location: 71, rue Servan; 91, rue Saint-Maur; 1, rue des Bleuets; 11th arrondissement of Paris; Île-de-France; France
- Coordinates: 48°51′52″N 2°22′46″E
- Owner: RATP
- Operator: RATP

Other information
- Fare zone: 1

History
- Opened: 19 October 1904

Services
Preceding station	Paris Metro	Following station
Parmentier towards Pont de Levallois–Bécon	Line 3	Père Lachaise towards Gallieni
Location
- Location within Paris

Rue Saint-Maur (French pronunciation: [ʁy sɛ̃ mɔʁ]) is a station on Paris Métro Line 3, located in the 11th arrondissement of Paris.

== Location ==
The station is located under Avenue de la République, between Rue Saint-Maur and Rue Servan. Approximately oriented along an east–west axis, it is located between the Parmentier and Père Lachaise stations.

== History ==
The station opened on 19 October 1904 as part of the first section of line 3 between Père Lachaise and Villiers.

The Rue Saint-Maur is named after Saint Maurus, a disciple of Saint Benedict of Nursia, who is said to have saved Saint Placid from drowning. It owes its initial name of Saint-Maur to its proximity to rue Saint-Maur, which corresponds to an old path which led from the Abbey of Saint-Maur to the Abbey of Saint-Denis. Until the early years of the 20th century the station was called Saint-Maur, but on 1 September 1998 its name was changed to avoid confusion with stations on RER line A in Saint-Maur-des-Fossés in the southeastern suburbs of Paris.

Like a third of the stations on the network, between 1974 and 1984 the station's platforms were renovated in the Andreu-Motte style, orange in this case. As part of the RATP's Renouveau du métro program, the station's corridors were renovated in the course of the 2000s.

In 2018, 3,065,770 travelers entered this station which placed it at 181st position of the metro stations for its usage.

== Passenger services ==
=== Access ===
The station has four entrance points established on Avenue de la République:

- entrance 1 – Rue Saint-Maur, consisting of a fixed staircase adorned with a Guimard ironwork listed as historic monument on 29 May 1978, leading to the right of no. 74 on the avenue;
- entrance 2 – Rue Servan, consisting of an escalator allowing only an exit to street level, located opposite No. 90 bis of the avenue;
- entrance 3 – Rue Saint-Hubert, consisting of a fixed staircase embellished with a mast with a yellow M inscribed in a circle, also located at the right of No. 90 bis of the avenue;
- entrance 4 – Rue des Bluets, also consisting of a fixed staircase, leading to no 79 on the avenue.

=== Station layout ===
Street Level

B1	Mezzanine

Line 3 platforms	Side platform, doors will open on the right
Line 3 platforms	Westbound	← toward Pont de Levallois – Bécon (Parmentier)
Line 3 platforms	Eastbound	toward Gallieni (Père Lachaise) →
Line 3 platforms	Side platform, doors will open on the right

=== Platforms ===
Rue Saint-Maur is a standard configuration station. It has two platforms separated by metro tracks and the vault is elliptical. The decoration is in the Andreu-Motte style with two orange-brown light strips, benches and some openings in the corridors treated with flat brown tiles with Motte seats in orange. The bevelled white ceramic tiles cover the walls, the vault, the tunnel exits, and the rest of the corridors. The advertising frames are metallic, and the name of the station is written in Parisine font on enamelled plates.

=== Bus connections ===
The station has no connections with the RATP Bus Network.

== Nearby ==
- ESCP Business School
- Lycée Voltaire
- Square Maurice-Gardette

== Gallery ==
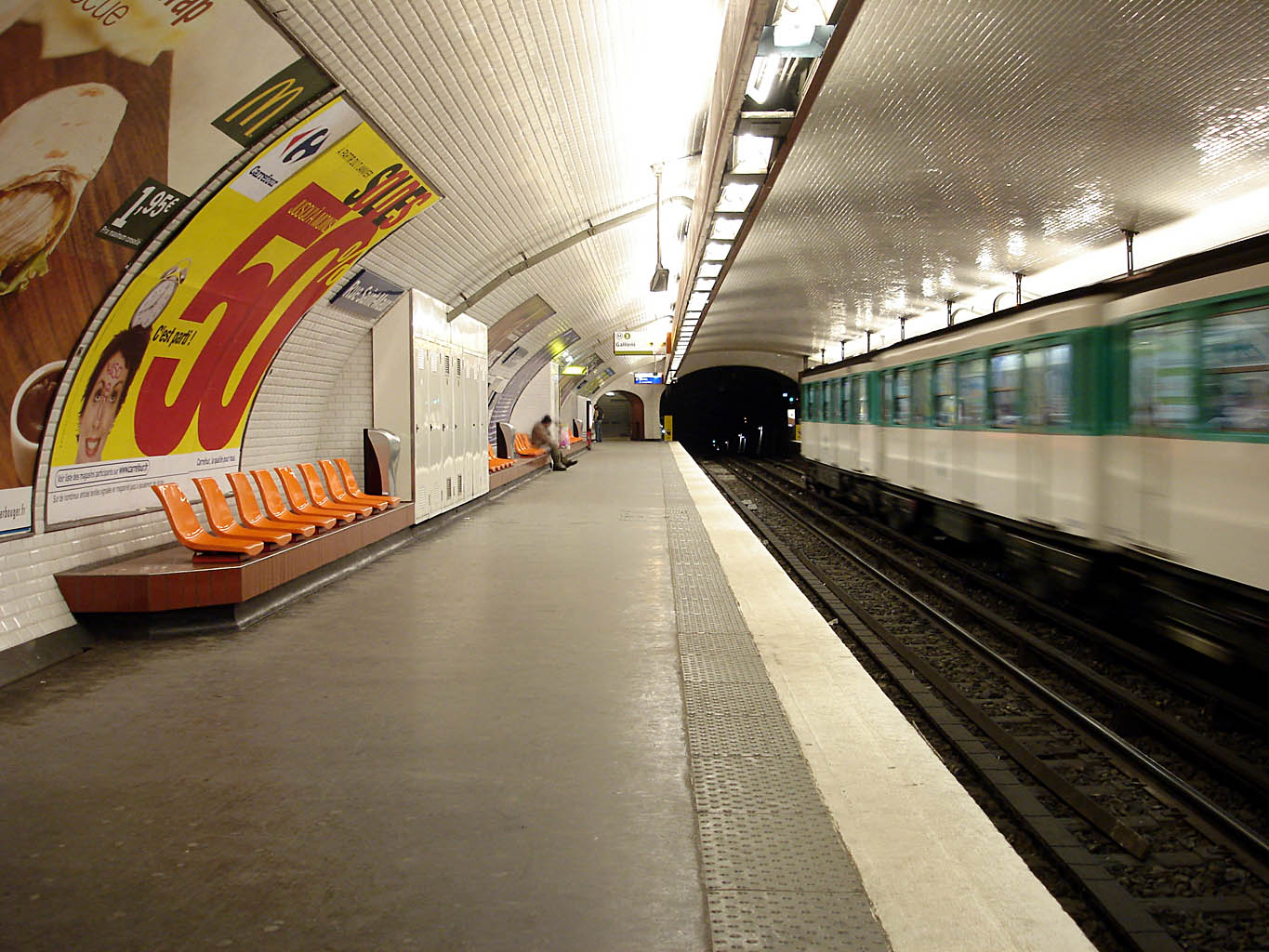
MF 67 rolling stock on Line 3 at Rue Saint-Maur

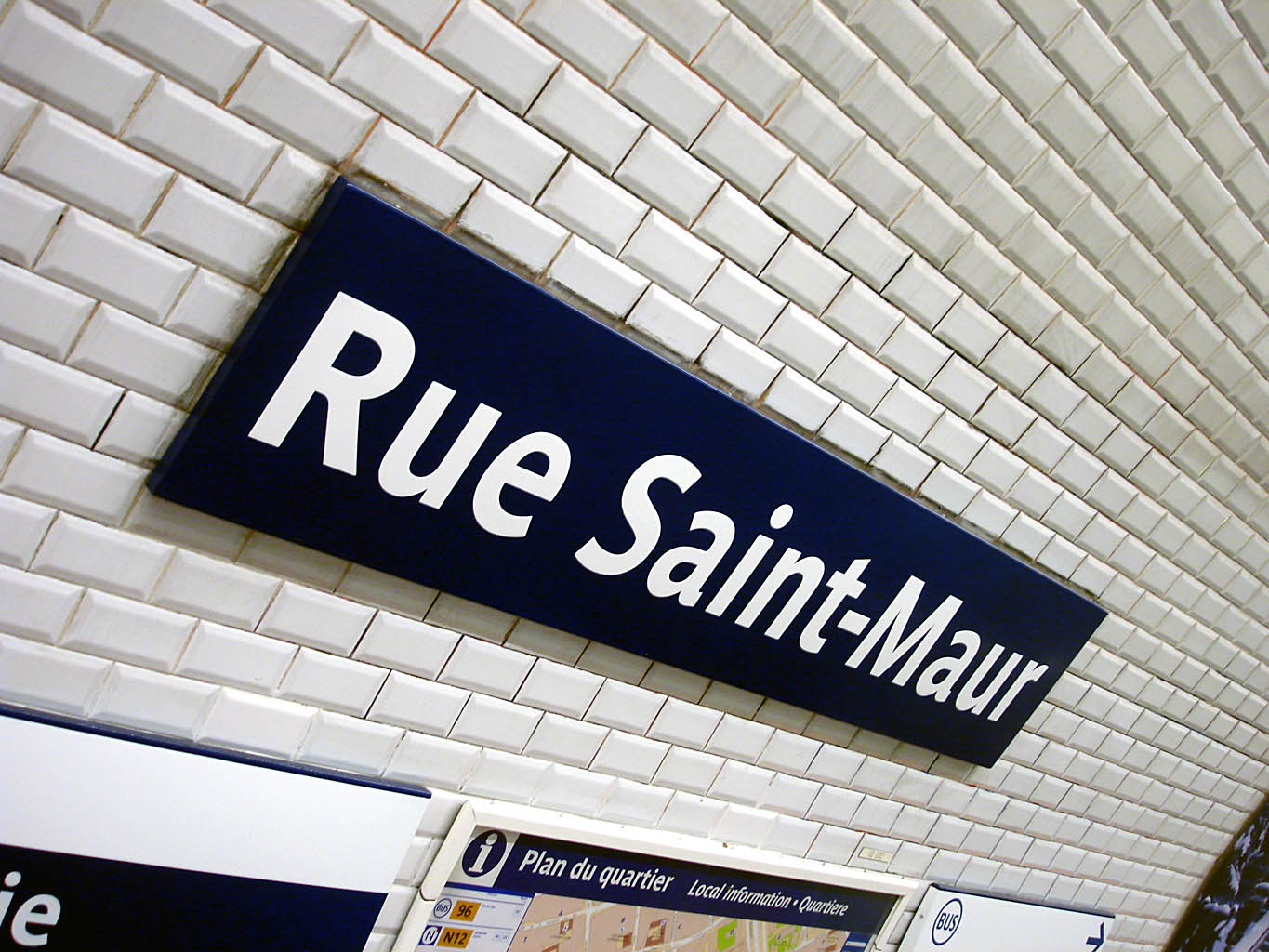
Platform signage
