= Louise Michel station =

Metro station in Paris, France

Louise Michel
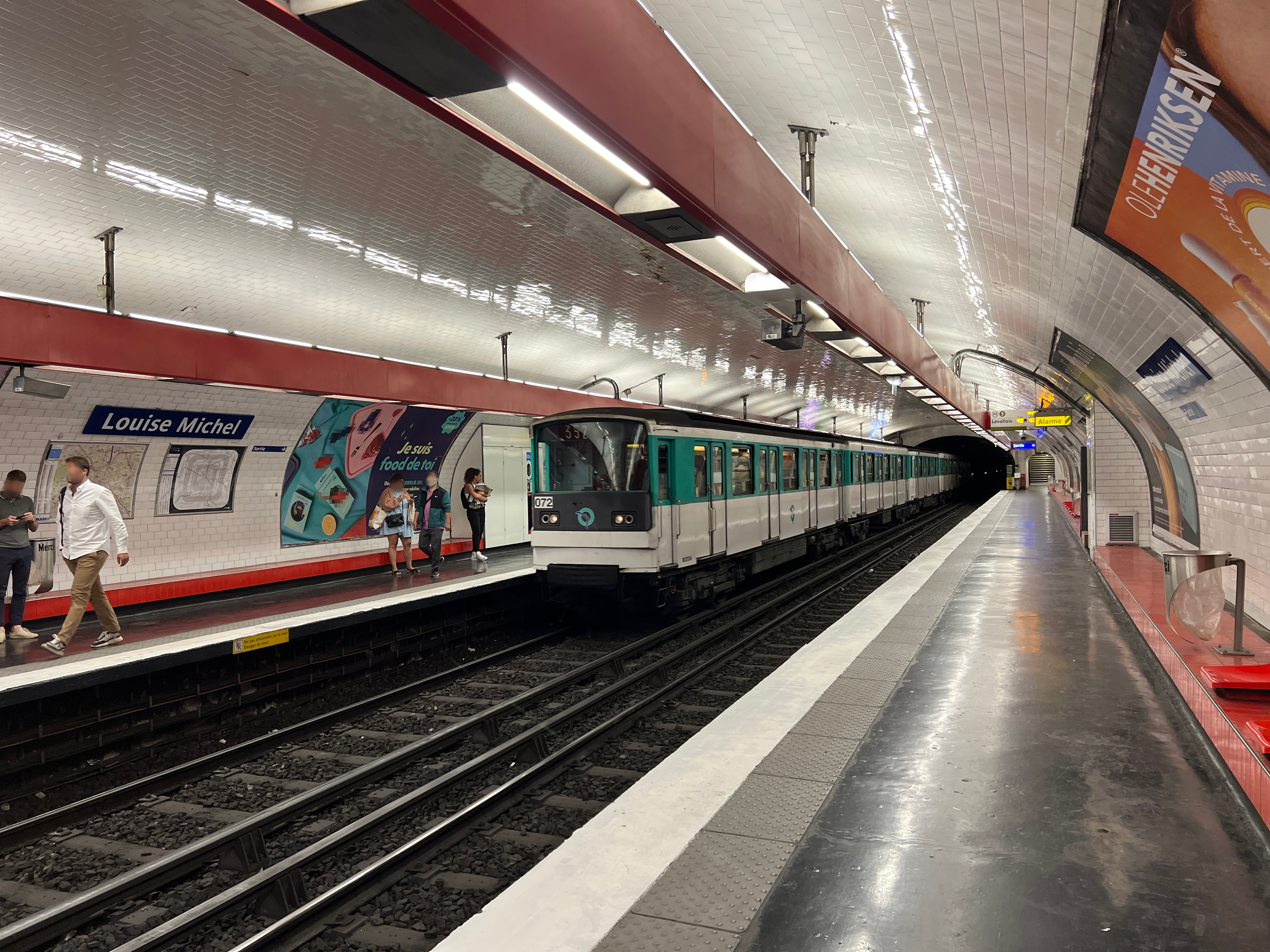

General information
- Location: 30, rue Louise Michel; Levallois-Perret; Île-de-France; France
- Coordinates: 48°53′21″N 2°17′17″E
- Owner: RATP
- Operator: RATP

Other information
- Fare zone: 2

History
- Opened: 24 September 1937

Services
Preceding station	Paris Metro	Following station
Anatole France towards Pont de Levallois–Bécon	Line 3	Porte de Champerret towards Gallieni
Location
- Location within Paris

Louise Michel (French pronunciation: [lwiz miʃɛl]) is a station on Paris Métro Line 3. It is located in the commune of Levallois-Perret, just outside Paris to the northwest.

== Location ==
The station is located about 100 meters from the administrative limit of Paris, under Rue Anatole-France, at the intersection with Rue Louise-Michel. Oriented along a north-west/south-east axis, it is located between the Anatole France and Porte de Champerret stations.

== History ==
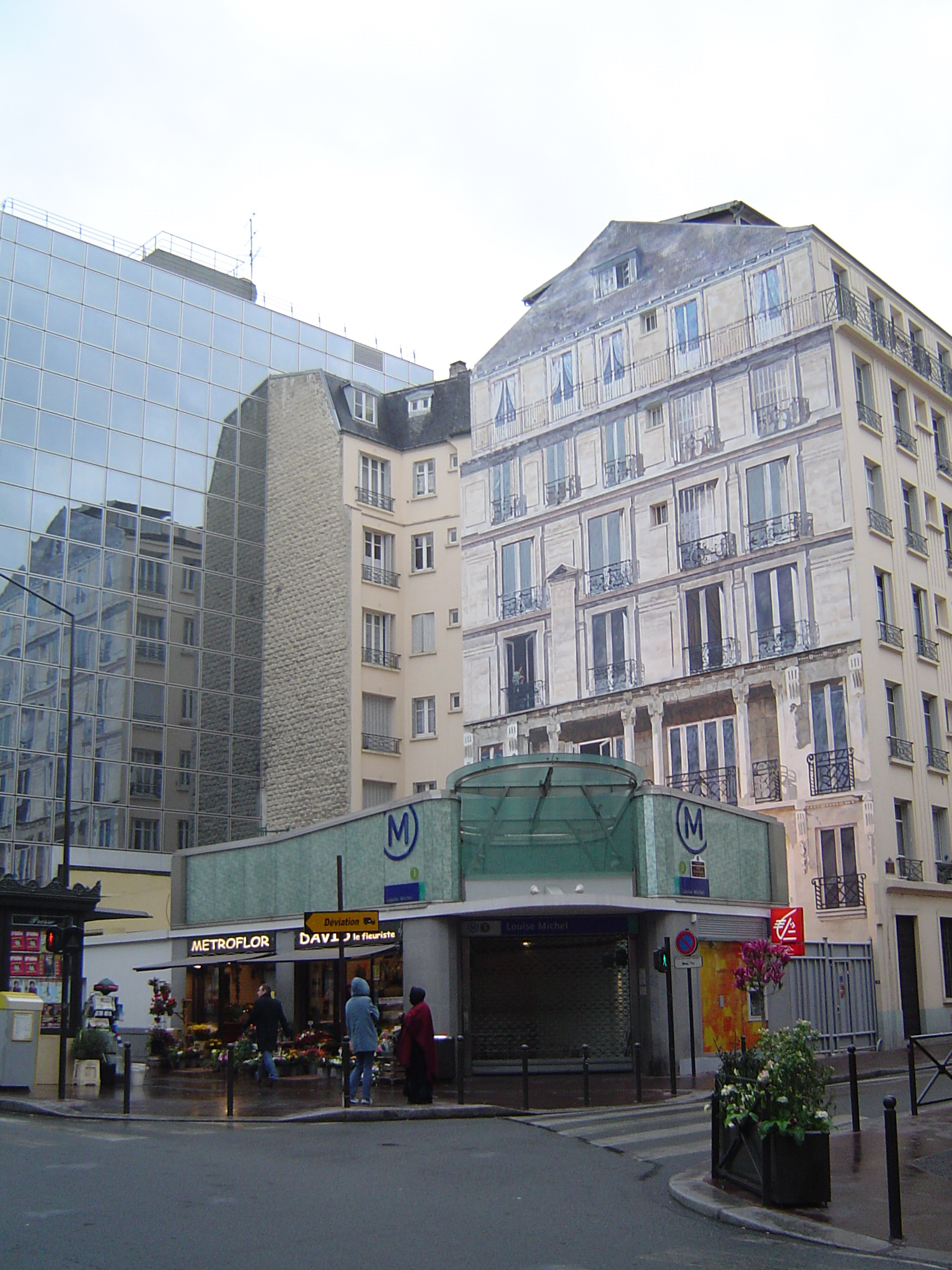
Above ground entrance

The station was opened on 24 September 1937 when the line was extended from Porte de Champerret to Pont de Levallois–Bécon. It was originally called Vallier, after a local street.

It was renamed on 1 May 1946 to "Louise Michel" in honour of the French anarchist and communarde, who is buried in the local cemetery.

The station is the fifth in a series of six in the network to have been given a name of a woman, after Barbès-Rochechouart (lines 2 and 4), Madeleine (lines 8, 12 and 14), Chardon-Lagache (line 10) and Boucicaut (line 8); followed by the Pierre-et-Marie Curie station (line 7), and pending the future stations Barbara (line 4) and Bagneux-Lucie Aubrac (lines 4 and 15).

Like a third of the stations in the network, between 1974 and 1984, the platforms were modernized in the Andreu-Motte style, in this case red in color with flat white tiles. As part of the RATP's Renouveau du métro project, the corridors were renovated on 27 July 2002.

In 2018, 3,807,962 passengers entered this station, which places it at the 138th position of the metro stations for its usage.

== Passenger services ==
=== Access ===
The station has two entrances:

- entrance 1 - Rue Louise-Michel found at ground level at no. 30 (rare case in the metro network), on the corner with rue Anatole-France;
- entrance 2 - Rue Anatole-France, consisting of an escalator allowing an exit only to the even numbers side of the street.

=== Station layout ===
Street Level

B1	Mezzanine

Line 3 platforms	Side platform, doors will open on the right
Line 3 platforms	Westbound	← toward Pont de Levallois – Bécon (Anatole France)
Line 3 platforms	Eastbound	toward Gallieni (Porte de Champerret) →
Line 3 platforms	Side platform, doors will open on the right

=== Platforms ===
Louise Michel is a standard configuration station. It has two platforms separated by the metro tracks and the vault is elliptical. The decoration is in the Andreu-Motte style with two red light canopies, benches covered with flat red tiles and red Motte seats. These arrangements are combined with the flat white ceramic tiles that cover the walls, the vault and the tunnel exits. The corridor outlets are treated with classic bevelled white tiles. The advertising frames are metallic, and the name of the station is written in Parisine font on enamelled plates. The station is distinguished by its platforms widths which are less than the standard configuration due to the narrowness of the street under which it was established, as well as by the lower part of its walls which, consequently, are vertical and not elliptical.

=== Bus connections ===
The station is served at night by lines N16 and N52 of the Noctilien bus network.

== See also ==
- Square Louise-Michel
- Kropotkinskaya
- Ricardo Flores Magón metro station
