= Parmentier station =

Metro station in Paris, France

Parmentier
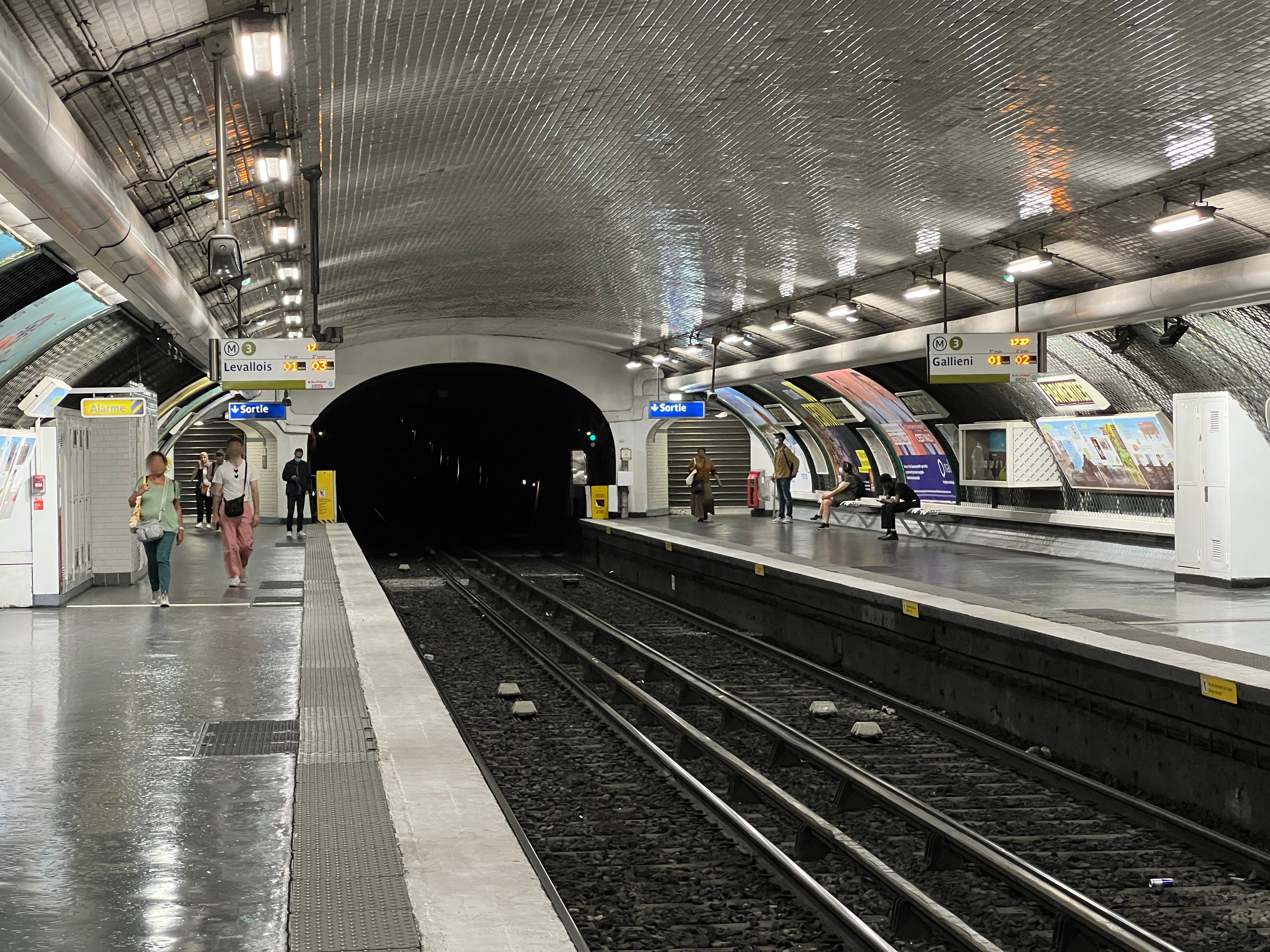

General information
- Location: 48, av. de la République; 11th arrondissement of Paris; Île-de-France; France
- Coordinates: 48°51′55″N 2°22′28″E
- Owner: RATP
- Operator: RATP

Other information
- Fare zone: 1

History
- Opened: 19 October 1904

Services
Preceding station	Paris Metro	Following station
République towards Pont de Levallois–Bécon	Line 3	Rue Saint-Maur towards Gallieni
Location
- Location within Paris

Parmentier (French pronunciation: [paʁmɑ̃tje]) is a station on Paris Métro Line 3 located in the 11th arrondissement of Paris.

== Location ==
The station is located under Avenue de la République, at the intersection with Avenue Parmentier and Rue Oberkampf. Oriented approximately along an east–west axis, it is located between République and Rue Saint-Maur stations.

== History ==
It was opened on 19 October 1904 as part of the first section of line 3 between Père Lachaise and Villiers.

It is on the Avenue Parmentier, which is named after the military pharmacist, agronomist, nutritionist and hygienist Antoine-Augustin Parmentier (1737-1813), promoter of cultivating the potato as a food source (for humans) in France and throughout Europe.

Like one station out of three in the 1950s and 1960s, the platforms were modernized with metallic bodywork, but distinguished by its atypical mesh design, incorporating a cultural arrangement dedicated to Antoine Parmentier and the potato.

As part of the RATP's Metro Renewal program, the station's corridors were renovated on 2 September 2002.

In 2018, 3,283,276 passengers entered this station which placed it at the 171st position of the metro stations for its usage.

== Passenger services ==
=== Access ===
The station has a single access called Avenue Parmentier, opening at the angle formed by Rue Édouard-Lockroy and the former. Consisting of a fixed staircase, it is adorned with a Guimard entrance, which was decreed as a historic monument on 12 February 12, 2016.

=== Station layout ===
Street Level

B1	Mezzanine

Line 3 platforms	Side platform, doors will open on the right
Line 3 platforms	Westbound	← toward Pont de Levallois – Bécon (République)
Line 3 platforms	Eastbound	toward Gallieni (Rue Saint-Maur) →
Line 3 platforms	Side platform, doors will open on the right

=== Platforms ===
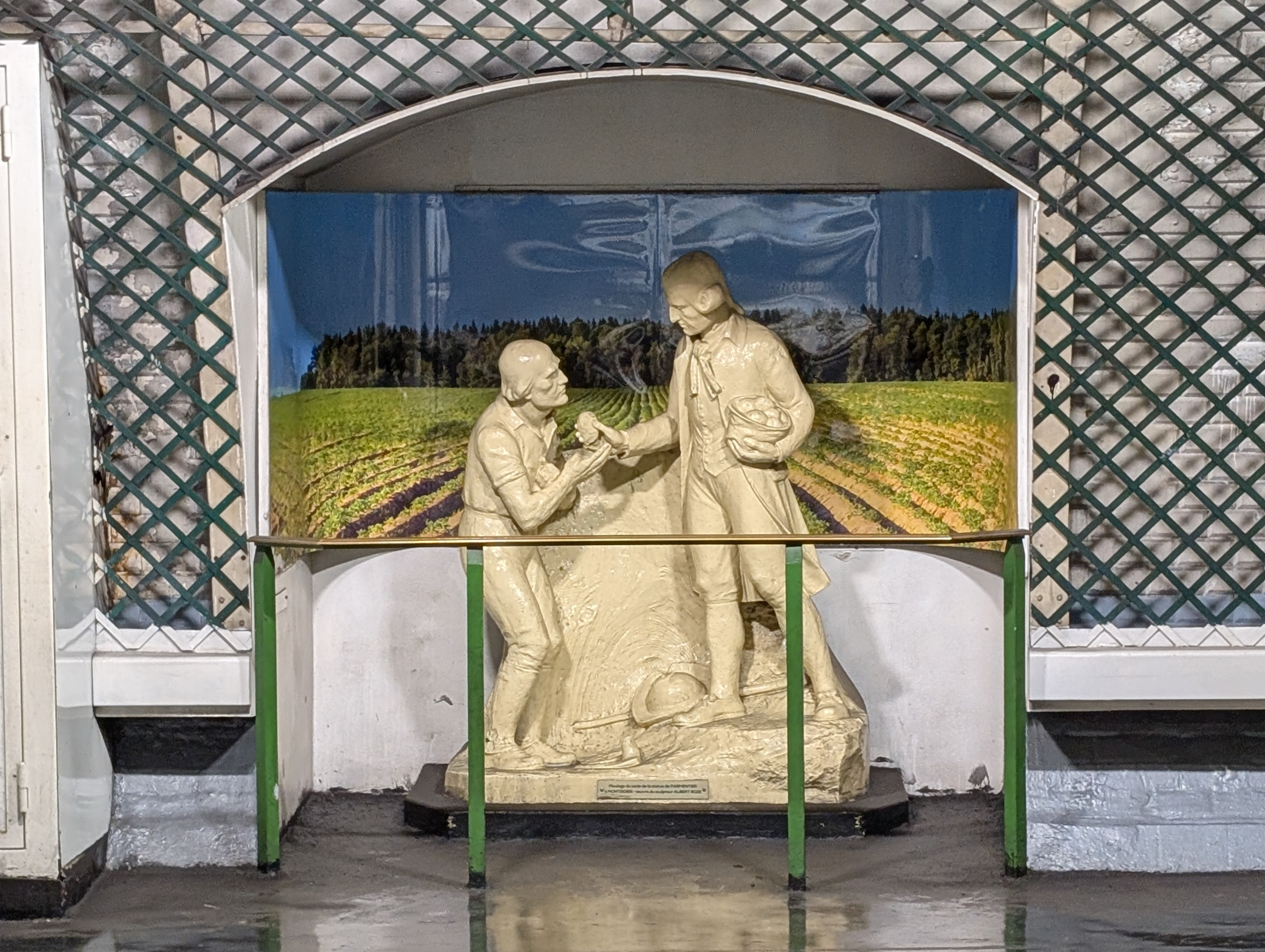
Statue of Antoine-Augustin Parmentier

Parmentier is a standard configuration station. It has two platforms separated by the metro tracks and the vault is elliptical. The decoration is cultural on the theme of the potato. The walls sheathed with metal panels typical of the 1950s having the particularity of being grilled to evoke the cracks of the potato net, while a statue of Antoine-Augustin Parmentier distributing potatoes is displayed in a niche built into the wall of the platform in the direction of Gallieni.

On each platform, display cases with objects from Pre-Columbian America are installed. The body, fitted with white horizontal uprights and lighted dark green advertising frames, is also adorned with one of the panels presenting the history of the potato and its uses according to the varieties and the quality of French production. The enamelled nameplates incorporated into the metal panels are among the last in the network to indicate the station's name in yellow capital letters on a black background, an initial characteristic of the metal panel stations which it only shares with Falguière on line 12. The furnishings are complemented by white seats of a unique model hugging the buttocks of travellers. The bevelled white ceramic tiles cover the walls, the vault and the tunnel exits, and the lighting is provided by independent strips.

=== Bus connections ===
The station is served by bus lines 20, 46 and 96 of the RATP Bus Network and, at night, by lines N12 and N23 of the Noctilien bus network.
