= Anatole France station =

Metro station in Paris, France

Anatole France
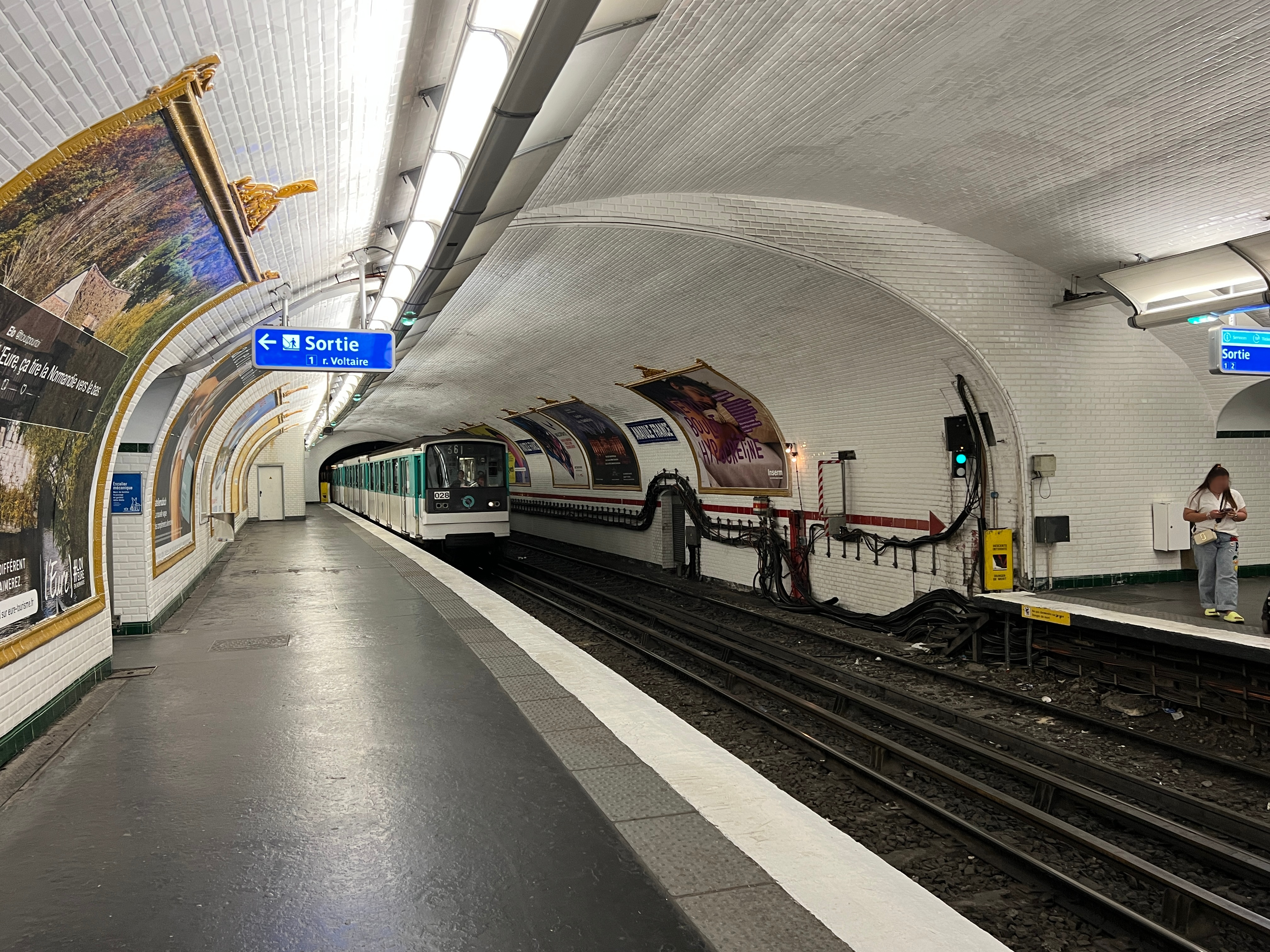

General information
- Location: Place Général Leclerc; Levallois-Perret; Île-de-France; France
- Coordinates: 48°53′31″N 2°17′08″E
- Owner: RATP
- Operator: RATP

Other information
- Fare zone: 2

History
- Opened: 24 September 1937

Services
Preceding station	Paris Metro	Following station
Pont de Levallois–Bécon Terminus	Line 3	Louise Michel towards Gallieni
Location
- Location within Paris

Anatole France (French pronunciation: [anatɔl fʁɑ̃s]) is a station on Paris Métro Line 3. It is located in the commune of Levallois-Perret, northwest of the capital.

== Location ==
The station is located under Rue Anatole-France in Levallois-Perret at the intersection with Rue Voltaire.

== History ==
It was opened on 24 September 1937 when the line was extended from Porte de Champerret to Pont de Levallois–Bécon.

The station is on the Rue Anatole France, which is named after the author Anatole France, winner of the Nobel Prize in Literature in 1921.

In 2018, 3,734,650 passengers entered this station, which placed it at 140th position of the metro stations for its usage.

Since June 2017, the station has benefited from a renovation aimed at alleviating leakage problems and was completed by 31 December 2018.

== Passenger services ==
=== Access ===
The station has two entrances and an escalator, located on Place du Général-Leclerc.

=== Station layout ===
Street Level

B1	Mezzanine

Line 3 platforms	Side platform, doors will open on the right
Line 3 platforms	Westbound	← toward Pont de Levallois – Bécon (Terminus)
Line 3 platforms	Eastbound	toward Gallieni (Louise Michel) →
Line 3 platforms	Side platform, doors will open on the right

=== Platforms ===
Anatole France is a standard configuration station. It has two platforms, 105 meters long, separated by the metro tracks, and the vault is elliptical. The platforms are partially offset (like Saint-Germain-des-Prés) due to the narrow width of the street under which they are located. The Commerce and Liège stations have platforms that are completely offset for the same reason. The decoration is of the style used for most metro stations. The lighting canopies are white and rounded in the Gaudin style of the renouveau du métro of the 2000s, and the bevelled white ceramic tiles cover the walls, the vault, and the tunnel exits. The advertising frames are faience in a honey colour and the name of the station is also of faience. It is equipped with benches.

=== Bus connections ===
The station is served by lines 174 of the RATP Bus Network and at night, by lines N16 and N52 of the Noctilien network.

== Nearby ==
- Mairie de Levallois-Perret
- Parc de la Planchette, open to the public in 1924
- Temple de la Petite Étoile

== Gallery ==
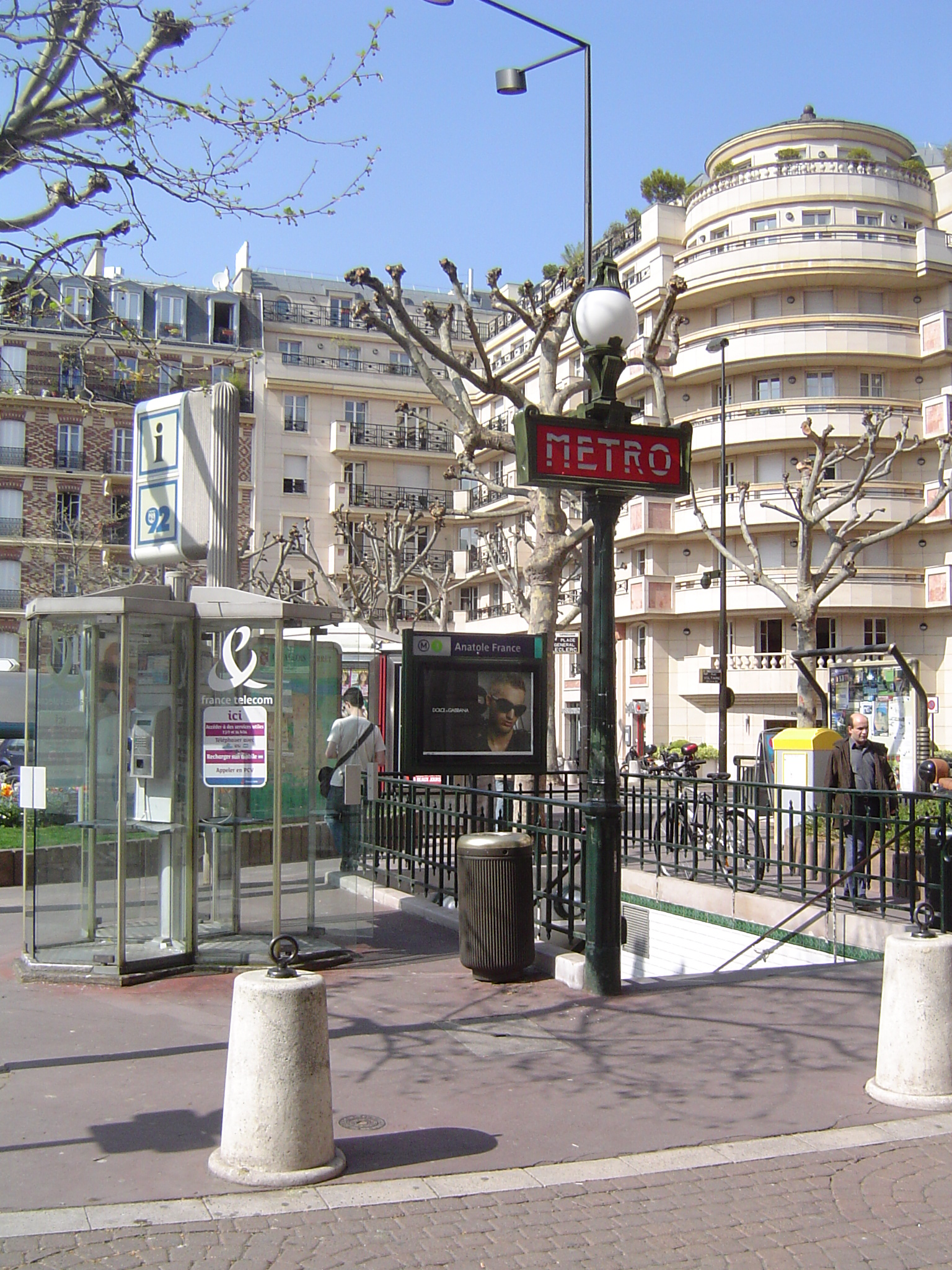
Street-level entrance

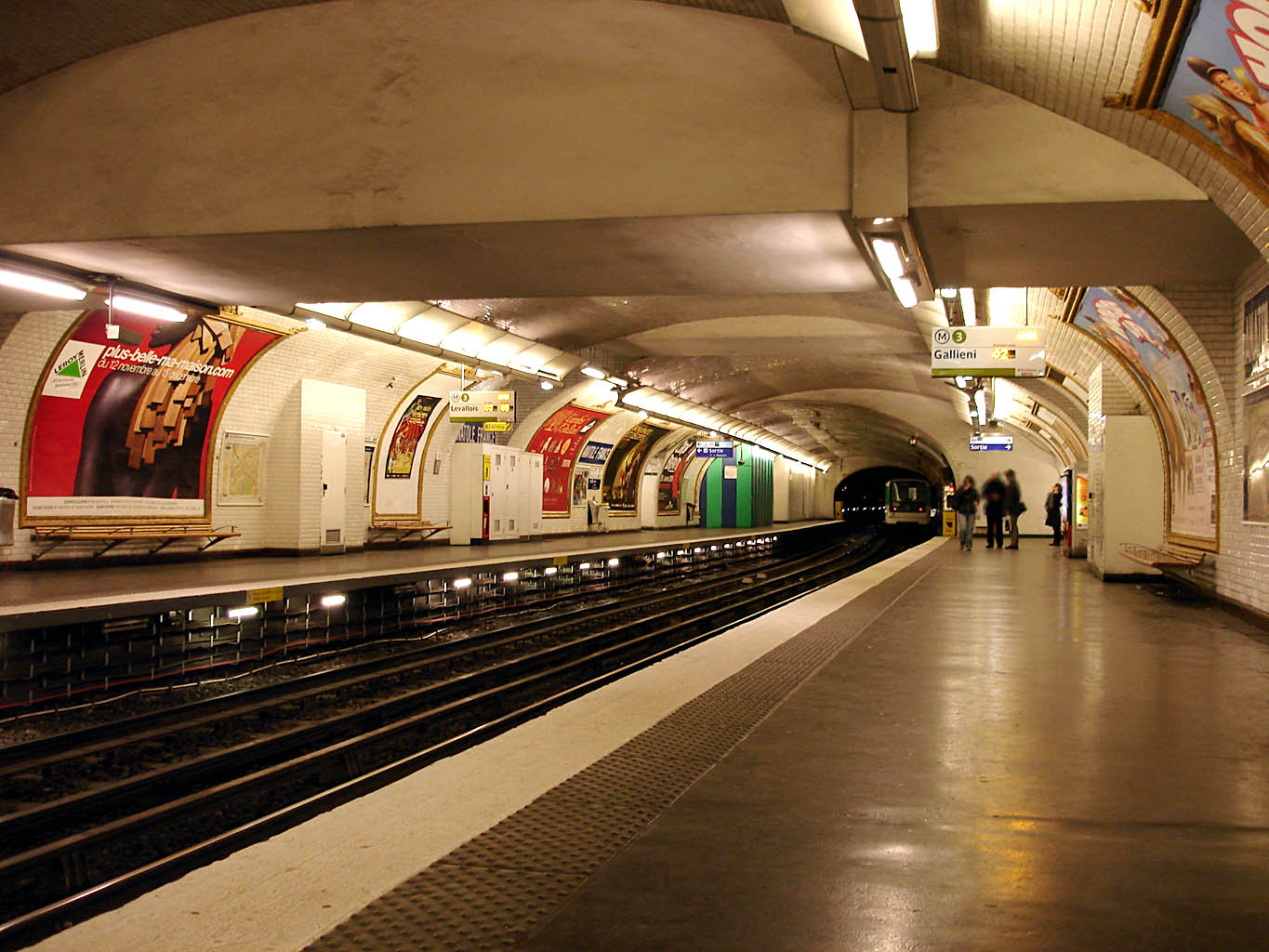
Line 3 platforms

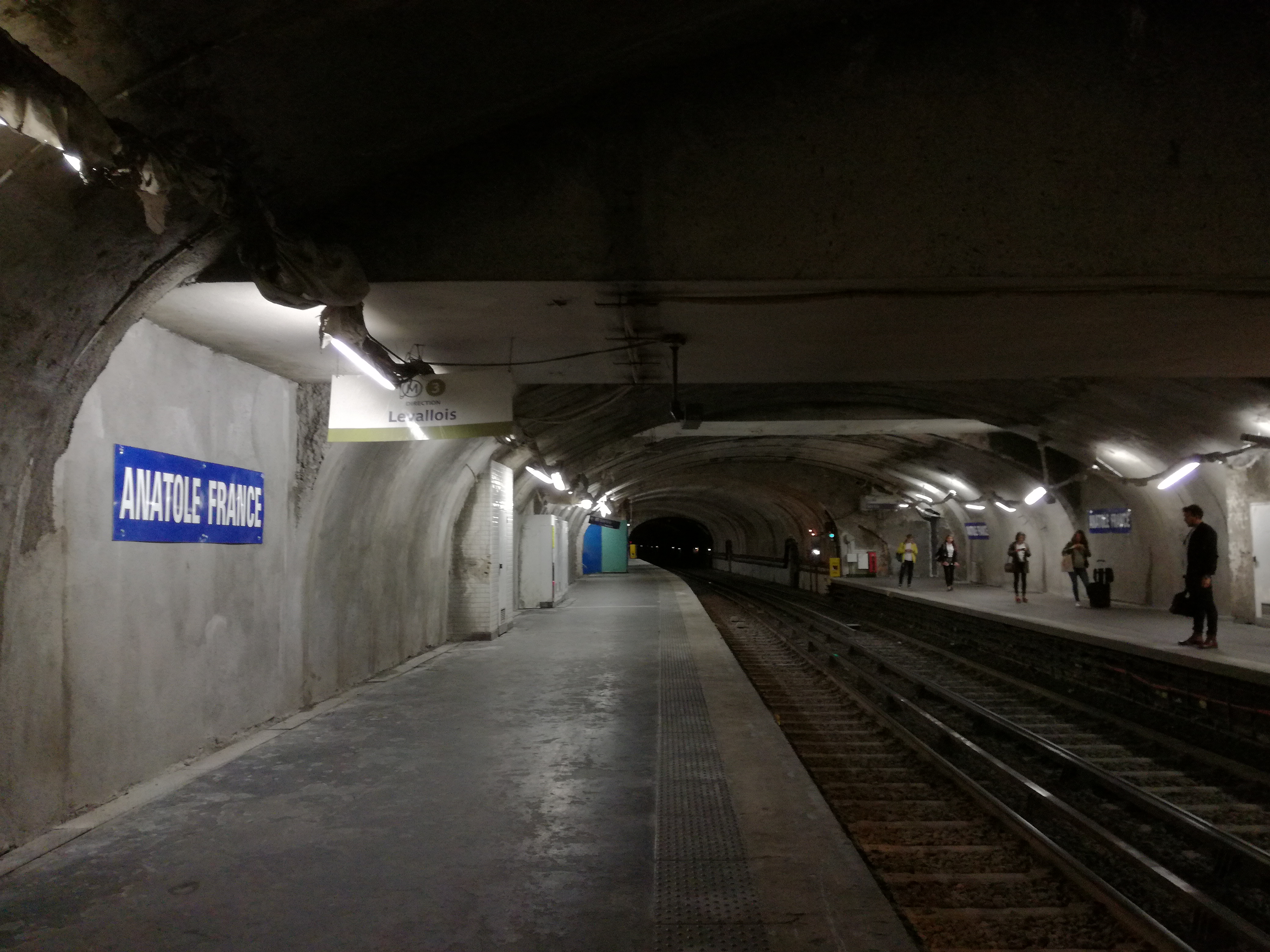
Platforms prior renovation
