= Lucien Letailleur =

French footballer (born 1885)

Personal information
- Full name: Lucien Marie Letailleur
- Date of birth: 17 May 1885
- Place of birth: 3rd arrondissement of Paris, France
- Date of death: 6 November 1957 (aged 72)
- Place of death: 15th arrondissement of Paris, France
- Position: Midfielder

Senior career*
Years	Team	Apps	(Gls)
1912–1914	FEC Levallois		

International career
1912	Paris XI	1	(0)
1913	France	1	(0)
- * Club domestic league appearances and goals

Lucien Marie Letailleur (17 April 1885 – 6 November 1957) was a French footballer who played as a midfielder for FEC Levallois and the French national team in the early 1910s.

== Early life ==
Born on 17 April 1885 in 3rd arrondissement of Paris, Letailleur began playing football with a tin can as a ball, in the company of Marcel Triboulet and Pierre Chayriguès, whom he had met while attended the independent school in Levallois-Perret.

== Playing career ==
Letailleur began his career at his hometown club FEC Levallois in 1912, aged 17. A few months later, on 8 December 1912, Vialmonteil played for a Paris selection (LFA) in a friendly match against a London XI.

One month later, on 12 January 1913, he earned his first (and only) international cap in a friendly against Italy at Stade Paris in Saint-Ouen, helping his side to a 1–0 victory. The following day, the journalists of French newspaper L'Auto (the future L'Équipe) described his performance as "very sure; he did make a big mistake in the first half, but he made up for it immediately; we cannot therefore hold it against him". He was recalled as a substitute the following month against Belgium, but he did not leave the bench. Outside football, he was a car fitter recognizable by the scar on his forehead.

== Later life ==
Mobilized during the outbreak of World War I in 1914, Letailleur was wounded by a bullet in the right arm at the beginning of the war, being later captured and interned in Merseburg, near Leipzig, in February 1916, where he stayed for nearly three years, until he was finally repatriated from Germany in January 1919 and demobilized two months later.

After the War, Letailleur remained linked to the world of football, notably sitting on the sports commission of the Parisian league in 1922, and being awarded a gold medal from the Paris League in June 1928.

== Death ==
Letailleur died in the 15th arrondissement of Paris on 6 November 1957, at the age of 72.

== Bibliography ==
- Perry, Raphaël (2021). Bleus éphémères [Ephemeral blues] (in French). Paris: Hugo Sport. p. 40. ISBN 978-2-7556-9244-0.
