= Levallois-Perret =

- Commune
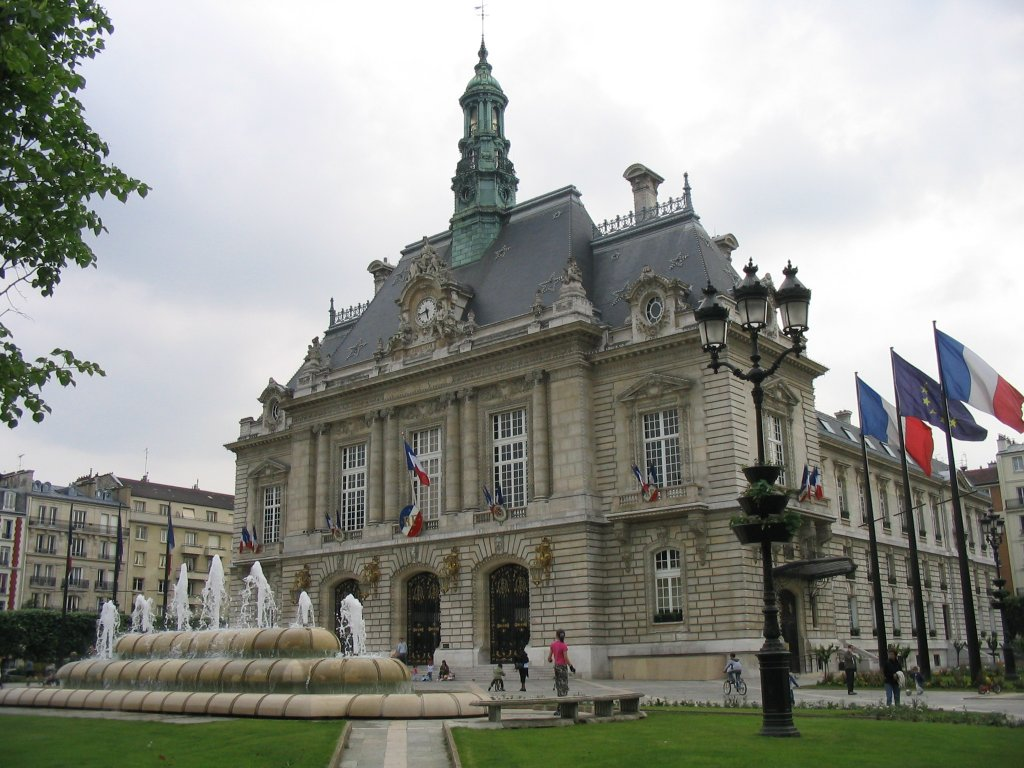
- The Hôtel de Ville of Levallois-Perret

- Coat of arms

- Location of Levallois-Perret
- Location within France Location within Île-de-France (region)
- Coordinates: 48°53′42″N 2°17′14″E
- Country: France
- Region: Île-de-France
- Department: Hauts-de-Seine
- Arrondissement: Nanterre
- Canton: Levallois-Perret
- Intercommunality: Grand Paris; EPT Paris Ouest La Défense

Government
  - Mayor (2026–32): Agnès Pottier-Dumas
- Area^{1}: 2.41 km^{2} (0.93 sq mi)
- Highest elevation: 34 m (112 ft)
- Lowest elevation: 23 m (75 ft)
- Population (2023): 68,092
  - Density: 28,300/km^{2} (73,200/sq mi)
- Time zone: UTC+01:00 (CET)
  - Summer (DST): UTC+02:00 (CEST)
- INSEE/Postal code: 92044 /92300
- ^{1} French Land Register data, which excludes lakes, ponds, glaciers > 1 km^{2} (0.386 sq mi or 247 acres) and river estuaries.

Levallois-Perret (French pronunciation: [ləvalwa pɛʁɛ]) is a commune in the Hauts-de-Seine department and Île-de-France region of north-central France. It lies on the right bank of the Seine, some 6 km (3.7 mi) from the centre of Paris in the north-western suburbs of the French capital. It is the most densely populated town in Europe and, together with neighbouring Neuilly-sur-Seine, one of the most expensive suburbs of Paris.

== Name ==
The name Levallois-Perret comes from two housing developments, Champerret (started by landowner Jean-Jacques Perret in 1822) and Village Levallois (founded by developer Nicolas-Eugène Levallois in 1845), which resulted in the incorporation of the commune.

== History ==
On the territory of what is now Levallois-Perret, before the French Revolution, stood the village of Villiers and the hamlet of Courcelles (or La Planchette). They now give their names to two Paris Métro stations. At the time of the creation of French communes during the French Revolution, they were part of the commune of Clichy, and the commune of Neuilly-sur-Seine extended over what is now the south-western part of Levallois-Perret.

Landowner Jean-Jacques Perret initiated a number of housing developments in 1822 in the northeast of the commune of Neuilly-sur-Seine, in a place which soon came to be known as Champerret ("champ Perret": "Perret field") and would later give its name to a station on the Paris Métro. Later in 1845, Nicolas-Eugène Levallois began to develop housing on behalf of André Noël, who owned land near La Planchette (in the commune of Clichy). The land developed by Levallois soon became known as the Village Levallois.

In the 1860s, the village had grown to the point of forming a single built-up area and several requests were made to the authorities for the area to be incorporated as a commune.

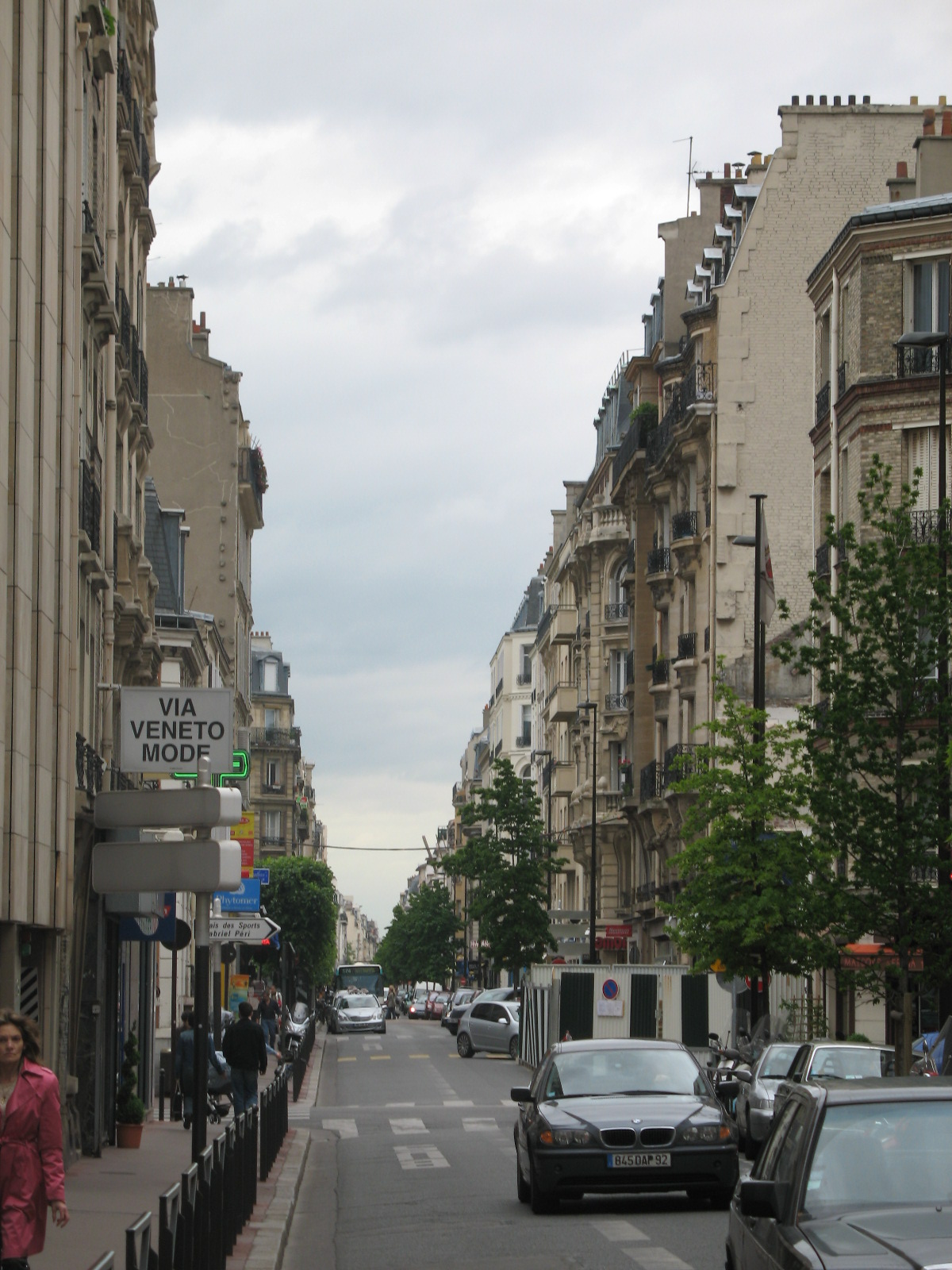
Typical street in Levallois

Eventually the requests were acceded to and on 30 June 1866 the commune of Levallois-Perret was eventually created by detaching that part of the territory of Clichy on which the Village Levallois stood and merging it with that part of Neuilly-sur-Seine occupied by Champerret.

During the repression of January and February 1894, the police conducted raids targeting the anarchists living there, without much success.

The Hôtel de Ville was completed in 1898.

The Eiffel company had its factory in the commune, and it was therefore in Levallois-Perret that the structures of both the Statue of Liberty and the Eiffel Tower were built.

Levallois-Perret became an important centre of the early French automotive industry with the establishment there of such companies as Clément-Bayard, Delage, and the coachbuilders Chapron and Faget & Varnet. Citroën purchased the Clément-Bayard factory and produced the famous Citroën 2CV there for nearly forty years. Levallois-Perret was also an important centre of the cosmetics industry in the early 20th century. It is also home to the large European commercial real estate company Atisreal and to the conglomerate Alstom.

The northern part of the famous Île de la Jatte, in the river Seine, is where French impressionist painters created many of their masterpieces.

Patrick Balkany had been the mayor of Levallois-Perret from 2001 until 2020. He was also mayor during the period 1983–95. The current mayor, elected in 2020, is Agnès Pottier-Dumas.

== Demographics ==
Historical population

Year	Pop.	±% p.a.
1866	15,763	—
1872	19,158	+3.30%
1876	22,744	+4.38%
1881	29,519	+5.35%
1886	35,649	+3.85%
1891	39,857	+2.26%
1896	47,315	+3.49%
1901	58,073	+4.18%
1906	61,920	+1.29%
1911	68,703	+2.10%
1921	73,639	+0.70%
1926	75,144	+0.41%
1931	71,181	−1.08%

Year	Pop.	±% p.a.
1936	65,186	−1.74%
1946	61,681	−0.55%
1954	62,871	+0.24%
1962	61,804	−0.21%
1968	58,941	−0.79%
1975	52,523	−1.63%
1982	53,500	+0.26%
1990	47,548	−1.46%
1999	54,700	+1.57%
2007	63,225	+1.83%
2012	64,654	+0.45%
2017	64,379	−0.09%
2023	68,092	+0.94%

Source: EHESS and INSEE (1968–2023)

=== Immigration ===
Place of birth of residents of Levallois-Perret in 1999
Born in metropolitan France	Born outside metropolitan France			
82.5%	17.5%			
82.5%	Born in overseas France	Born in foreign countries with French citizenship at birth^{1}	EU-15 immigrants^{2}	Non-EU-15 immigrants
82.5%	0.9%	3.5%	4.4%	8.7%
^{1} This group is made up largely of former French settlers, such as pieds-noirs in Northwest Africa, followed by former colonial citizens who had French citizenship at birth (such as was often the case for the native elite in French colonies), as well as to a lesser extent foreign-born children of French expatriates. A foreign country is understood as a country not part of France in 1999, so a person born for example in 1950 in Algeria, when Algeria was an integral part of France, is nonetheless listed as a person born in a foreign country in French statistics.^{2} An immigrant is a person born in a foreign country not having French citizenship at birth. An immigrant may have acquired French citizenship since moving to France, but is still considered an immigrant in French statistics. On the other hand, persons born in France with foreign citizenship (the children of immigrants) are not listed as immigrants.

== Twin towns ==
- Molenbeek-Saint-Jean, Belgium
- The Schöneberg district of Berlin, Germany

== Adjoining communes ==
Clockwise from the north:

- Asnières-sur-Seine
- Clichy
- Paris
- Neuilly-sur-Seine
- Courbevoie

== Administration ==
Levallois-Perret makes up the whole of the canton of Levallois-Perret.

== Economy ==
Alstom has its headquarters in Levallois-Perret. Speed Rabbit Pizza also has its headquarters in the commune. EVA Air has its Paris office in Levallois-Perret. According to Le Journal du Net, the debt per inhabitant of Levallois is 9,030 euros, the French record. Saft Groupe S.A., a subsidiary of Total S.A. in the battery manufacturing industry, is also based in Levallois-Perret.

Previously, Carrefour had its head office in Levallois-Perret.

== Education ==
Public preschools and elementary schools:

- Alfred-de-Musset
- Anatole-France
- Buffon
- George-Sand
- Jules-Ferry
- Maurice-Ravel
- Saint-Exupéry
- Edith Gorce-Franklin (intercommunal school in Neuilly-sur-Seine which serves residents of Levallois in île de la Jatte, quai Charles-Pasqua, and adjacent and/or parallel streets)

Public preschools:

- Charles-Perrault
- Jean-Jaurès
- Louis-Pasteur

Public elementary schools:

- Françoise-Dolto
- Jean-de-La-Fontaine

Private preschools and elementary schools:

- Ecole maternelle et élémentaire Sainte-Marie-de-la-Providence
- Ecole maternelle et élémentaire Emilie-Brandt

Junior high schools (public junior high schools are operated by the department of Hauts-de-Seine):

- Collège Danton
- Collège Jean-Jaurès
- Collège Louis-Blériot
- Collège privé Saint-Justin

Senior high schools/sixth-form colleges (public high schools/sixth-form colleges are operated by the Île-de-France region):

- Lycée Léonard de Vinci

Lycée Montalembert is in nearby Courbevoie

Post-secondary:

- École supérieure des techniques aéronautiques et de construction automobile (FR) are in the city.

== Transport ==
Levallois-Perret is served by three stations on Paris Métro Line 3: Louise Michel, Anatole France, and Pont de Levallois–Bécon.

It is also served by Clichy–Levallois station on the Transilien Paris-Saint-Lazare suburban rail line.

The municipality of Levallois-Perret operates two free bus lines circulating the town.

== Sport ==
Levallois Sporting Club is one of the most important sports club in France with 14500 members. Among them you can find notable sportsperson like Teddy Riner, Gauthier Grumier and Gévrise Émane. During his youth Didier Drogba played for the football section, as Joakim Noah did in basketball before moving to the United States for high school and college play and eventually the NBA.

LSC continues to operate teams in a wide variety of sports, but basketball is no longer among them. In 2007, the LSC basketball section merged with Paris Basket Racing, creating Paris-Levallois Basket, which after two name changes in the last half of the 2010s is now known as Metropolitans 92.

== Coat of arms ==
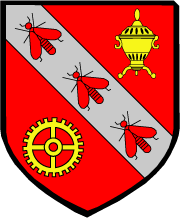
Levallois-Perret's coat of arms

The modern logo

The traditional coat of arms for the municipality puts emphasis on the importance of industry in its history. The centre of the arms consists of a shield with red background; a yellow gearwheel in the bottom left and a yellow perfume diffuser in the top right represent the mechanical and perfume industries.

Three red bees, are depicted on a silver bend from the top left to bottom right of the shield, these are another symbol of work in the city, beekeeping taking place at the île de la Jatte. The coat of arms also has a wreath at the bottom around the shield and three castles topping the shield; both in yellow. VILLE DE / LEVALLOIS – PERRET, is inscribed in black letters above the coat of arms.

A cartoon-style bee is used in the modern emblem of the municipality.

== Notable people ==
- Clare Anderson (1909–1996), performer at the Casino de Paris, lived here
- Richard Aurili, sculptor, lived here
- Olivier Besancenot (1974), politician
- Freda Betti (1924–1979), opera singer married in Levallois-Perret in 1949
- Henri Betti (1917–2005), composer resident in Levallois-Perret when he married in 1949
- Clotilde Courau (1969), actress
- Jules David (1848–1923), photographer
- Danièle Delorme (1926–2015), actress and film producer
- Gauthier Diafutua (1985), footballer
- Sofiane Feghouli (1989), footballer
- René Hervil (1881–1960), actor, screenwriter and film director
- Pascal Lamy (1947), director-general of the World Trade Organization
- Rénald Metelus, footballer
- Louise Michel (1830–1905), French anarchist, is buried in the local cemetery
- William Snook (1861–1916), English running champion, was living in the town in September 1895, when he was accused of theft. He was subsequently acquitted, although his English landlord was convicted
- Louis Trousselier (1881–1939), cyclist
- Roger Rabiniaux (1914–1986), prefect, writer and poet
- Gustave Eiffel (1832–1923), architect; in 1866, set up his own workshops at 48 Rue Fouquet

== See also ==
- Optique & Précision de Levallois
- Levallois technique
- Communes of the Hauts-de-Seine department
- 2017 Levallois-Perret attack
