= Canton of Levallois-Perret =

Administrative division of Hauts-de-Seine, France

Coordinates: 48.89°N 2.29°E

The canton of Levallois-Perret is an administrative division of the Hauts-de-Seine department, in northern France. It was created at the French country canton reorganisation which came into effect in March 21st 2015. Its seat is in Levallois-Perret. It Economically helps stabilize the city and make it more independent with their own economy

It consists of the following communes:

1. Levallois-Perret
