= Hôtel de Ville, Levallois-Perret =

Town hall in Levallois-Perret, France

Hôtel de Ville
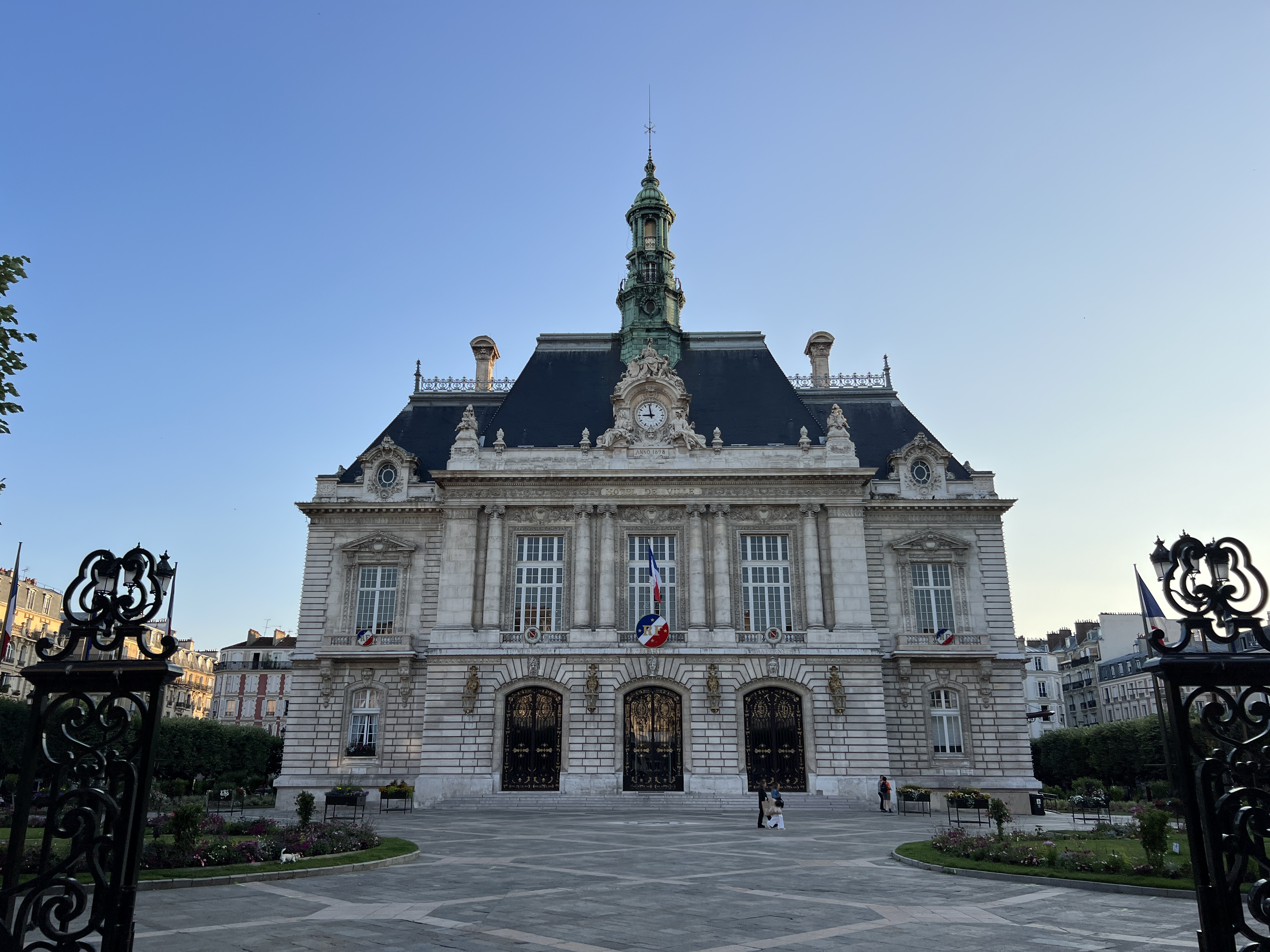
- The main frontage of the Hôtel de Ville in July 2023
- Interactive map of the Hôtel de Ville area

General information
- Type: City hall
- Architectural style: Louis XIV style
- Location: Levallois-Perret, France
- Coordinates: 48.8928°N 2.2878°E
- Completed: 1898

Height
- Height: 51 metres (167 ft)

Design and construction
- Architect: Léon Jamin

The Hôtel de Ville (French pronunciation: [otɛl də vil], City Hall) is a municipal building in Levallois-Perret, Hauts-de-Seine, in the northwestern suburbs of Paris, France, standing on Place de la République. It has been included on the Inventaire général des monuments by the French Ministry of Culture since 1995.

== History ==
In 1865, the industrialist, Émile Rivay, donated a house at Nos. 96-98 Rue de Courcelles (now Rue du Président-Wilson) to the village of Levallois-Perret. After Levallois-Perret was separated from the commune of Clichy in June 1866, the new town council, led by the mayor, Paul Caillard, initially selected this property as its meeting place.

The council had ambitions to commission a purpose-built town hall. Progress was delayed by the Franco-Prussian War of 1870 but, in 1871, the council selected and purchased a site on what is now Place de la République. After some internal disagreement, the council decided to proceed with the project in August 1892 and the foundation stone for the new building was laid on 7 July 1895. It was designed by Léon Jamin in the Louis XIV style, built in ashlar stone and was officially opened by the Minister for Public Instruction, Alfred Nicolas Rambaud, on 27 March 1898.

The design involved a symmetrical main frontage of five bays facing onto Place de la République. The central section of three bays, which was slightly projected forward, featured three segmental headed openings with voussoirs and keystones on the ground floor. There were three tall casement windows on the first floor. The windows were flanked by Ionic order columns supporting a frieze, a modillioned cornice and a parapet. The outer bays were fenestrated by segmental headed windows on the ground floor, by casement windows with triangular pediments of the first floor, and by oculi at attic level. Above the central bay, there was a clock with an ornate surround incorporating statues of Neptune, Ceres and Hercules, and behind the clock, there was an octagonal lantern. The building was 51 metres (167 ft) high, and the sculptures were created by Sieur Raynaud.

Internally, the principal rooms were the Bureau du Maire (mayor's office) on the ground floor, and the Salle des Fêtes (ballroom), which was 44 metres (144 ft) long and 12 metres (39 ft) wide, on the first floor, and the Salle de Conseil (council chamber) also on the first floor. These rooms were richly decorated to a design by Marcel Jambon and were accessed by a grand sweeping staircase.

Following the liberation of the town by the French 2nd Armoured Division, commanded by General Philippe Leclerc, on 26 August 1944 during the Second World War, a group from the French Forces of the Interior seized the town hall. The building was badly damaged by a fire in November 1985 but subsequently restored to a design by Philippe Bigot between June 1986 and December 1987.
