= Porte de Champerret station =

Metro station in Paris, France

Porte de Champerret
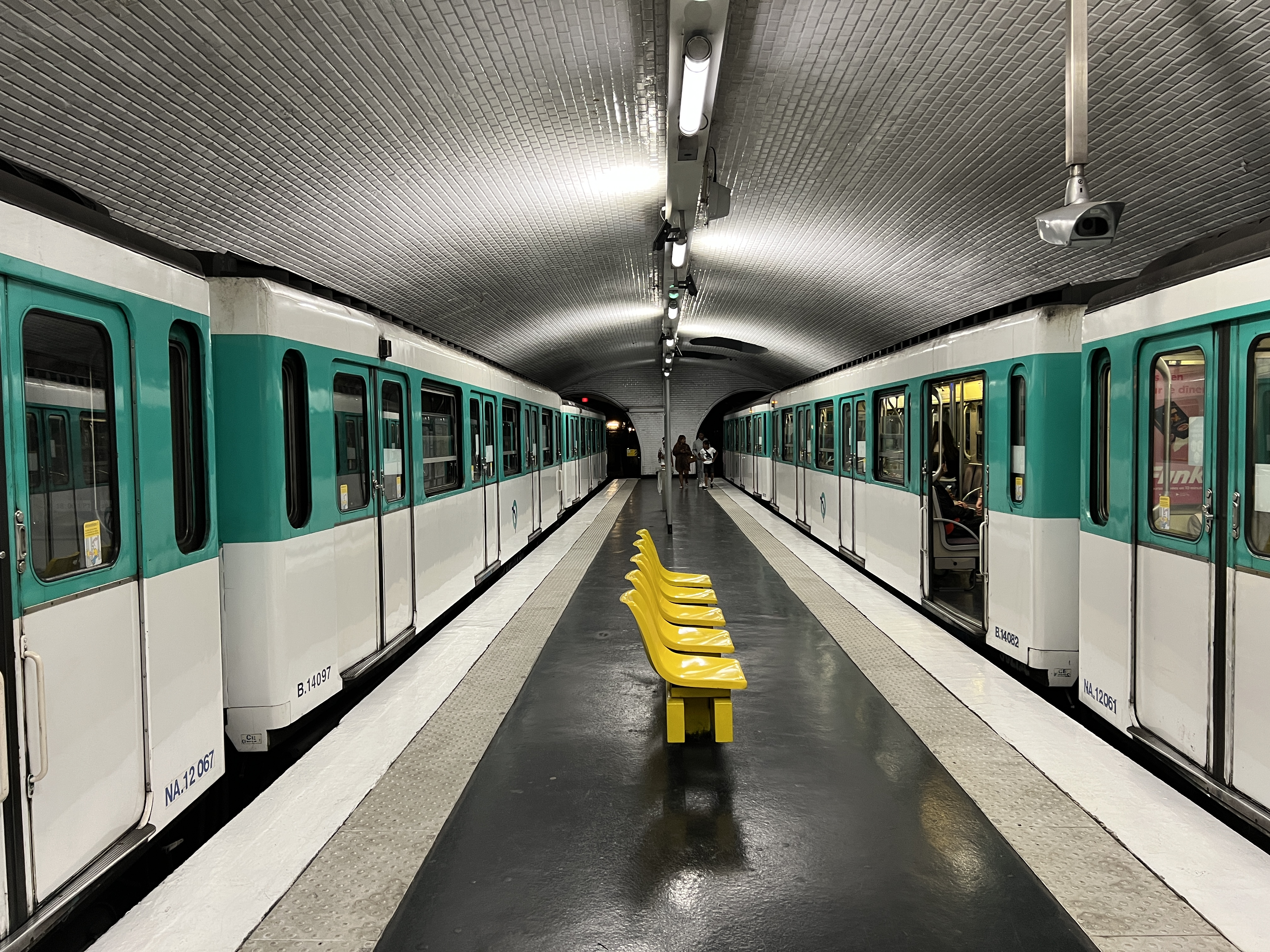

General information
- Location: 143, rue de Villiers; Place Stuart Merrill; 149, boul. Berthier; 17th arrondissement of Paris; Île-de-France; France
- Coordinates: 48°53′09″N 2°17′37″E
- Owner: RATP
- Operator: RATP
- Line: Paris Metro Paris Metro Line 3
- Platforms: 2
- Tracks: 4

Construction
- Accessible: no

Other information
- Fare zone: 1

History
- Opened: 15 February 1911

Services
Preceding station	Paris Metro	Following station
Louise Michel towards Pont de Levallois–Bécon	Line 3	Pereire towards Gallieni
Location
- Location within Paris

Porte de Champerret (French pronunciation: [pɔʁt də ʃɑ̃pɛʁɛ]; lit. 'Gate of Champerret') is a station on Line 3 of the Paris Métro in the 17th arrondissement.

== Location ==
The station is located under Boulevard Berthier between the Rue de Courcelles and Avenue de Villiers. Oriented along a northeast–southwest axis, it is situated between the Louise Michel and Pereire stations and is extended by an old terminal loop.

== History ==
The station is named after the Porte de Champerret, a gate in the now-former 19th-century Thiers wall of Paris on the way to the hamlet of Champerret, which was integrated into the new commune of Levallois-Perret in 1867.

The station was opened on 15 February 1911, when the line was extended from Pereire and was the western terminus of the line until its extension to Pont de Levallois–Bécon on 24 September 1937. It then became a transit station with the commissioning of the extension to the current terminus at Pont de Levallois–Bécon. The turning loop, under which the new tunnel passes, is now used as a depot.

As part of the RATP's Renouveau du métro programme, the station's corridors were renovated on 21 September 2002. In 2018, 3,431,010 travelers entered this station, which placed it at the 158th position of the metro stations for its frequency.

== Passenger services ==
=== Access ===
The station has three entrances divided into four metro outlets, each embellished with a Dervaux type balustrade:

- access 1 - "Place Stuart-Merrill" comprising two fixed staircases indicated by the same mast with a yellow "M" inscribed in a circle, emerging at the eastern corner of this place near the Square Jérôme-Bellat;
- access 2 "Avenue Stéphane-Mallarmé - Espace Champerret", consisting of a fixed staircase lined and an ascending escalator, located in the heart of Place Stuart-Merrill, occupied by a dedicated bus station;
- access 3 - "Avenue de Villiers", consisting of a fixed staircase decorated with a Dervaux candelabra, located at the right of no. 141 of this avenue.

=== Station layout ===
Street Level

B1	Mezzanine

Line 3 platforms	Loop track	No regular service
Line 3 platforms	Island platform, doors will open on the right
Line 3 platforms	Westbound	← toward Pont de Levallois – Bécon (Louise Michel)
Line 3 platforms	Eastbound	toward Gallieni (Pereire) →
Line 3 platforms	Island platform, doors will open on the right
Line 3 platforms	Loop track	No regular service

=== Platforms ===
Porte de Champerret is a station with a particular configuration. Because of its status as a former terminus, it has four tracks, distributed in two identical half-stations (one per direction) with two tracks framing an island platform under an elliptical vault, layout which it shares with Château de Vincennes on Line 1 and Porte de la Villette on Line 7. The tracks framing the axial pedestal are used by ordinary traffic on the line, the other two being dedicated to a depot for trains and giving access only to the old terminal loop westbound.

The decoration is classic with bevelled white ceramic tiles covering the walls, the vault, and the tunnel exits, while the lighting is provided by tubes and spotlights. The advertising frames are metallic and the name of the station is inscribed on enamelled plates, in capital letters on the side walls and in Parisine font on the platforms as well as the central wall. The seats are yellow motte style.

=== Bus connections ===
The bus station near the station is the terminus of several bus lines. The station is served by lines 84, 92, 93, PC, 163, 164 and 165 of the RATP Bus Network and, at night, by lines N16 and N52 of Noctilien bus service.

== Nearby ==
- Espace Champerret
- Square Jérôme-Bellat
- Église Sainte-Odile
- Square Sainte-Odile

== Gallery ==
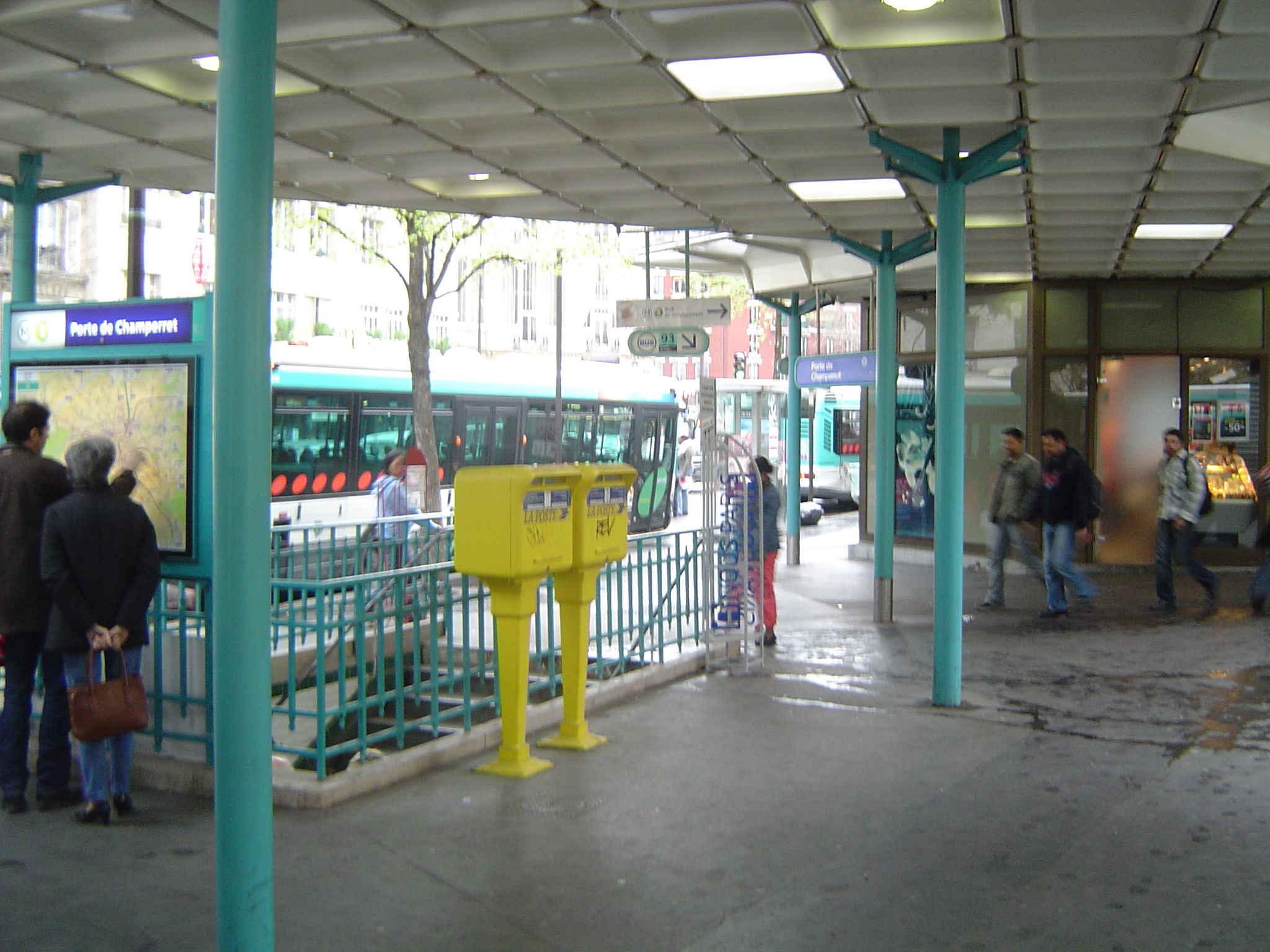
Street-level entrance at Porte de Champerret

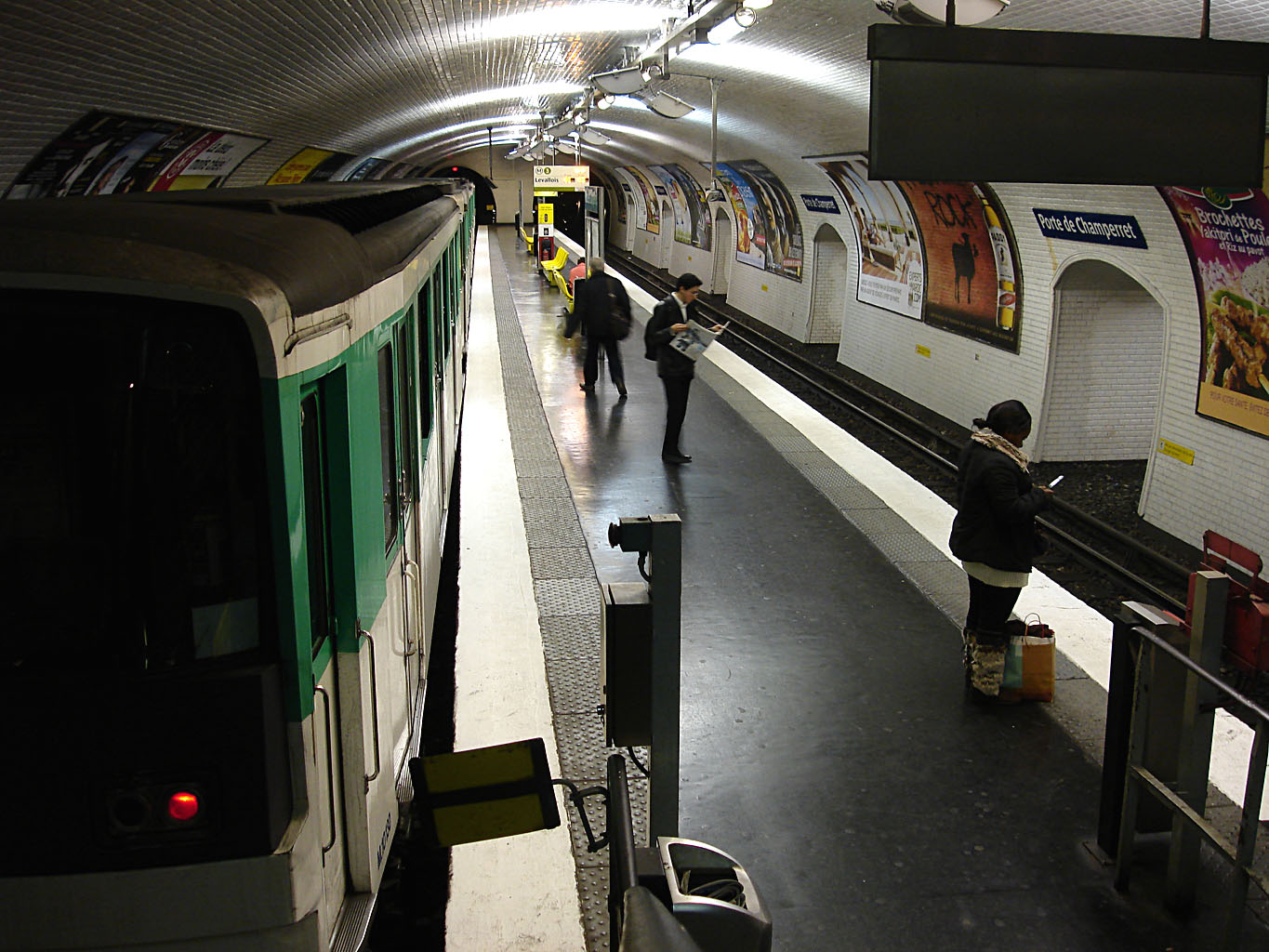
MF 67 at Porte de Champerret
