= Thieffrans =

- Commune
- Location of Thieffrans
- Location within France Location within Bourgogne-Franche-Comté
- Coordinates: 47°30′05″N 6°19′02″E
- Country: France
- Region: Bourgogne-Franche-Comté
- Department: Haute-Saône
- Arrondissement: Vesoul
- Canton: Rioz
- Area^{1}: 9.36 km^{2} (3.61 sq mi)
- Highest elevation: 353 m (1,158 ft)
- Lowest elevation: 247 m (810 ft)
- Population (2023): 170
  - Density: 18/km^{2} (47/sq mi)
- Time zone: UTC+01:00 (CET)
  - Summer (DST): UTC+02:00 (CEST)
- INSEE/Postal code: 70500 /70230
- ^{1} French Land Register data, which excludes lakes, ponds, glaciers > 1 km^{2} (0.386 sq mi or 247 acres) and river estuaries.

Thieffrans is a commune in the Haute-Saône department in the region of Bourgogne-Franche-Comté in eastern France.

== See also ==
- Communes of the Haute-Saône department
