= Speed Rabbit Pizza =

Pizza chain in France

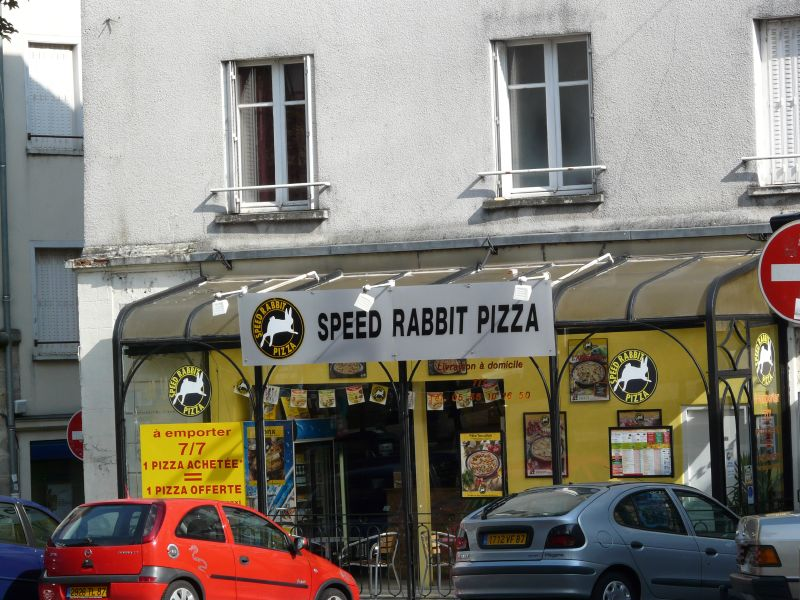
Speed Rabbit Pizza restaurant in Limoges, France (2009)

Speed Rabbit Pizza S.A. is a pizza restaurant chain in France, with its headquarters in Lille, Nord in the Hauts-de-France region. The company was listed on the Marché Libre of the Paris Stock Exchange in 1996. Daniel Sommer has been the executive CEO since 1999. As of December 2012 the executive director was Marie-Agnès Sommet.

It has 130 outlets as of December 2012. As of December 2011 the chain had 120 locations, of which 66 are located in Île-de-France.
