= Lycée Léonard de Vinci (Levallois-Perret) =

School in Levallois-Perret, Hauts-de-Seine, France

Coordinates: 48.8973°N 2.2786°E

Lycée Léonard de Vinci is a senior high school in Levallois-Perret, Hauts-de-Seine, France, in the Paris metropolitan area.

The high school is located at the terminus of Paris Metro Line 3, the Pont de Levallois–Bécon station.

As of 2016 it has 1,744 students.

== History ==
It was formed in 1990 by a merger with a technical high school and a professional high school. Its current building, then newly constructed, opened on November 22, 1993.

In April 2016 the campus experienced arson that destroyed the school's lobby. Damages were estimated to be €150,000. A student was convicted of causing the riot that resulted in the arson.

From September 28 to October 2, 2026, riots and blockades took place outside the high school; students demanded a reduction in their workload and better conditions, while also denouncing the ban on mobile phones and the lack of school nurses. The conflict turned violent starting on September 30, involving arrests and violent actions against the police. On October 2, high school students from across the Hauts-de-Seine came to support the blockade (1000 to 2000 according to information circulating on site). Starting October 5, 2026, the high school closed temporarily, and classes were conducted remotely for safety reasons.
