= Pont de Levallois–Bécon station =

Metro station in Paris, France

Pont de Levallois–Bécon
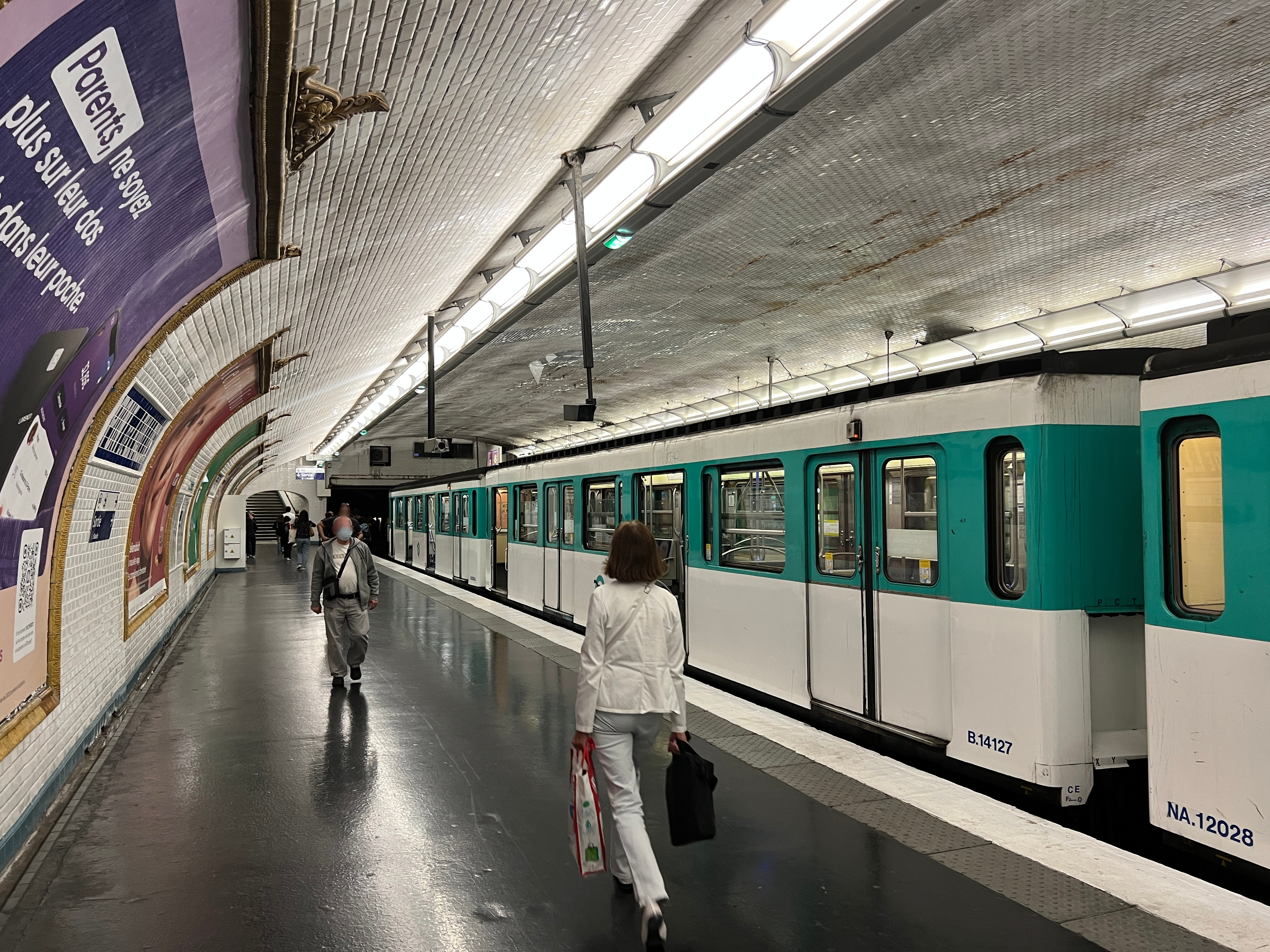

General information
- Location: Rue Anatole France (two); Rue Baudin at A. France (two); Levallois-Perret; Île-de-France; France
- Coordinates: 48°53′50″N 2°16′51″E
- Owner: RATP
- Operator: RATP

Other information
- Fare zone: 2

History
- Opened: 24 September 1937

Services
Preceding station	Paris Metro	Following station
Terminus	Line 3	Anatole France towards Gallieni
Location
- Location within Paris

Pont de Levallois–Bécon (French pronunciation: [pɔ̃ d(ə) ləvalwa bekɔ̃]) is the northwestern terminus of Line 3 of the Paris Métro, located in the commune of Levallois-Perret.

== Location ==
The station is located under Rue Anatole-France in Levallois-Perret, between Rue Baudin and Avenue Georges-Pompidou.

== History ==
It was opened on 24 September 1937 when the line was extended from Porte de Champerret.

The station is named after the bridge linking Levallois-Perret and Courbevoie across the Seine, as well as the neighbourhood of Bécon in Courbevoie, directly across the river. Both take their name from a property developer, Nicolas Eugène Levallois.

In 2018, 5,374,925 passengers entered this station, which places it in 78th position among the 302 metro stations for its usage.

== Passenger services ==
=== Access ===
The station has four entrances by fixed stairs and by escalators at the intersection of Rue Anatole-France and Avenue Georges-Pompidou.

=== Station layout ===
Street Level

B1	Mezzanine

Line 3 platforms	Side platform, doors will open on the right
Line 3 platforms	Westbound	← Alighting passengers only
Line 3 platforms	Eastbound	toward Gallieni (Anatole France) →
Line 3 platforms	Island platform, doors will open on the left, right
Line 3 platforms	Eastbound	toward Gallieni (Anatole France) →

=== Platforms ===
Pont de Levallois-Bécon has two platforms, one central and one side, serving three tracks: the central platform is served by the two tracks used for the departure of the trains while the side platform is served by the trains on arrival. The decoration is in the style used for most metro stations: the lighting canopies are white and rounded in the Gaudin style of the renouveau du métro of the 2000s, and the bevelled white ceramic tiles cover the walls, the vault, and the tunnel exits. The advertising frames are a honey colour faience and the name of the station is also faience. The seats are a Motte style white colour.

=== Bus connections ===
The station is served by lines 94, 167, 238 and 275 of the RATP Bus Network and at night, by lines N16 and N52 of the Noctilien bus network.

== Gallery ==
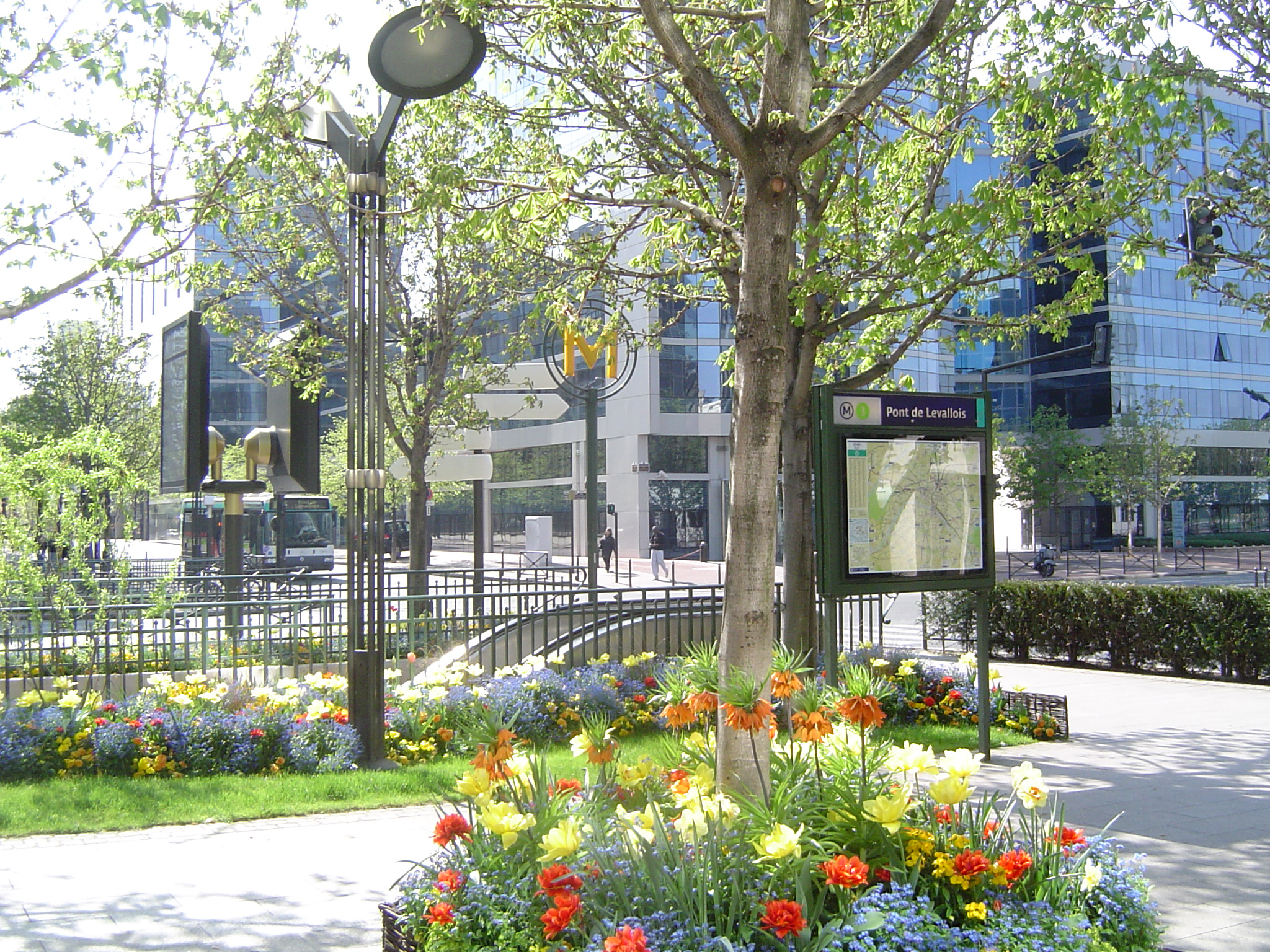
Street-level entrance at Pont de Levallois–Bécon

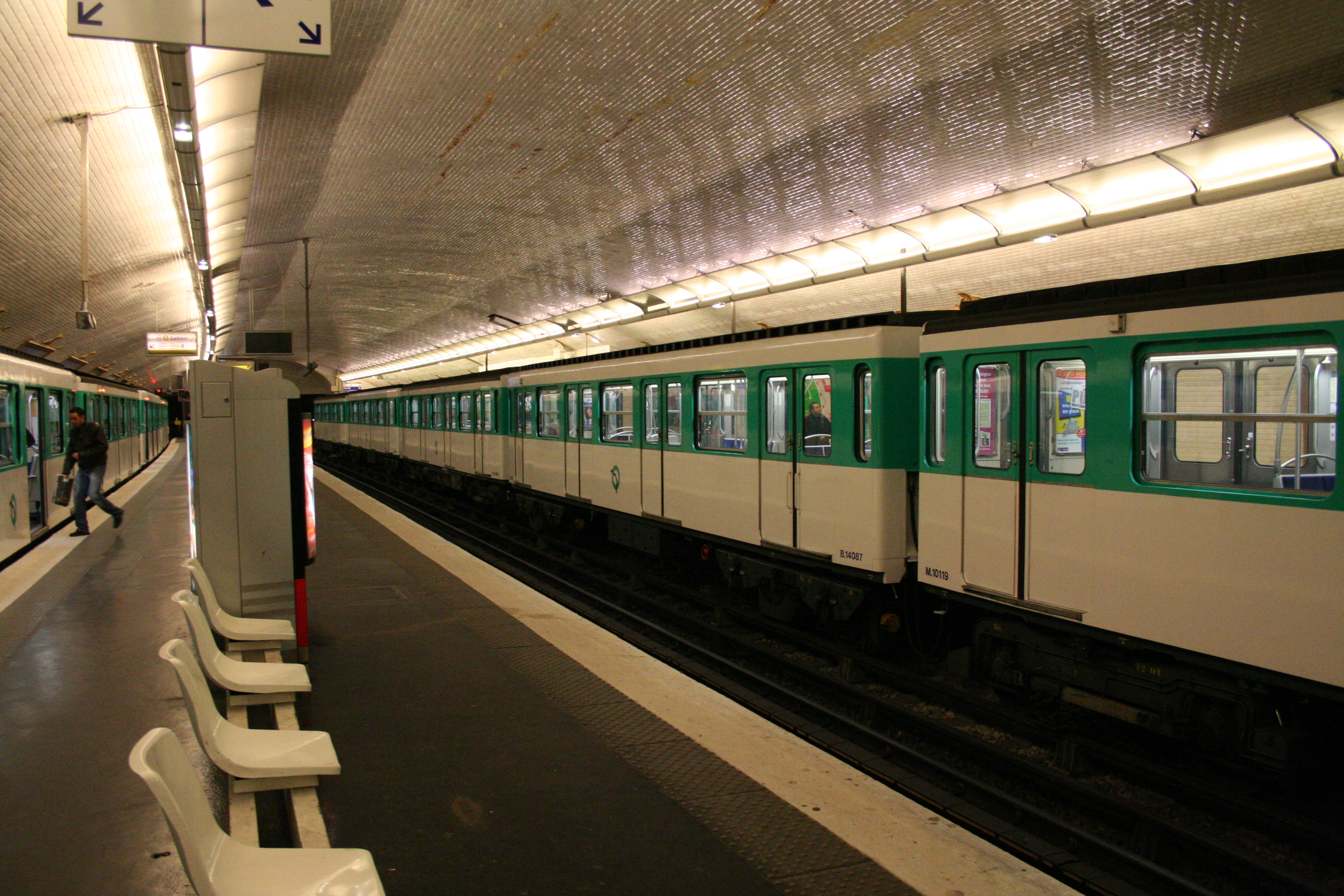
Line 3 platforms

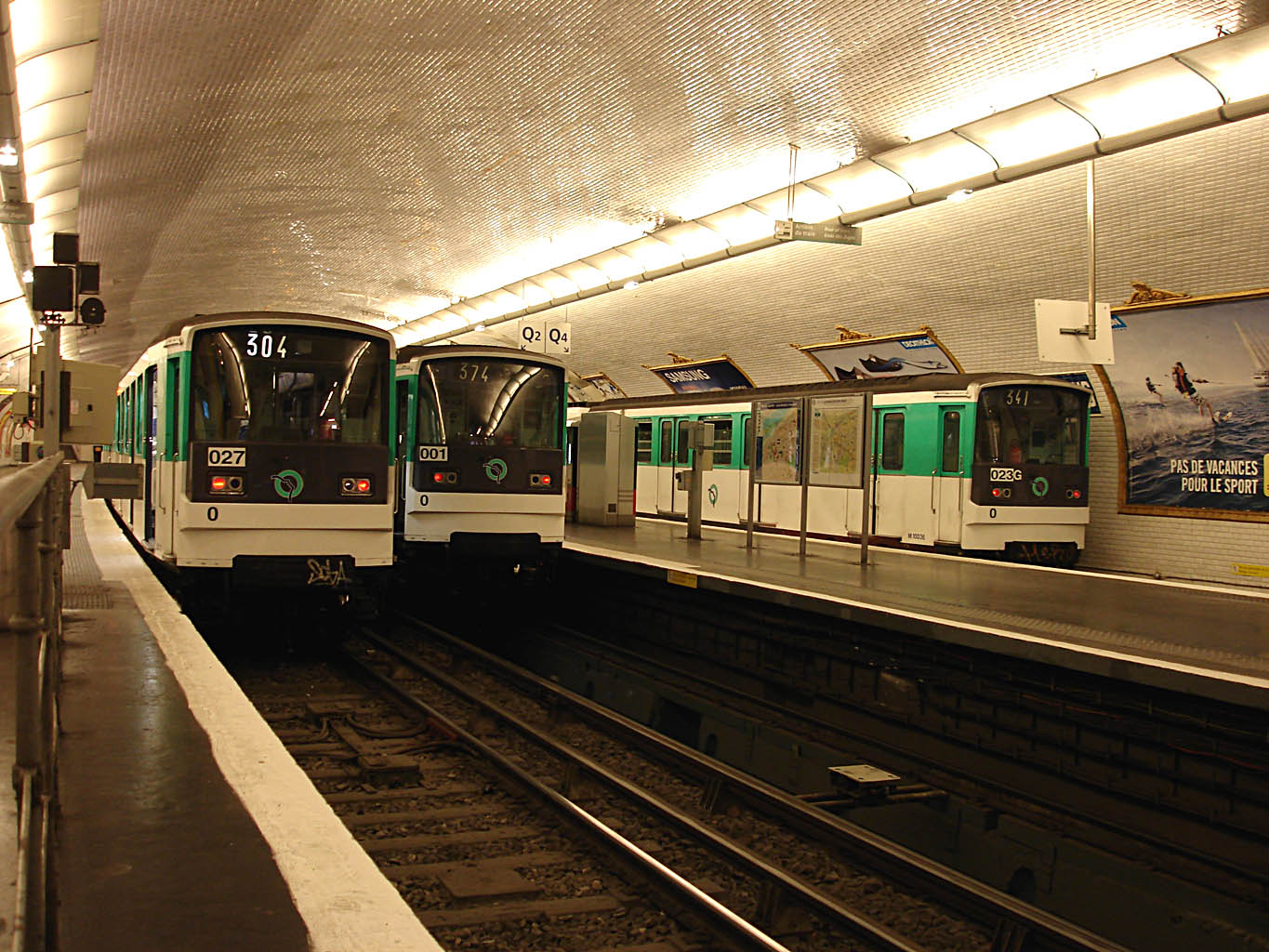
Line 3 platforms

MF 67 rolling stock at Pont de Levallois–Bécon
