= Jacques Vaillant =

Jacques Vaillant is a French singer and an interpreter of French-language pop songs, born on 8 June 1952 in Strasbourg (Alsace, France).

== Biography ==
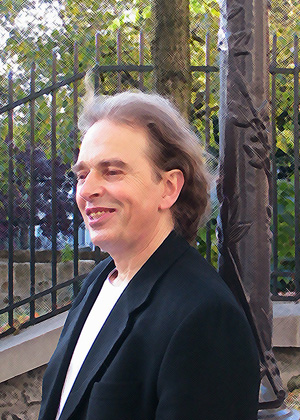
Portrait of Jacques Vaillant

When he was six years old he experienced an accident that left him blind. He would go on to join a choir while in a 'specialized institute' in Alsace.

In 1968, he was a contestant on the French radio Europe 1's show, "Les numéro 1 de demain", ("Numbers 1 of tomorrow"). In 1970, he met Charles Humel, a French blind pianist and composer, who had composed the song Les plaines du far-west for Yves Montand.

In 1975 he sang with a guitar in the Paris métro, in the Trocadéro, République, Montparnasse stations. The year 1980 marked the release of Jacques Vaillant's second 45 rpm record Pourquoi piétiner les fleurs, the starting point of his career: ten thousand copies sold within a few months only. During the 1980s, the title Slow pour Alvina was distributed in disc shops, with Carrère publishing. Broadcast on major French radios (such as Europe 1, NRJ, Radio Monte Carlo, Radio 7, Sud Radio), this title was a first-place hit for days in Belgium, Switzerland, Benelux and in French DOM-TOM territories.

Finally, on account of lack of commercial success, he went back to the Métro. In these underground corridors, he would sell 40,000 copies of his first vinyl album Correspondances, produced in 1983. Henceforth, he wrote poems and song texts, finding his inspiration in everyday life. After more twenty years of silence, Jacques Vaillant produced his latest CD, Paris Nostalgie.

== Discography ==
- 1980 : Pourquoi piétiner les fleurs (RCA Victor; 45 rpm record)
- 1981 : Slow pour Alvina (Force Records / Carrère; 45 rpm record)
- 1981 : Comme un pantin désuni (Force Records / Carrère; single)
- 1982 : Le chanteur des rues (RCA Victor; 45 rpm record)
- 1983 : First album Correspondances
- 1986 : Petite Nana Blues (Polydor; single)
- 1986 : Second album Plein Soleil
- 2007 : Third album Paris Nostalgie
