= Canal Saint-Martin =

Canal in Paris

- Plan of the Canal Saint-Martin
- Interactive map of Canal Saint-Martin

Specifications
- Length: 4.6 kilometres (2.9 mi)
- Maximum boat length: 40.70 m (133.5 ft)
- Maximum boat beam: 7.70 m (25.3 ft)
- Locks: 9

History
- Current owner: Ville de Paris
- Date approved: 1802
- Date completed: 1825

Geography
- Start point: Paris Place de Stalingrad (Bassin de la Villette, Canal de l'Ourcq)
- End point: Paris Quai de la Râpée (entrance lock from Seine)
- Beginning coordinates: 48.8923°N 2.3862°E
- Ending coordinates: 48.8468°N 2.3657°E
- Connects to: Canal de l'Ourcq and River Seine

The Canal Saint-Martin (French pronunciation: [kanal sɛ̃ maʁtɛ̃]) is a 4.6 km (2.86 mi) long canal in Paris, connecting the Canal de l'Ourcq to the river Seine. Nearly half its length (2,069 metres (2,263 yd)), between the Rue du Faubourg du Temple and the Place de la Bastille, was covered in the mid-19th century to create wide boulevards and public spaces on the surface. The canal is drained and cleaned every 10–15 years, and it is always a source of fascination for Parisians to discover curiosities and even some treasures among the hundreds of tons of discarded objects.

== History ==
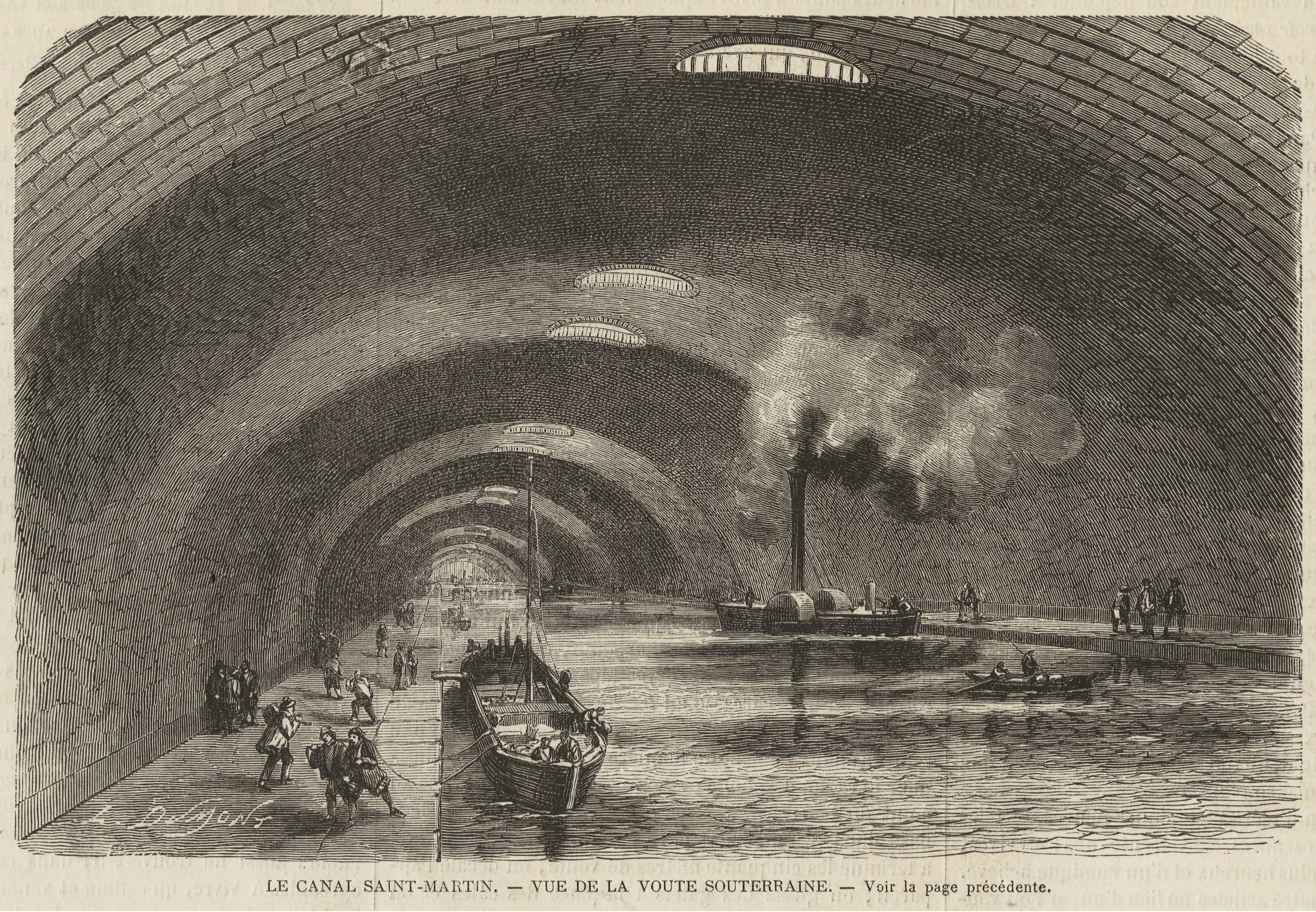
The underground Canal Saint-Martin in 1862

Gaspard de Chabrol, prefect of Paris, proposed building a canal from the river Ourcq, 100 km northeast of Paris, to supply the city with fresh water to support a growing population and help avoid diseases such as dysentery and cholera, while also supplying fountains (including the monumental Elephant of the Bastille) and allowing the streets to be cleaned. Construction of the canal was ordered by Napoleon I in 1802 and construction took place until 1825, funded by a new tax on wine.

The canal was also used to supply Paris with grain, building materials and other goods, carried on canal boats. Two ports were created on the canal in Paris to unload the boats: Port de l'Arsenal and the Bassin de la Villette.

By the 1960s, traffic had dwindled to a trickle and the canal narrowly escaped being filled in and paved over for a highway.

It was opened to swimmers as a public health measure during the historic climate change-driven 2026 European heatwaves. One man was found unresponsive in an unsupervised area.

== Route ==
The entrance to the canal from the terminal basin (Bassin de la Villette) of the Canal de l'Ourcq is at a double lock near the Place de Stalingrad. Continuing towards the river Seine, the canal is bordered by the Quai de Valmy on the right bank and the Quai de Jemmapes on the left, passing through three more double staircase locks before disappearing under the three successive tunnels—Temple, Richard-Lenoir and Bastille—to emerge in the Port de l'Arsenal, the principal port for boats visiting and residing in Paris.

== Métro stations ==
The canal can be accessed from the following Paris Métro stations: Stalingrad, République, Goncourt, Jacques Bonsergent, Jaurès.

== In popular culture ==
Art

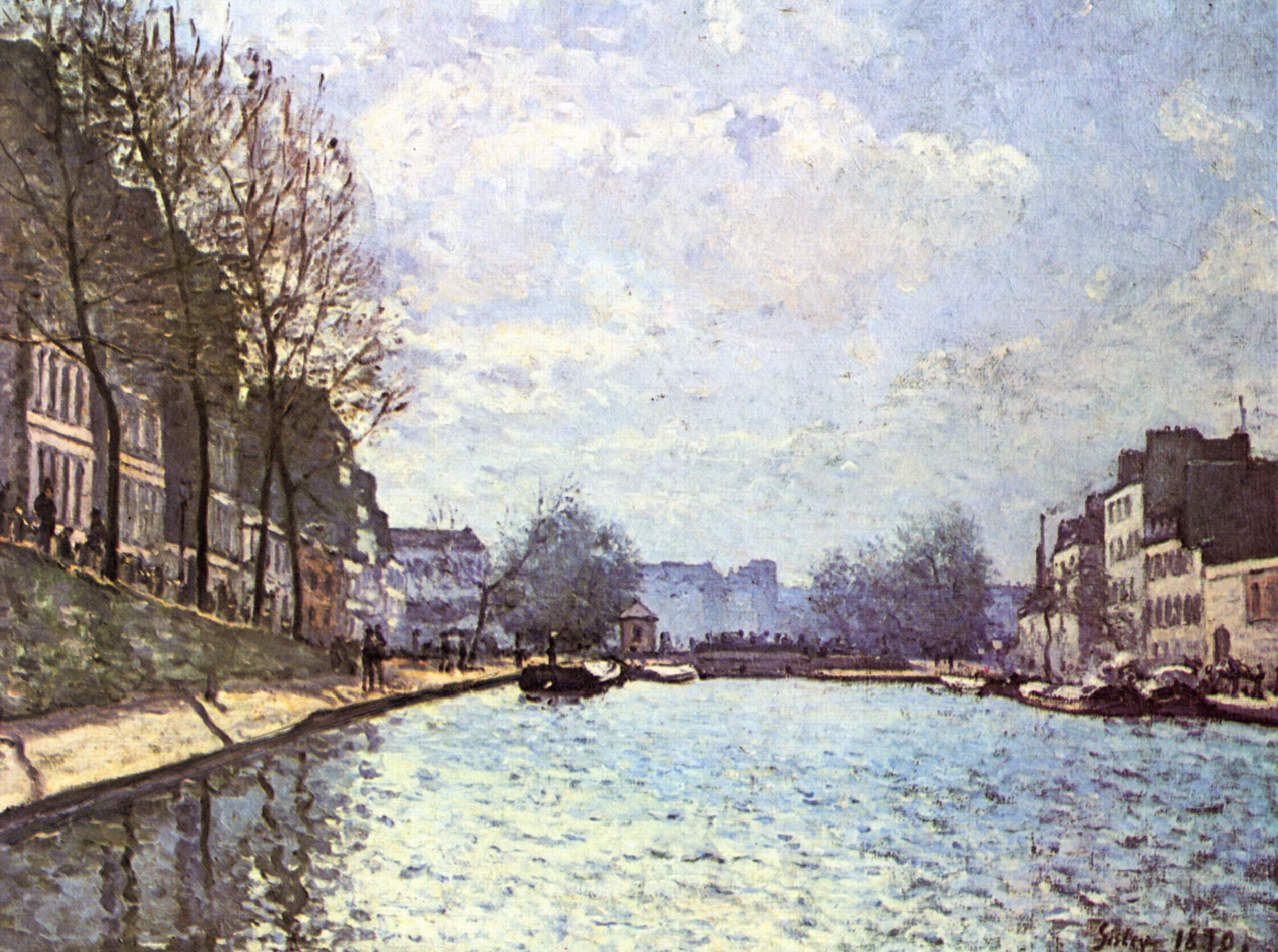
View of the Canal Saint-Martin (Alfred Sisley, Orsay Museum, 1870)

The canal inspired painters such as Alfred Sisley (1839-1899). In the present day, many intricate works of graffiti are visible along the canal, and there is a large multimedia art space on its banks at the former municipal undertakers building at 104 rue d'Aubervilliers ('104').

Film and television

- The canal was the setting in part for Jean Vigo's film L'Atalante in 1934.
- The canal is shown in the 1938 film Hôtel du Nord, directed by Marcel Carné.
- In Les Malheurs d'Alfred (1972), Pierre Richard and Anny Duperey meet each other at the beginning of the film, thinking of committing suicide in the canal.
- The French police series PJ uses an external shot of a building at 52 rue Bichat, located next to the canal, as the frontage of the police station. Cars were often shown exiting the building and the canal and adjacent neighbourhood were used as backdrops for scenes.
- The canal appears in Jean-Pierre Jeunet's famous 2001 film known in English as Amélie, in which the title character is shown enjoying one of her favourite activities: skipping stones at the locks of the canal.
- The canal was used as an escape route for Ethan Hunt and his team in the 2018 film Mission: Impossible – Fallout.
- The canal was used by John Wick as a route to get closer to Saint-Eustache in the 2023 film John Wick: Chapter 4.
- The canal was used in the 2024 film Under Paris.

Music

- Édith Piaf sings about the canal in the song "Les mômes de la cloche", written by Vincent Scotto and Decaye, music by Médinger, in 1936.
- Courteeners song "The Dilettante" mentions the canal and talks of the pleasant atmosphere surrounding it.

Literature

- Georges Simenon's novel Maigret and the Headless Corpse (Maigret et le corps sans tête) is set in and around the canal.

== Gallery ==
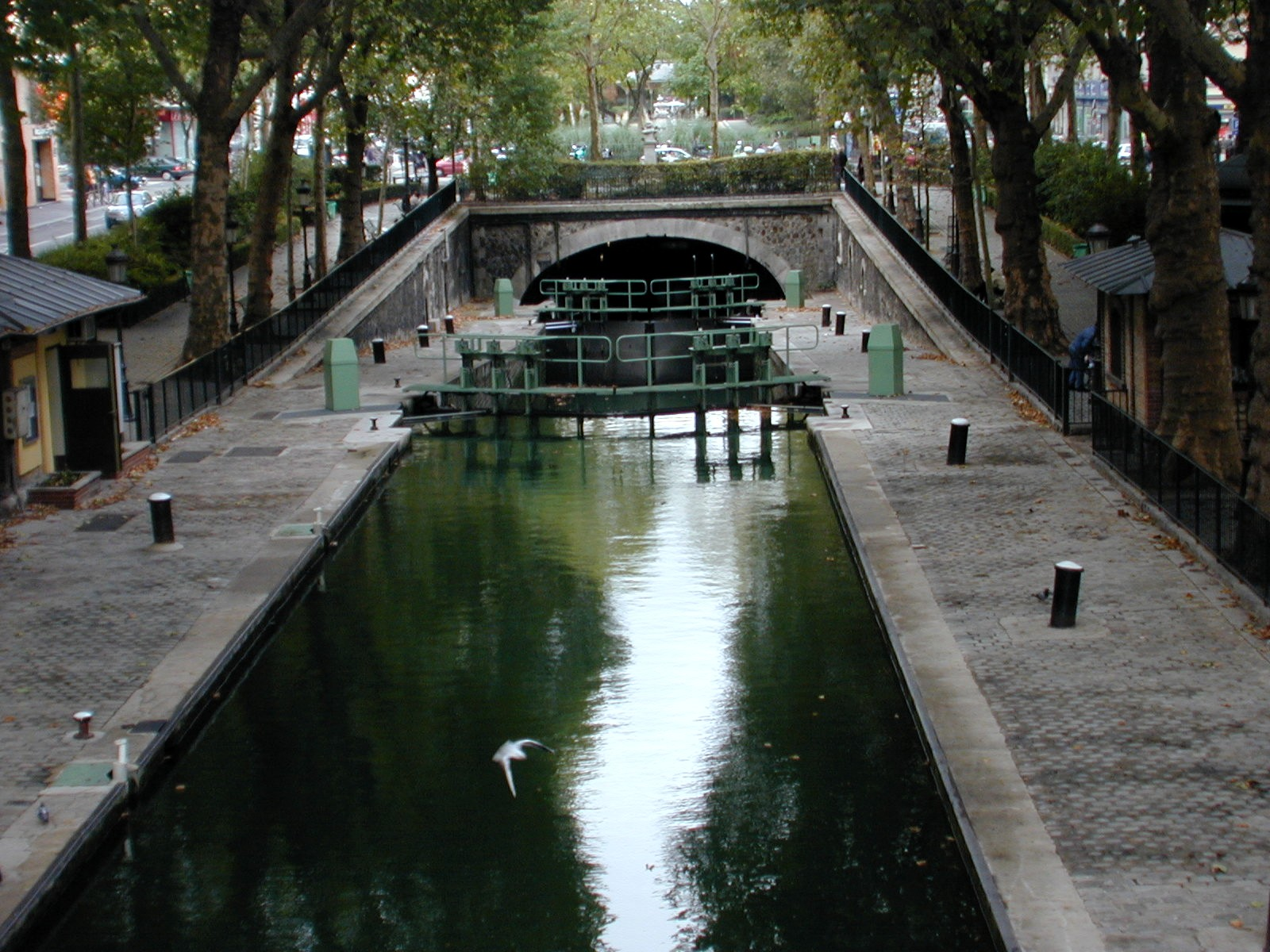
Canal St. Martin at Square Frédérick-Lemaître

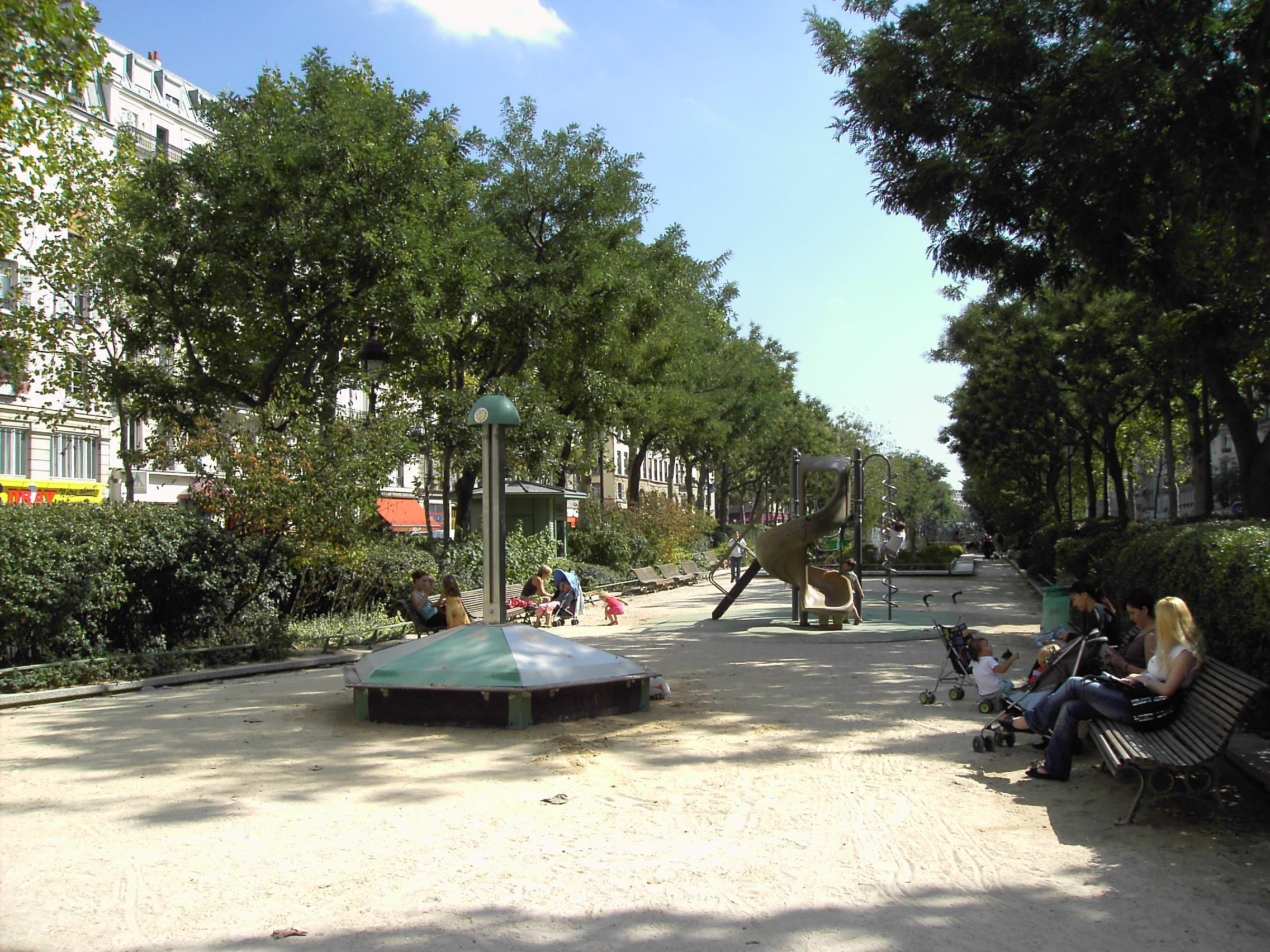
The Boulevard Jules-Ferry, which covers the lower end of the canal

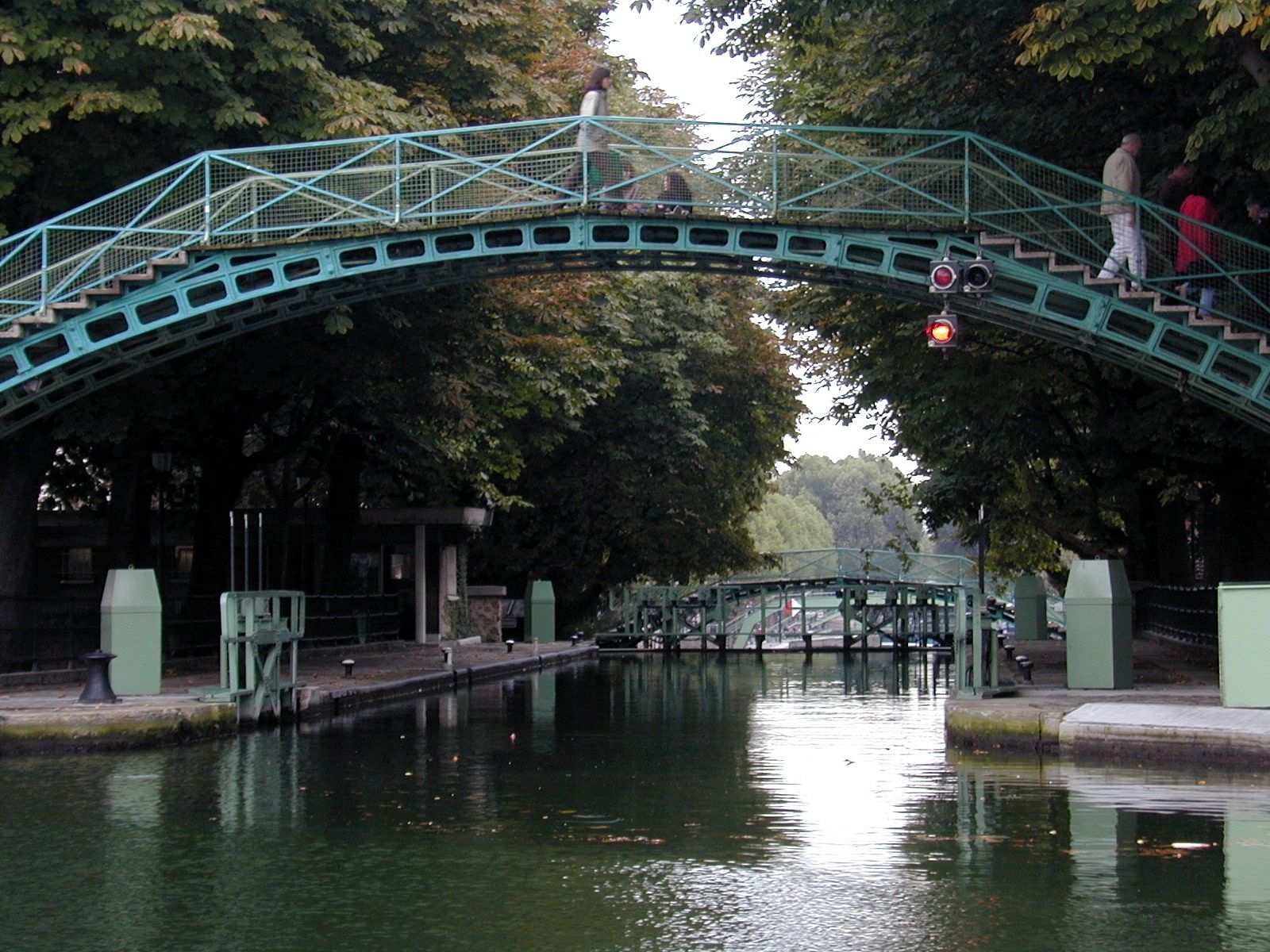
A typical iron bridge over the canal

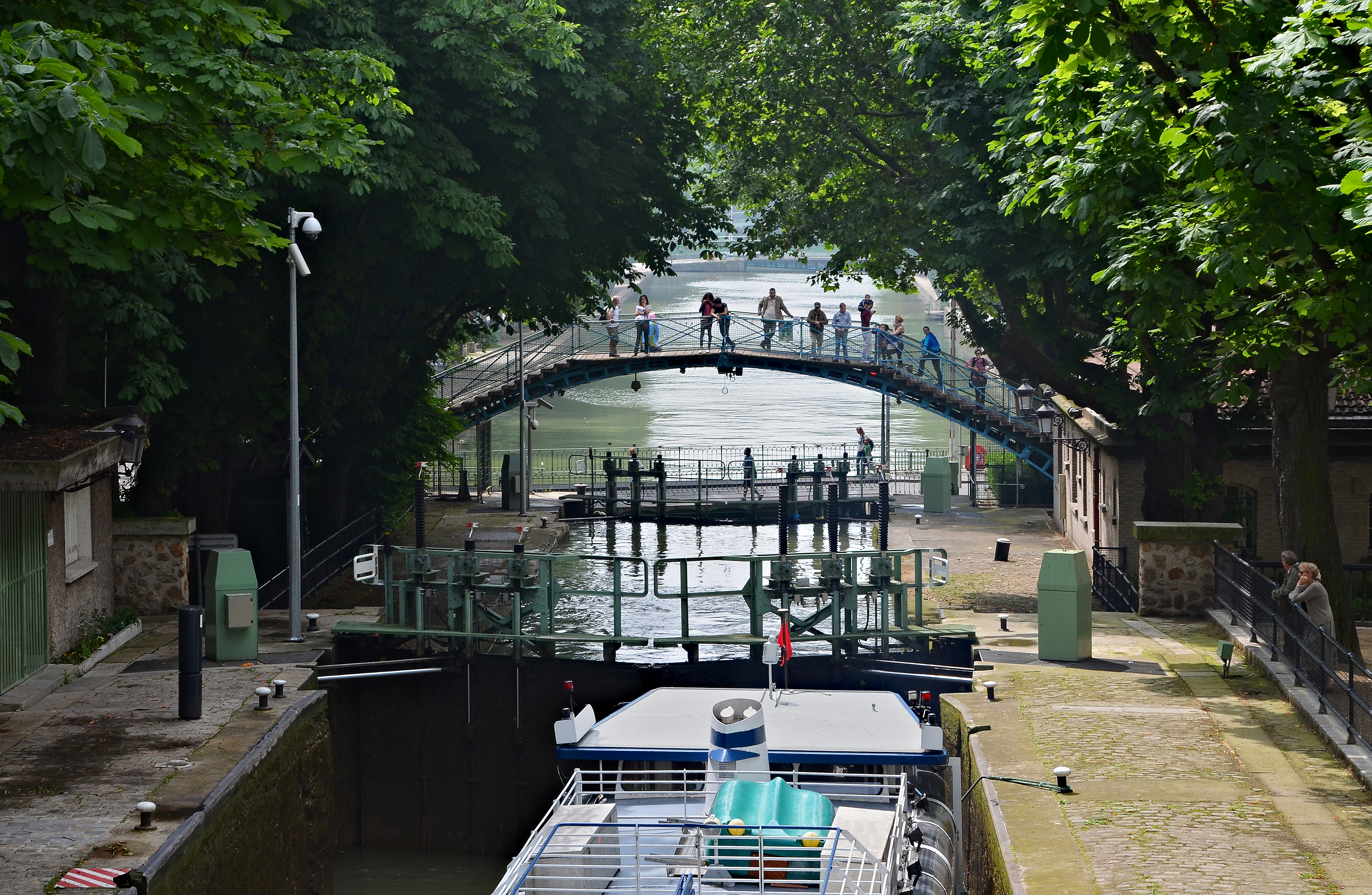
The locks of the Récollets
