= Goncourt station =

Metro station in Paris, France

Goncourt Hôpital Saint-Louis
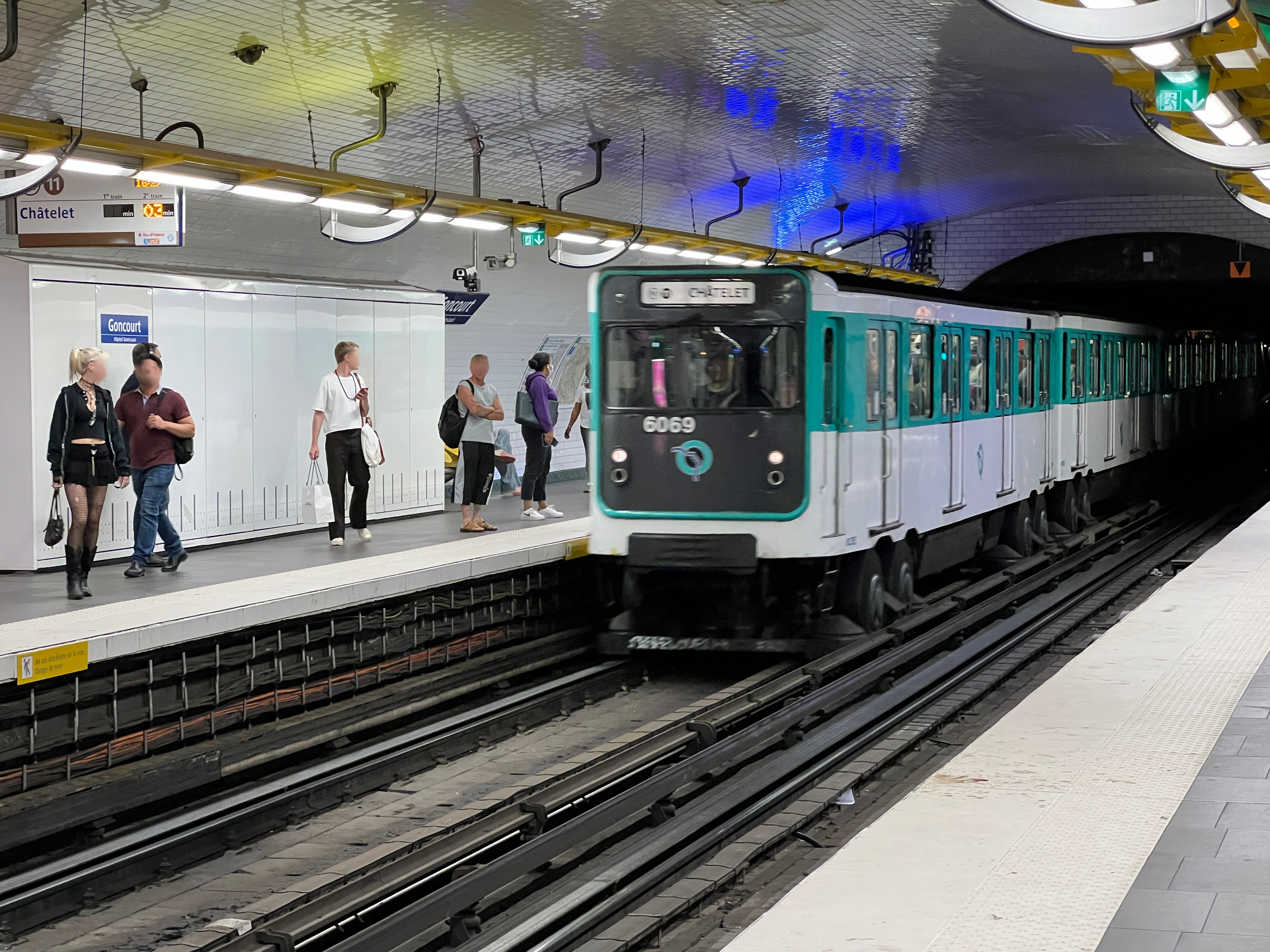
- MP 59 prior their replacement by manual MP 14 at Goncourt

General information
- Location: 10th arrondissement of Paris; Île-de-France; France
- Coordinates: 48°52′11″N 2°22′14″E
- System: Paris Métro station
- Owner: RATP
- Operator: RATP
- Line: Paris Metro Paris Metro Line 11
- Platforms: 2 (2 side platforms)
- Tracks: 2

Other information
- Station code: 08-05
- Fare zone: 1

History
- Opened: 28 April 1935

Passengers
- 1,829,817 (2020)

Services
Preceding station	Paris Metro	Following station
République towards Châtelet	Line 11	Belleville towards Rosny–Bois-Perrier
Location
- Location within Paris

Goncourt (French pronunciation: [ɡɔ̃kuʁ]) is a station on line 11 of the Paris Métro in the 10th and 11th arrondissements. It is named after the nearby rue des Goncourt, which was named after the writers Edmond de Goncourt (1822–1896) and his brother Jules de Goncourt (1830–1870). Edmond de Goncourt left funds to create the Académie Goncourt which awards the Prix Goncourt literary prize.

== History ==
The station opened as part of the original section of the line from Châtelet to Porte des Lilas on 28 April 1935.

As part of the "Un métro + beau" programme by the RATP, the station was renovated and modernised on 25 April 2003.

On 1 April 2017, half of the nameplates on the station's platforms were temporarily replaced by the RATP as part of April Fool's Day, along with 10 other stations by adorning the stations with original puns and illustrated pop culture references. It was humorously renamed "Nº1 au Goncourt de Beauté".

As part of modernization works for the extension of the line to Rosny–Bois-Perrier in 2023 for the Grand Paris Express, the station was closed from 9 January 2019 to 26 February 2019 to raise its platform levels and its surface tiled to accommodate the new rolling stock that will be used (MP 14) to accommodate the expected increase in passengers and to improve the station's accessibility. On 30 July 2021, 2 new entrances were opened at rue d'Aix and rue Bichat.

In 2019, the station was used by 2,192,190 passengers, making it the 234th busiest of the Métro network out of 302 stations.

In 2020, the station was used by 1,829,817 passengers amidst the COVID-19 pandemic, making it the 132nd busiest of the Métro network out of 305 stations.

== Passenger services ==
=== Access ===
The station has 6 entrances:

- Entrance 1: Hôpital Saint-Louis
- Entrance 2: rue du Faubourg-du-Temple
- Entrance 3: avenue Parmentier
- Entrance 4: rue des Goncourt
- Entrance 5: rue d'Aix
- Entrance 6: rue Bichat – Canal Saint-Martin

=== Station layout ===
Street Level
B1	Mezzanine
Line 11 platforms	Side platform, doors will open on the right
Line 11 platforms	Southbound	← toward Châtelet (République)
Line 11 platforms	Northbound	toward Rosny–Bois-Perrier (Belleville) →
Line 11 platforms	Side platform, doors will open on the right

=== Platforms ===
The station has a standard configuration with 2 tracks surrounded by 2 side platforms.

=== Other connections ===
The station is also served by lines 20, 46, and 75 of the RATP bus network, and at night, by lines N12 and N23 of the Noctilien bus network.

== Nearby ==
- Canal Saint-Martin
- Église Saint-Joseph-des-Nations
- Hôpital Saint-Louis
- Palais des glaces
- Square Jules-Verne

== Gallery ==
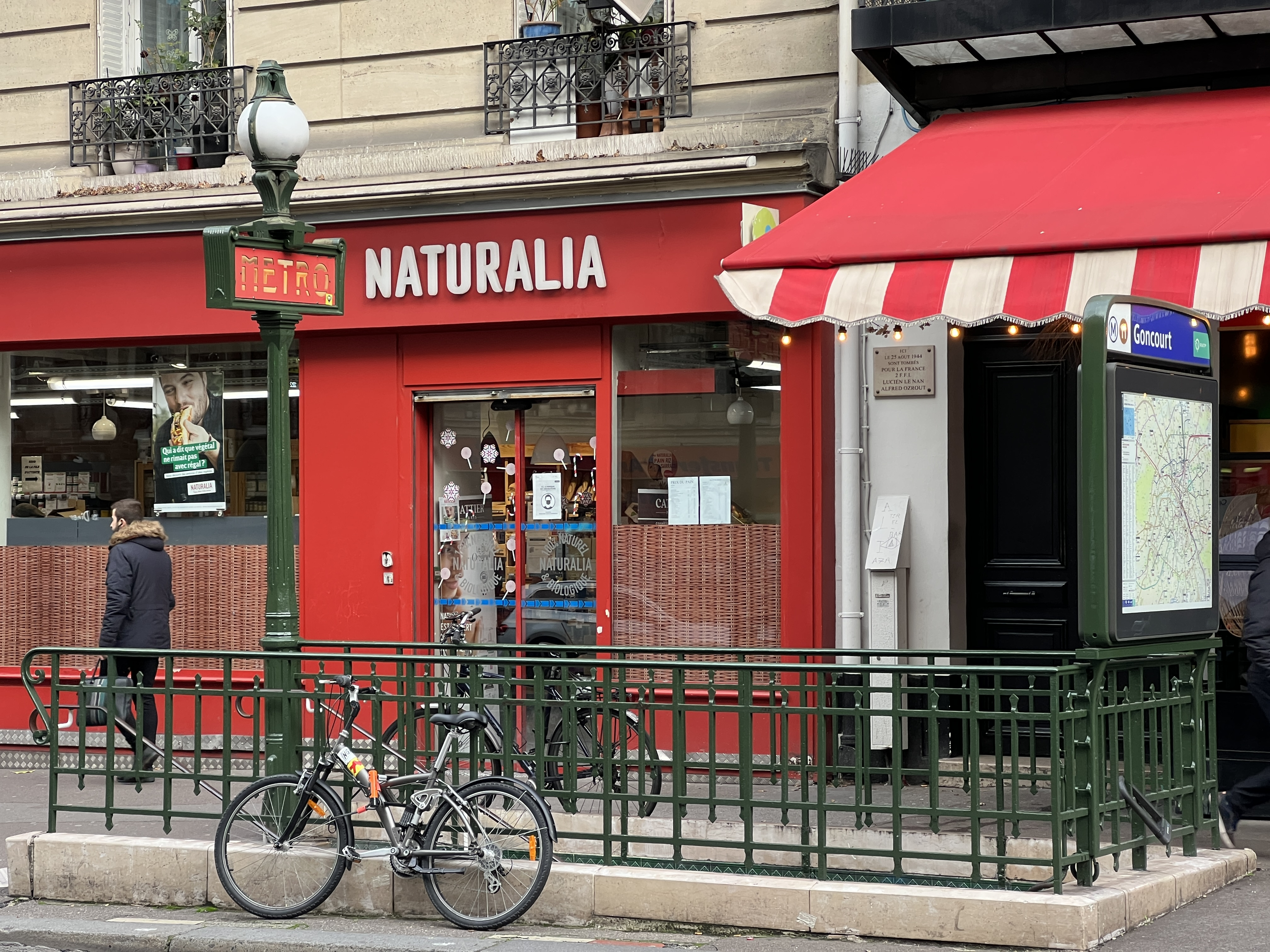
Entrance along avenue Parmentier
