= Colonel Fabien station =

Métro station in Paris, France

Colonel Fabien
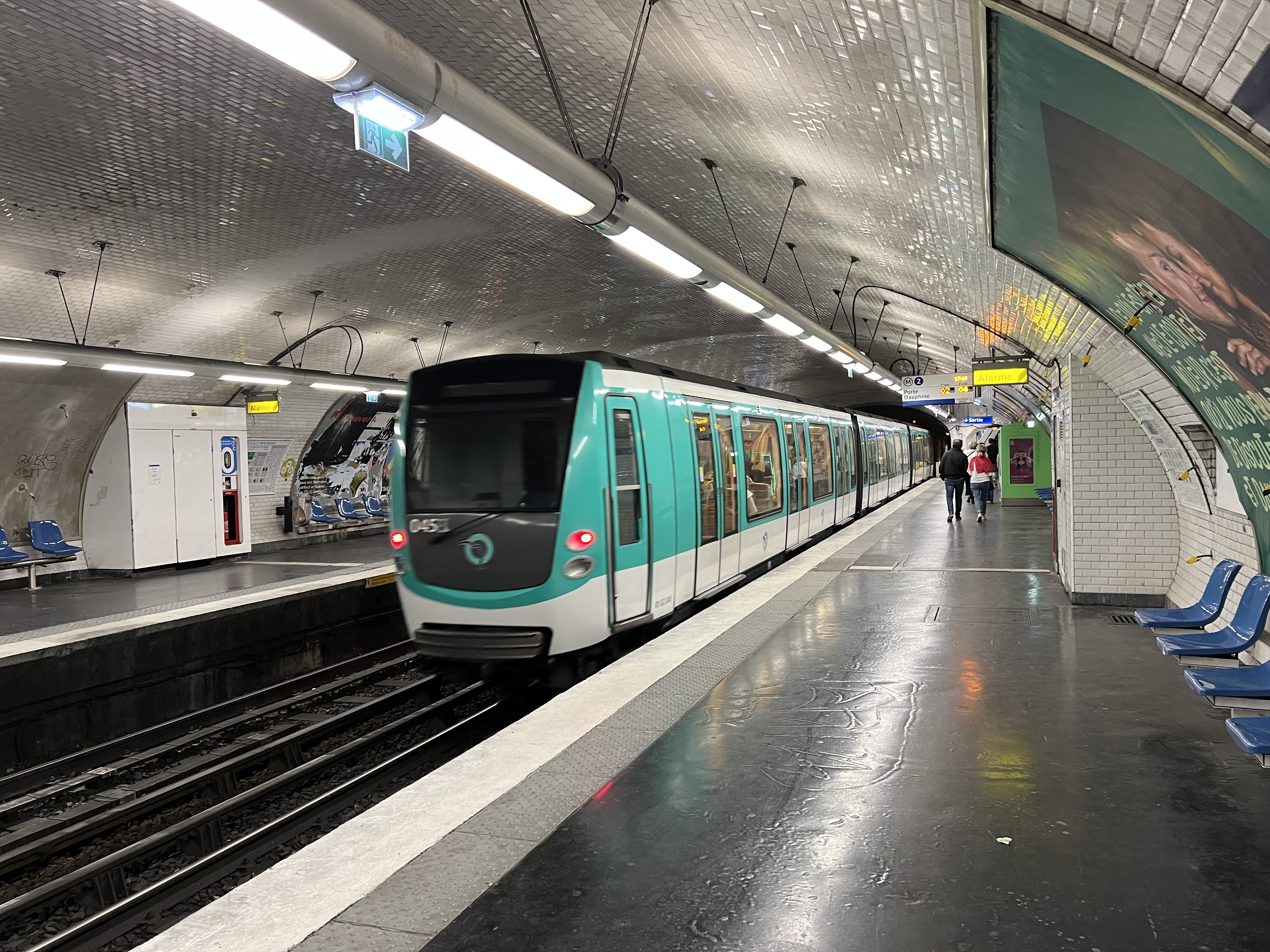

General information
- Location: 83, boul. de la Villette, 10th arrondissement of Paris; Île-de-France; France
- Coordinates: 48°52′38″N 2°22′16″E
- Owner: RATP
- Operator: RATP
- Line: Line 2
- Platforms: 2
- Tracks: 2
- Bus routes: : 46, 75
- Bus operators: RATP

Construction
- Structure type: Underground
- Accessible: No

Other information
- Station code: 2215
- Fare zone: 1

History
- Opened: 31 January 1903; 123 years ago
- Former names: Combat (1903–1945)

Passengers
- 2021: 3,043,606

Services
Preceding station	Paris Metro	Following station
Jaurès towards Porte Dauphine	Line 2	Belleville towards Nation
Location
- Location within Paris

Colonel Fabien (French pronunciation: [kɔlɔnɛl fabjɛ̃]) is a station on Paris Métro Line 2, on the border of the 10th and 19th arrondissements under the Boulevard de la Vilette.

== Location ==
The station is located under Boulevard de la Villette, to the southeast of Place du Colonel Fabien. Oriented approximately along a northwest/southeast axis, it is positioned between the Jaurès and Belleville metro stations. In the direction of Porte Dauphine, this is the last underground station before the above-ground section of the line.

== History ==
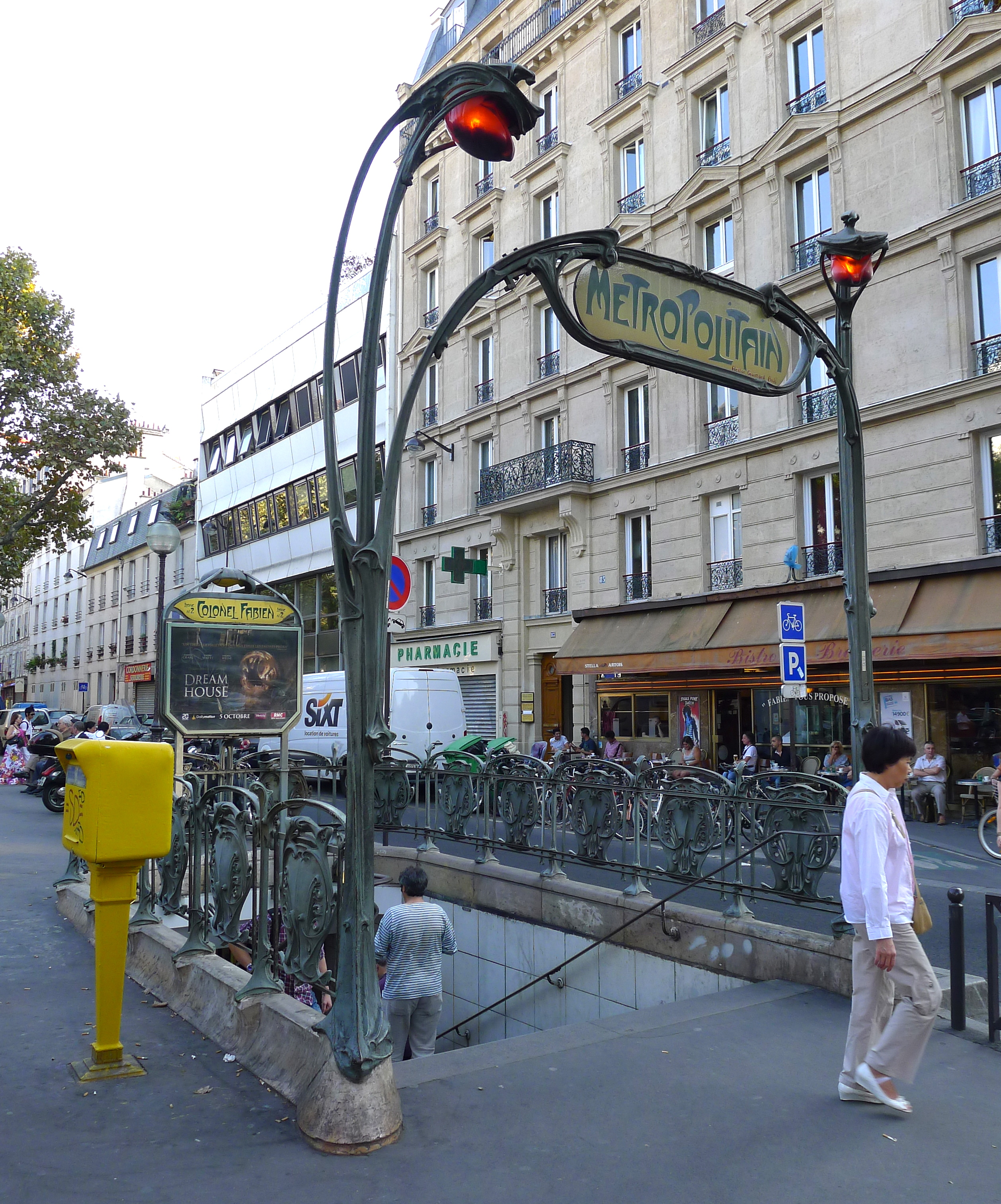
Entrance

The station was opened on 31 January 1903 as part of the extension of line 2 from Anvers to Bagnolet (now called Alexandre Dumas). It was originally named Combat after the Place du Combat, which was named after the Barrière du Combat, a gate built for the collection of taxation as part of the Wall of the Farmers-General; the gate was built between 1784 and 1788 and demolished after the Paris Commune of 1871. Its name reflected the animal fighting held there between 1778 and 1850. On 19 August 1945, the Place and station were renamed after Colonel Pierre-Georges Fabien, who shot a German soldier to death at Barbès – Rochechouart metro station, marking the beginning of the armed French Resistance in Paris.

As part of the RATP Renouveau du métro program, the station was renovated in the course of the 2000s.

In 2020, with the COVID-19 crisis, 2,378,863 passengers entered this station, which places it at the 94th position of metro stations for its use.

== Passenger services ==
=== Access ===
The station has a single entrance called Boulevard de la Villette, leading to the central median of this boulevard facing no. 83. Made up of a fixed staircase, it is adorned with a Guimard entrance designed in 1900 and is registered as a historical monument by the decree of 29 May 1978.

=== Station layout ===
G Street Level
M	Mezzanine for platform connection
P Platform level	Side platform, doors will open on the right
P Platform level	Platform 1	← toward Porte Dauphine (Jaurès)
P Platform level	Platform 2	toward Nation (Belleville) →
P Platform level	Side platform, doors will open on the right

=== Platform ===
Colonel Fabien is a standard configuration station. It has two platforms separated by the metro tracks and the vault is elliptical. The decoration is of the style used for the majority of the metro stations, with beveled white ceramic tiles covering the walls, the vault, the tunnel entrances, and the outlets of the corridors, while the lighting is provided by two tube canopies. The advertising frames are metallic, and the name of the station is written in Parisine font on enameled plates. The seats are the Motte style in blue.

=== Bus connections ===
The station is served by lines 46 and 75 of the RATP Bus Network.
