= Rambuteau station =

Metro station in Paris, France

Rambuteau Centre Georges Pompidou
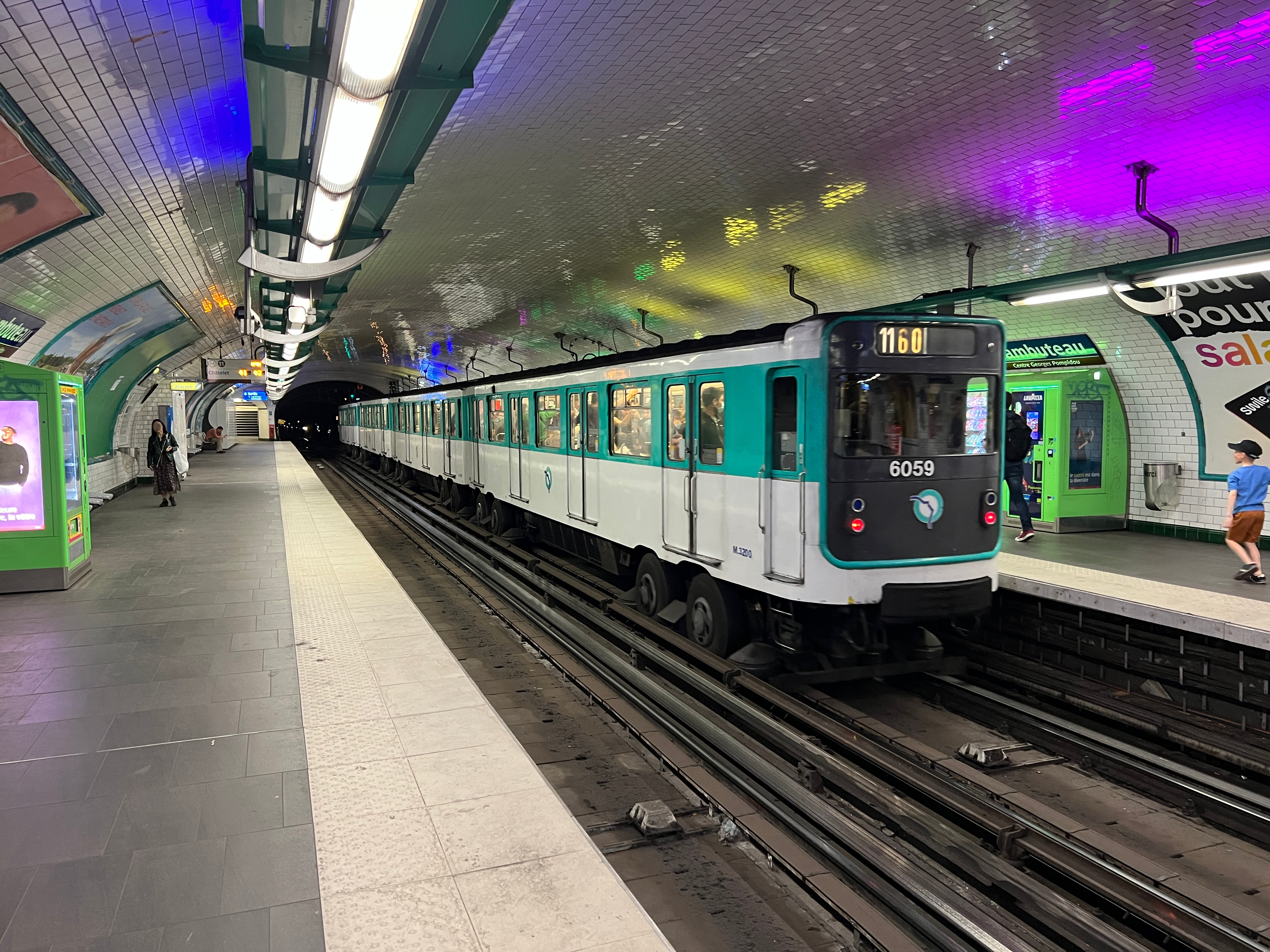
- MP 59 at Rambuteau

General information
- Location: 4th arrondissement of Paris; Île-de-France; France
- Coordinates: 48°51′40″N 2°21′12″E
- System: Paris Métro station
- Owner: RATP
- Operator: RATP
- Line: Paris Metro Paris Metro Line 11
- Platforms: 2 (side platforms)
- Tracks: 2

Other information
- Station code: 08-01
- Fare zone: 1

History
- Opened: 28 April 1935

Passengers
- 2020: 1,389,112

Services
Preceding station	Paris Metro	Following station
Hôtel de Ville towards Châtelet	Line 11	Arts et Métiers towards Rosny–Bois-Perrier
Location
- Location within Paris

Rambuteau (French pronunciation: [ʁɑ̃byto]) is a station on Line 11 of the Paris Métro in the 3rd and 4th arrondissements in central Paris. It is named after the nearby Rue Rambuteau, which was named after Claude-Philibert Barthelot, Comte de Rambuteau (1781–1869), a senior official in the former Department of the Seine, who established the groundwork for the fundamental transformation of Paris that Haussmann carried out under the Second Empire.

== History ==
The station opened as part of the original section of the line from Châtelet to Porte des Lilas on 28 April 1935.

As part of the "Un métro + beau" programme by the RATP, the station's corridors were renovated and modernised on 29 November 2002.

In 2017, a Berlin-based fashion label, Dumitrascu, held its SS18 presentation at the station as part of Paris Fashion Week to showcase its latest collection as a result of a last-minute change of plans instead of having it at the nearby Centre Georges-Pompidou as originally planned.

As part of modernization works for the extension of the line to Rosny–Bois-Perrier in 2023 for the Grand Paris Express, the station was closed from 5 March 2019 to 8 April 2019 to raise its platform levels and its surface tiled to accommodate the new rolling stock that will be used (MP 14) to accommodate the expected increase passengers and to improve the station's accessibility. It was also closed when the line was temporarily closed from Châtelet to Arts et Métiers from 21 August 2018 to 26 August 2019, 14 February 2020 to 19 February 2020, and again from 17 April 2021 to 2 May 2021 for modernisation works.

In 2019, the station was used by 3,219,510 passengers, making it the 155th busiest of the Métro network out of 302 stations.

In 2020, the station was used by 1,389,112 passengers amidst the COVID-19 pandemic, making it the 187th busiest of the Métro network out of 305 stations.

== Passenger services ==
=== Access ===
The station has 4 entrances:

- Centre Georges-Pompidou
- rue Rambuteau
- rue Geoffroy l'Angevin
- rue du Grenier-Saint-Lazare

=== Station layout ===
Street Level
B1	Mezzanine
Line 11 platforms	Side platform, doors will open on the right
Line 11 platforms	Southbound	← toward Châtelet (Hôtel de Ville)
Line 11 platforms	Northbound	toward Rosny–Bois-Perrier (Arts et Métiers) →
Line 11 platforms	Side platform, doors will open on the right

=== Platforms ===
The station has a standard configuration with 2 tracks surrounded by 2 side platforms.

=== Other connections ===
The station is also served by lines 29, 38, and 75 of the RATP bus network, and at night, by lines N12, N13, N14, and N23 of the Noctilien bus network.

== Nearby ==
- Centre Georges Pompidou
- Jardin Anne-Frank
- Musée d'Art et d'Histoire du Judaïsme
- Musée National d'Art Moderne
- Hôtel de Soubise

== Gallery ==
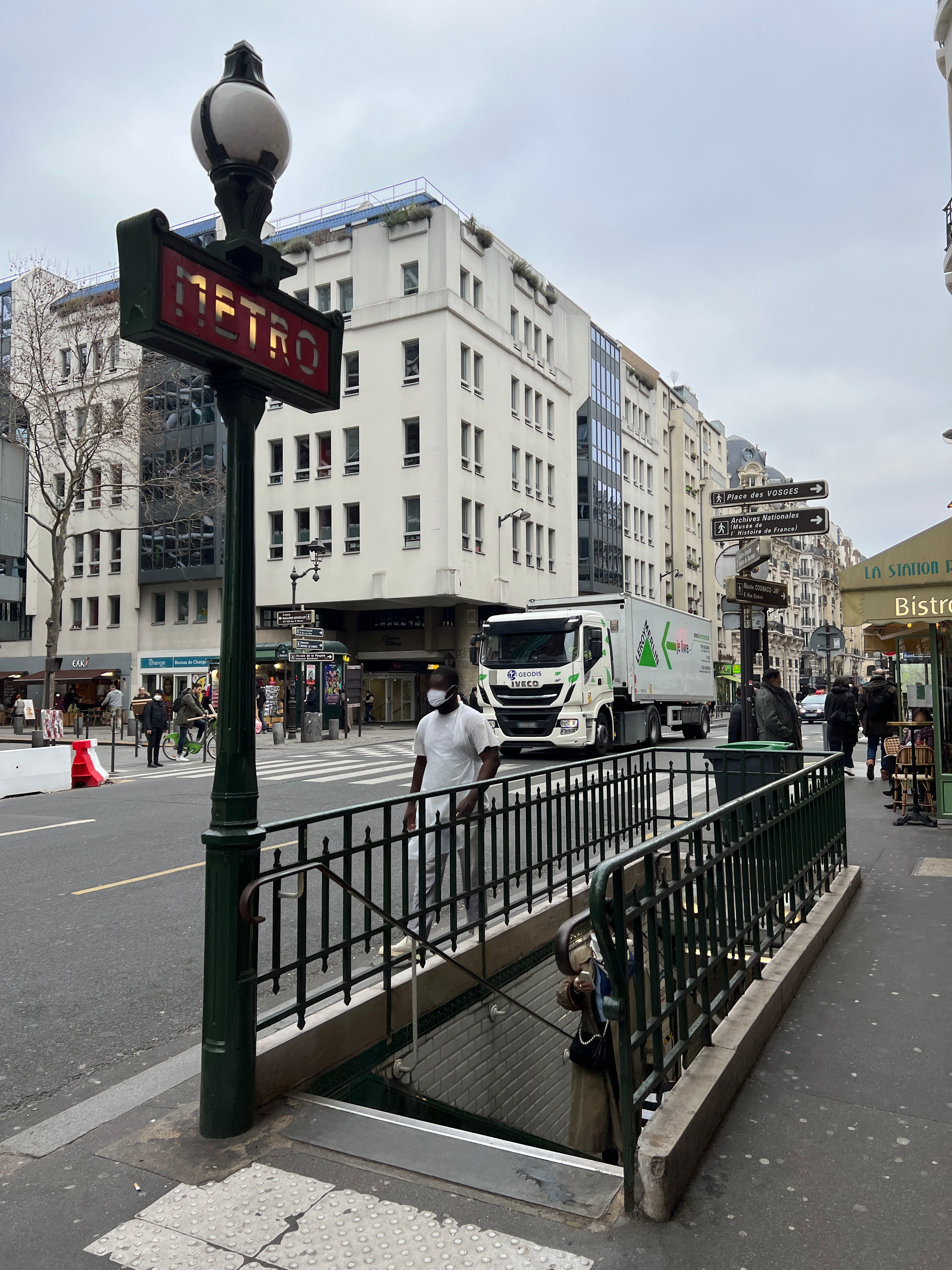

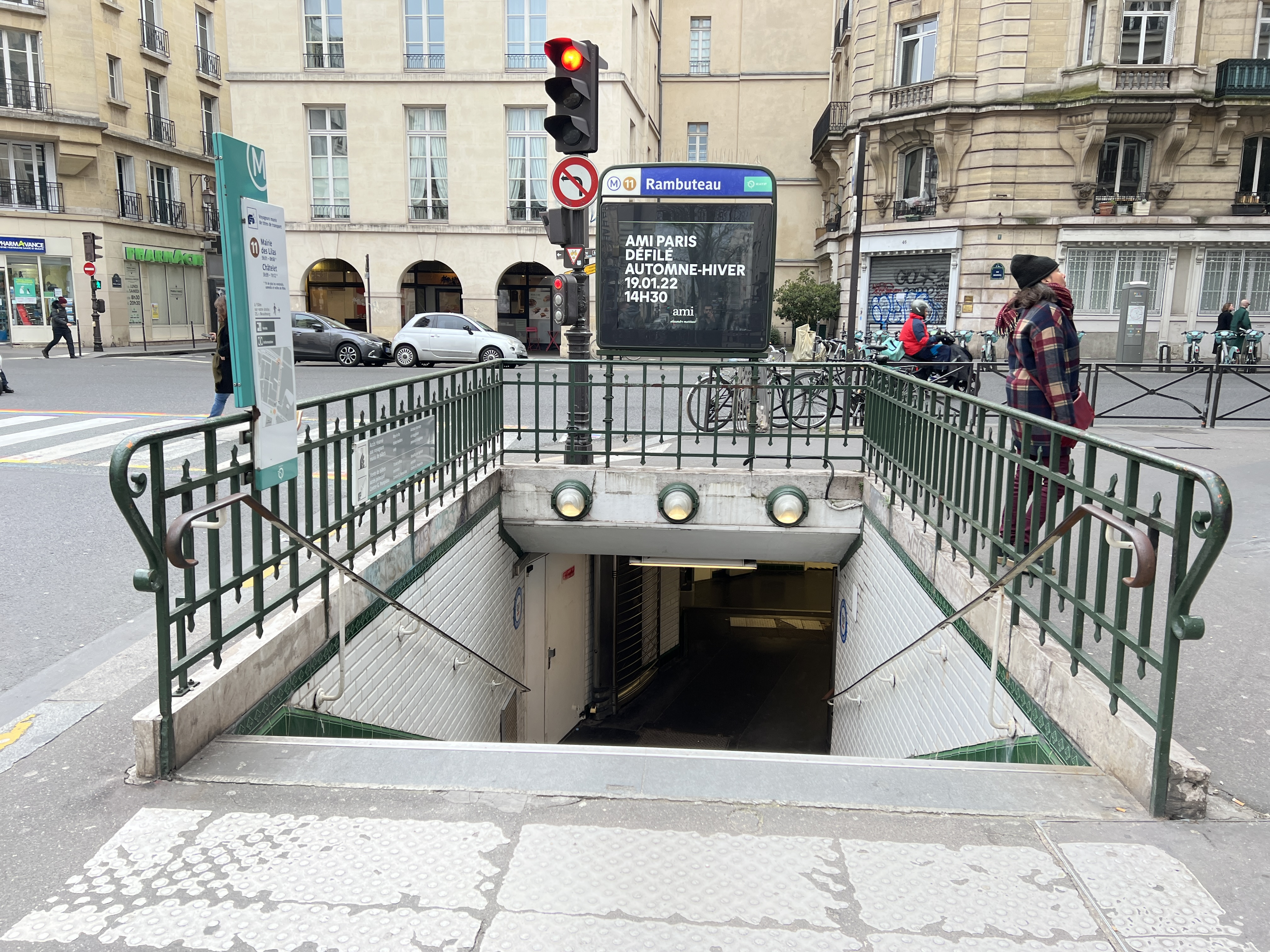

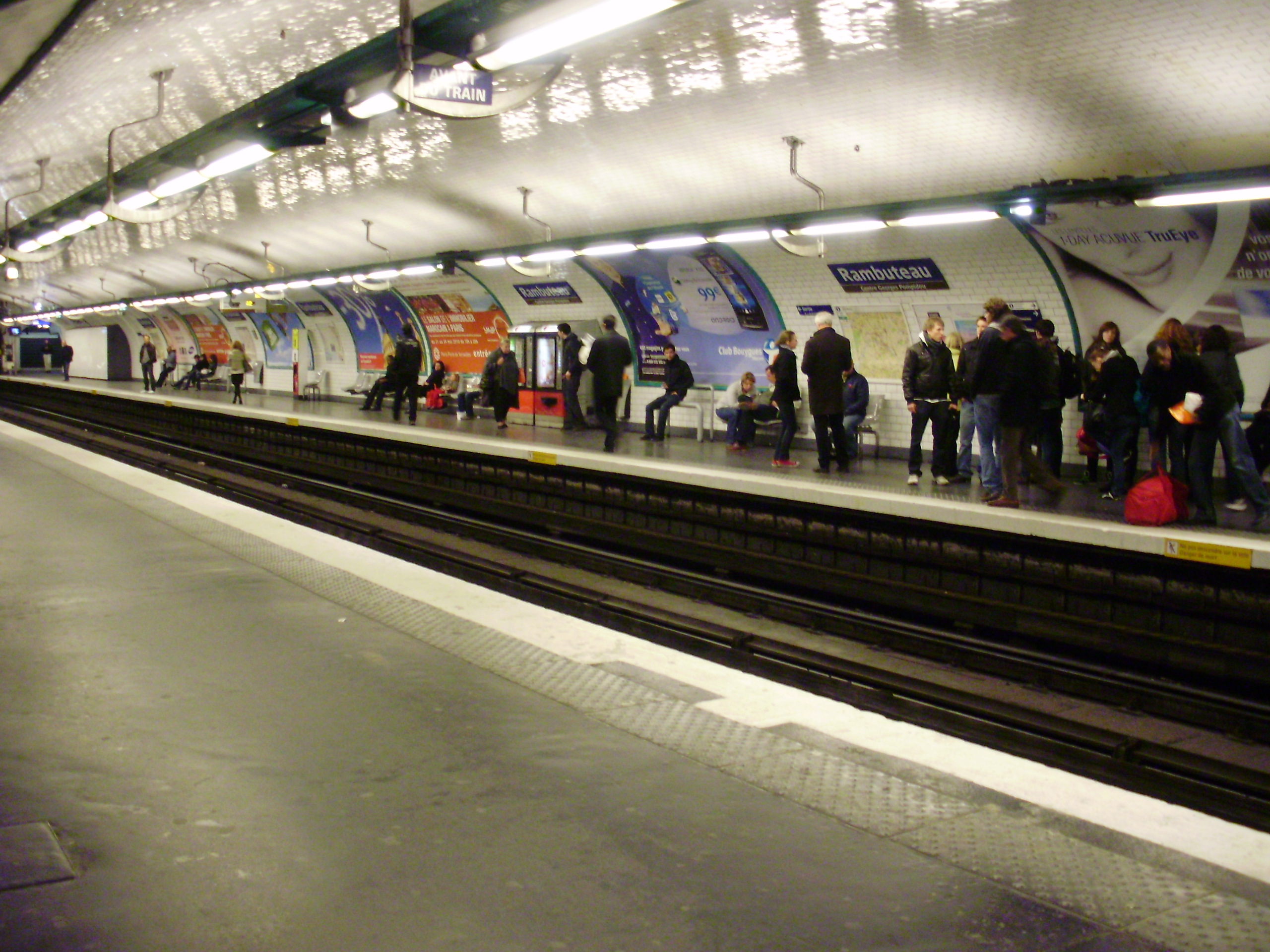
Line 11 platforms at Rambuteau
