= Temple station (Paris Metro) =

Metro station in Paris, France

Temple
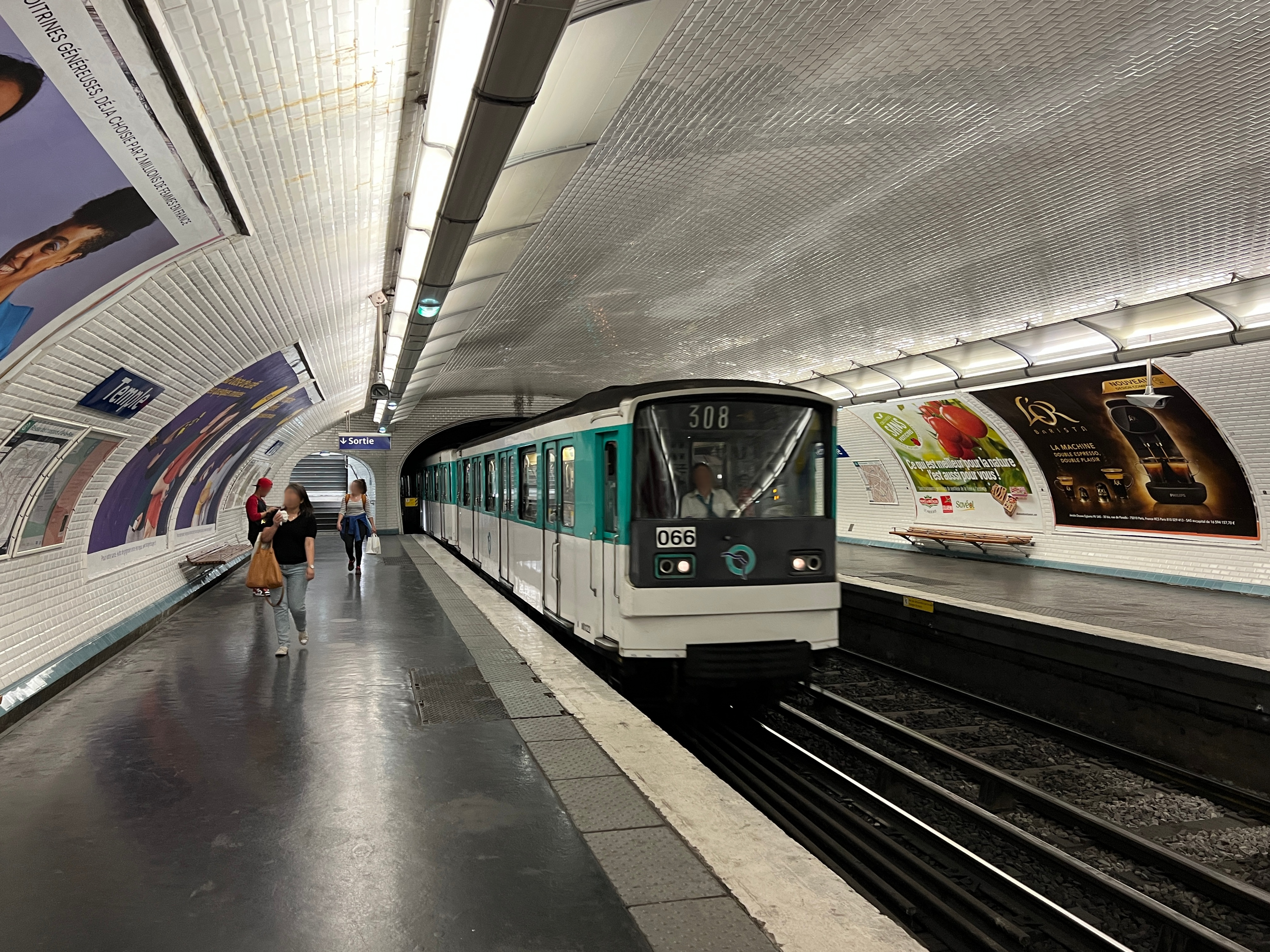

General information
- Location: Rue du Temple × Rue Turbigo; 3rd arrondissement of Paris; Île-de-France; France
- Coordinates: 48°51′59″N 2°21′38″E
- Owner: RATP
- Operator: RATP

Other information
- Fare zone: 1

History
- Opened: 19 October 1904

Services
Preceding station	Paris Metro	Following station
Arts et Métiers towards Pont de Levallois–Bécon	Line 3	République towards Gallieni
Location
- Location within Paris

Temple (French pronunciation: [tɑ̃pl]) is a station on Paris Métro Line 3, located in the 3rd arrondissement of Paris.

== Location ==
The station is located under Rue de Turbigo at its exit on Rue du Temple, nearby Place Élisabeth-Dmitrieff. Oriented along a northeast–southwest axis, it is located between the Arts et Métiers and République stations, the latter being geographically very close to it.

== History ==
It opened on 19 October 1904 as part of the first section of the line opened between Père Lachaise and Villiers.

It is named after the Temple, a long-demolished Templar fortification that once stood in the square named after it. It is the only Paris Metro station to share its name with a station on the London Underground (Temple station (London Underground)).

As part of the RATP's Renouveau du métro program, the entire station was renovated by 29 October 2003.

In 2018, 1,258,217 travelers entered this station which places it at 209th position of the metro stations for its usage out of 302.

== Passenger services ==
=== Access ===
The station has a single entrance entitled Place Élisabeth-Dmitrieff, leading to said square formed by the corner of Rue du Temple and Rue de Turbigo (named in honor of Elisabeth Dmitrieff on 8 March 2007, International Women's Day). Consisting of a fixed staircase, it is adorned with a Guimard entrance, which is the subject of registration as a historic monuments by a decree of 29 May 1978.

Between the entry and the access corridors to the platform, a mosaic by the French artist Hervé Mathieu-Bachelot has been installed since 1982: Couleur en masses.

=== Station layout ===
Street Level

B1	Mezzanine

Platform level	Side platform, doors will open on the right
Platform level	Westbound	← toward Pont de Levallois – Bécon (Arts et Métiers)
Platform level	Eastbound	toward Gallieni (République) →
Platform level	Side platform, doors will open on the right

=== Platforms ===
Temple is a standard configuration station. It has two platforms separated by the metro tracks and the vault is elliptical. The decoration is in the style used for most metro stations, the lighting canopies are white and rounded in the Gaudin style of the renouveau du métro des années 2000s, and the bevelled white ceramic tiles cover the walls, the vault, the tunnel exits and the outlets of the corridors. The advertising frames are in white ceramic and the name of the station is written in Parisine font on enamelled plates. The platforms are equipped with benches made of wooden slats.

=== Bus connections ===
The station is served by lines 20 and 75 of the RATP Bus Network and, at night, by lines N12 and N23 of the Noctilien network.

== Nearby attractions ==
- Place de la République
- Church of Sainte-Élisabeth-de-Hongrie
- Carreau du Temple (covered market)
- Square du Temple - Elie-Wiesel (park)
- Town hall of the 3rd arrondissement
- École supérieure des arts appliqués Duperré (Duperré College of Applied Arts)
