= Arts et Métiers station =

Paris Metro station

Arts et Métiers
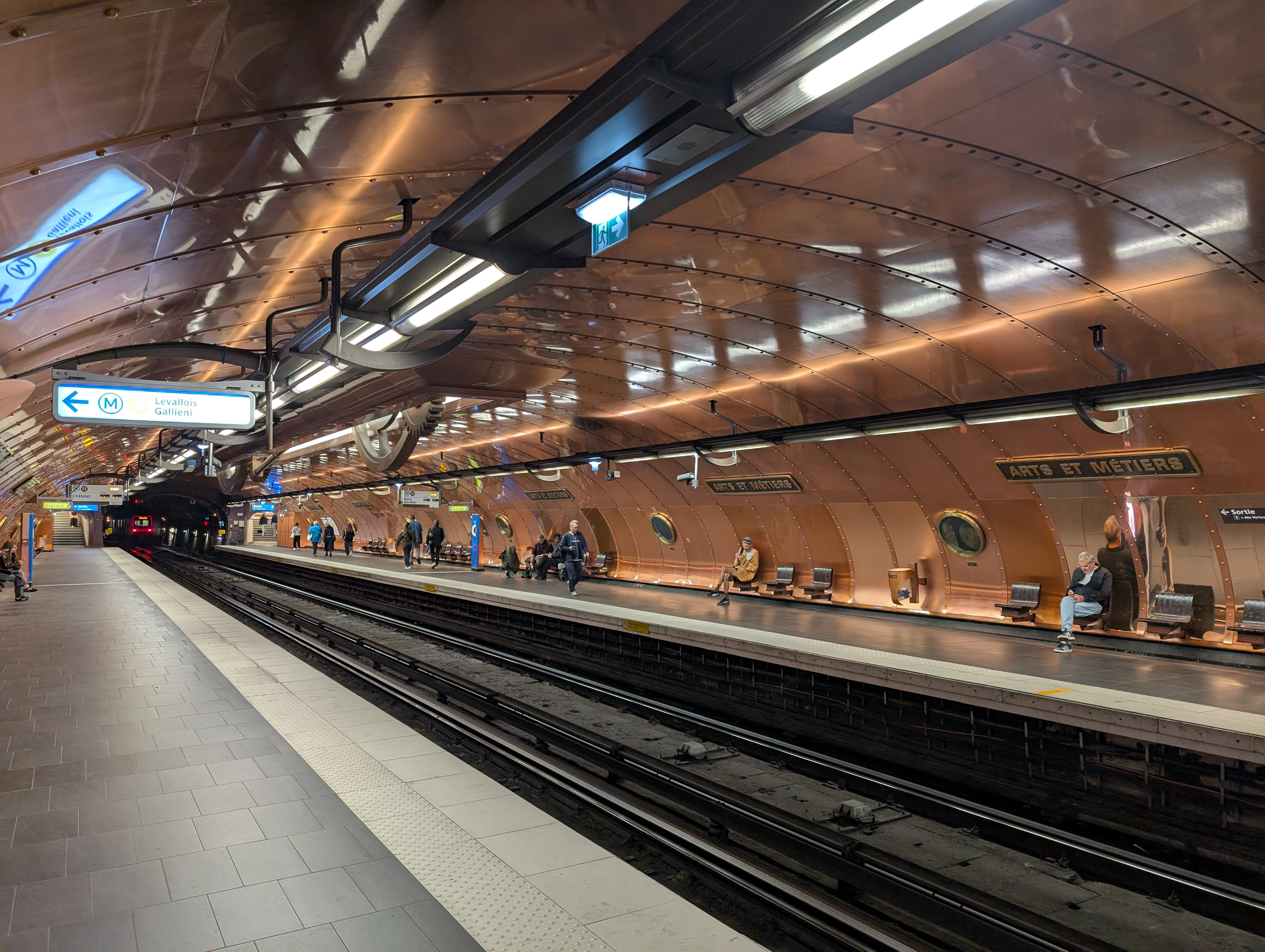
- Line 11 platforms

General information
- Location: 42, Rue Réaumur; 48, Rue Turbigo; 51, Rue Turbigo; 57, Rue Turbigo; Rue des Vertus × Rue Réaumur (two); 3rd arrondissement of Paris; Île-de-France; France
- Coordinates: 48°51′56″N 2°21′22″E
- Owner: RATP
- Operator: RATP

Other information
- Fare zone: 1

History
- Opened: 19 October 1904

Services
| Preceding station | Paris Metro | Following station |
|---|---|---|
| Réaumur–Sébastopol towards Pont de Levallois–Bécon | Line 3 | Temple towards Gallieni |
| Rambuteau towards Châtelet | Line 11 | République towards Rosny–Bois-Perrier |
Location
- Location within Paris

Arts et Métiers (French pronunciation: [aʁz‿e metje], literally "Arts and Trades") is a station on lines 3 and 11 of the Paris Metro. It is located in the 3rd arrondissement.

== Location ==
The station is located at the intersection of Rues Beaubourg, Réaumur and Turbigo, the platforms established:

- on line 3, in a curve under the angle formed by these last two streets and oriented east–west, between Réaumur–Sébastopol and Temple stations;
- on line 11, further east along the east–west axis of Rue Réaumur, between Rambuteau and République.

== History ==
The station opened on 19 October 1904 as part of the first section of the 3 line that then operated between Père Lachaise and Villiers. The platforms on the 11 line opened as part of the original section of that line from Châtelet to Porte des Lilas on 28 April 1935.

It takes its name from the nearby Conservatoire national des arts et métiers, including the Musée des Arts et Métiers, both of which it serves.

The corridors as well as the two lines’ platforms were modernized after 1988, with those of the 3 line being done in the Ouï-dire decorative style, in this case in green. The renovation for the 11-line platforms, designed by Belgian comics artist François Schuiten, marks the October 1994 bicentenary of the conservatoire in a steampunk style reminiscent of the science fiction works of Jules Verne.

In 2018, the station was entered by 4,235,686 travellers, which put it in 119th place among metro stations by usage.

As part of the RATP's Un métro + beau program on the one hand and the extension of the 11 line to Rosny–Bois-Perrier on the other, the corridors of the station were renovated from 12 September 2019 to 3 December 2020 to test coating materials for future stations.

== Passenger services ==
=== Access ===
The station has five entrances all made up of fixed staircases, the first four being adorned with a Dervaux candelabrum:

- entrance 1 - Rue Conté, rue de Turbigo - odd numbered side leading to the right of 57, rue de Turbigo;
- entrance 2 - Rue Réaumur, rue de Turbigo - even numbers side located opposite 42, rue Réaumur;
- entrance 3 - Rue de Turbigo, rue Beaubourg located at the right of 107, rue de Turbigo and 48, rue Réaumur;
- entrance 4 - Rue Réaumur leading to 31, Rue de Turbigo and 51, Rue Réaumur;
- entrance 5 - Rue des Vertus, only allowing exit from the platforms of line 11, located at the right of 22 Rue Réaumur.

=== Station layout ===
| G | Street Level | Exit/Entrance |
| B1 | Mezzanine | to Exits/Entrances |
| B2 | Side platform, doors will open on the right |
| B2 | Westbound | ← toward Pont de Levallois–Bécon (Réaumur–Sébastopol) |
| B2 | Eastbound | toward Gallieni (Temple) → |
| B2 | Side platform, doors will open on the right |
| B3 | Side platform, doors will open on the right |
| B3 | Southbound | ← toward Châtelet (Rambuteau) |
| B3 | Northbound | toward Rosny–Bois-Perrier (République) → |
| B3 | Side platform, doors will open on the right |

=== Platforms ===
The platforms of the two lines, seventy-five meters long, are of standard configuration. Two in number per stopping point, they are separated by the metro tracks located in the centre and the vault is elliptical.

The station on line 3 is set up in a curve and its decoration is in the Ouï-dire style in a green colour. The lighting frames, of the same shade, are supported by curved supports in the shape of a scythe. The direct lighting is white while the indirect lighting, projected on the vault, is multi-coloured. The white ceramic tiles are flat and cover the walls, the vault (diagonally, a peculiarity that the stopping point only shares with Nation on line 1), the tunnel exit and the outlets of the corridors. The advertising frames are green and cylindrical, and the name of the station is written in capital letters on enamelled plates. The platforms are equipped with Motte style seats and green sit-stand benches.

The station on line 11 has been completely covered since October 1994 with copper plates riveted to each other, and not the usual earthenware tiles. This dressing was put in place during the bicentennial ceremonies of the Conservatoire National des Arts et Métiers. It is the work of Benoît Peeters, French screenwriter, and François Schuiten, Belgian designer, authors of the series Les Cités obscures. The traveller is plunged inside a vast machine, a sort of underground Nautilus evoking the atmosphere of Twenty Thousand Leagues Under the Seas, in steampunk style. On the station's ceiling, a series of large cogs evokes the Musée des Arts et Métiers. Copper, the only material used, evokes the technical and industrial world. On the platforms, a series of portholes open onto small scenographies, centred on the museum's collections. You observe a armillary sphere, the Telstar satellite, or even a water wheel. All the station's furniture suits the decoration style and constitutes a unique case on the network. Name plates, wooden seats, waste bins, flat tunnel exits, alarm post banners and the lighting are brown in the Ouï-dire style. However, the latter do not have multi-coloured lighting and the light is diffused in a semi-subdued way on the track side. The platforms are devoid of advertisements.

=== Bus connections ===
The station is served by lines 20 and 75 of the RATP Bus Network and, at night, by lines N12 and N23 of the Noctilien network.

== Nearby ==
- Conservatoire national des arts et métiers
- Musée des arts et métiers

== Gallery ==
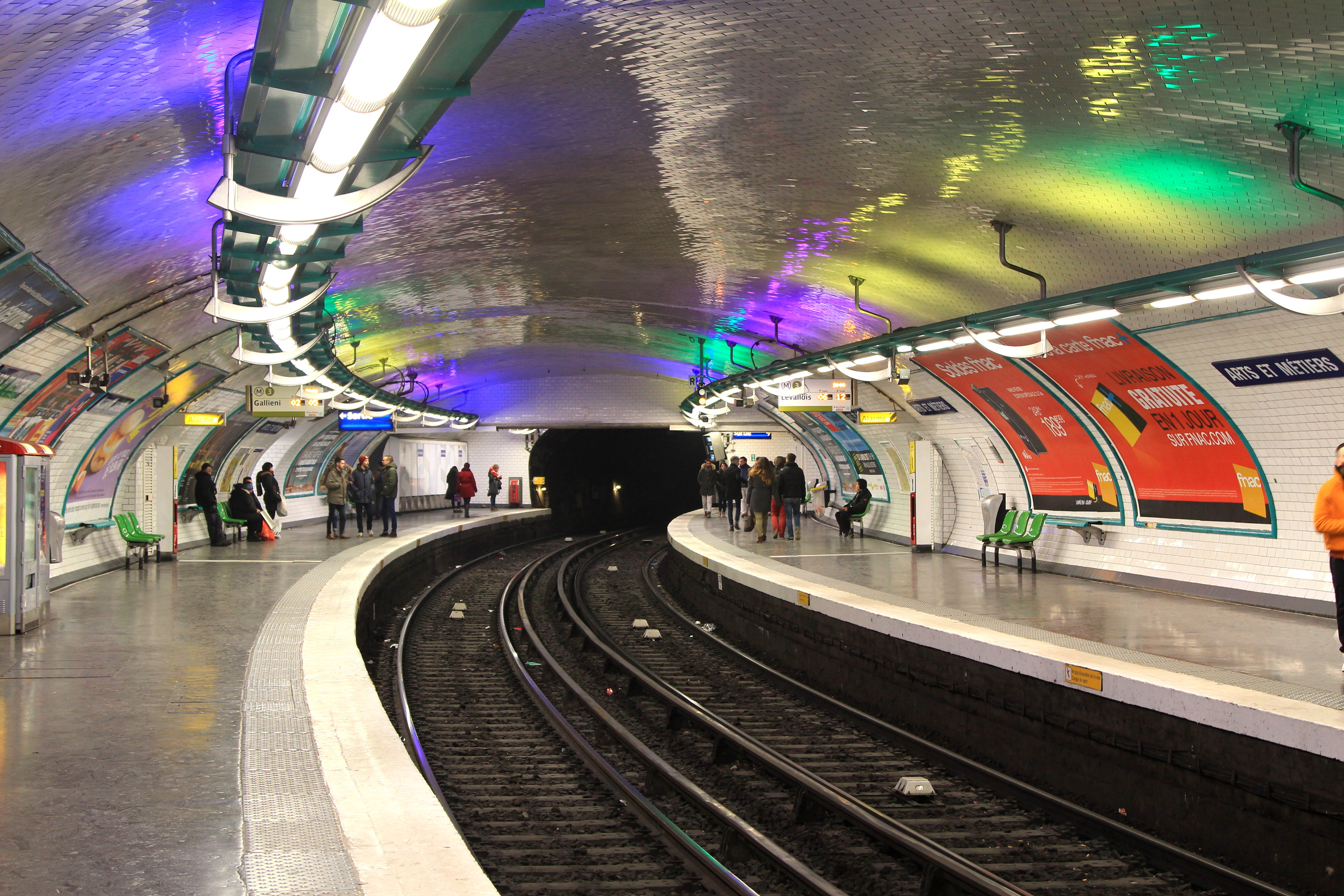
Line 3 platforms at Arts et Métiers

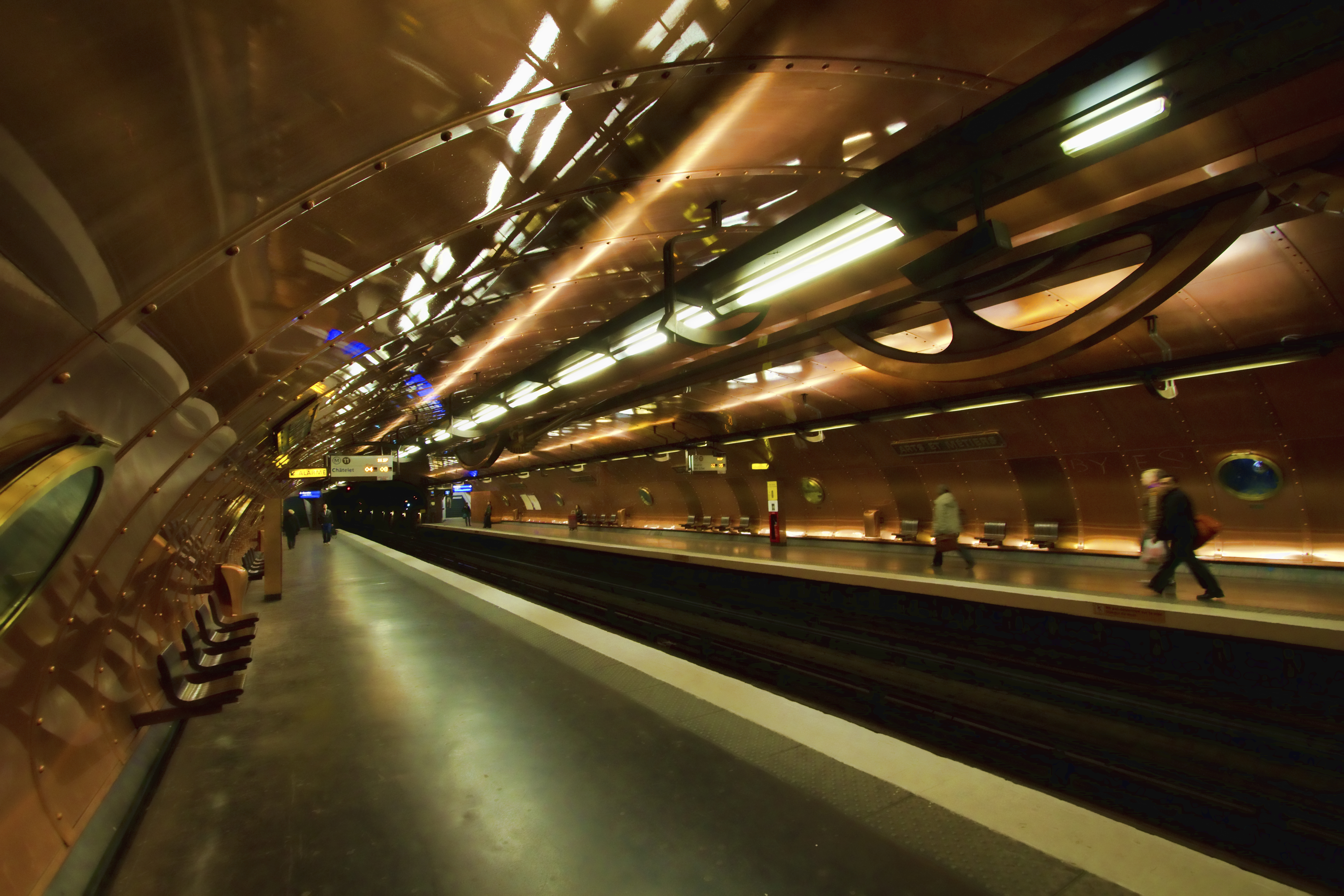
Line 11 platforms at Arts et Métiers

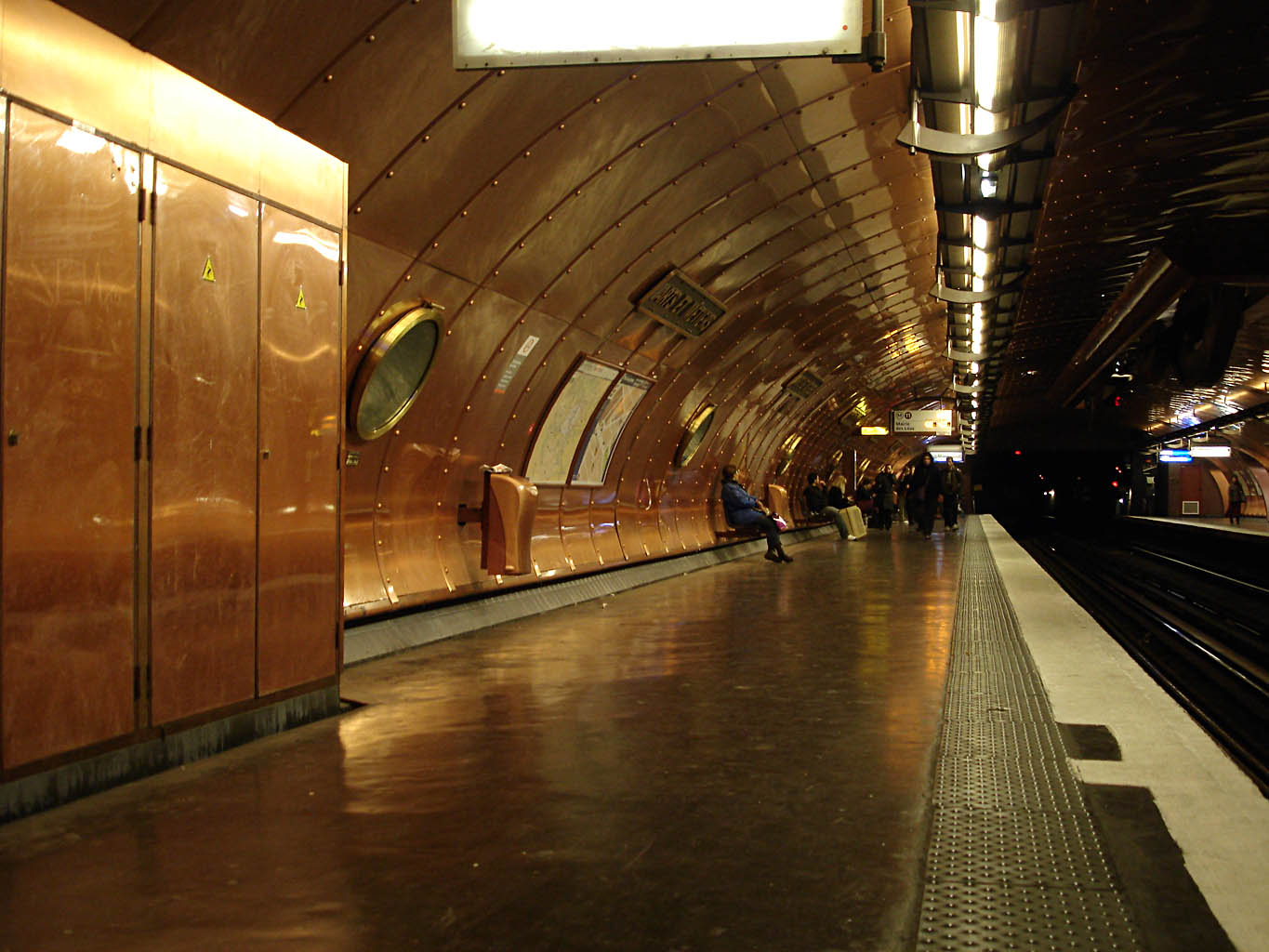
Line 11 platforms

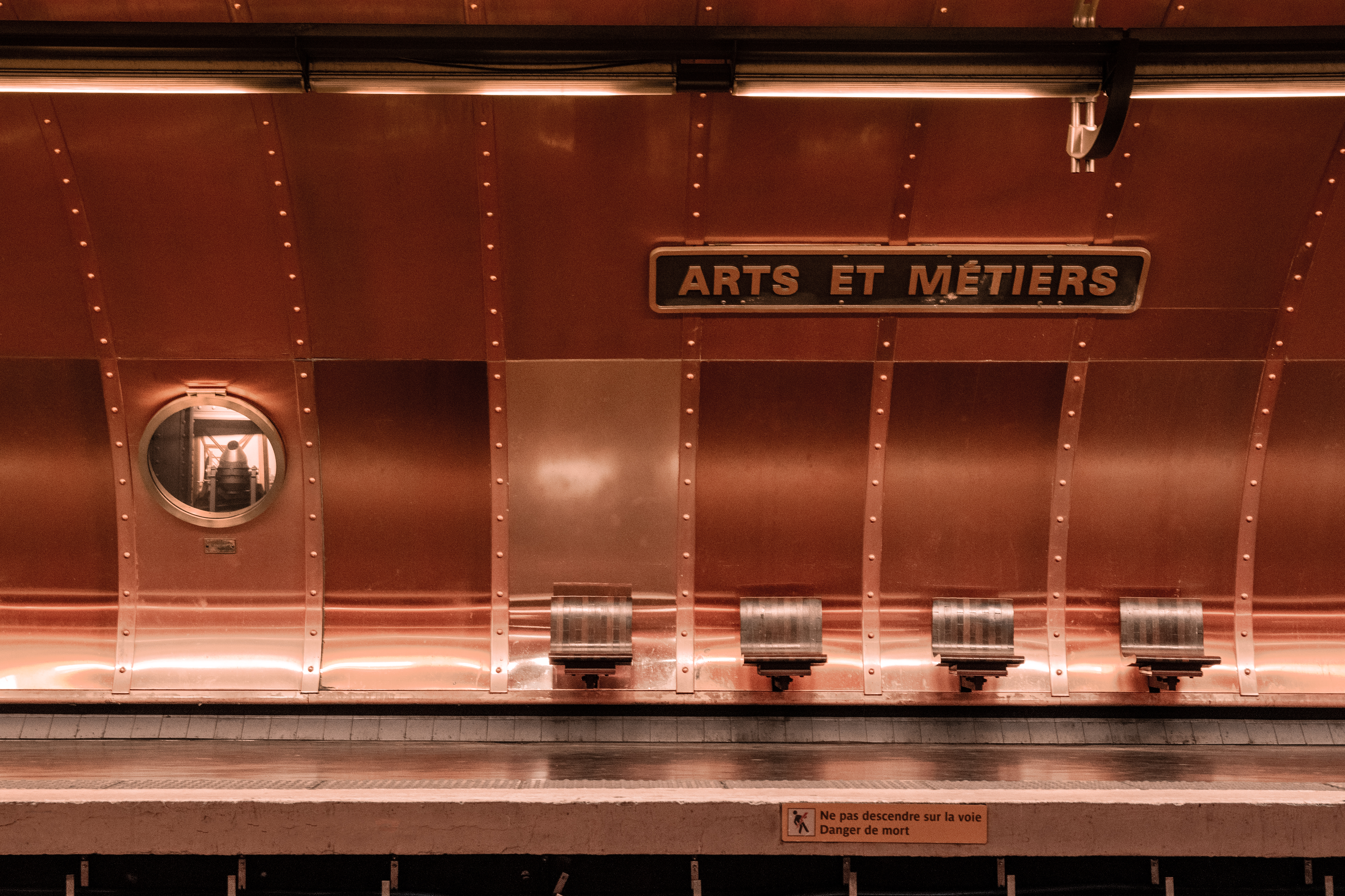
Line 11 platforms

MP 59 rolling stock on Line 11 at Arts et Métiers
