= République station =

Metro station in Paris, France

République
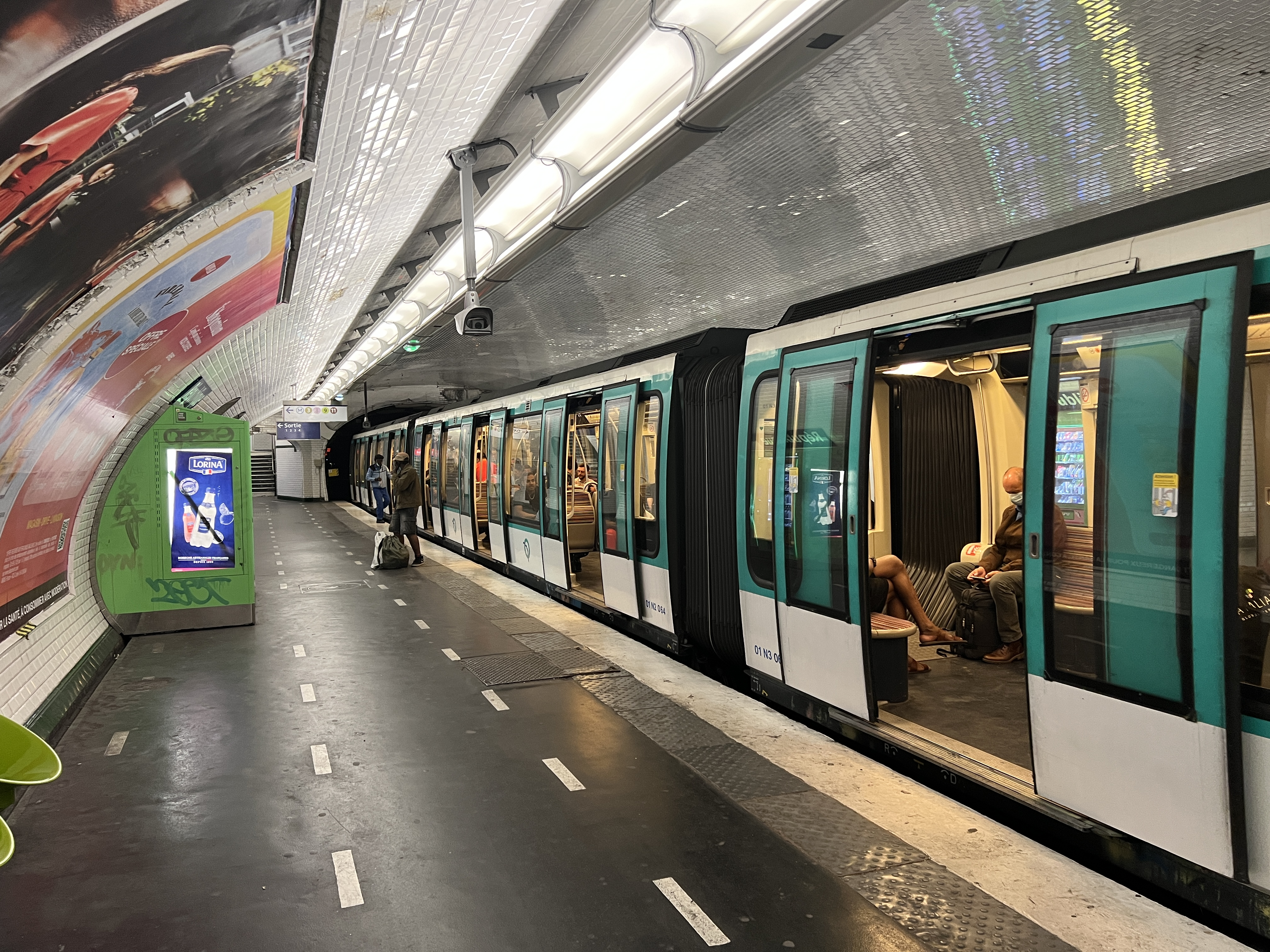
- Line 5 platforms at République

General information
- Location: 2, 10, 12, 13, 14, 15, Pl. de la République; 1, Rue du Faubourg du Temple; 1, Rue René Boulanger; 2, 9, Boul. Saint-Martin; Sq. de la Fontaine; 1, Boul. Voltaire; 3rd, 10th and 11th arrondissement of Paris; Île-de-France; France
- Coordinates: 48°52′03″N 2°21′50″E
- Owner: RATP
- Operator: RATP

Other information
- Fare zone: 1

History
- Opened: 19 October 1904 (Line 3); 15 November 1907 (Line 5); 5 May 1931 (Line 8); 10 December 1933 (Line 9); 28 April 1935 (Line 11)

Passengers
- 2021: 11,079,708

Services
Preceding station	Paris Metro	Following station
Temple towards Pont de Levallois–Bécon	Line 3	Parmentier towards Gallieni
Oberkampf towards Place d'Italie	Line 5	Jacques Bonsergent towards Bobigny–Pablo Picasso
Strasbourg–Saint-Denis towards Pont de Sèvres	Line 9	Oberkampf towards Mairie de Montreuil
Arts et Métiers towards Châtelet	Line 11	Goncourt towards Rosny–Bois-Perrier
Service suspended
Strasbourg–Saint-Denis towards Balard	Line 8	Filles du Calvaire towards Pointe du Lac
Location
- Location within Paris

République (French pronunciation: [ʁepyblik]) is a station on lines 3, 5, 8, 9 and 11 of the Paris Métro. It is located under the Place de la République, at the tripoint border of the 3rd, 10th and 11th arrondissements. It is an important interchange station; its 16.6 million users (2019) make it the seventh busiest out of 302 on the Métro network.

== Location ==
The station is located under Place de la République, the platforms established:

- on Line 3, under the eastern part of the square along the east–west axis of the Avenue de la République (between Temple and Parmentier stations);
- on Line 5, north-west of the square on a north-west/south-east axis, at the end of the Boulevard de Magenta (between Jacques Bonsergent and Oberkampf);
- on Line 8 and Line 9, west of the square on a north-west/south-east axis, at the end of Boulevard Saint-Martin (between Strasbourg–Saint-Denis on the one hand—not including the current ghost station Saint-Martin—and on the other hand Filles du Calvaire for Line 8 or Oberkampf for Line 9);
- on Line 11, north-east along a north-east/south-west axis, at the start of the Rue du Faubourg-du-Temple (between Arts et Métiers and Goncourt).

== History ==
The station opened on 19 October 1904 as part of the first section of Line 3 between Père Lachaise and Villiers. The Line 5 platforms opened on 15 November 1907 with the extension of the line from Jacques Bonsergent (then called Lancry) to Gare du Nord. The Line 8 platforms opened on 5 May 1931 with the extension of the line from Richelieu–Drouot to Porte de Charenton. The Line 9 platforms opened on 10 December 1933 with the extension of the line from Richelieu-Drouot to Porte de Montreuil. The Line 11 platforms opened on 28 April 1935 with the opening of the line from Châtelet to Porte des Lilas.

=== Name ===
It is named after the Place de la République, which was named to commemorate the First, Second and Third French Republics in 1879.

=== Renovation ===
The platforms of Line 3 were among the first to receive a metallic bodywork after 1952, while those of Line 5 were renovated after 1969 by adopting the Mouton-Duvernet style with vertically-aligned multi-toned tiles, cutting radically with the dominant white of the original metro, as well as the light frames characteristic of this type of arrangement, which was then supplemented with Motte style seats and red sit-stand bars. Larger Mouton style tiles placed vertically also cover certain outlets of the access corridors to Lines 3 and 11. The platforms of Lines 8, 9 and 11 were modernised in Andreu-Motte style, in yellow for the first two stations and red for the third as was done to a third of other the stations on the network between 1974 and 1984, while those on Line 3 lost their metal panels after 1988 in favour of a Ouï-dire decoration, in this case blue.

As part of the RATP Renouveau du métro programme, the station's corridors and the platforms on Line 5 were modernised on 28 June 2010, which notably allowed the renewal of lighting and earthenware tiles, the installation of new signage, a sales and comptoir-club counter, as well as the creation of four automatic ticket machines, anticipating the redevelopment programme by the City of Paris of the Place de la République. These latest above ground works are suspected to be the cause of numerous water leakages in the station, destroying the repairs completed three years earlier. The cost of repairs is estimated at eight million euros.

From 30 June to 3 August 2018, the platforms of Line 11 are the first of the latter to be raised and tiled for their adaptation as part of its extension to Rosny–Bois-Perrier.

As of July 2026, Line 8 services at République are suspended due to renovations at République station. Line 8 trains will skip this station and continue to Strasbourg–Saint-Denis if westbound, and to Filles du Calvaire if eastbound. This suspension is expected to last until April 2027.

=== Usage ===
The station is the seventh in the Métro network in terms of traffic, with 18,327,920 incoming passengers in 2018.

== Passenger services ==
=== Access ===
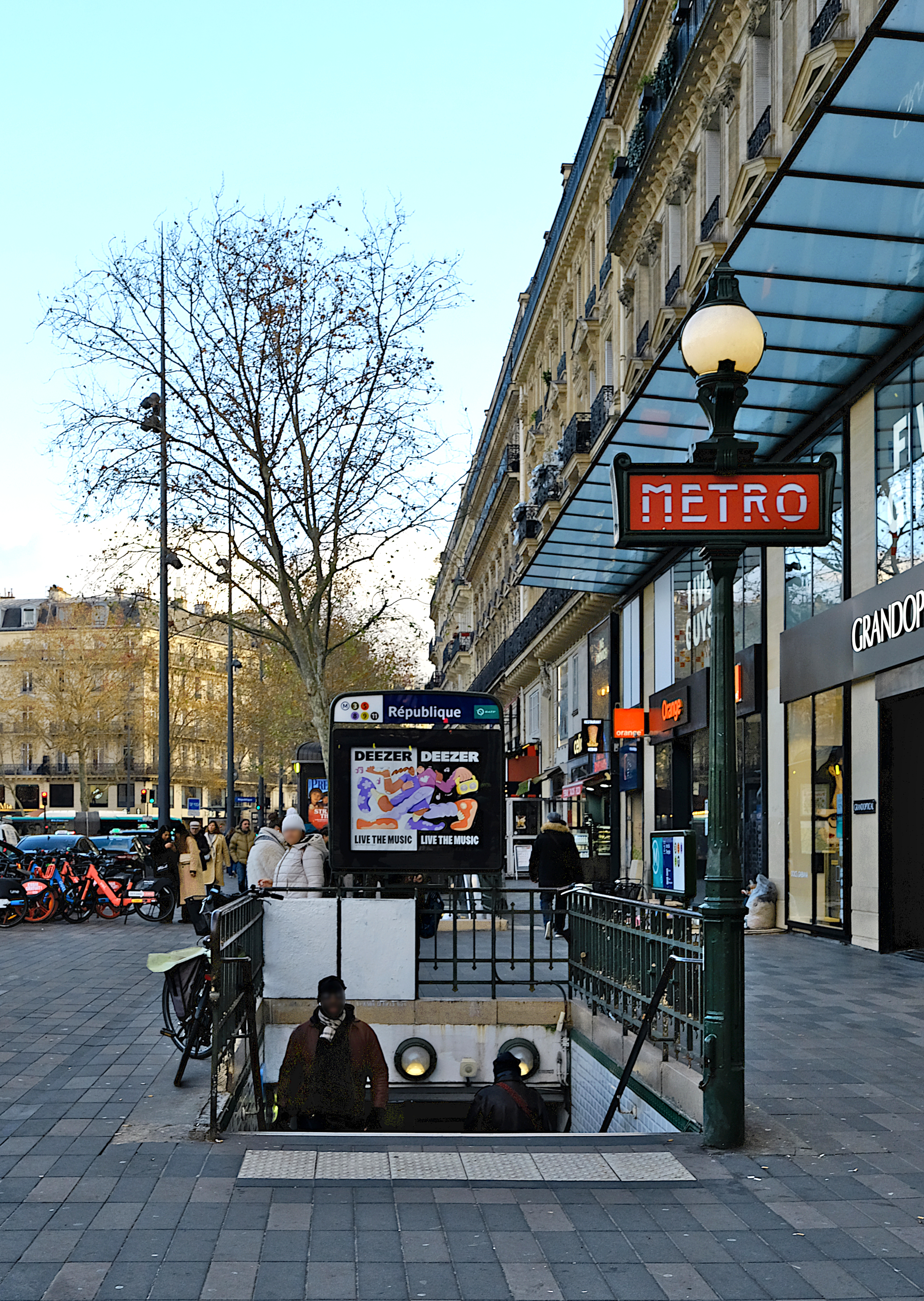
Access to the subway station of the Republic, place de la République - Paris 3e.

The station has nine entrances:

- Place de la République, Rue René-Boulanger;
- Boulevard Saint-Martin, even numbers side;
- Boulevard Saint-Martin, odd numbers side;
- Boulevard Magenta;
- Place de la République, Rue du Faubourg-du-Temple;
- Place de la République, Rue du Faubourg du Temple side;
- Place de la République;
- Place de la République, statue side;
- Republic Square, Rue du Temple,

=== Station layout ===
G	Street Level	Exit/Entrance
B1	Mezzanine	Fare control
Line 5 platforms	Side platform, doors will open on the right
Line 5 platforms	Southbound	← toward Place d'Italie (Oberkampf)
Line 5 platforms	Northbound	toward Bobigny–Pablo Picasso (Jacques Bonsergent) →
Line 5 platforms	Side platform, doors will open on the right
Lines 8/9 platforms	Side platform, doors will open on the right
Lines 8/9 platforms	Westbound	← toward Balard (Strasbourg–Saint-Denis)
Lines 8/9 platforms	Wall
Lines 8/9 platforms	Side platform, doors will open on the right
Lines 8/9 platforms	Westbound	← toward Pont de Sèvres (Strasbourg–Saint-Denis)
Lines 8/9 platforms	Eastbound	toward Mairie de Montreuil (Oberkampf) →
Lines 8/9 platforms	Side platform, doors will open on the right
Lines 8/9 platforms	Wall
Lines 8/9 platforms	Eastbound	toward Pointe du Lac (Filles du Calvaire) →
Lines 8/9 platforms	Side platform, doors will open on the right
Line 3 platforms	Side platform, doors will open on the right
Line 3 platforms	Westbound	← toward Pont de Levallois–Bécon (Temple)
Line 3 platforms	Eastbound	toward Gallieni (Parmentier) →
Line 3 platforms	Side platform, doors will open on the right
Line 11 platforms	Side platform, doors will open on the right
Line 11 platforms	Southbound	← toward Châtelet (Arts et Métiers)
Line 11 platforms	Northbound	toward Rosny–Bois-Perrier (Goncourt) →
Line 11 platforms	Side platform, doors will open on the right

- Note: tracks toward Oberkampf (Lines 5 and 9) run in the same direction.

=== Platforms ===
The Line 3 station has a standard configuration with two platforms separated by metro tracks. The decoration is in the Ouï-dire style in a blue colour. The frames for lighting, in the same colour, are supported by curved supports in the shape of a scythe. Indirect lighting is bicolour (very pale blue and white), unlike other lighting strips of this style where it is a vivid multicolour. The white ceramic tiles are flat and cover the walls, the vault, and the tunnel exit. The advertising frames are white and cylindrical, and the platforms are equipped with Motte style seats as well as blue sit-stand benches.

The station on Line 5 is also styled in a classic layout. The decoration is in the style used for most Métro stations. The lighting strips are white and rounded in the Gaudin style of the Renouveau du métro des années 2000; the bevelled white ceramic tiles cover the walls, the vault, and the tunnel exit. The advertising frames are in white ceramic and the seats are green Akiko style.

The stations of Lines 8 and 9 are made up of two half-stations per line, those of Line 9 framing those of Line 8. The platforms of these two lines, slightly curved at the western end, are furnished in the style Andreu-Motte and have a yellow light canopy, benches in flat orange-yellow tiling (except the platform for Pont de Sèvres almost deprived of benches but with a corridor opening treated with the same tiles) as well as yellow Motte seats. These arrangements are combined with white bevelled tiling for the two lines, while the staircase surrounds and the surface of the bench seats on the platform towards Pont de Sèvres are treated with white flat tiling. The advertising frames are metallic.

Finally, the station on Line 11 is also of standard configuration. It is decorated in the Andreu-Motte style with two red lighting frames, benches and outlets of the corridors are of flat tiles of the same colour and red Motte seats. The walls, the vault and the tunnel exits are covered with flat white tiles. The advertising frames are metallic, and the platforms are tiled in anthracite grey.

For each stopping point, the vault is elliptical, and the name of the station is written in Parisine font on enamelled plates.

=== Bus connections ===
The station is served by lines 20, 56, 75 and 91 of the RATP bus network as well as, at night, by lines N01, N02, N12, and N23 of the Noctilien bus network.

== Nearby ==
- Place de la République
- Bourse du Travail

== Gallery ==
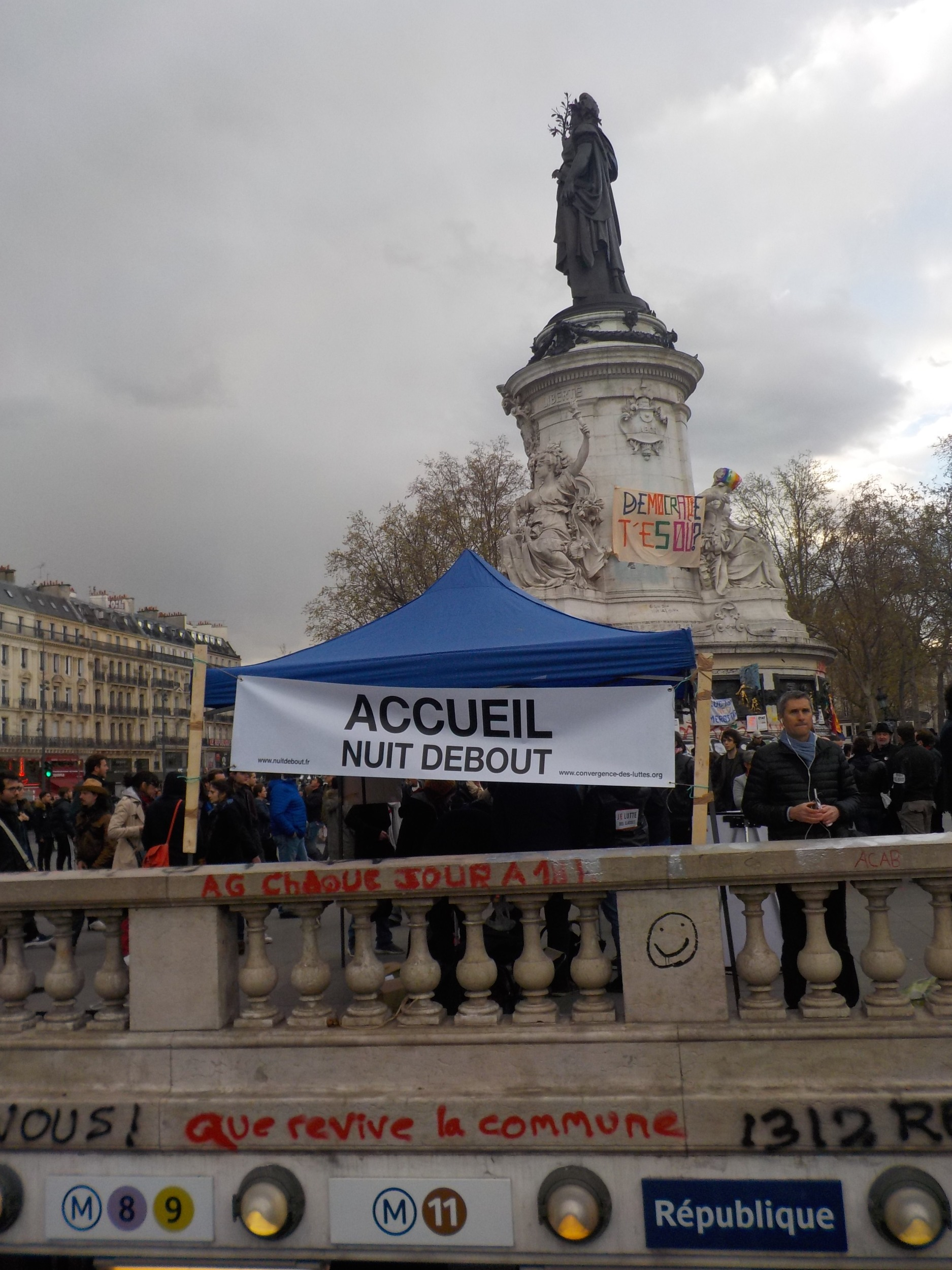
Station entrance and Monument à la République during the Nuit debout movement, 2016

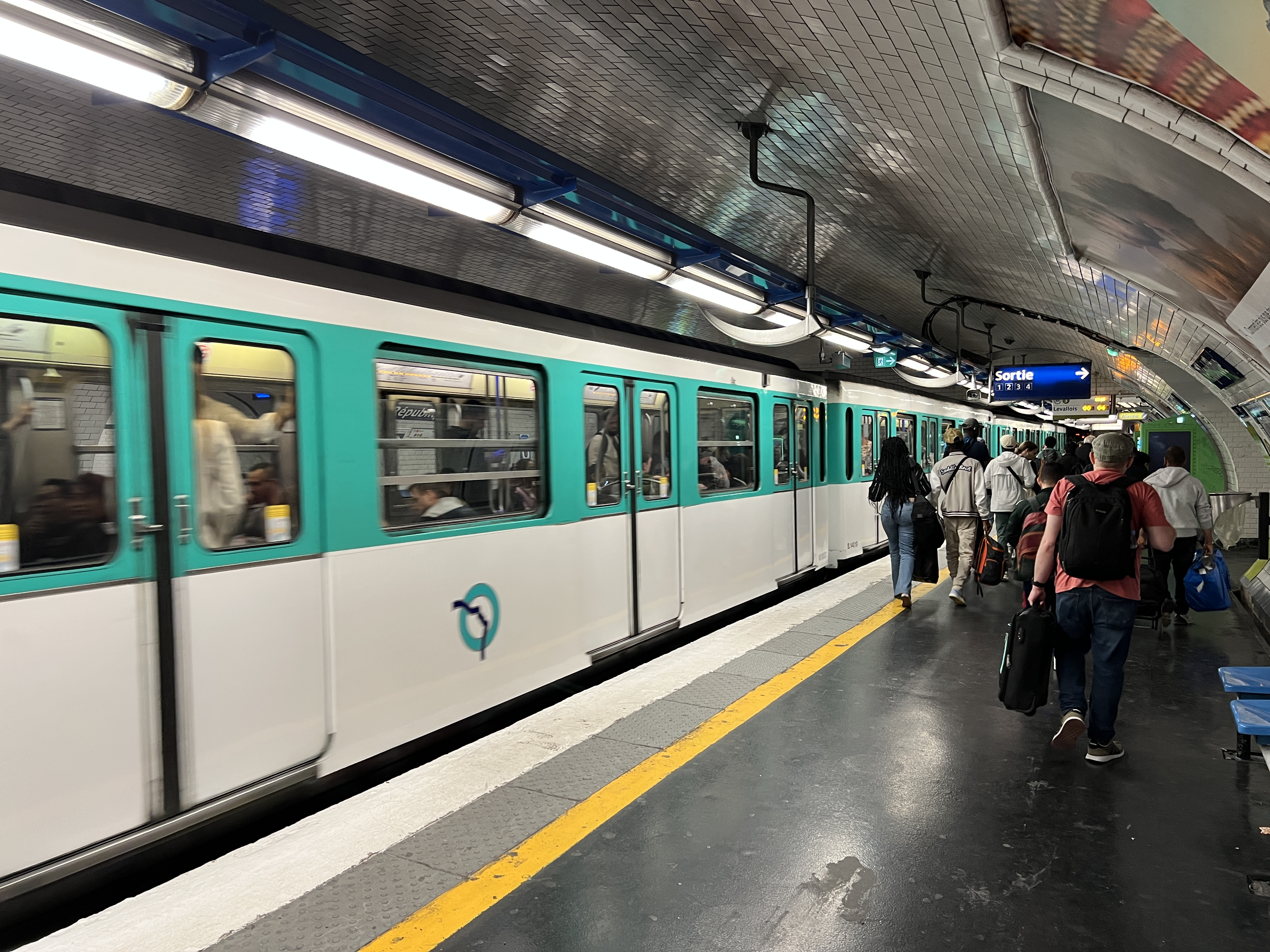
Line 3 platforms at République

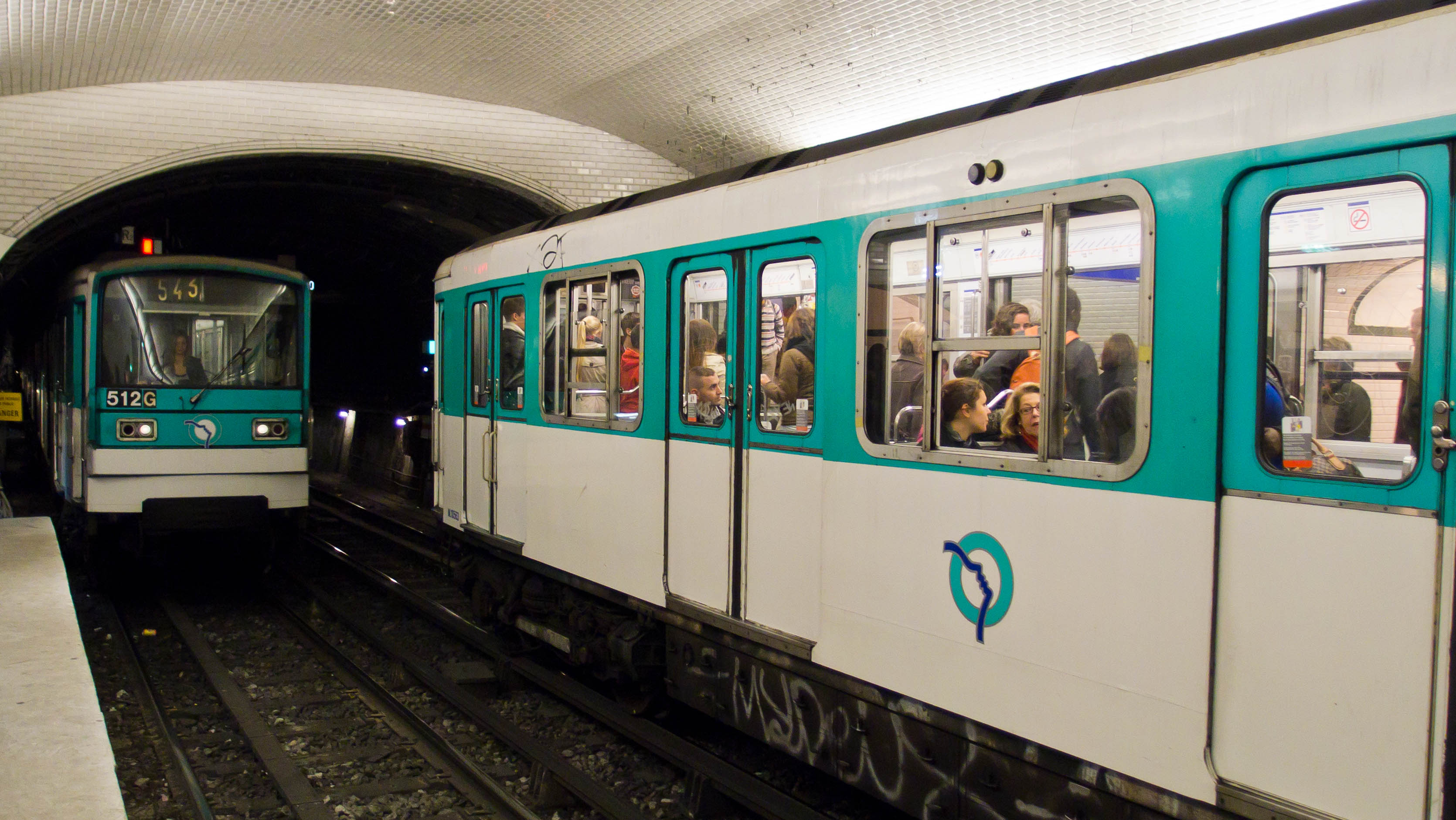
MF 67 rolling stock on Line 5

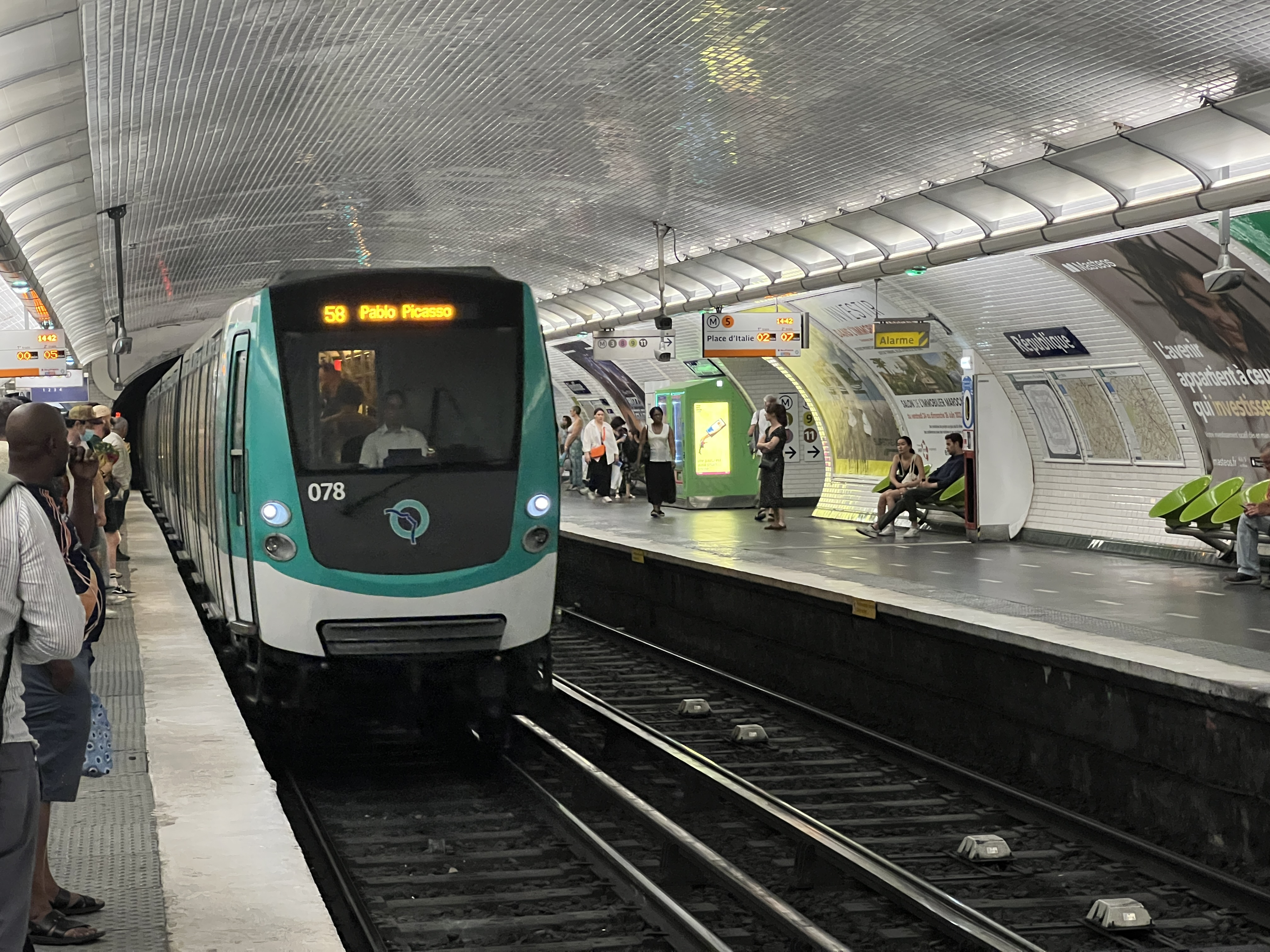
MF 01 rolling stock at République

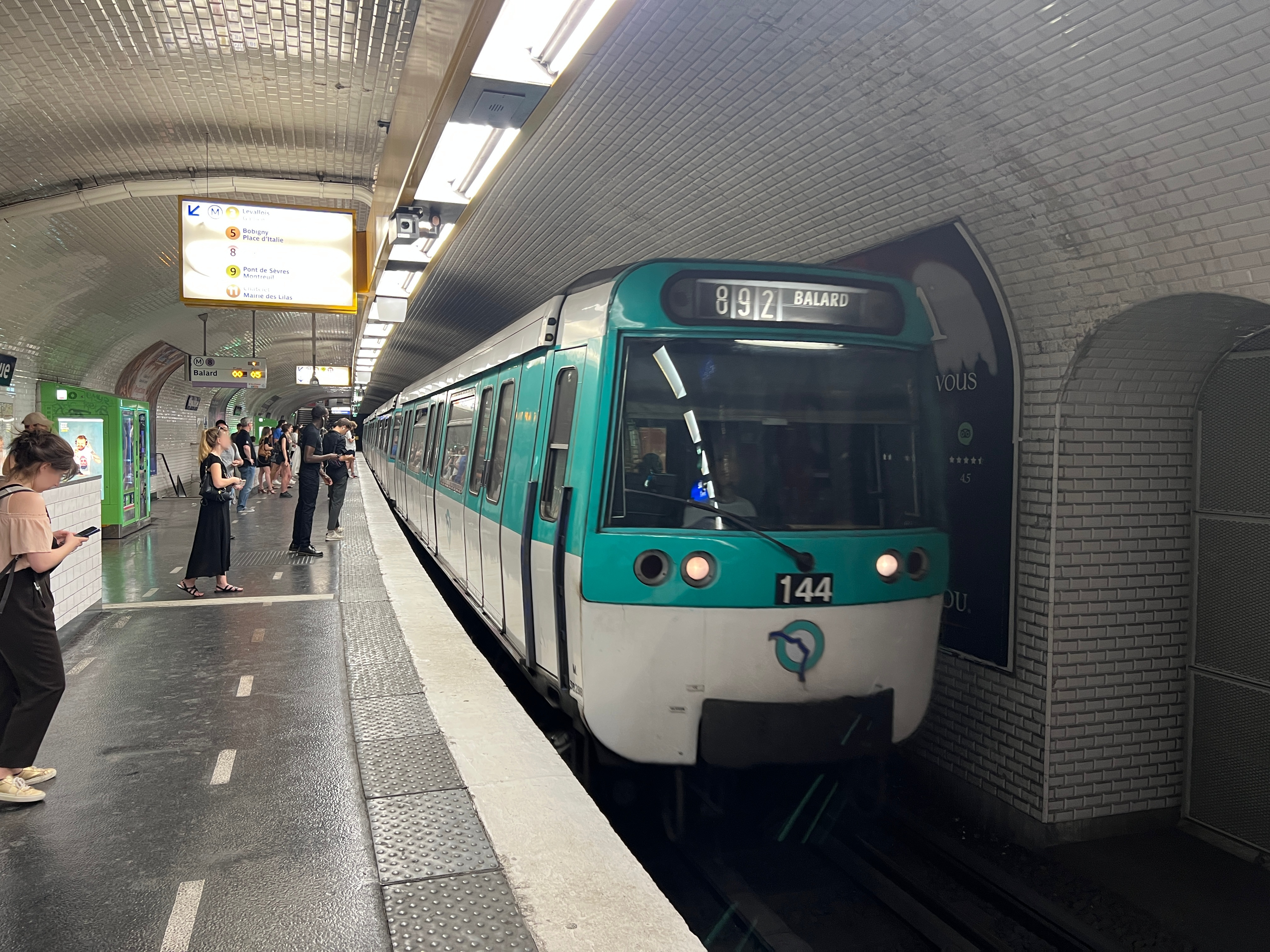
Line 8 platforms at République

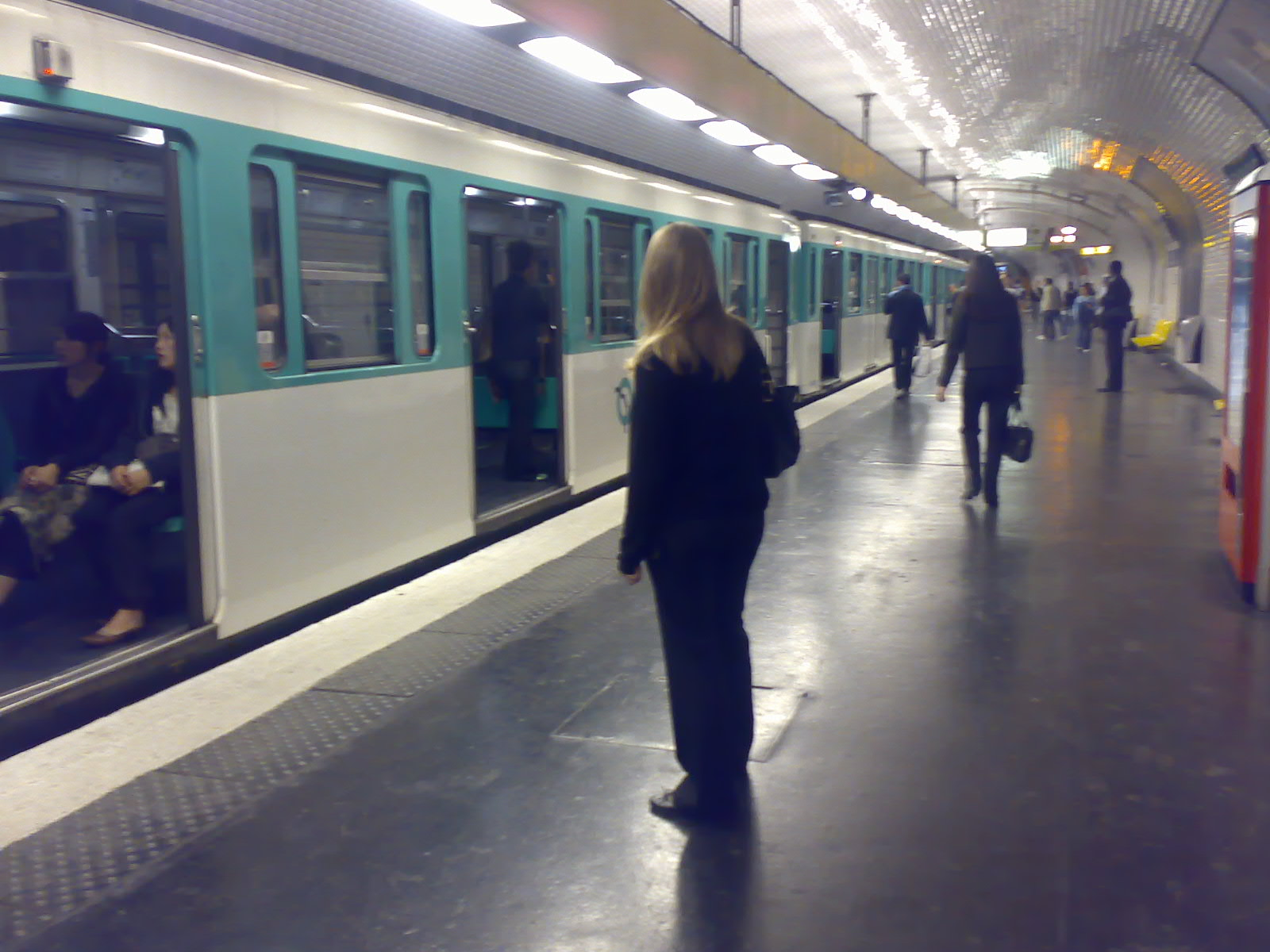
Line 9 platforms at République with a now-retired MF 67 train

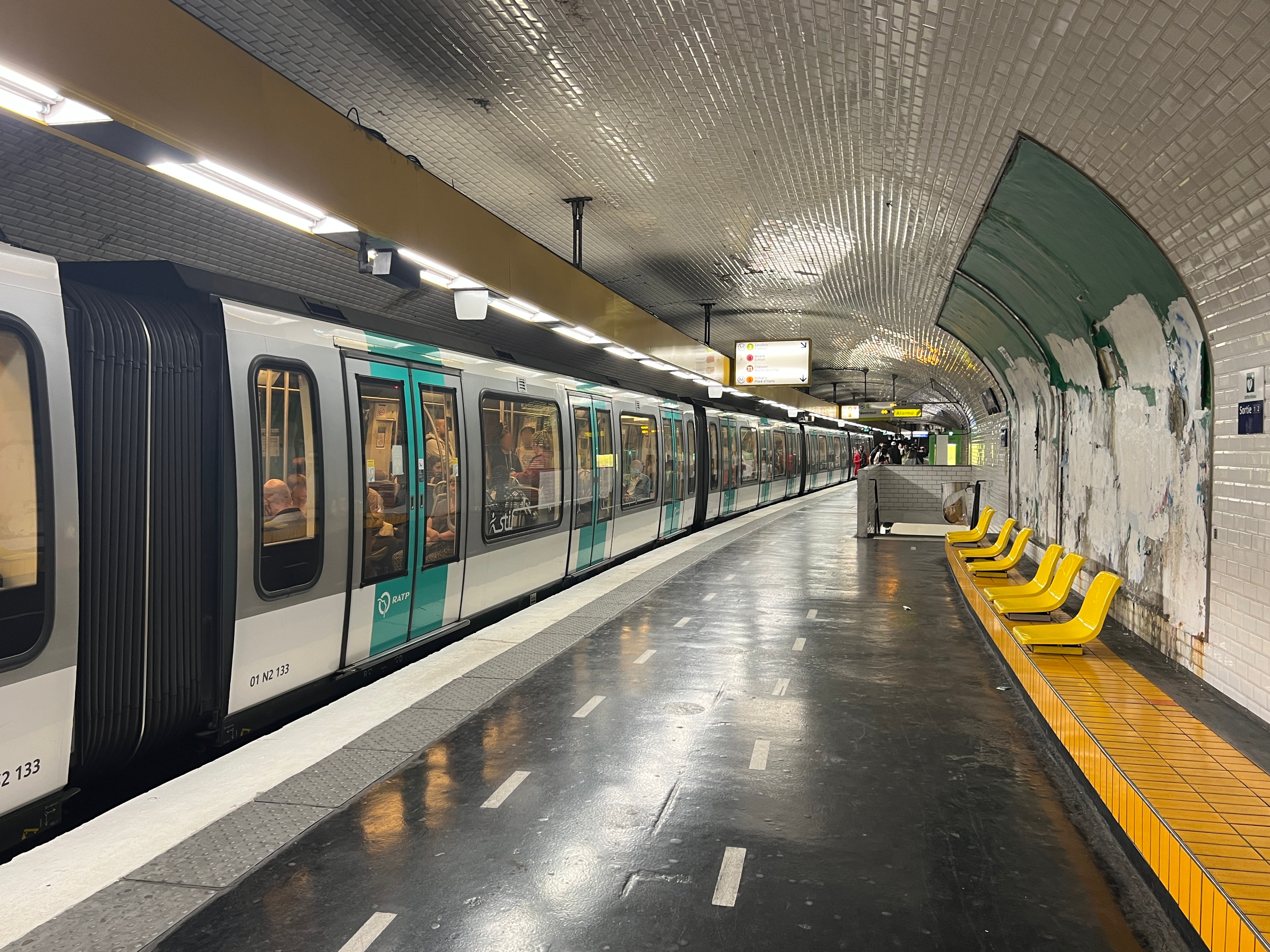
MF 01 rolling stock on Line 9

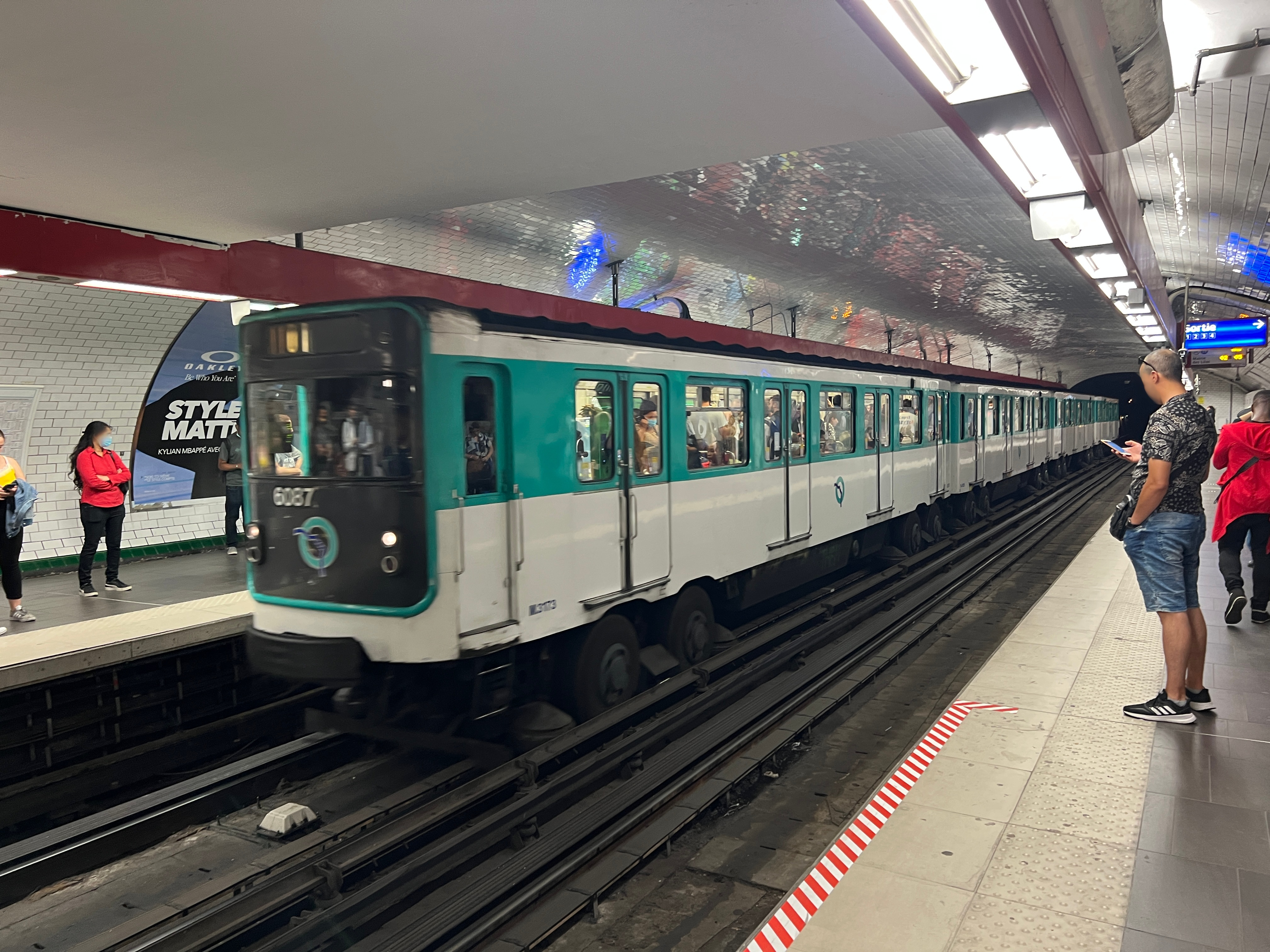
Line 11 platforms at République
