= List of Parisian structures commissioned by Napoleon I =

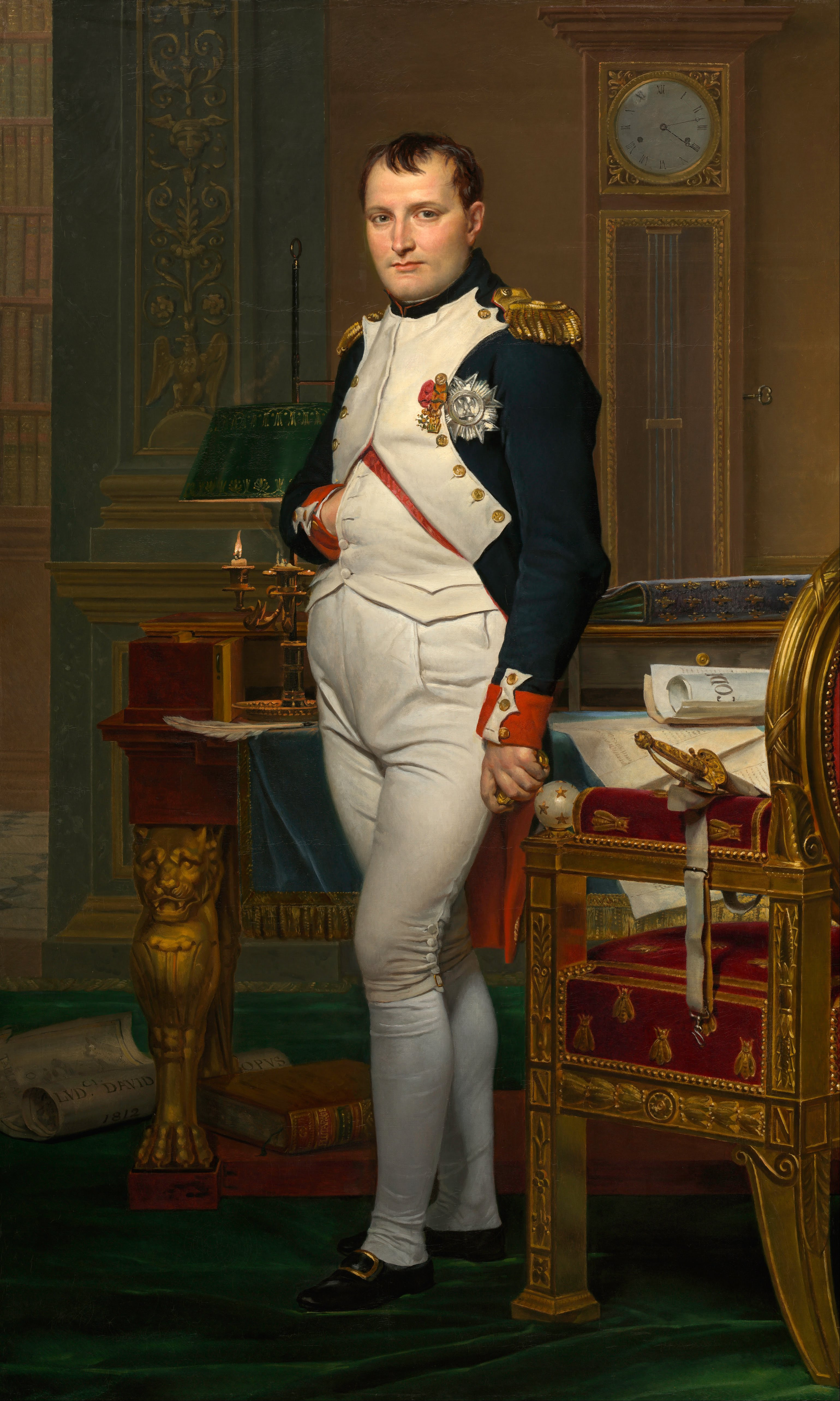
The Emperor Napoleon in His Study at the Tuileries (1812).

Napoleon I (Emperor from 1804–1814 and briefly in 1815) launched an ambitious program to transform Paris into an imperial capital inspired by ancient Rome. Many of the monuments he commissioned still define the city today. The architectural legacy of Napoleon I in Paris has been remarkably durable. Of the major monuments he commissioned, nearly all still stand – the Arc de Triomphe du Carrousel; the Vendôme Column; the Pont des Arts; the Pont d’Iéna; La Madeleine church; the Fontaine du Palmier; the Canal de l’Ourcq; and the Bassin de la Villette. Many of these structures subsequently underwent significant alterations.

== Triumphal monuments ==
- Arc de Triomphe. The Arc was commissioned in 1806, after the victory at Austerlitz, by Napoleon I, who was then at the peak of his fortunes. Laying the foundations alone took two years and, in 1810, when Napoleon entered Paris from the west with his new bride, Archduchess Marie-Louise of Austria, he had a wooden mock-up of the completed arch constructed. The architect, Jean-François Chalgrin, died in 1811 and the work was taken over by Louis-Robert Goust. It was completed in 1836 under Louis-Philippe I.
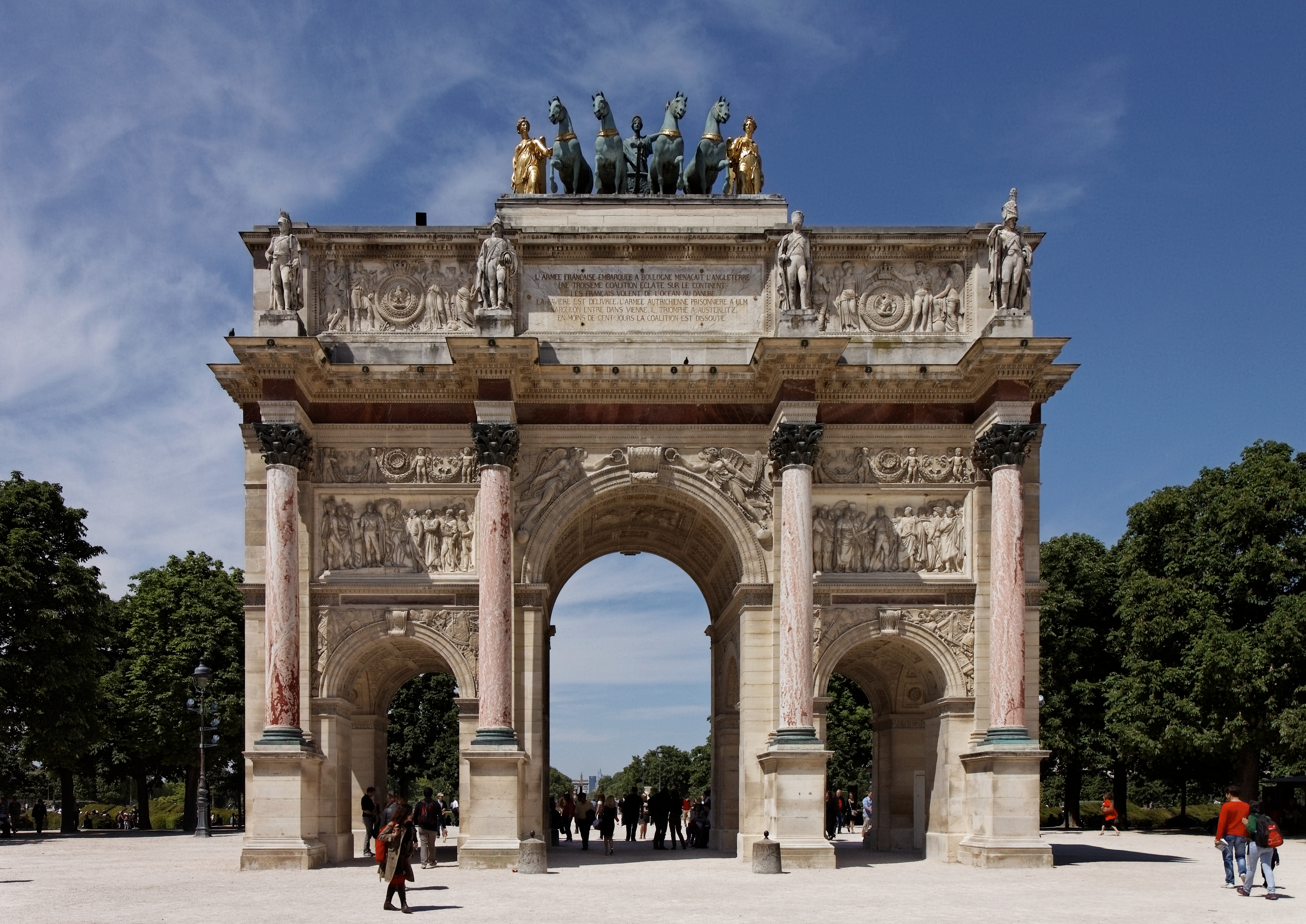
- The eastern façade of the Arc de Triomphe du Carrousel
  Arc de Triomphe du Carrousel. Designed by Charles Percier and Pierre Fontaine, the arch was built between 1806 and 1808, based on the model of the Arch of Constantine (312 AD) in Rome. It celebrates Napoleon’s victory at Austerlitz. At the time, it served as a gateway to the Tuileries Palace, the Imperial residence. The destruction of the Tuileries Palace during the Paris Commune in 1871, allowed an unobstructed view west towards the Arc de Triomphe. It is one of the few Napoleonic monuments completed during his reign, though it subsequently underwent major renovations.
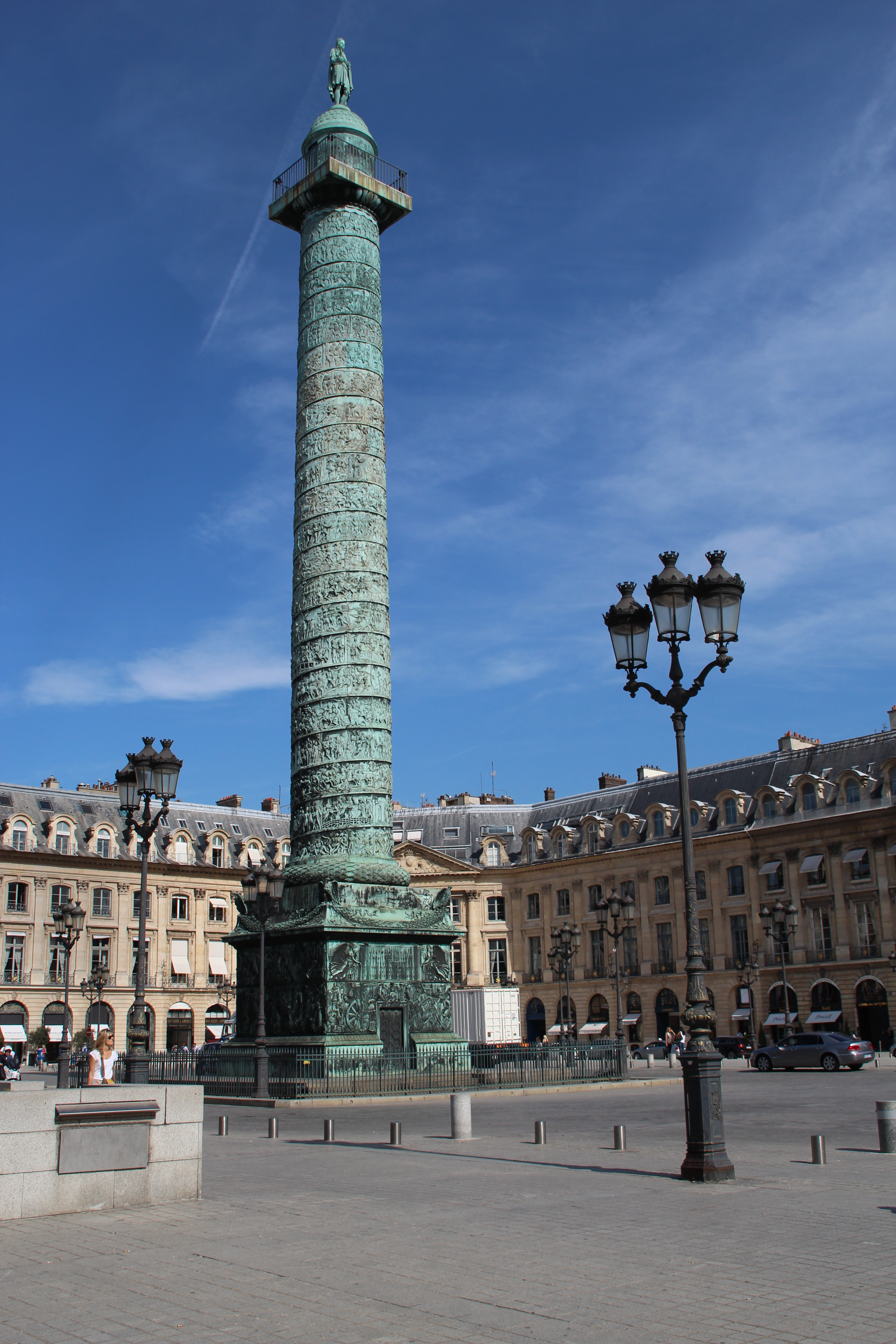
- The Vendôme Column
  Vendôme Column. Construction of the original column was started in 1806 under Napoleon's direction and completed in 1810. It was modelled after Trajan's Column in Rome, to celebrate the victory of Austerlitz; its veneer of 425 spiralling bas-relief bronze plates was made out of cannon taken from the combined armies of Europe, according to Napoleon’s propaganda. These plates were designed by the sculptor Pierre-Nolasque Bergeret and executed by a team of about 30 sculptors. Napoleon is depicted at the top of the column, dressed in Roman attire, bare-headed, crowned with laurels, holding a sword in his right hand and a globe surmounted with a statue of Victory in his left hand.

== Bridges ==
- Pont d’Iéna. Napoleon had a bridge built by a decree issued in Warsaw in 1807, naming it after his victory against Prussia in the Battle of Jena. Unusually, the bridge was financed entirely by the state and, therefore, there was no toll for crossing. In 1815, after the downfall of Napoleon, the Prussians wanted to destroy the bridge. The structure was ultimately saved and renamed, but the eagles that decorated it were removed. It would not regain its original name until 1830 and decorations until 1852.
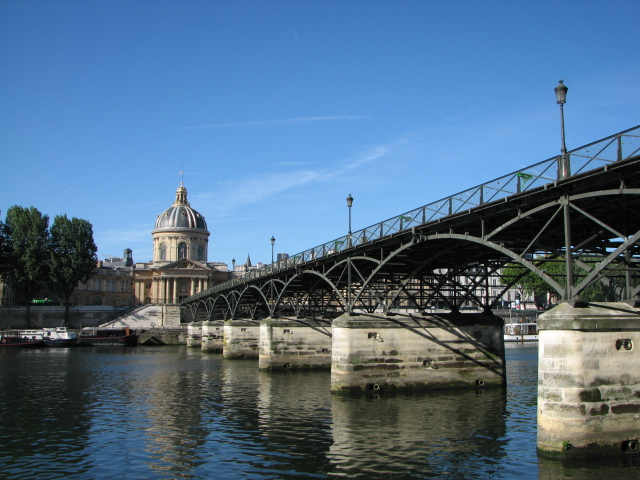
- Pont des Arts seen from the right bank of the Seine with the Institut de France in the background
  Pont des Arts. Between 1802 and 1804, a nine-arch metallic pedestrian bridge was built at the location of the present-day Pont des Arts. Commissioned by Napoleon, this was the first metal bridge in Paris. The engineers Louis-Alexandre de Cessart and Jacques Dillon had initially conceived of a bridge that would resemble a suspended garden, with trees, banks of flowers, and benches. Passage across the bridge at that time cost one sou.
- Pont d’Austerlitz. This bridge connects the Faubourg Saint-Antoine on the Right Bank to the Jardin des Plantes on the Left Bank. The idea of such a bridge had already been put forward by Beaumarchais, who had built his residence near the Bastille. In 1801, the engineer Becquey-Beaupré proposed a design for a bridge, which was built between 1802 and 1807. This structure consisted of five cast-iron arches with a span of 32 meters, supported by four piers and two masonry abutments. In 1854, the bridge was deemed dangerous. It was rebuilt in stone in 1855 and decorated with motifs including the names of the main officers killed at the Battle of Austerlitz.

== Churches and public buildings ==
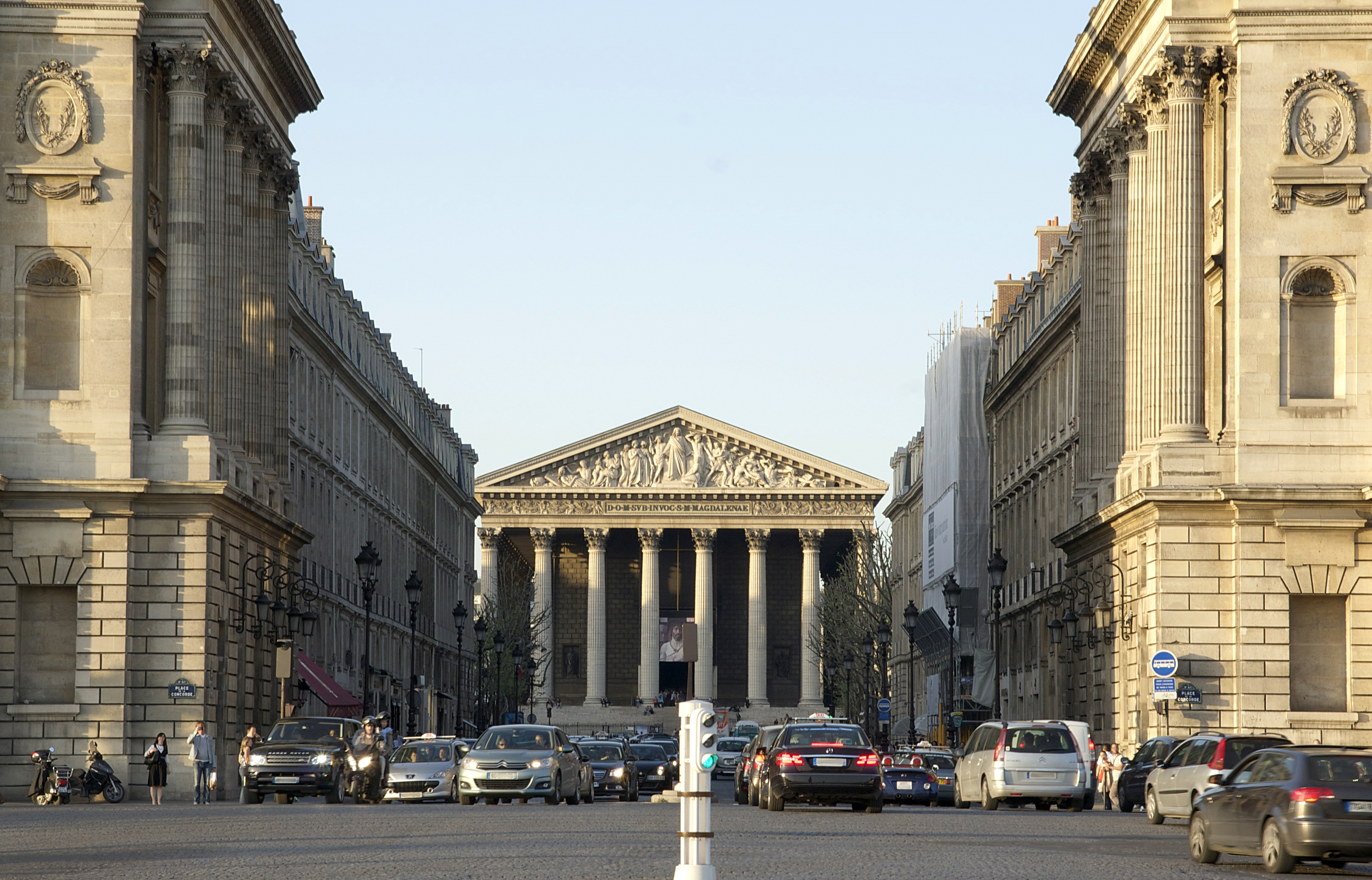
- La Madeleine church seen from the place de la Concorde
  La Madeleine. An earlier church of Saint-Marie-Madeleine was built in the 13th century, but it was considered too small for the growing neighbourhood in the 18th and early 19th centuries. Work had already begun on a replacement church, but was halted by the French Revolution. In 1806 Napoleon restarted work on the church, declaring that it would become a "Temple to the Glory of the Grand Army". While on a military campaign in Poland, he personally chose the design of a new architect, Pierre-Alexandre Vignon, over the design that was recommended to him by the Academy of Architecture. The plan of Vignon took the form of a classical temple with Corinthian columns on all four sides. The work began anew, with new foundations but preserving the classical columns that had already been raised. Construction was not completed before Napoleon's fall from power and the church was ultimately inaugurated on 24 July 1842.
- Palais Brongniart (the Paris Stock Exchange). The Bourse (or Stock Echange) was commissioned by Napoleon, but completed after his reign. In 1807, Napoleon chose the Alexandre-Théodore Brongniart (1739-1813) as the architect for the Paris Stock Exchange. With this Commission, Napoleon sought to improve the functioning of the country's economy by centralizing all stock exchanges in Paris. The foundation stone of the building was laid on March 24, 1808. Brongniart did not live to see his work completed – he died prematurely on June 6, 1813. Éloi Labarre (1764-1833) succeeded Brongniart and completed the building in November 1825.
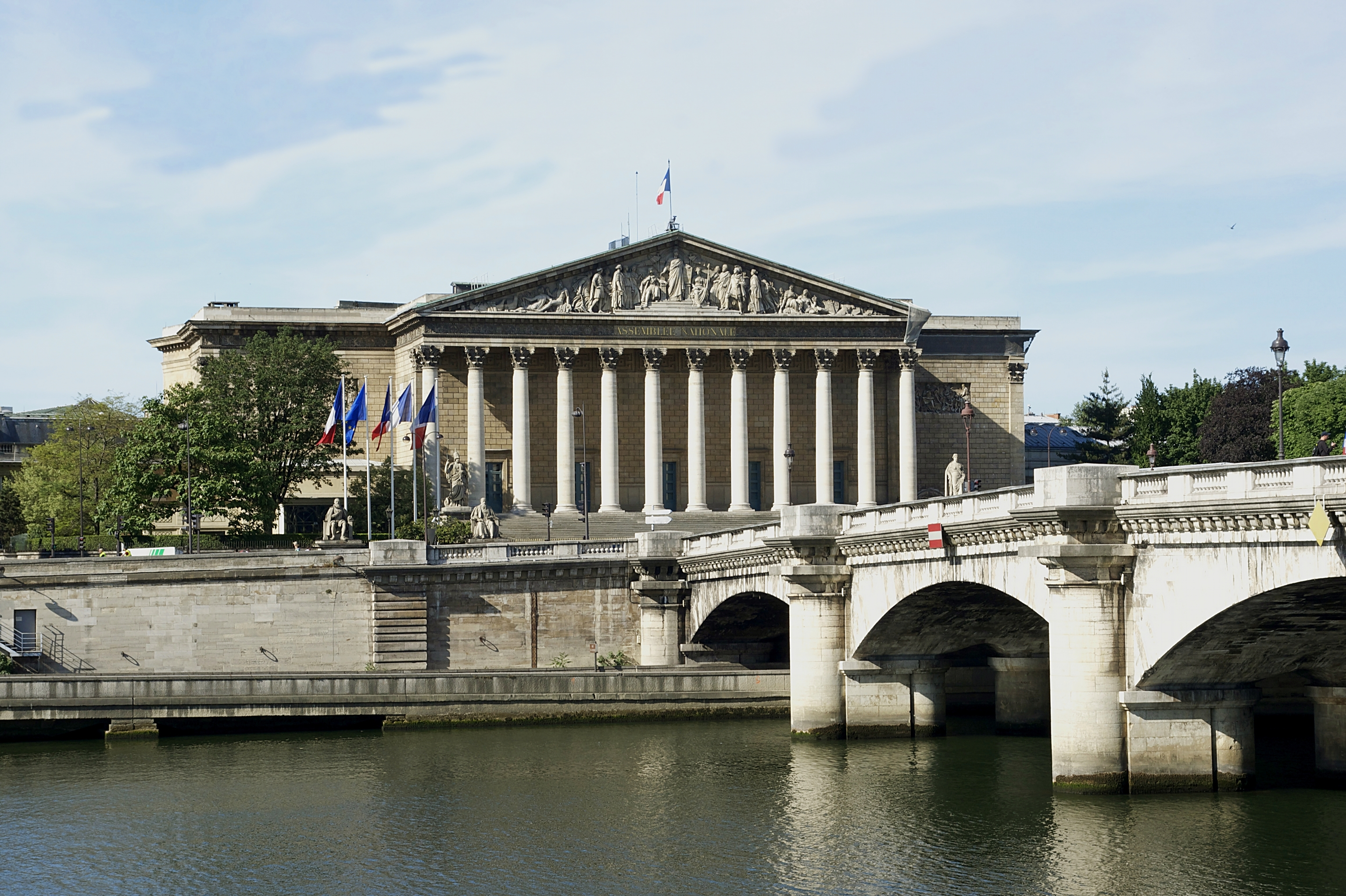
- The classical portico added to the Palais Bourbon by Napoleon. The portico mirrors that of the church of La Madeleine.
  Façade of the Palais Bourbon. Napoleon had the Palais remodeled with the monumental classical façade facing the Seine. In 1806, a new façade was to be aligned with and would match that of the Temple of to the Glory of the Grande Armée (now the Église de la Madeleine) which Napoleon was building at the end of Rue Royale, to the north of the Place de la Concorde. The new façade, designed by architect Bernard Poyet, had twelve corinthian columns in an entirely different style from the Italianate 18th century palace behind it, but it was high enough to be visible from the Place de la Concorde and was correctly aligned to be on the sight lines from the Madeleine. The original frontonof the façade featured bas-reliefs by sculptor Antoine-Denis Chaudet, showed scenes from the opening of the Corps législatif in 1806; it showed Napoleon on horseback, offering to the members of the Legislature the flags which had been captured from the Austrians at the Battle of Austerlitz, and the inscription, 'To Napoleon I the Great – the Corps législatif'. After the fall of Napoleon in 1814, the House of Bourbon was restored under Louis XVIII. In July 1815, just a month after Napoleon's final defeat at Waterloo, the new government erased the inscription to Napoleon, the five bas-reliefs and the numerous Ns and eagles that had been carved on the façades.
- Palais de Justice, Paris. As with many other buildings, the Palais was modernized under Napoleon, but was altered by subsequent governments.

== Water supply and fountains ==
Napoleon invested heavily in improving Paris’s water supply and in facilitating commercial barge transport.

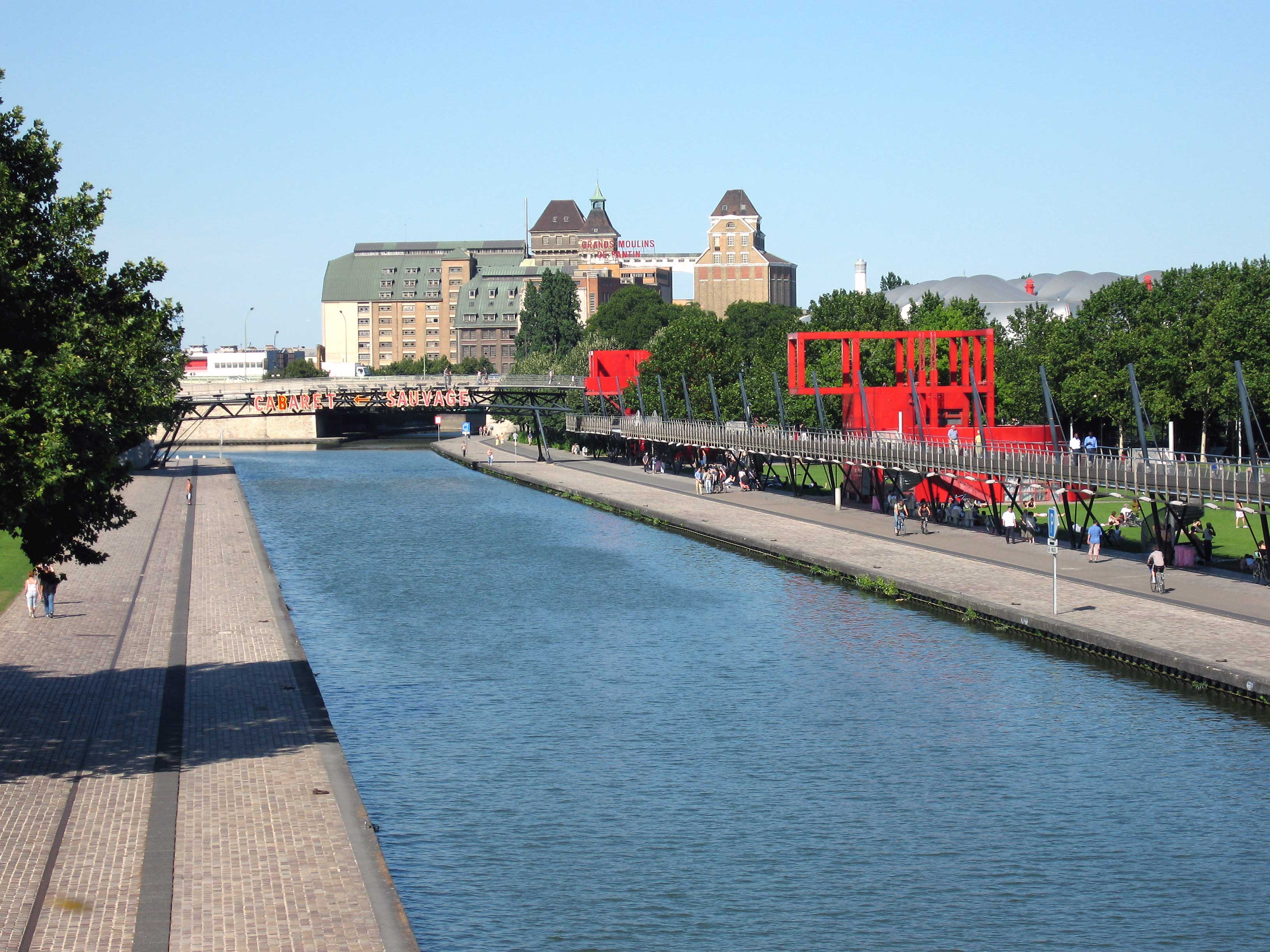
- The Canal de l'Ourcq as seen from the Parc de la Villette. In the background are the Grands Moulins de Pantin
  Canal de l’Ourcq. This was one of Napoleon’s largest civil engineering projects. On 19 May 1802, Napoleon ordered the creation of the canal. Specifically, Napoleon directed that the Seine be diverted from below the Bassin de l'Arsenal to the Bassin de la Villette. The canals were to have the dual purposes of providing shipping channels and bringing water to Paris. Funding was secured via a grant and supplemental wine taxes, and the first stone was laid on 23 September. Napoleon appointed Pierre-Simon Girard to direct the project and work began in January 1804. The design of the canal embodied a plan in which the water was both slow moving, to aid navigation, and non-stagnant, in order to provide healthy drinking water. The canal was also intended to feed the Canal Saint-Martin and Canal Saint-Denis. The projected confluence would enable easier navigation through the city centre, as the Seine was not yet dammed, and the canal would provide an alternative shipping option to the Seine. Private financiers were awarded the contract to construct and manage the canals. The city of Paris agreed to purchase land and surrender tolls for 99 years to the firms building the canals (the cost of construction was estimated at 6 million francs). Work began in 1805 under Édouard de Villiers du Terrage. The bassin de la Villette was filled with water on 2 December 1808, and on 15 August 1813 the first boat traveled through the canal. Construction continued after Napoleon’s reign.
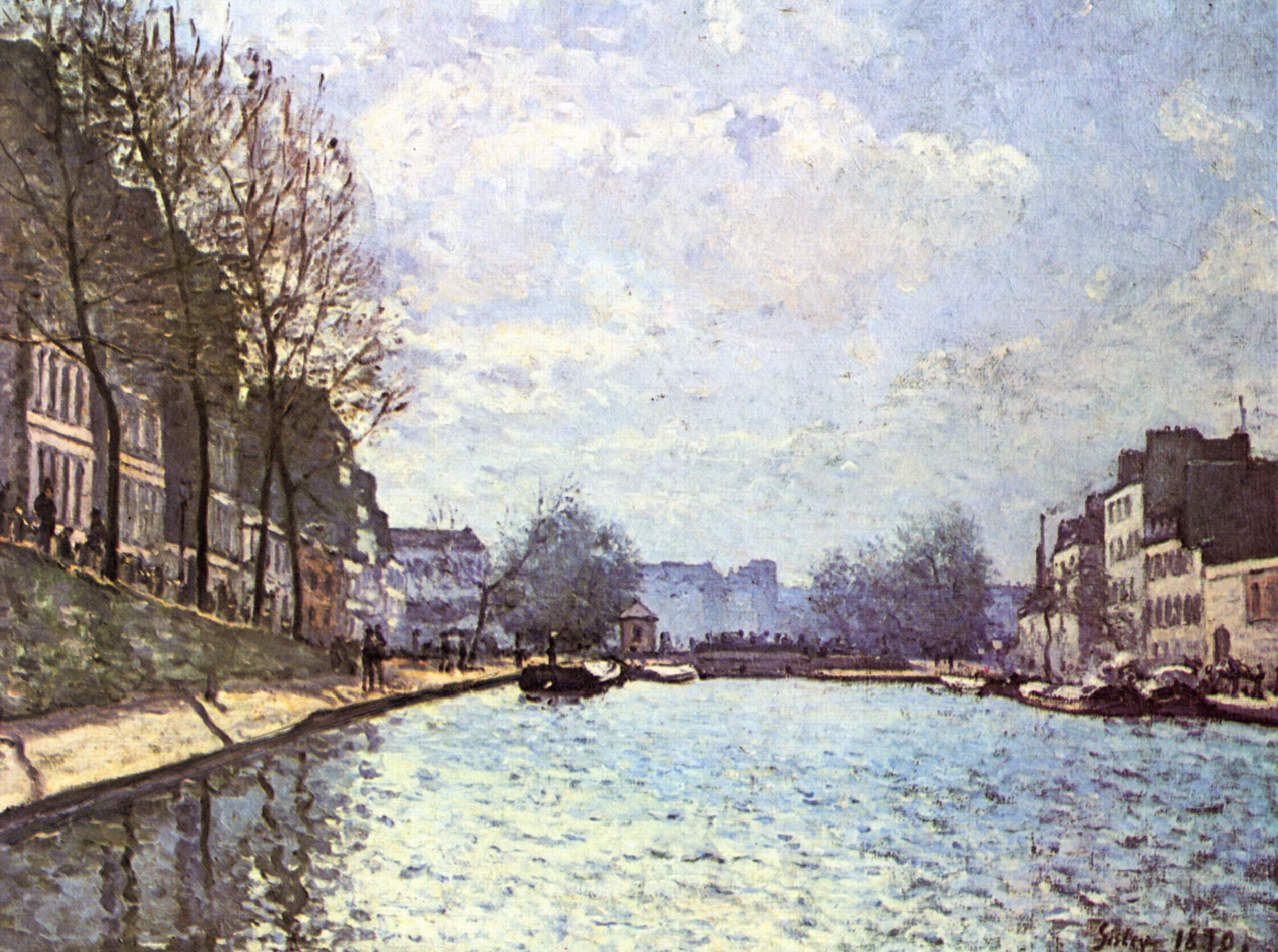
- View of the Canal Saint-Martin (Alfred Sisley, Orsay Museum, 1870)
  Canal Saint-Martin. Construction of the canal was ordered by Napoleon in 1802 and construction took place until 1825, funded by a new tax on wine. In addition to providing water for the Paris population, the canal provided a means of fluvial transport that supplied Paris with grain, building materials and other goods, carried on canal boats. Two ports were created on the canal in Paris to unload the boats: Port de l'Arsenal and the Bassin de la Villette.
- Canal Saint-Denis. This canal is part of the Parisian canal network ordered by Napoleon on 19 May 1802. The canal would continue through Saint-Denis to rejoin the Seine in order to avoid having a shipping canal pass through the center of Paris. Additionally, the new canal would expedite navigation by avoiding the Seine's meandering turns. After the downfall of Napoleon, in May 1821, the canal opened, having expended less than its allotted budget.
- Fontaine du Palmier. This water source was one of a series of fifteen fountains commissioned by Napoleon in 1806. It was designed by the engineer François-Jean Bralle, who was in charge of the Paris fountains and water supply during the First Empire. It was finished in 1808. The fontain’s column, which commemorates Napoleon's Egyptian Campaign and is modeled after a Roman triumphal column, takes its name from the sculpted palm leaves at the top. The bands of bronze on the column pay tribute to Napoleon's victories at the siege of Danzig (1807), the Battle of Ulm (1805), the Battle of Marengo (1800), the Battle of the Pyramids (1798), and the Battle of Lodi (1796). The statue is the work of the sculptor Louis-Simon Boizot. The present statue is a copy; the original is in the courtyard of the Carnavalet Museum.

== Roads and urban improvements ==
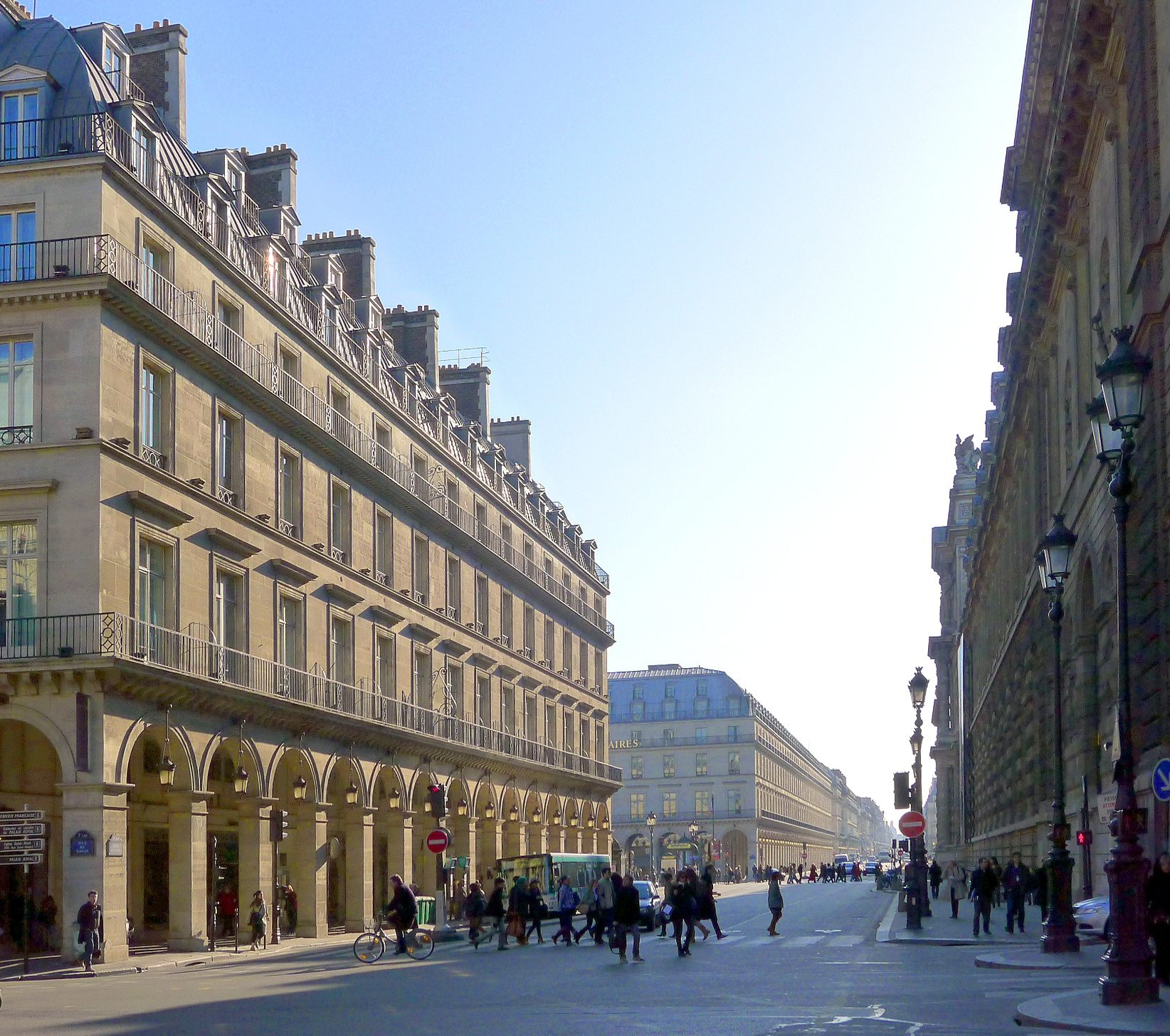
Rue de Rivoli at the level of the Louvre (on the right)

Napoleon also ordered:

- The construction of the Rue de Rivoli (the first section dates from the Empire).
- Expansion of quays along the Seine.
- New embankments.
- Markets and slaughterhouses.
- Tree-lined avenues in several districts.
- Improved street lighting and paving.

== See also ==
- List of French monarchs
- Architecture of Paris
- List of monuments historiques in Paris
- Neoclassicism in France
