= Boulevard de la Bastille =

Boulevard in Paris, France

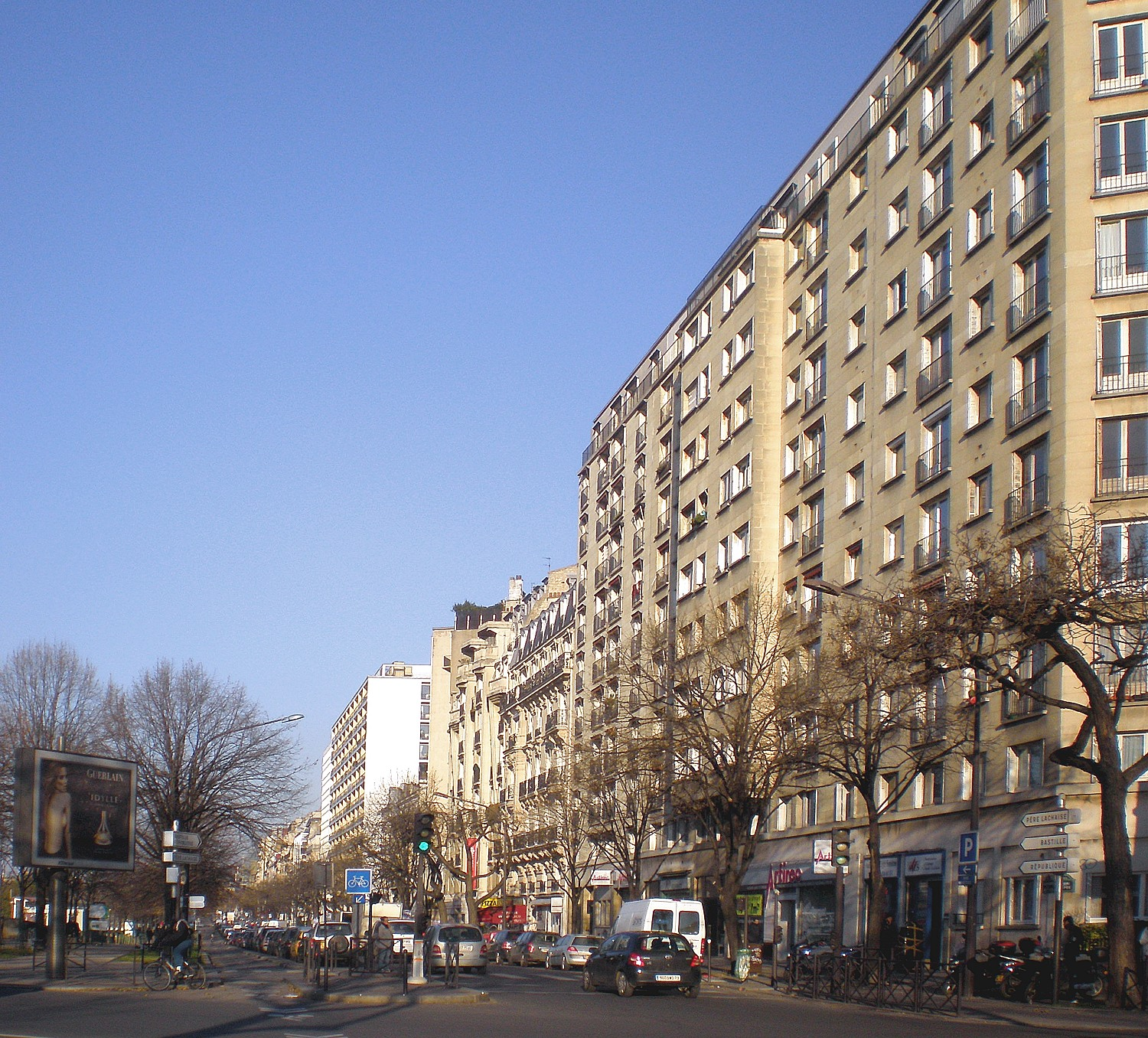
- Boulevard de la Bastille looking towards the Place de la Bastille

- Location within Paris
- Length: 635 m (2,083 ft)
- Width: 31 m (102 ft)
- Arrondissement: 12th
- Quarter: Quinze-Vingts
- Coordinates: 48°50′56″N 2°22′05″E
- From: Place Mazas and 102 Quai de la Rapée
- To: Place de la Bastille and 75 rue de Lyon

Construction
- Completed: 1898
- Denomination: 1898

The Boulevard de la Bastille (French pronunciation: [bulvaʁ də la bastij]) is the southwesternmost street of the 12th arrondissement of Paris, situated in the quartier called Quinze-Vingts. It overlooks the east side of the Paris marina, known as the Port de Plaisance or Port de l'Arsenal, with which it forms a boundary with the 4th arrondissement of Paris. (The Port de l'Arsenal is in fact the terminus of the Canal Saint-Martin, which begins at the Place de Stalingrad.) The boulevard also lies directly north (across the Seine) of the border between the 5th arrondissement and the 13th arrondissement of Paris.

== Description ==
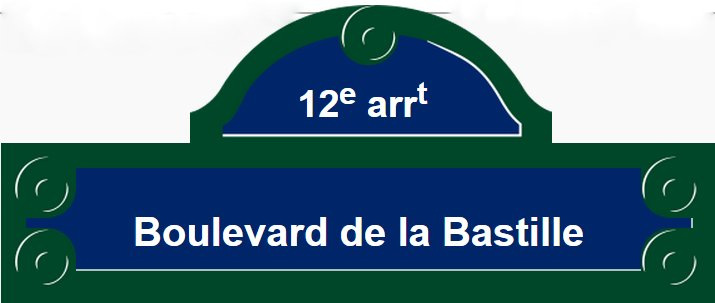

With a total length of 705 meters (2,313 ft), the boulevard starts at the juncture of Pont Morland (Morland Bridge, which covers the lock separating the Canal Saint-Martin from the river Seine) and the boulevard Quai de la Rapée. It ends at the Place de la Bastille, home of the Opéra Bastille.

The boulevard was given its current name of Boulevard de la Bastille in 1898, due to its contiguity to the Place de la Bastille. Formerly it was known as the Rue de la Contrescarpe.

== Métro Stations ==
The boulevard is home to 26 apartment buildings and is bounded by two Métro stations: at its beginning by the Quai de la Rapée station serving line, and at its end by the Bastille station, serving lines.

== Notable Sites ==
- The boulevard overlooks the part of the Canal Saint-Martin known as the Port de l'Arsenal (or Paris marina). A garden stretches along the area between the boulevard and the canal, which also contains a small children's playground, a restaurant ("Le Grand Bleu") and a pitch for the game of boules.
- At number 10, the contemporary museum La Maison Rouge (Fondation Antoine-de-Galbert). [Closed on 28 October 2018]
- At number 52, the building known as Immeuble de l'îlot Biscornet.

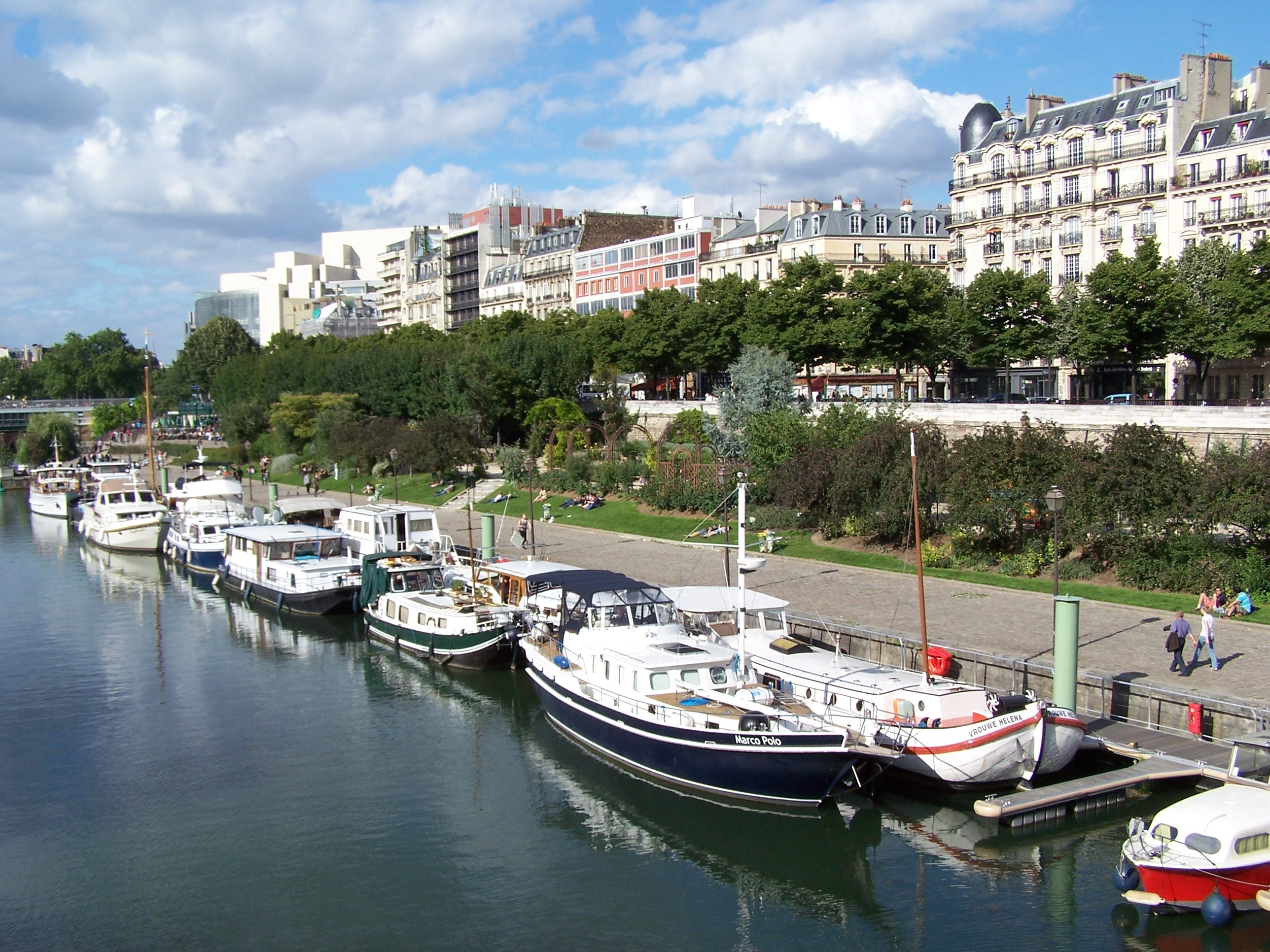
The Paris Marina (Port de l'Arsenal) with the Boulevard de la Bastille above it.

== See also ==
- Bassin de l'Arsenal
- Bastille
