= Canal Saint-Denis =

Canal in northeastern France

Coordinates: 48°54′N 2°23′E

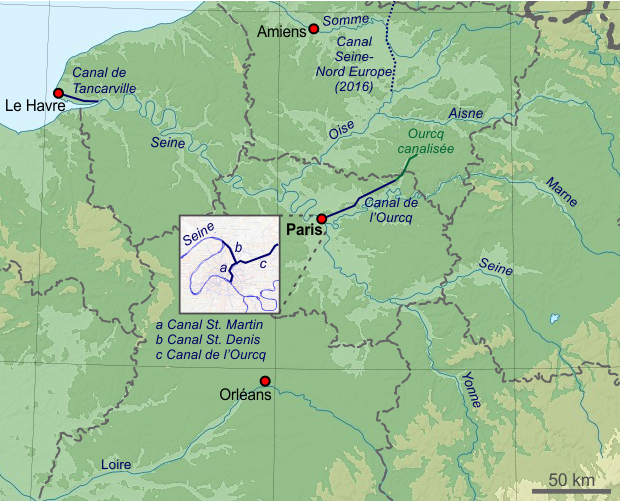
- Map of rivers and canals in and around Paris. The Canal Saint Denis is marked in the inset.
- Interactive map of Canal Saint-Denis

Specifications
- Length: 6.6 km (4.1 mi)
- Maximum boat beam: 8 metres (26 ft)
- Maximum boat draft: 2.6 metres (8.5 ft)
- Minimum boat air draft: 4.4 metres (14 ft)
- Locks: 7 (originally 12)

History
- Date approved: 1802
- Date completed: 1821

Geography
- Start point: Bassin de la Villette
- Connects to: Canal de l'Ourcq

The Canal Saint-Denis (French pronunciation: [kanal sɛ̃ dəni]) is a 6.5-kilometre-long (4.0 mi) canal in Paris, France. The canal connects the Canal de l'Ourcq, at a point north-northwest of the Bassin de la Villette in the 19th arrondissement, with the suburban municipalities of Saint-Denis and Aubervilliers in the department of Seine-Saint-Denis. There are seven locks along the canal's route, and, near Saint-Denis, the canal discharges into the Seine.

In 1802 Napoléon Bonaparte issued a decree for the construction of the canal to both expedite shipping and reduce the number of ships and barges sailing up and down the Seine through the center of Paris. Contracts to build and operate the canals in the Île-de-France were granted to private banking firms. These contracts required the city of Paris to purchase land, and the merchant-bankers who won the contracts, Roman Vassal, Lafitte, André, and Cottier, were expected to construct the waterways. As compensation for their large outlays, the bankers were permitted to collect tolls on the canal for a term of ninety-nine years. The canal was completed in 1821.

The canal is part of the Réseau des Canaux Parisiens (Parisian Canal Network), a public-works authority operated by the city. The other components of the network are the Canal de l'Ourcq, the Bassin de la Villette, the Canal Saint-Martin, and the Bassin de l'Arsenal. Together, these canals and basins extend over a distance of 121 kilometres (75 mi).

== History ==
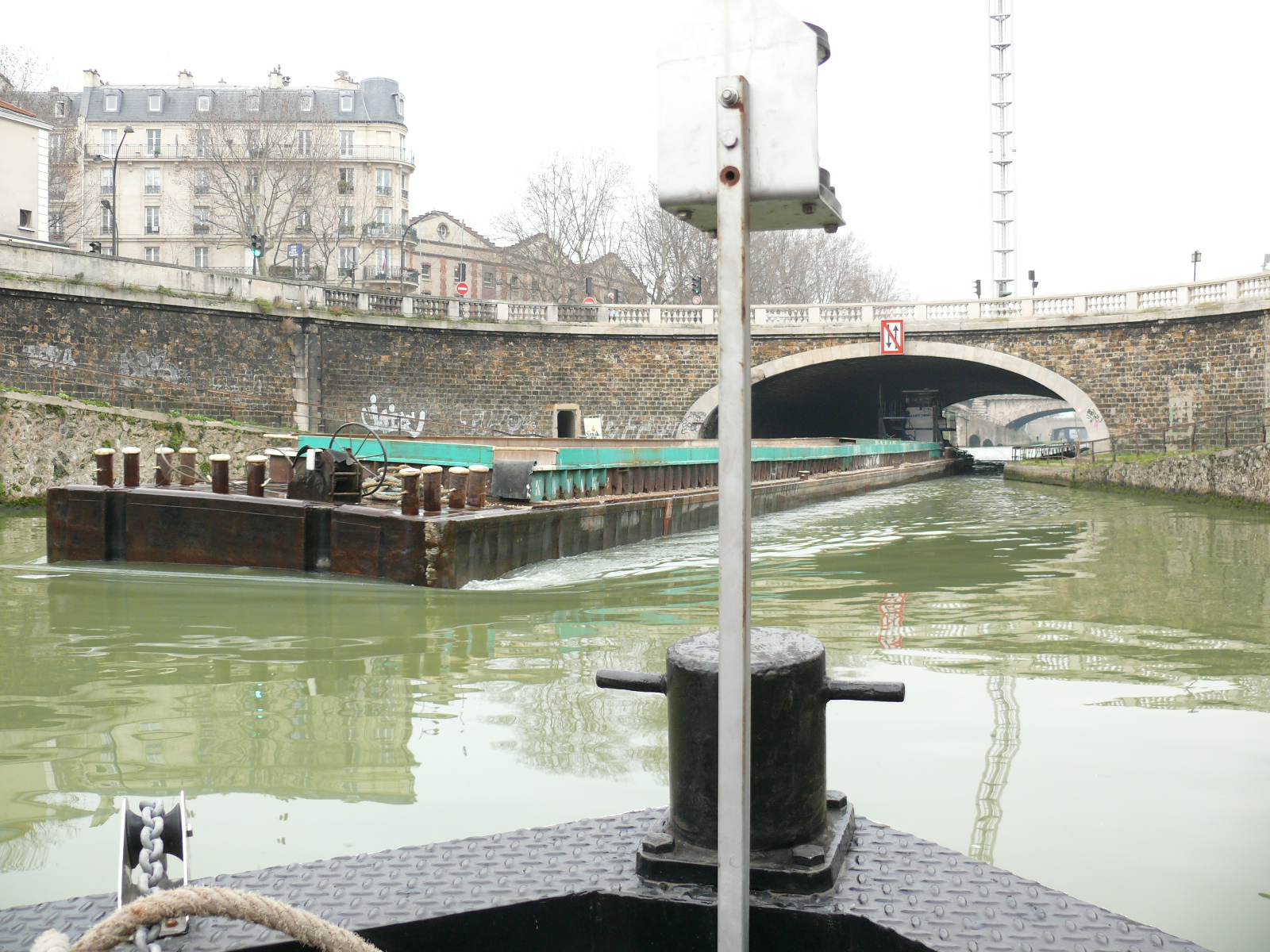
A barge under the Pont de Flandre in Paris

Napoléon Bonaparte ordered the creation of a Parisian canal network on May 19, 1802. Specifically, he decreed that the Seine be diverted from below the Bassin de l'Arsenal to the Bassin de la Villette. The canal would continue through Saint-Denis to rejoin the Seine in order to avoid having a shipping canal pass through the center of Paris. Additionally, the new canal would expedite navigation by avoiding the Seine's meandering turns.

Private financiers were awarded the contracts to construct and manage the canals. The city of Paris agreed to purchase the land and surrender the tolls for 99 years in order that the firms build the canals. (The cost of construction was estimated at 6 million francs.) Work began in 1805 under Édouard de Villiers du Terrage. In May 1821, the canal opened, having expended less than its allotted budget. At its creation, the canal had twelve locks with an overall change in level of 28.34 metres (93.0 ft).

Between 1890 and 1895, the canal was reconstructed and enlarged in order to permit the passage of wider-beamed barges, and the number of locks was reduced from twelve to eight. The first lock was named Écluse du Pont de Flandre ("Flanders Bridge Lock"), and it alone covered 10 metres (33 ft) of lift, replacing four of the older locks. In 2008, the canal was composed of seven locks.

Since 1983, the canal has been open to pleasure craft.

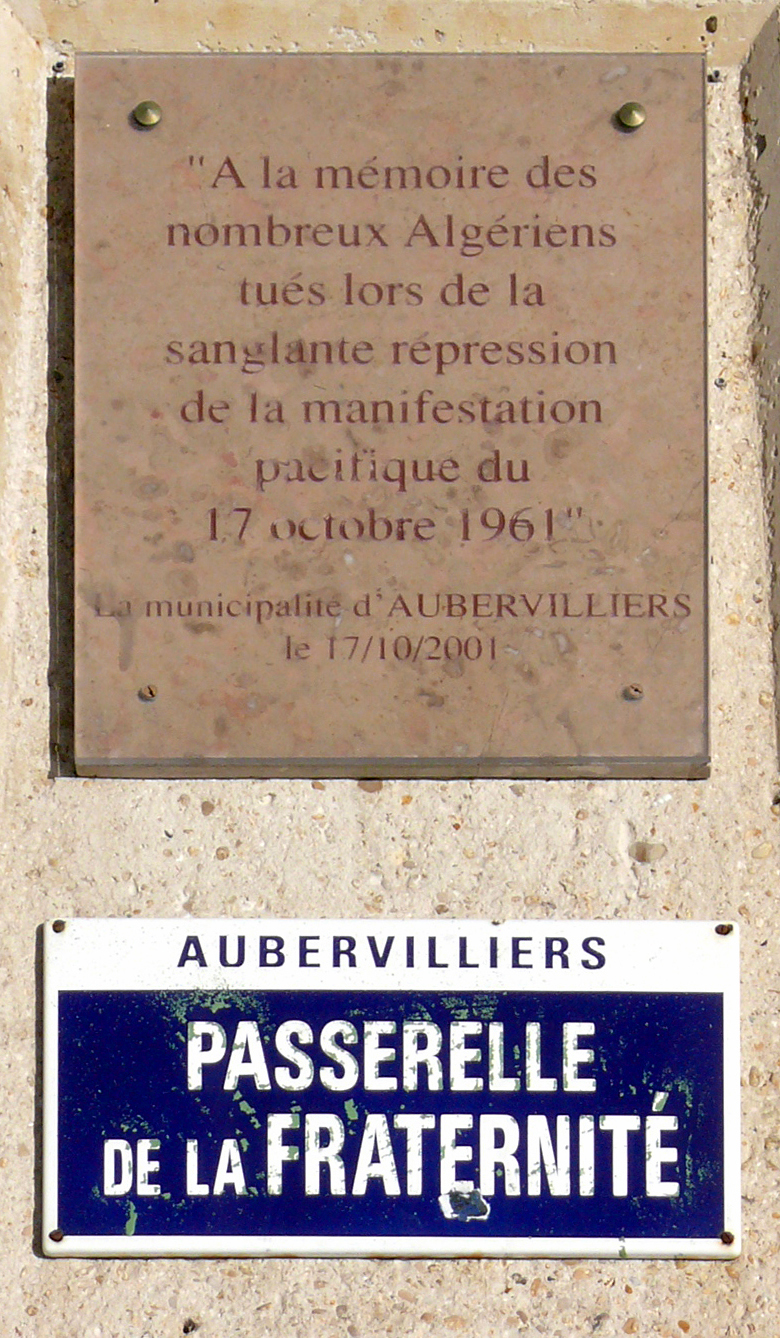
Memorial plaque commemorating the October 17, 1961 massacre of Algerians committed under the orders of Maurice Papon, chief of the Paris police. The plaque is located under a bridge in Aubervilliers.

== Technical specifications and navigation ==
The Canal Saint-Denis extends 6.6 km from the junction with the Canal de l’Ourcq at the Bassin de la Villette to the Seine at Saint-Denis. It is the busiest of the three canals in Paris, passing through predominantly industrial suburbs, with numerous private quays used by commercial barges.

The canal has an average width of 70 metres (230 ft), ranging from 30 metres (98 ft) to 140 metres (460 ft). The canal covers roughly 36 hectares of Parisian public space. The waterway is open 365 days a year and, together with the Canal de l'Ourcq and the Canal Saint-Martin, carries between 500,000 and 1 million tons of materials and merchandise per year. The depth of the canal varies from 3.2 metres (10 ft) to 3.5 metres (11 ft). This allows barges and other craft up to a maximum of 1,000 tons displacement. Vessels may travel the canal if their beam is less than 8 metres (26 ft), their air draft less than 4.4 metres (14 ft), and their draft less than 2.6 metres (8.5 ft). Launching slipways are located at the Pont de Stains in Aubervilliers (source Ville de Paris, Service des Canaux, within the Direction de la Voirie et de la Mobilité, quoted on the French page).

== Tourism and management ==
=== Management ===
A study by architect Michel Corajoud recognized the canal as a unifying element of the Parisian urban area, because the canal links Paris with Aubervilliers and Saint-Denis. It is a part of the Communauté de communes de la Plaine de France, a federation of communities organized to coordinate local projects.

Recently, the following improvements to the canal network have been undertaken:

- The creation and maintenance of a path from the Parc de la Villette to the Seine near Saint-Denis, which allows for the passage of bicycles, pedestrians, and rollerskaters. There are future plans for the route to become part of a proposed Paris-to-London bicycle path.
- The lighting of the thirteen bridges (carrying both roads and railways) that cross the canal.

Most of the plans, inaugurated at the Seine nautical festival in 2006, have been fulfilled. However, a 1.6 kilometres (0.99 mi) section remains to be finished, but was expected to be complete by 2012.

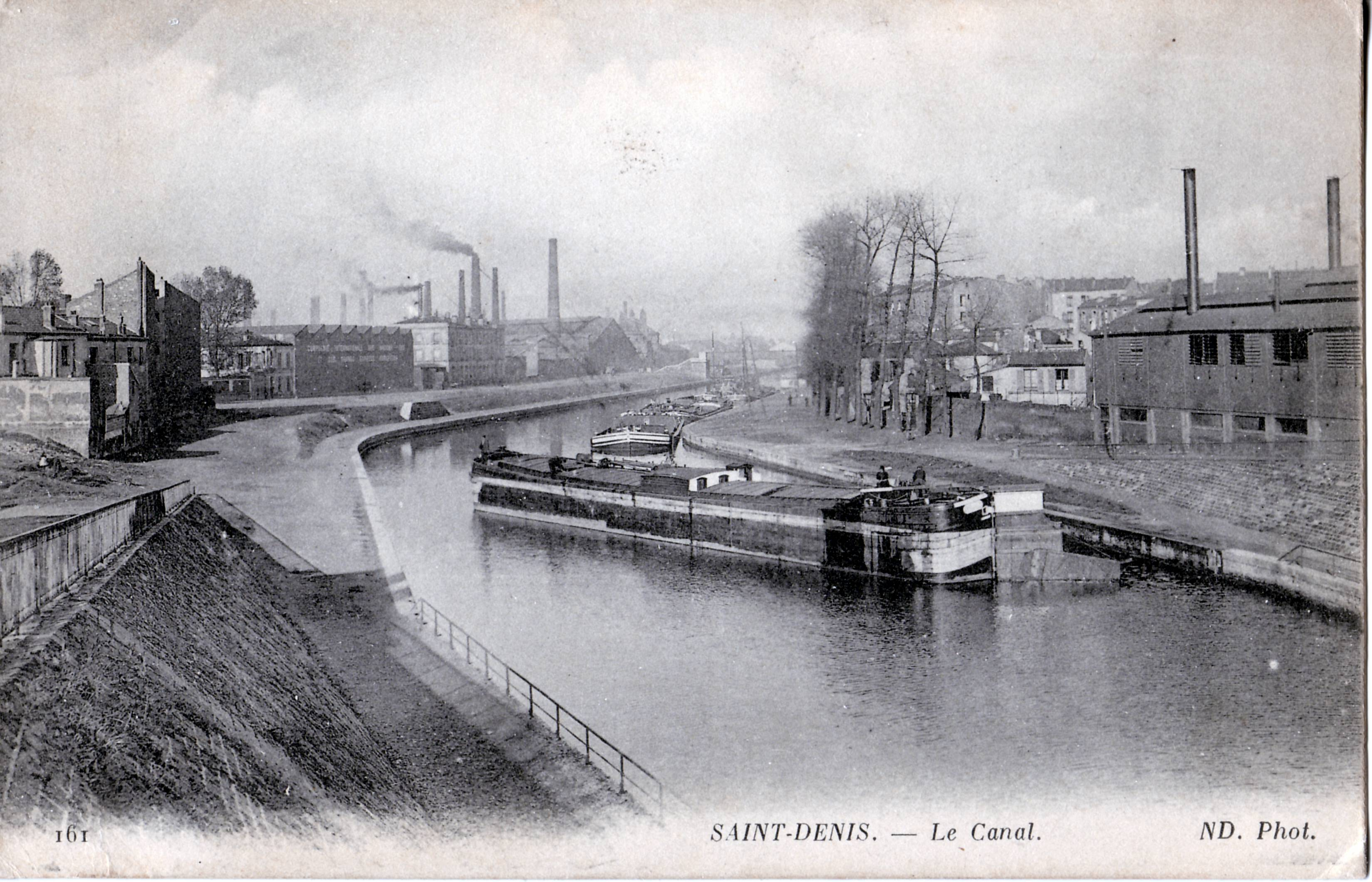
The Canal Saint-Denis in the town of Saint-Denis at the beginning of the 20th century.

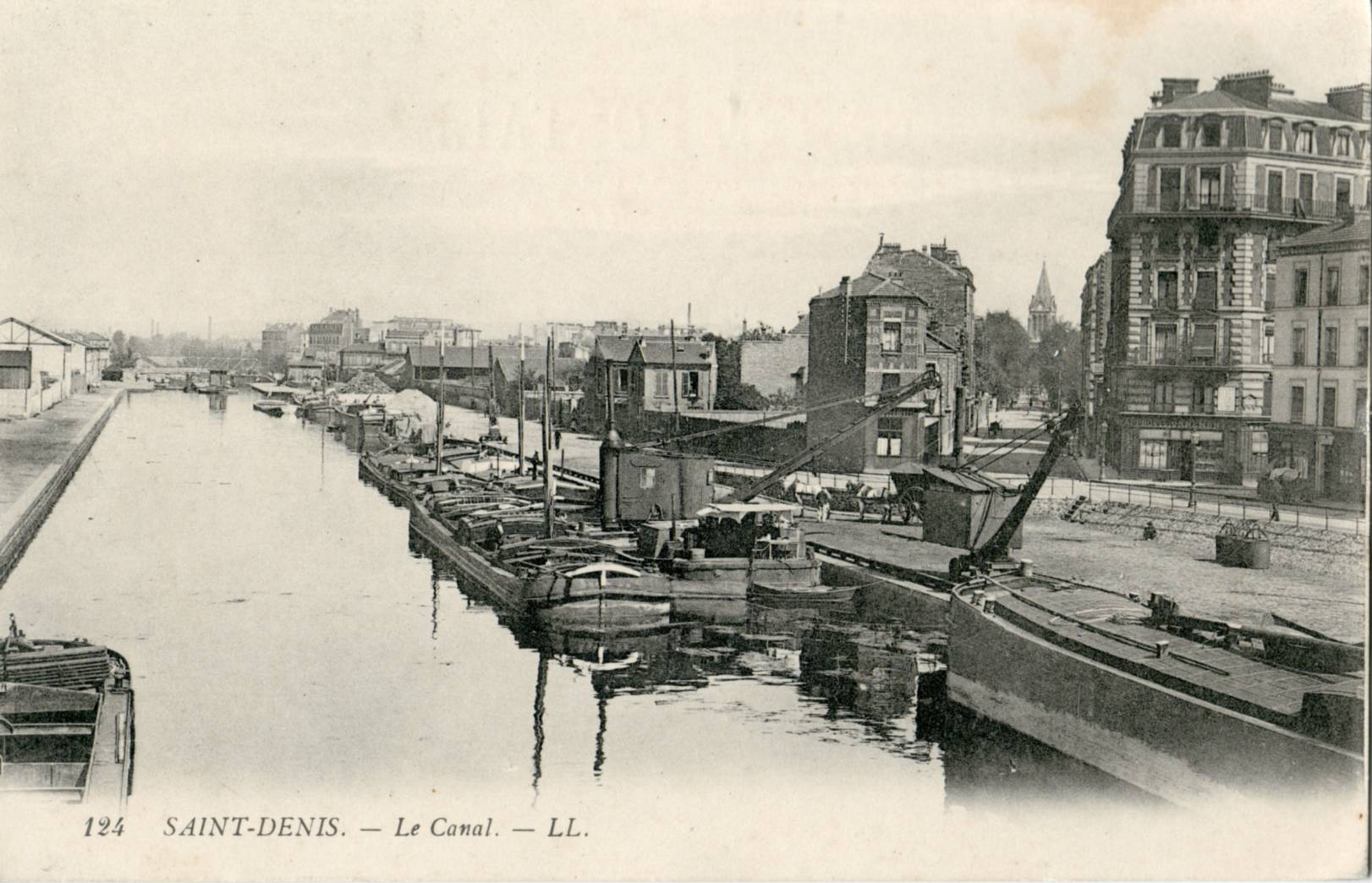
Postcard by Robert Doisneau (circa 1939) showing the port of Saint-Denis on the Canal Saint-Denis on the corner of rue Denfert-Rochereau

=== Points of interest ===
The canal passes by a number of places that may be of interest to tourists:

- Parc de la Villette
- Cité des Sciences et de l'Industrie
- Cité de la Musique
- Théâtre équestre Zingaro
- Académie Fratellini
- Basilique Saint-Denis
- Musée d'art et d'histoire de Saint-Denis
- Stade de France
- The Maison d'éducation de la Légion d'honneur, in the basements of the old Abbaye royale de Saint-Denis
- Le Musée de l’Orfèvrerie Bouilhet-Christofle
