= Louis-Robert Goust =

French architect

- Born: 8 June 1761; Beaumesnil
- Died: 11 July 1838 (aged 77)
- Occupation: Architect
- Awards: Prix de Rome (1786, 1788)
- Practice: Neoclassicism
- Buildings: Arc de Triomphe

Louis-Robert Goust (8 June 1761 – 11 July 1838) was a French architect.

== Biography ==
Born in Beaumesnil, he won the second Grand Prix for Architecture (the future Prix de Rome) in 1786 and 1788. On 1 May 1811 he was appointed architect for the construction of the Arc de Triomphe in Paris, replacing Jean-François Chalgrin, who had died five months earlier.

== Decorations ==
- Knight of the Legion of Honour (1826)

== See also ==
- Neoclassical architecture
- Empire style
