= Bassin de l'Arsenal =

Port in Paris, France

Coordinates: 48°50′58.11″N 02°22′02.52″E

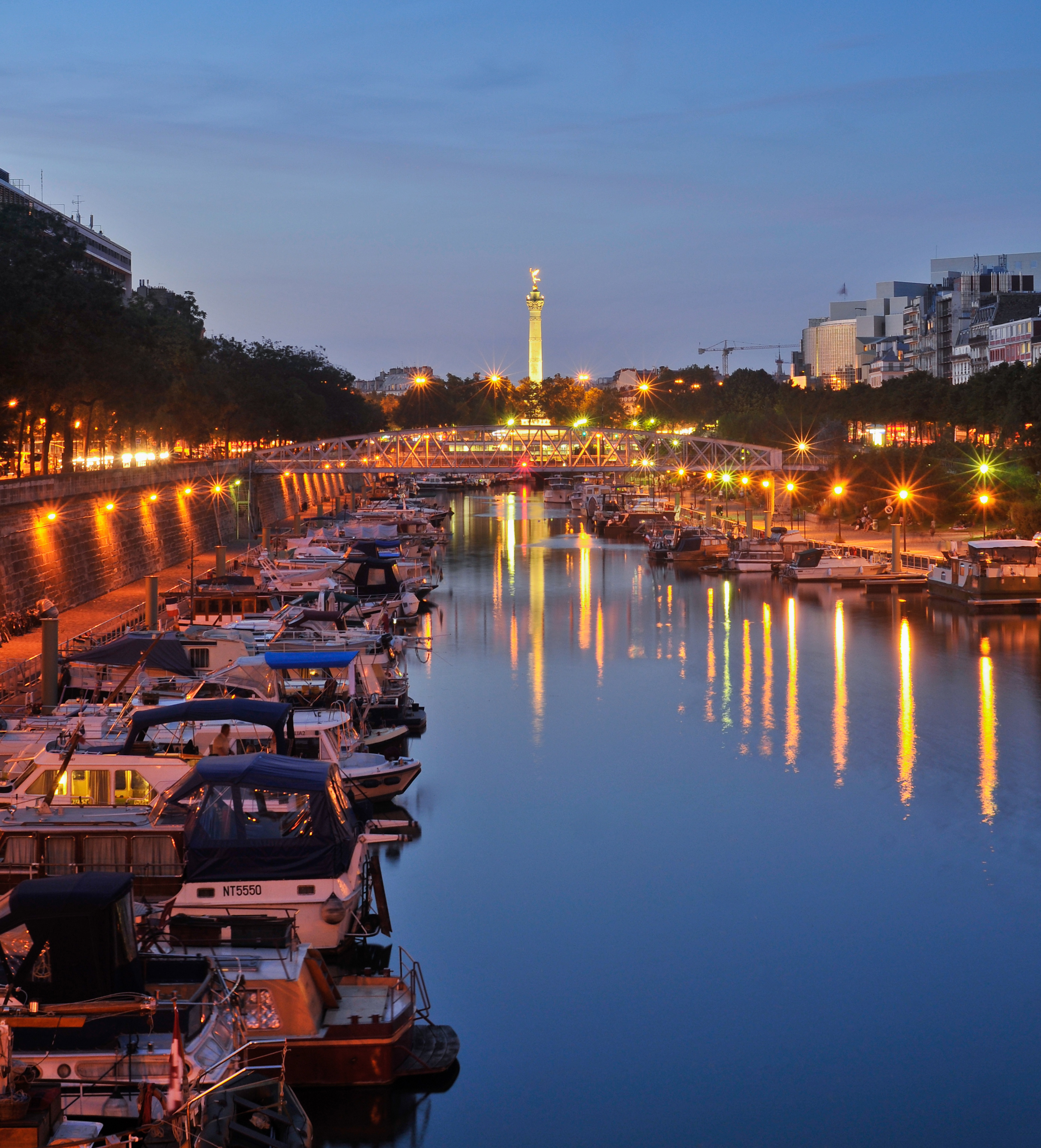
Bassin de l'Arsenal and Colonne de Juillet at night.

The Bassin de l'Arsenal (French pronunciation: [basɛ̃ də laʁsənal]; also known as the Port de l'Arsenal [pɔʁ -]) is a boat basin in Paris. It links the Canal Saint-Martin, which begins at the Place de la Bastille, to the Seine, at the Quai de la Rapée. A component of the Réseau des Canaux Parisiens (Parisian Canal Network), it forms part of the boundary between the 4th and the 12th arrondissements. It is bordered by the Boulevard Bourdon on the 4th (westerly) side and the Boulevard de la Bastille on the 12th (easterly) side.

Bassin de l'Arsenal

From the 16th century until the 19th, an arsenal existed at this location. The neighborhood, Arsenal, which borders the western (4th arrondissement) side of the bassin, was named after this military facility.

== Description ==
The water level of the Bassin de l'Arenal is 3 meters above the level of the Seine. It is connected to the river by a lock to allow navigation. This lock is the ninth on the Saint-Martin Canal. A footbridge crossing the bassin was built in 1895: long known as the Mornay Footbridge, it was renamed the Jim Morrison Footbridge in February 2025. Spanning the two banks of the Arsenal Basin, it connects Boulevard Bourdon in the 4th arrondissement to Boulevard de la Bastille in the 12th arrondissement.

During the construction of the metro station for line 1 at Place de la Bastille and line 5 south of the Arsenal Basin, two metal bridges were built at either end of the basin between 1879 and 1928. The widening of the Morland Bridge over the Arsenal lock was carried out at the same time.

The Paris-Arsenal marina, opened in 1983, offers 177 berths. During the marina's development, the Port-de-l'Arsenal garden was created on the eastern bank of the basin, on the Boulevard de la Bastille side; it was incorporated in 2017 into the newly created Rives-de-Seine park.

== History ==
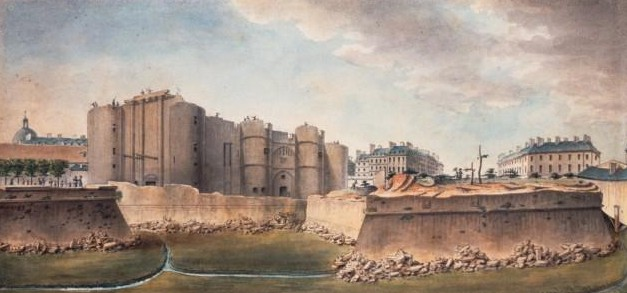
The destruction of the Bastille with the fossé (ditch) in the foreground. The fossé was later converted into the Bassin de l'Arsenal.

The origin of the Bassin was a defensive ditch of the Charles V wall around Paris built between 1356 and 1383. One of the main uses of the site of Bassin at the time was to allow water to be taken from the Seine river in order to fill the moat of the Bastille fortress. As early as 1748, the engineer Brullée, responsible for the maintenance of the Ourcq river and its associated canals, had bigger plans for the site: he contemplated linking the Ourcq with a canal via the Bassin de la Villette in order to join the Seine at the Arsenal. Brulée's plan was ultimately was realised during the 19th century.

After the destruction of the Bastille fortress in late1789 (at the start of the French Revolution), the Bassin de l'Arsenal replaced the ditch. Between 1822 and 1825, the construction of the Saint Martin canal was completed. This canal system (which crossed the place de la Bastille underground) became an important xx for commerce, thereby amplifying the importance of the Bassin de l'Arsenal as a commercial port. It also provided drinking water to this part of Paris.

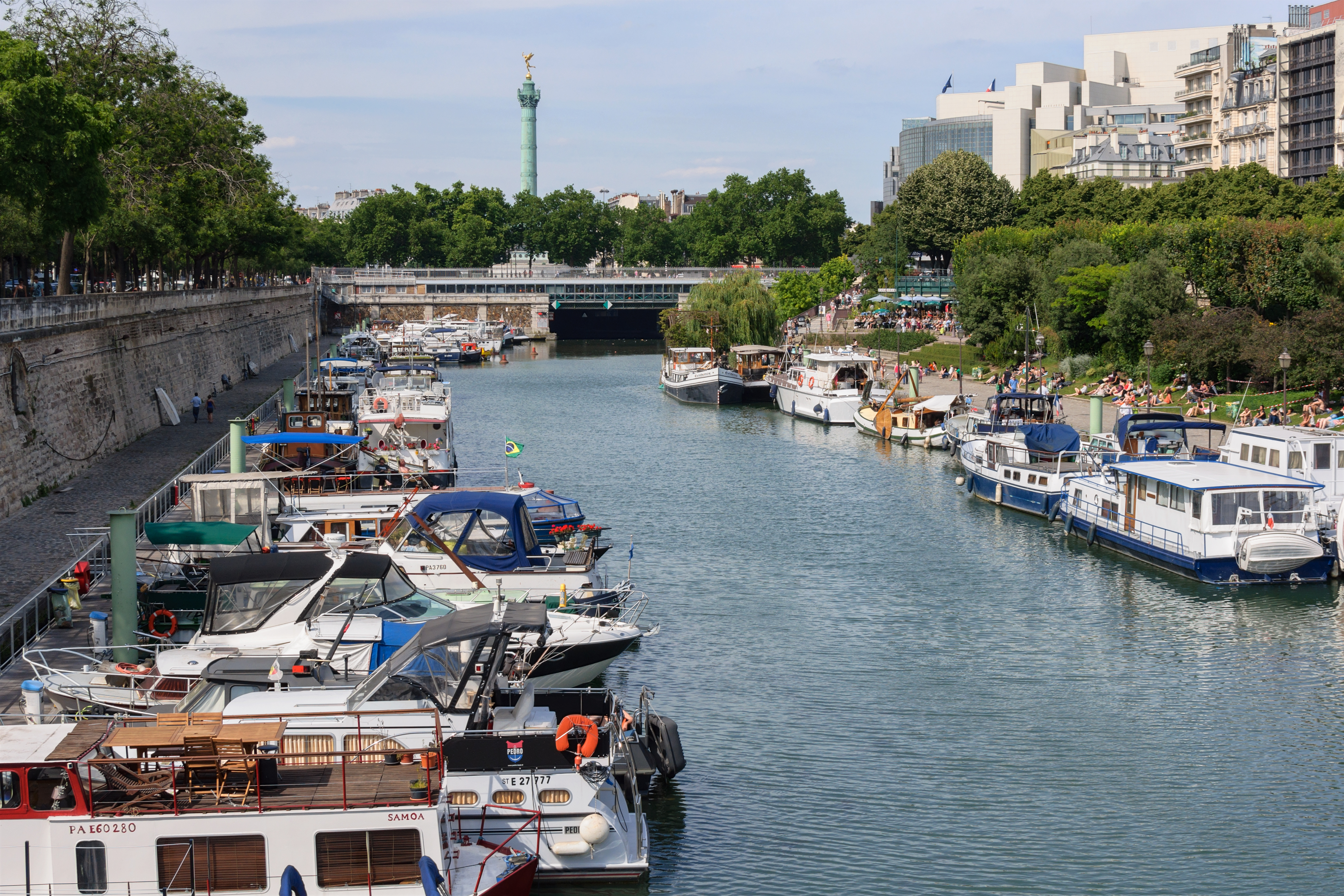
Port de l'Arsenal, Colonne de Juillet and Opera Bastille

The port was converted into a leisure port in 1983 by a decision of the Mairie de Paris (Paris City Hall) and the Chamber of Commerce and Industry, and it is now run by the Association for the Leisure Port of Paris-Arsenal.

The basin is part of France's national Voies navigables de France (VNF, Navigable Waterways of France) system. Since that time, it has been a marina (in French, a port de plaisance), for approximately 180 pleasure boats.

== Metro stations ==
The Bassin de l'Arsenal is located between the Paris Métro stations Quai de la Rapée and Bastille (except the Line 1 platforms, which crosses over the Bassin), and is a short walk from Sully – Morland (Paris Métro). It is served by lines,, and.

== See also ==
- Bassin de la Villette
- Canal de l'Ourcq
- Canal Saint-Denis
- Canal Saint-Martin
- Place de la Bastille
- Pavillon de l'Arsenal: Created in 1988, the Pavillon is a center for information, documentation, and expositions concerning urban planning and architecture.
- Caserne des Célestins of the Garde Républicaine: The ceremonial unit of the French Gendarmerie.
- Pont de Sully: The closest bridge across the Seine.
- Square Henri Galli: Contains vestiges of the Bastille fortress.
- Bibliothèque nationale de France: An important branch of the great library, one frequented by Victor Hugo, is near the boat basin.
- Prefecture de Police: Part of the French National Police, which provides the police force for the city of Paris and the surrounding three départements (Hauts-de-Seine, Seine-Saint-Denis, and Val-de-Marne.)
- Opéra Bastille: A modern opera house, it is the home of the Opéra National de Paris.
- Quinze-Vingts Hospital: The National Hospital Center for Ophthalmology (CHNO).
- Institut de la Vision (Paris): Associated with the CHNO.
- La Poste: The main post office of Paris is nearby.
- Lycée Professionnel Chennevières Malezieux: At 33 Avenue Ledru-Rollin.
