= Bassin de la Villette =

Artificial lake in Paris, France

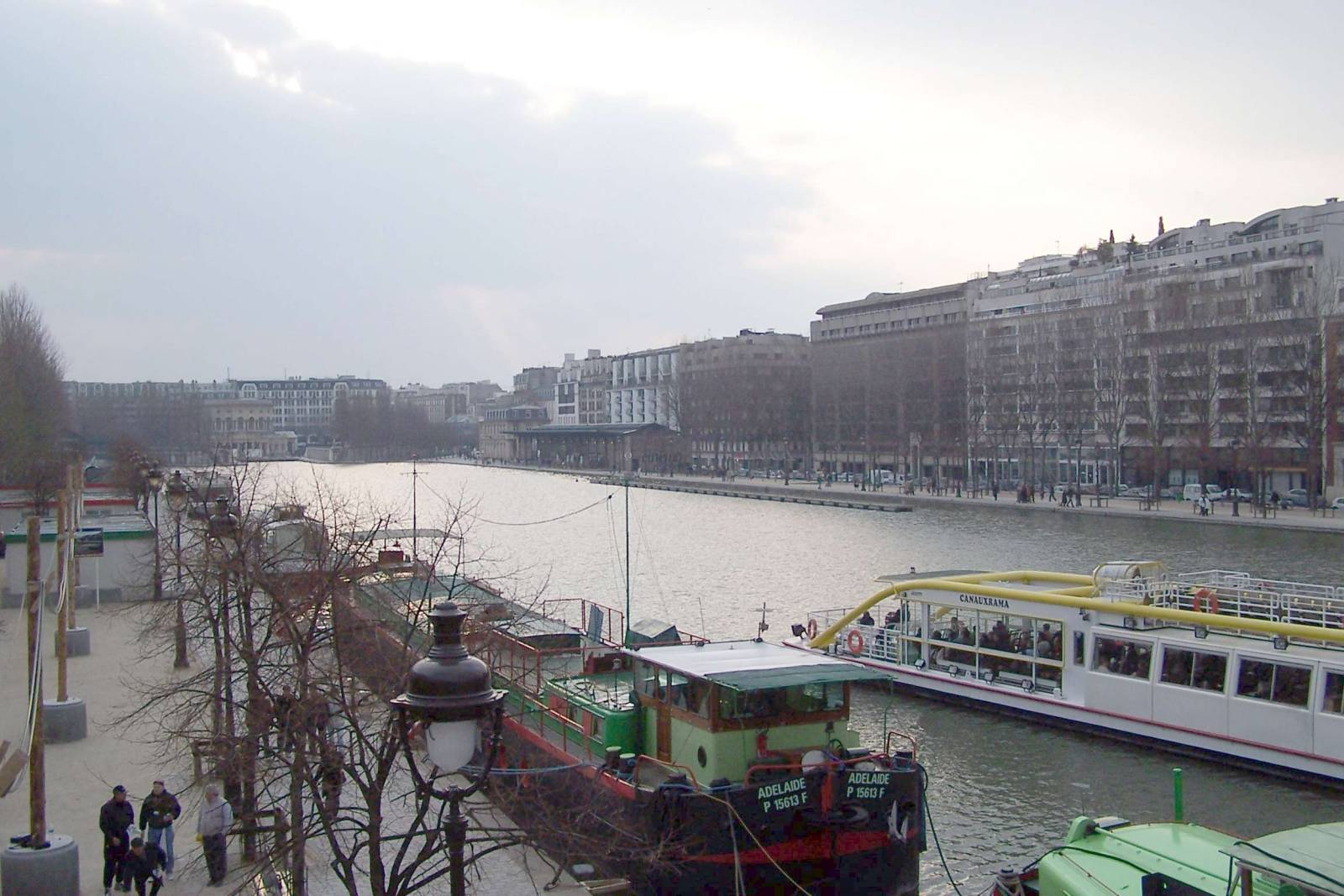
- The Bassin de la Villette

- Location within Paris
- Location: Paris
- Coordinates: 48°53′10″N 2°22′30″E
- Type: Basin
- Part of: Parisian Canal Network
- First flooded: December 2, 1808
- Max. length: 800 m (2,600 ft)
- Max. width: 70 m (230 ft)
- Settlements: Paris

The Bassin de la Villette (French pronunciation: [basɛ̃ də la vilɛt], La Villette Basin) is the largest artificial lake in Paris. It was filled with water on 2 December 1808. Located in the 19th arrondissement of the capital, it links the Canal de l'Ourcq to the Canal Saint-Martin, and it represents one of the elements of the Réseau des Canaux Parisiens (Parisian Canal Network), a public-works authority operated by the city. The other components of the network are the Canal de l'Ourcq, the Canal Saint-Denis, the Canal Saint-Martin, and the Bassin de l'Arsenal. Together, these canals and basins extend roughly 130 kilometres (81 mi).

Rectangular, eight hundred metres in length and seventy metres in width, it begins at the Rue de Crimée lifting bridge, the last bridge in Paris that can be raised and lowered hydraulically to permit the passage of ship and barge traffic beneath it, and it ends at the Place de la Bataille-de-Stalingrad near the Rotunda de la Villette. River cruise boats tie-up here and the shores of the basin are also the location of the MK2 Quai de Loire and MK2 Quai de Seine theatre complexes which are the most modern in France. A small electric passenger ferry, the Zéro de conduite, is available for transporting people from one side of the basin to the other.

The basin is bordered in the north by the Quai de la Seine and in the south by the Quai de la Loire, which are linked in the middle of the basin by a footbridge, the Passerelle de la Moselle.

== History ==
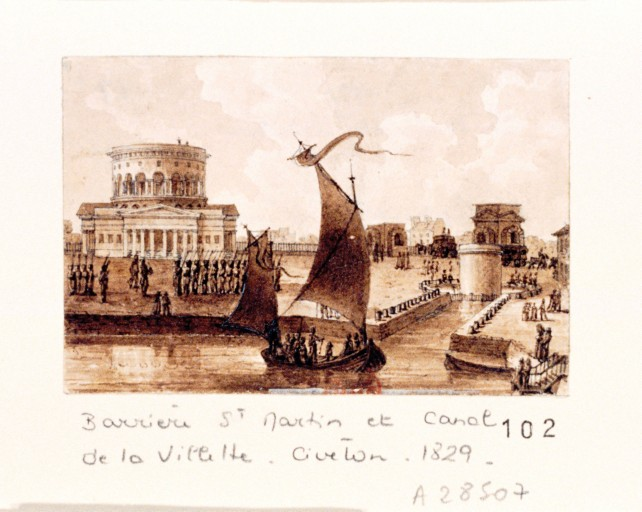
The Saint-Martin barrier and the canal at the beginning of the 19th century, by Christophe Civeton.

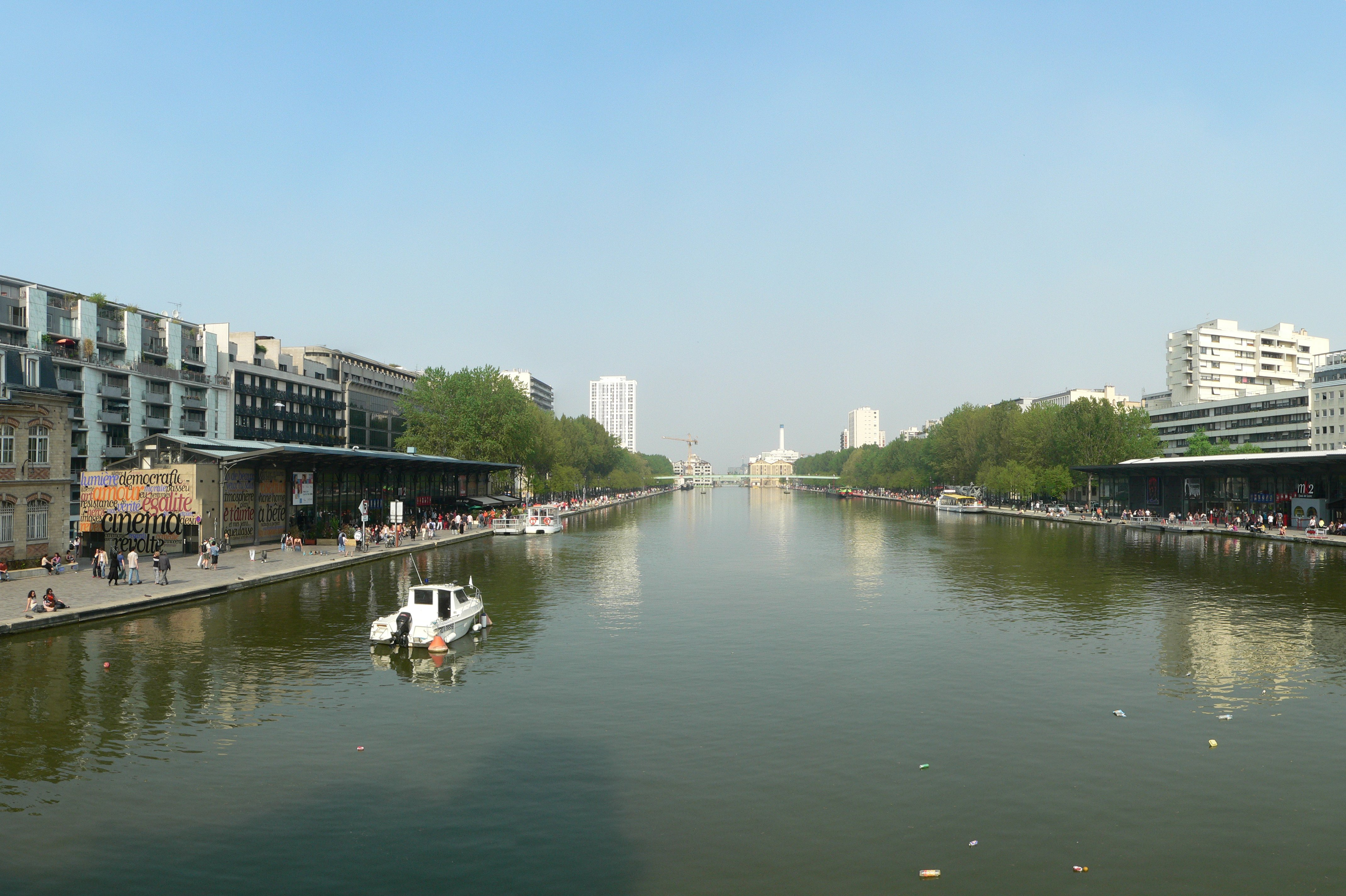
View from the Rotonde de la Villette towards the old warehouses

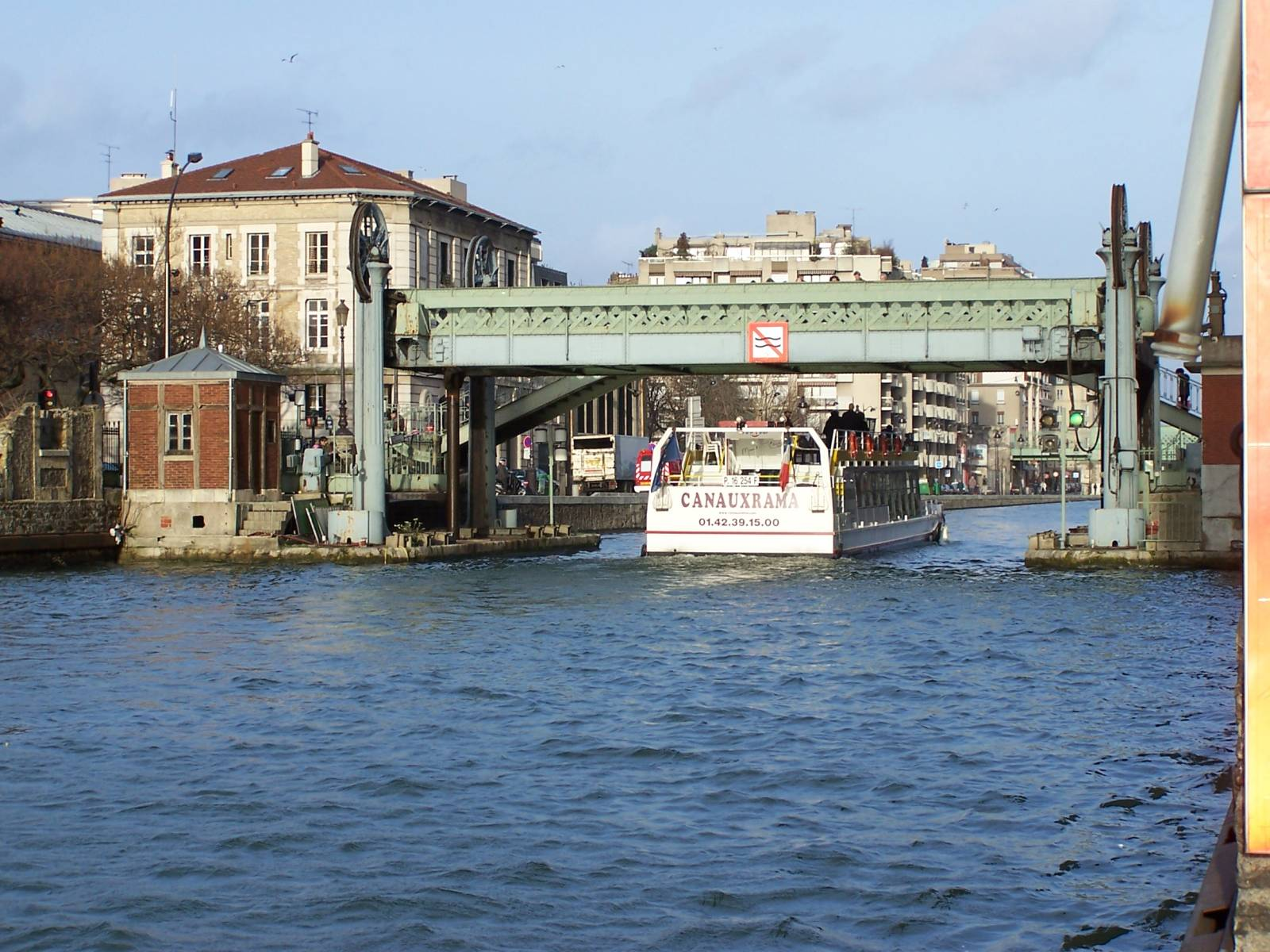
The Lifting bridge at Rue de Crimée

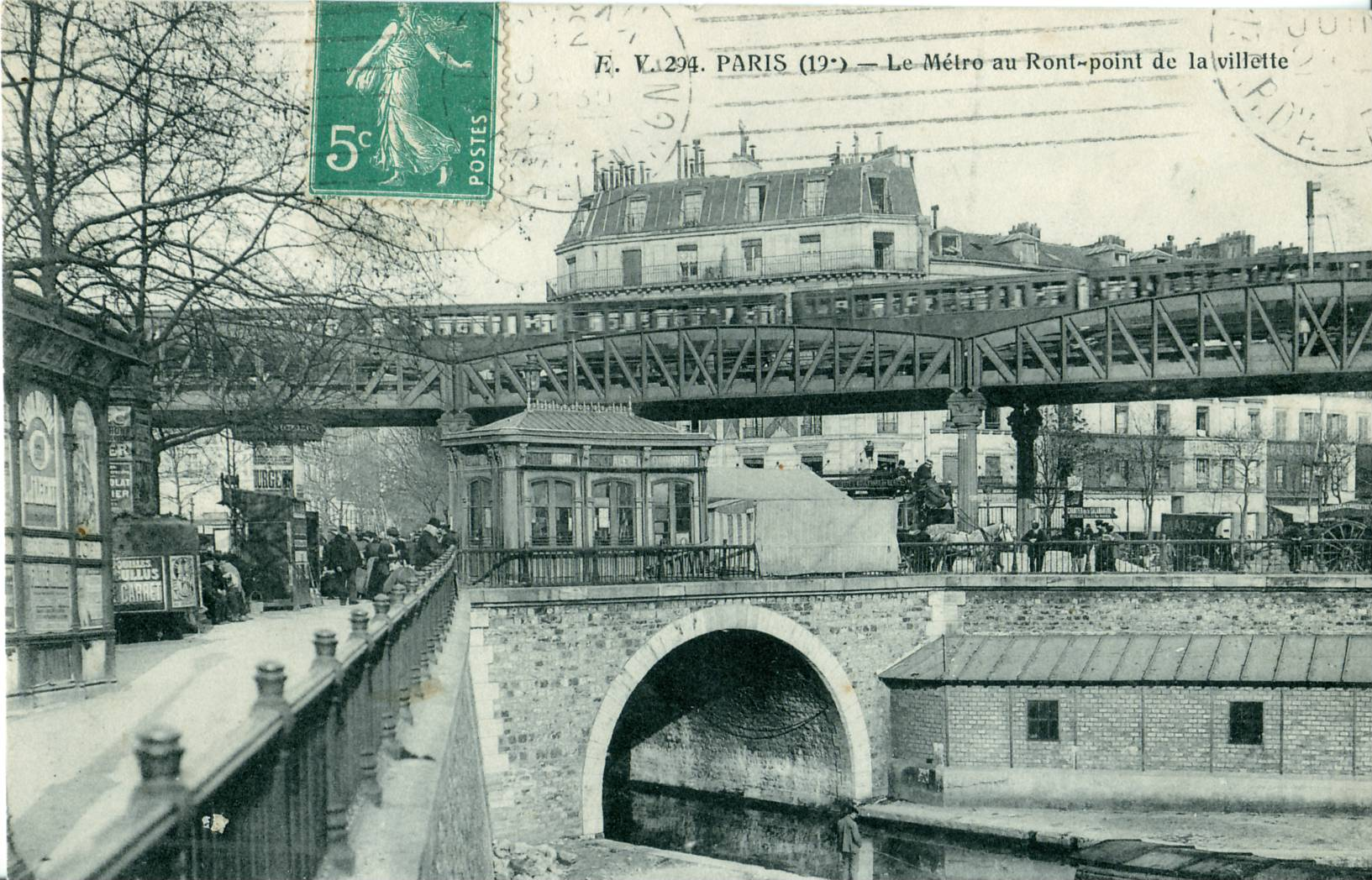
The end of the basin at the Rotonde de la Villette (Place de la Bataille-de-Stalingrad). On this postcard from the beginning of the twentieth century the southern end of the basin where it becomes the Canal Saint-Martin can be seen. Over the opening to the canal is a kiosk for the General Omnibus Company which was a part of the tramway and the bus system of Paris. Above it is the viaduct built for the Paris Métro Line 2, then operated by the Compagnie du chemin de fer métropolitain de Paris (CMP).

=== The First Basin ===
The first basin

The first Bassin de la Villette is 699 metres long and 70 metres wide. It has served several functions.

Its original function was to serve as a reserve of drinking water for Parisians. Its secondary function, in association with the second basin, was to provide water for navigation on the canals of Saint-Denis and Saint-Martin.

At the beginning of the 19th century the first basin was surrounded by gardens where Parisians came to spend pleasant interludes (walking in summer, skating in winter). But the industrial era of the 1850s saw the disappearance of this aspect of recreation. Goods depots were built on the banks.

In 1832 Paris was hit by a great epidemic of cholera. Parisians using water from the Bassin de la Villette were less severely affected than those using water from the Seine (the Javel and Samaritaine steam pumps) because of waste waters being discharged into the river by the city - especially the waste of the Hôtel-Dieu de Paris, where there were many sick, which spanned the small arm of the river between the Ile de la Cité and the left bank.

In the late 19th century, commercial activities developed at the basin. In the same period the Moselle footbridge (13 metres high and a span of 85 metres) was built by Armand Moisant. It was decorated with a clock 3 metres in diameter. This bridge was replaced in 1966.

=== The Second basin ===
The Lifting bridge of the Rue de Crimée or Pont de Flandre, a lifting bridge weighing 85 tons built in 1885, separates the two basins. It allows traffic on the Rue de Crimée to cross the canal and connects the Quai de l'Oise on the north-west side to the Quai de la Marne on the south-east side. When the bridge is raised pedestrian traffic can still continue on a fixed elevated walkway. At the time of its construction it was the third largest lifting bridge to be built in France. It is now the last one in Paris and is registered as an historical monument.

The second basin measures 30 m wide and 730 m long. This basin, which is often prematurely named the Canal de l'Ourcq, originally ran along the back of the old village of La Villette.

At its northern end is the "roundabout of canals" where the Bassin de la Villette converges with the Canal de l'Ourcq (which brings water for more than 100 km from the river Ourcq) and the Saint-Denis canal which, with a length of 6,647.50 m and a slope of 28.45 m, joins the Seine at Saint-Denis, as well as the small Darse du fond de Rouvray canal (a port for the canal ferry boats).

== Warehouses ==
There are two buildings at the end of the Bassin de la Villette that were built between 1845 and 1853 as commercial warehouses, but which had a certain utilitarian beauty.

They were known as "general merchandise warehouses" and they were first used to store grain and flour. Their design, execution, and placement were based on the urban plans originally conceived by Claude Nicolas Ledoux in the eighteenth century, and they operated in perfect symmetry at the Bassin de la Villette, one on the Quai de la Seine side, and one on the Quai de la Loire side.

Later, they gradually lost their original purpose and at the end of the 20th century were transformed into artists' studios and workshops, small offices, and other small enterprises.

In 1990 the building on the Quai de la Seine side was burned beyond repair. For security reasons the storehouse on the quai de la Loire side was also closed. These warehouses have now been replaced by the MK2 cinema complexes.

=== River transport and the economic role of the basin ===
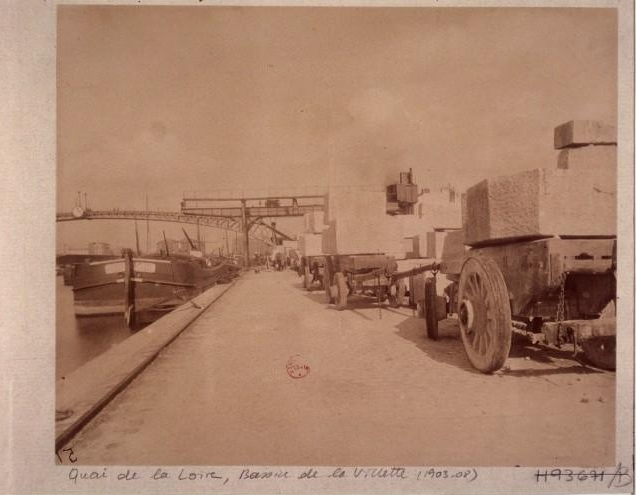
Loire Quay around 1903-1908

Intensive freight and port activity developed around the canals from the second quarter of the 19th century. In the last half of the same century there was a great deal of industrialization in Paris in the area of the present Seine-Saint-Denis. At the same time port traffic in the Bassin de la Villette was at its peak and equal to the port of Bordeaux.

During the 20th century this freight traffic experienced significant peaks mainly related to construction activity after the world wars. Steadily declining since the middle of the 20th century this traffic disappeared for the Bassin de La Villette and is currently at its lowest level in history for all Parisian canals (around 1 million tons in 2000).

At the same time tourism-related passengers from the Bassin de la Villette slowly began to increase.

== Cultural and leisure activities ==
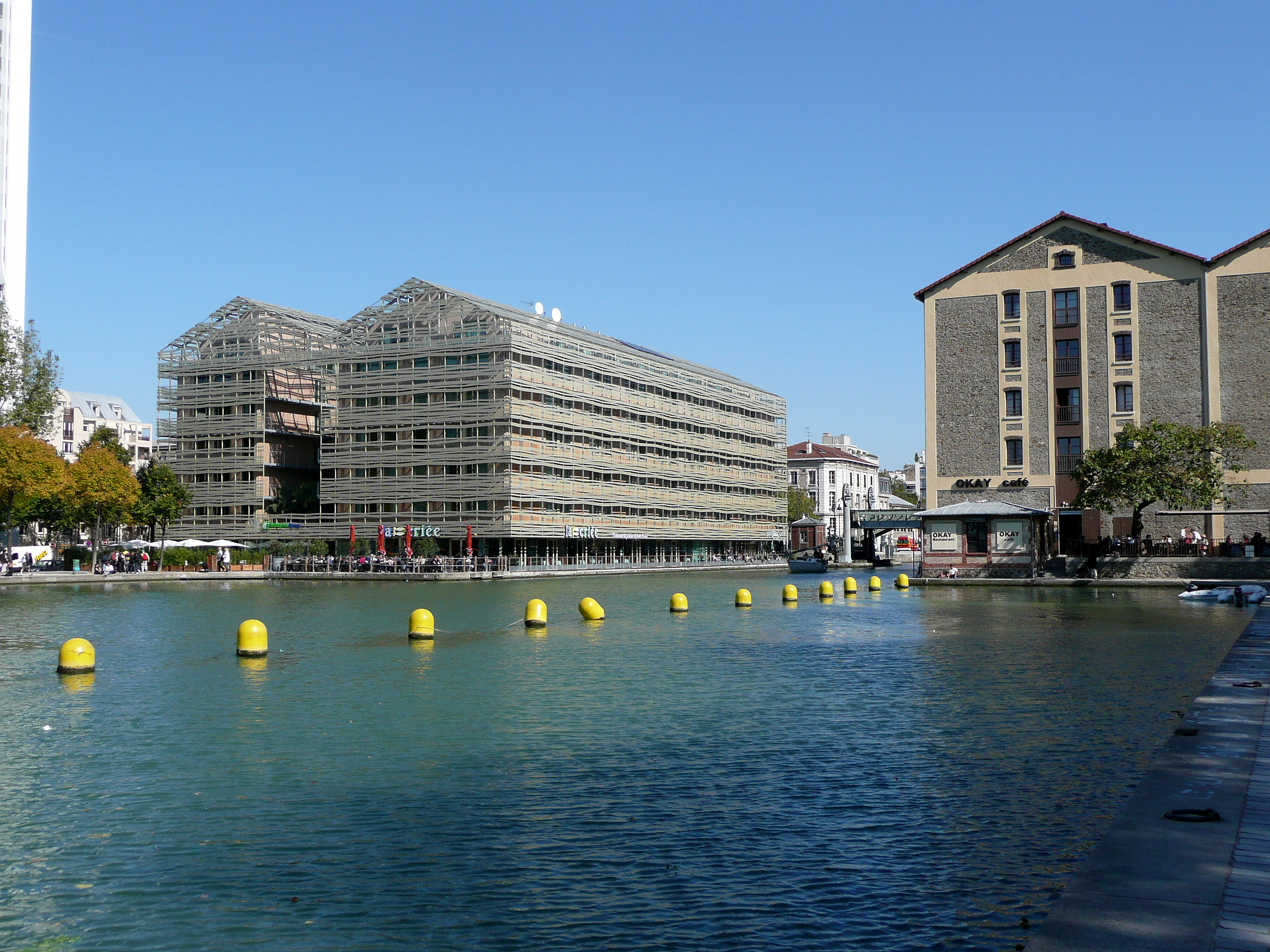
The buildings at the north-east of the Bassin de la Villette

Barges are moored along the banks of the basin throughout the year offering cultural activities such as theatre, cinema, concerts, etc.

In summer the banks of the basin are used by fishermen, bowls players, and picnickers. On summer evenings it is not unusual for the left bank (exposed longer to the sun) to be occupied from one end to the other.

Every year in June is the festival of the basin. There are festive activities on both sides (concerts, mini-shows, exhibitions). The celebration ends with a big fireworks display from the bridge.

Since 2007 an extension of the Paris-Plages has taken possession of a large part of the quay of the Seine and offers taverns, restaurants, boat rides, children's play area, petanque, etc.

Rowing is practiced throughout the year on the water.

On the Quai de la Seine there are the Sup de Pub and Sup Career schools which are both INSEEC Business Schools.

== Picture Gallery ==
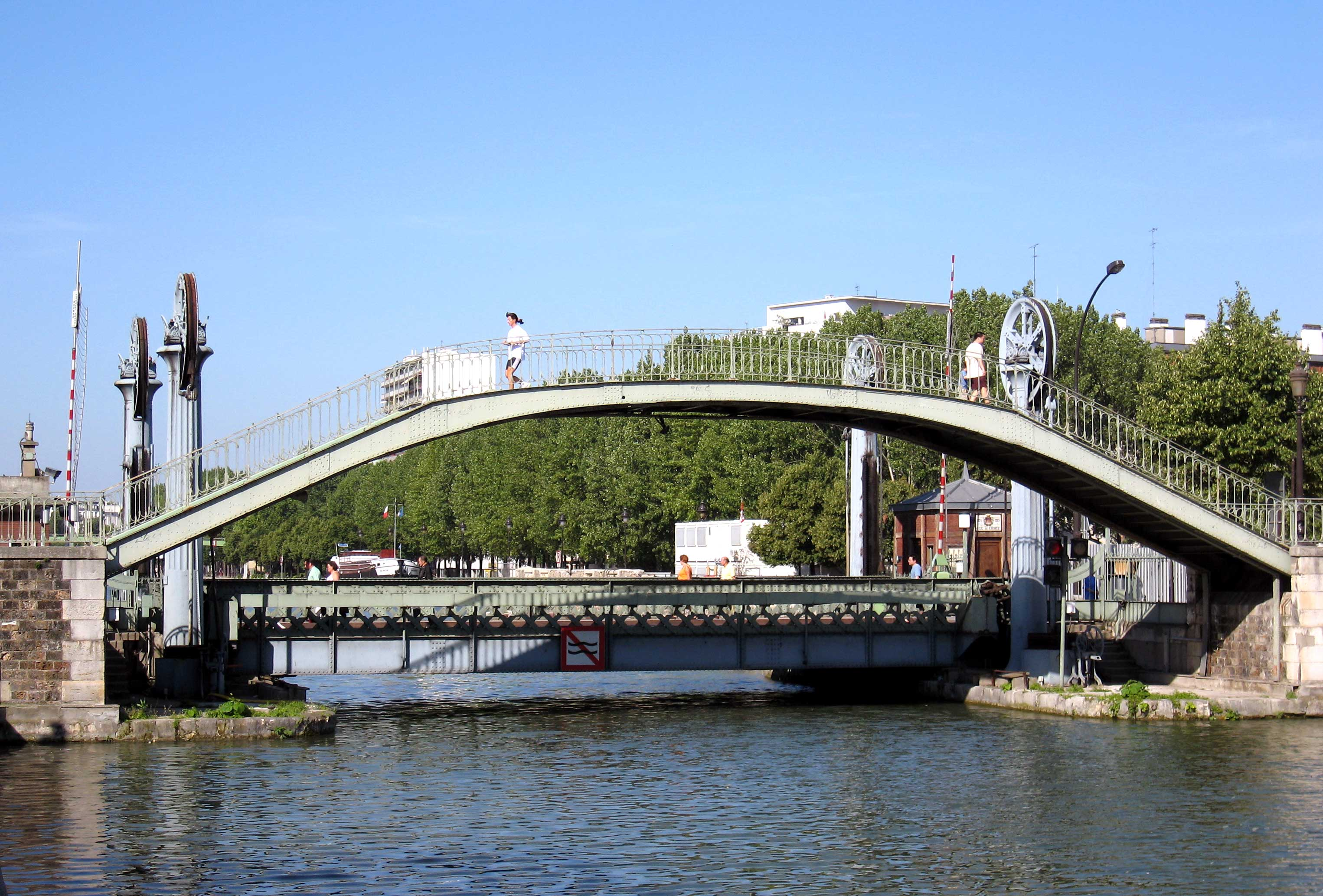
The bridge in its lowered position with the pedestrian bridge

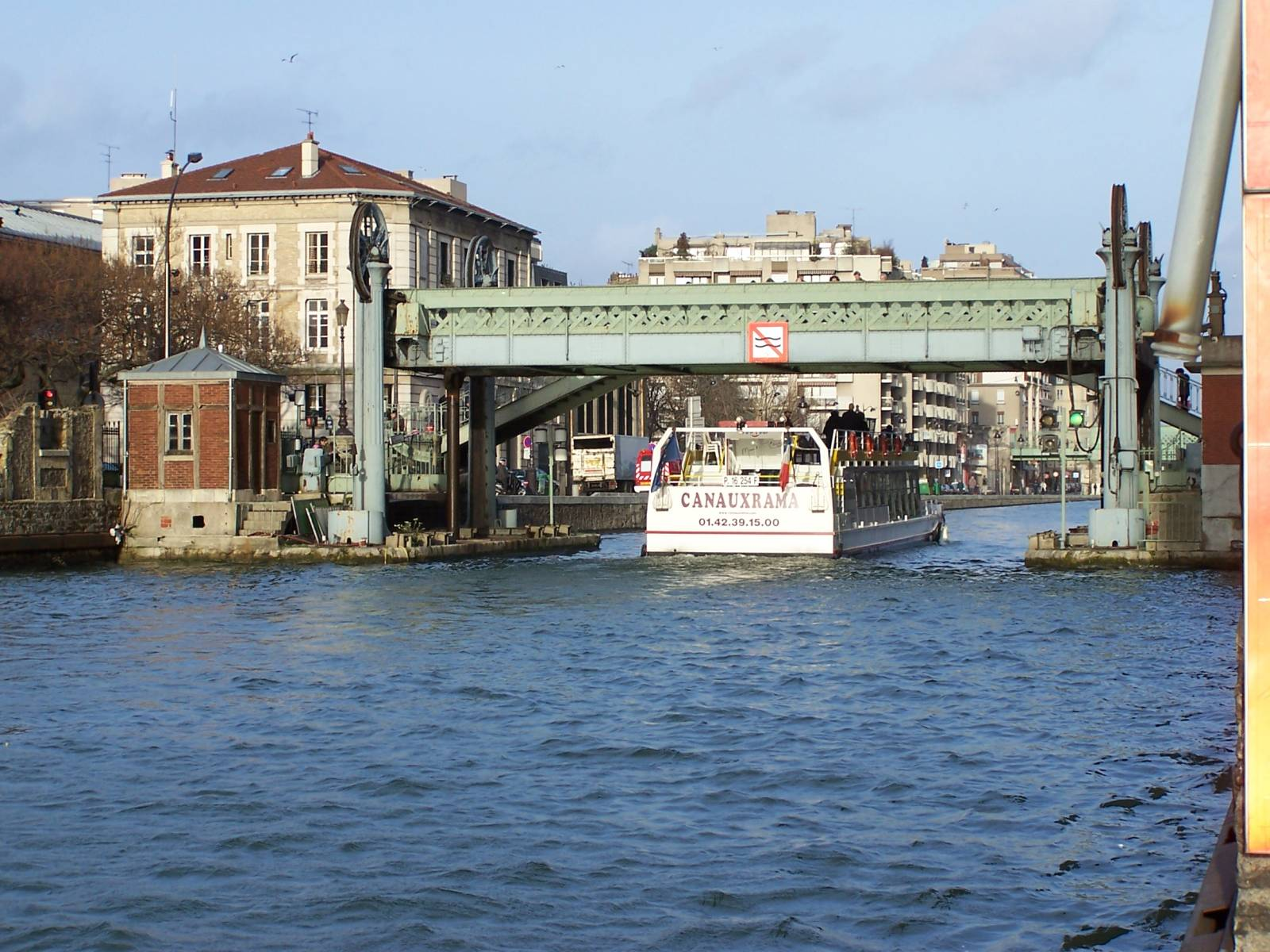
The bridge in its raised position

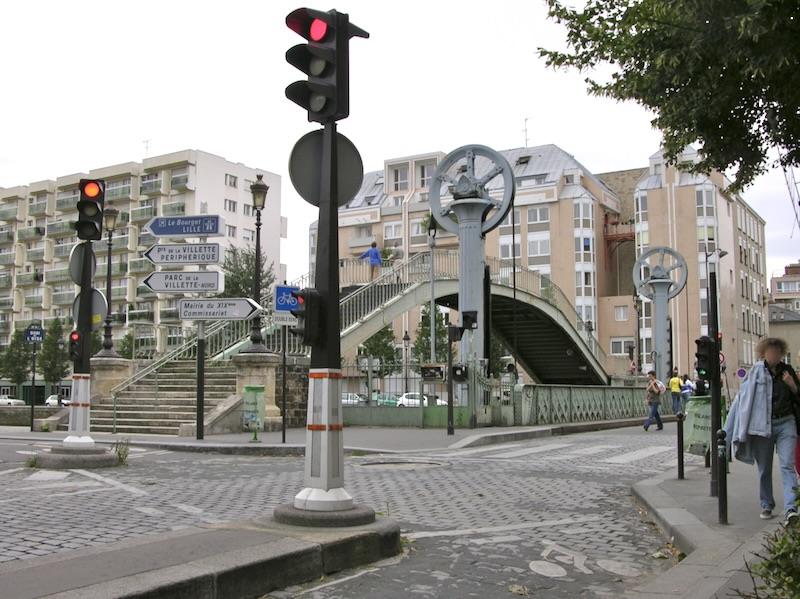
The bridge from the Rue de Crimée

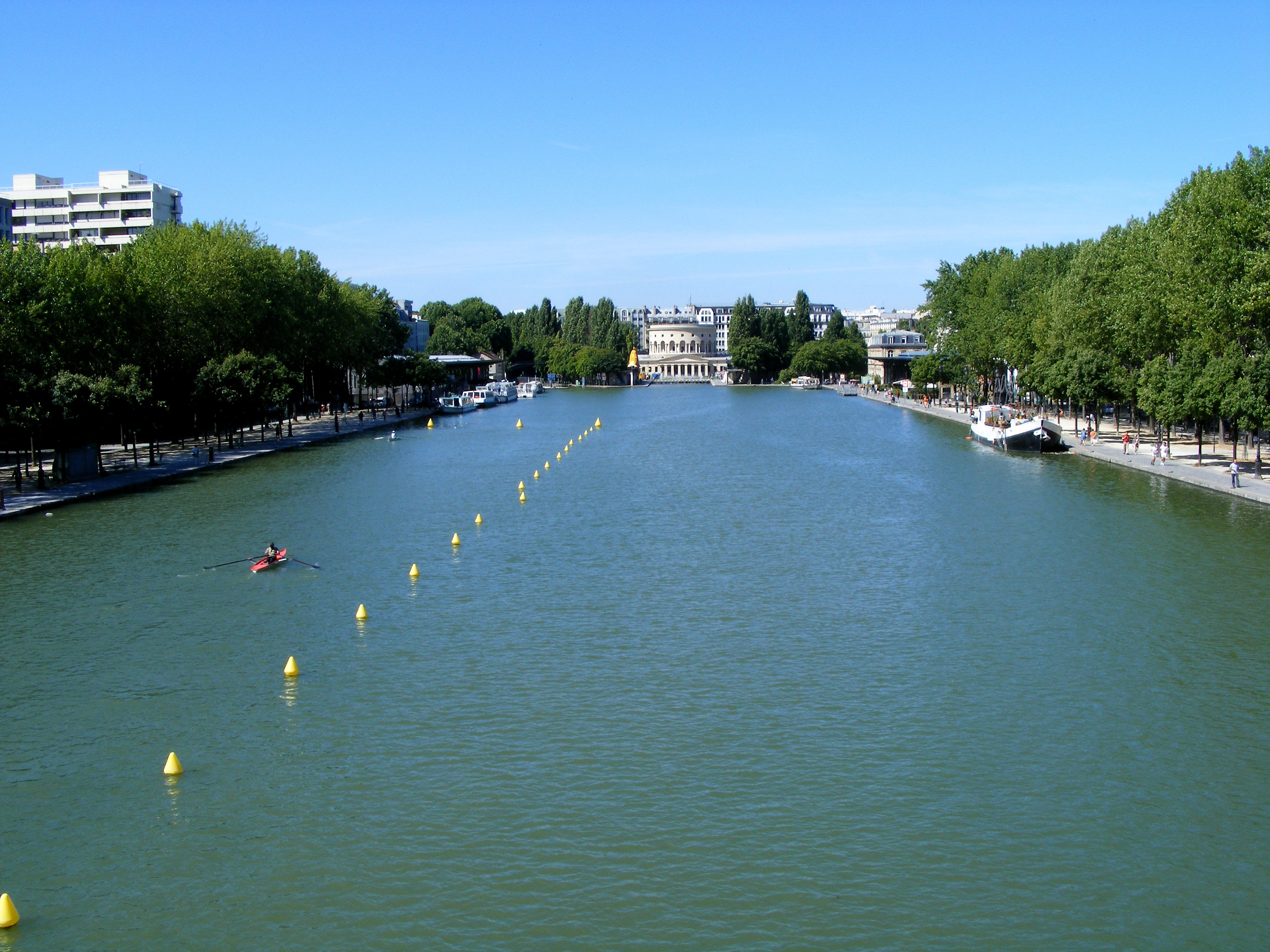
The Bassin de la Villette from the central footbridge towards the Rotunda de la Villette

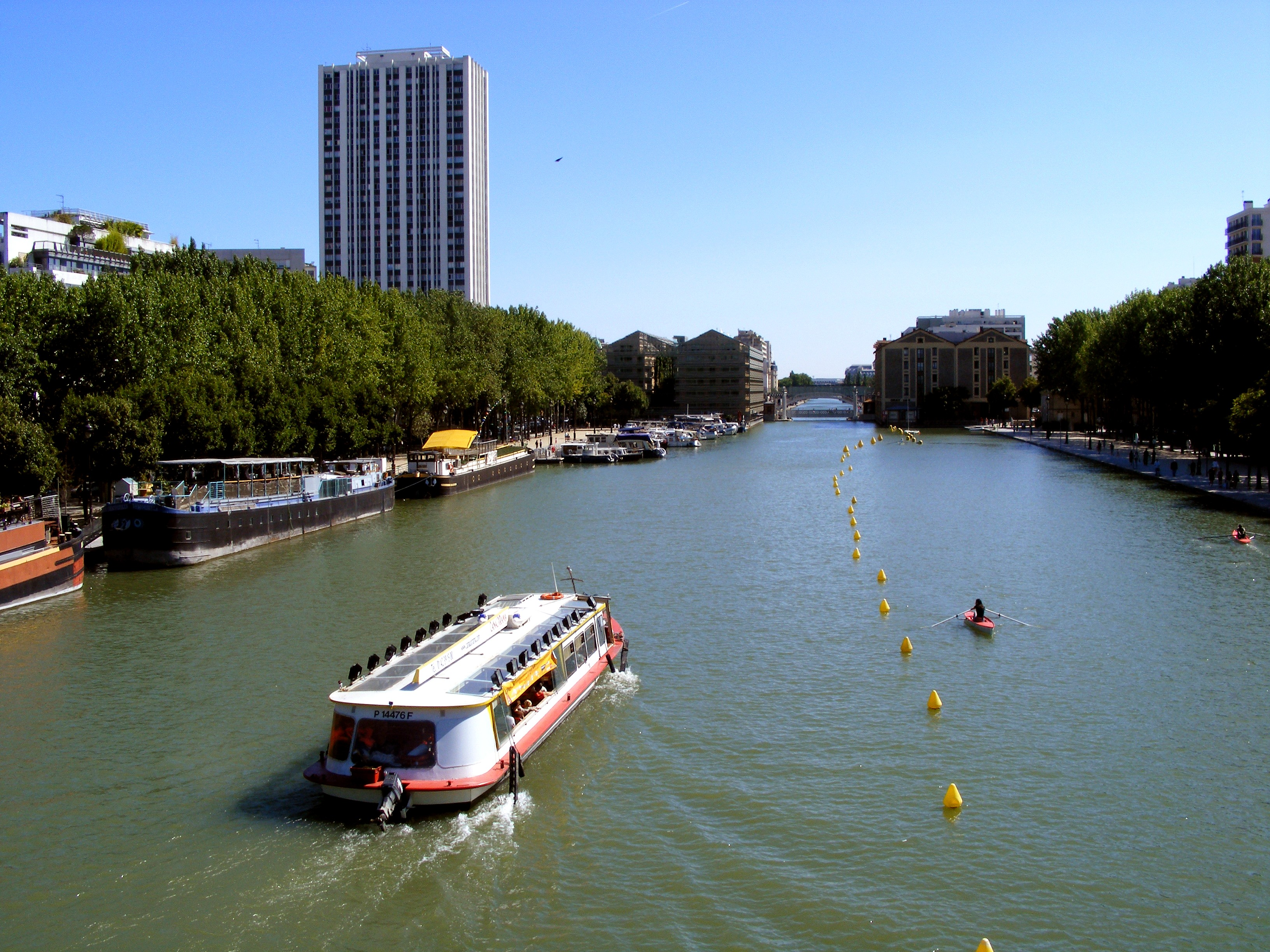
Bassin de la Villette from the central footbridge towards the old warehouses.

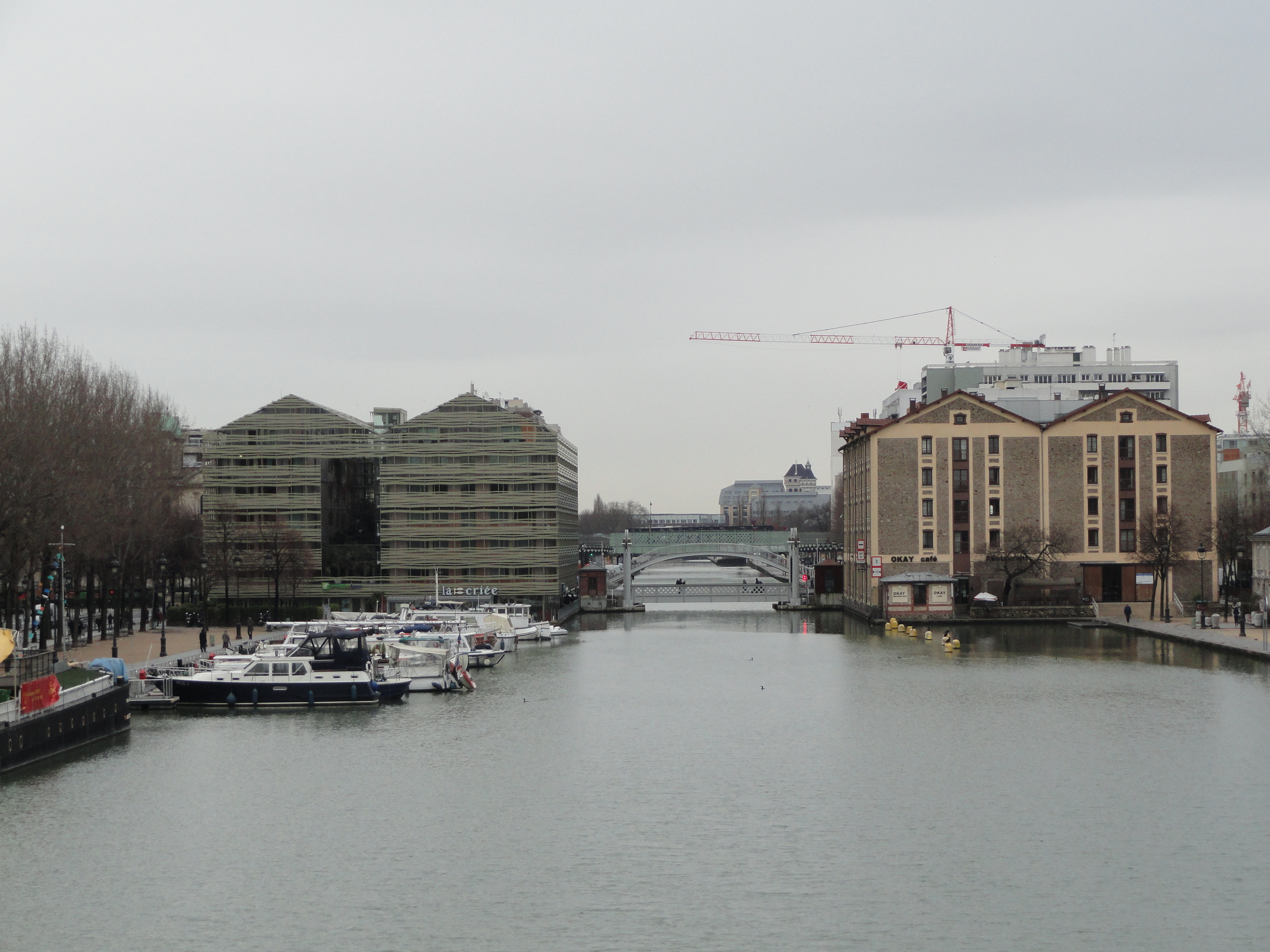
Bassin de la Villette in winter from the central footbridge towards the old warehouses with the old Grands Moulins de Pantin (Great Mills of Pantin) on the right

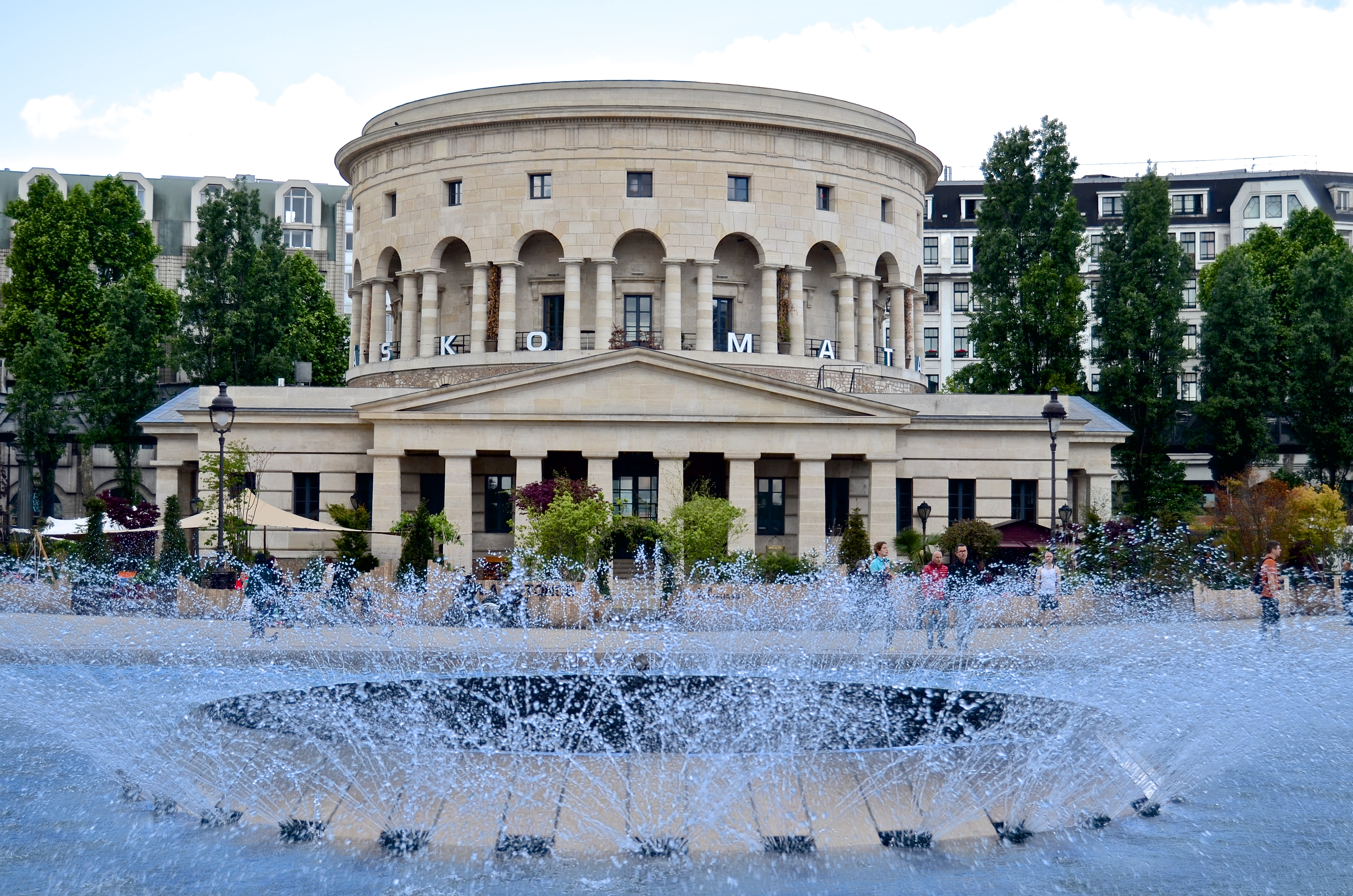
The Fountain and the Rotunda

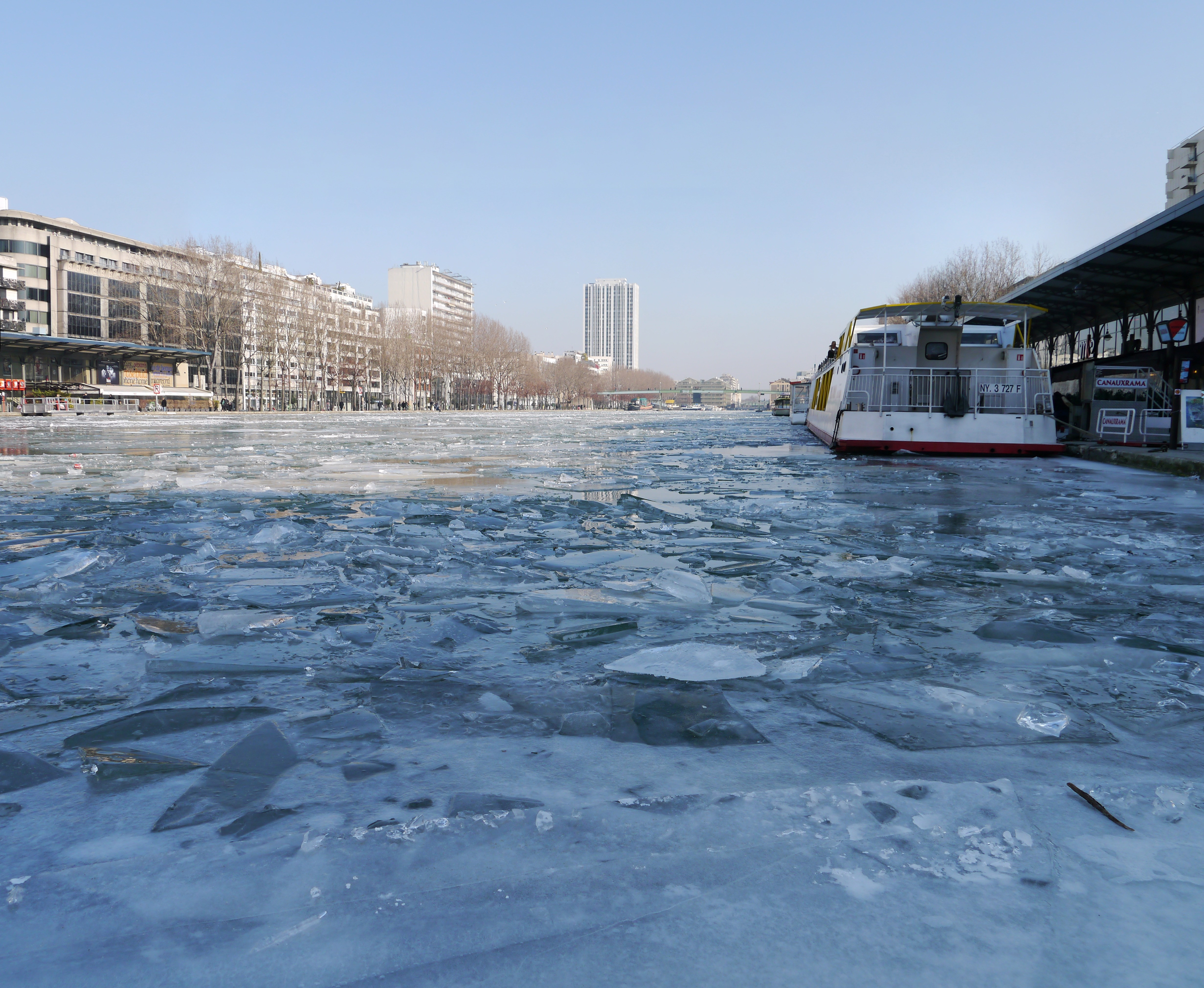
The Frozen canal

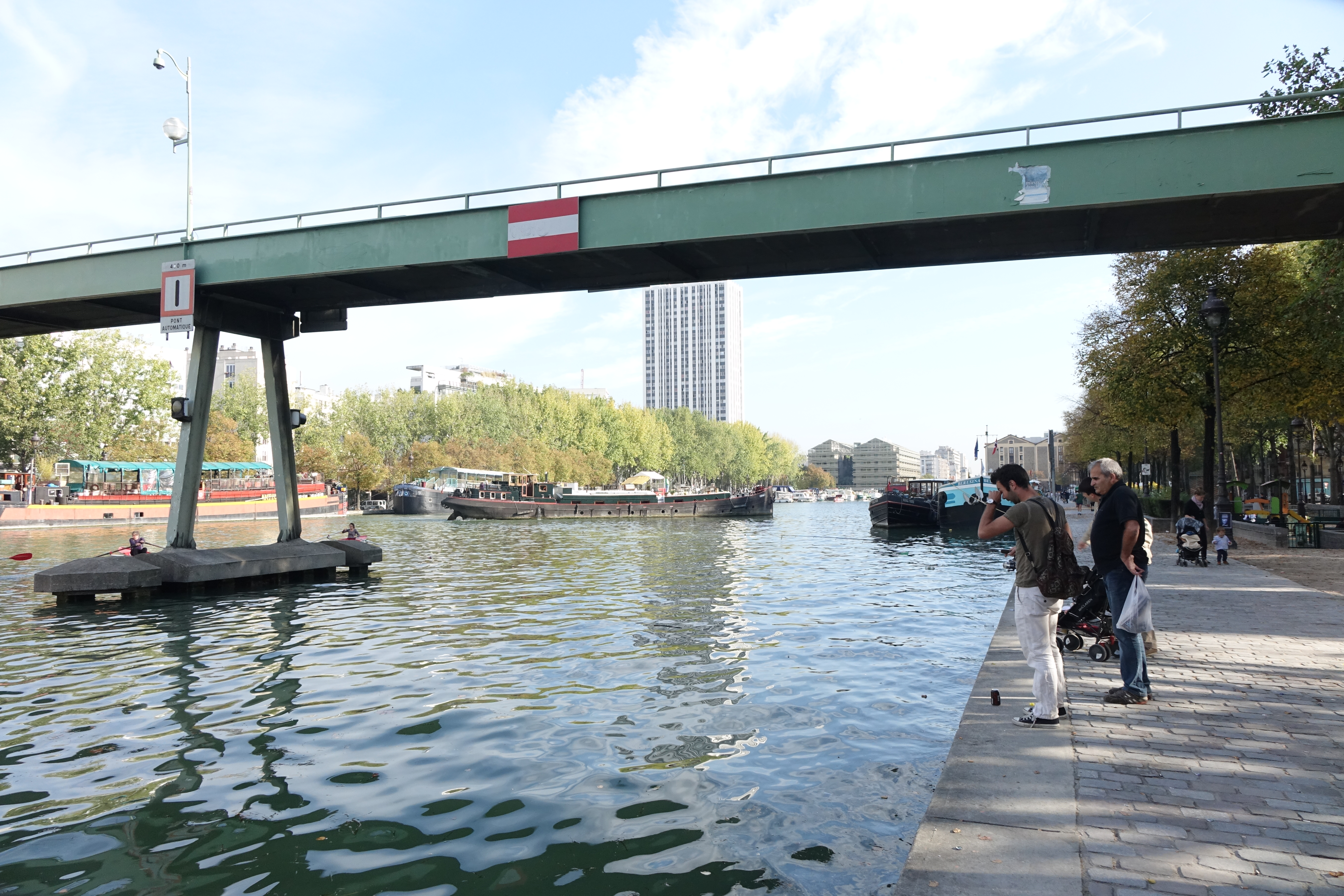
The Footbridge Passerelle de la Moselle
