= Battle of Gué-à-Tresmes =

1814 battle during the War of the Sixth Coalition

- Part of the Campaign of France of the Sixth Coalition
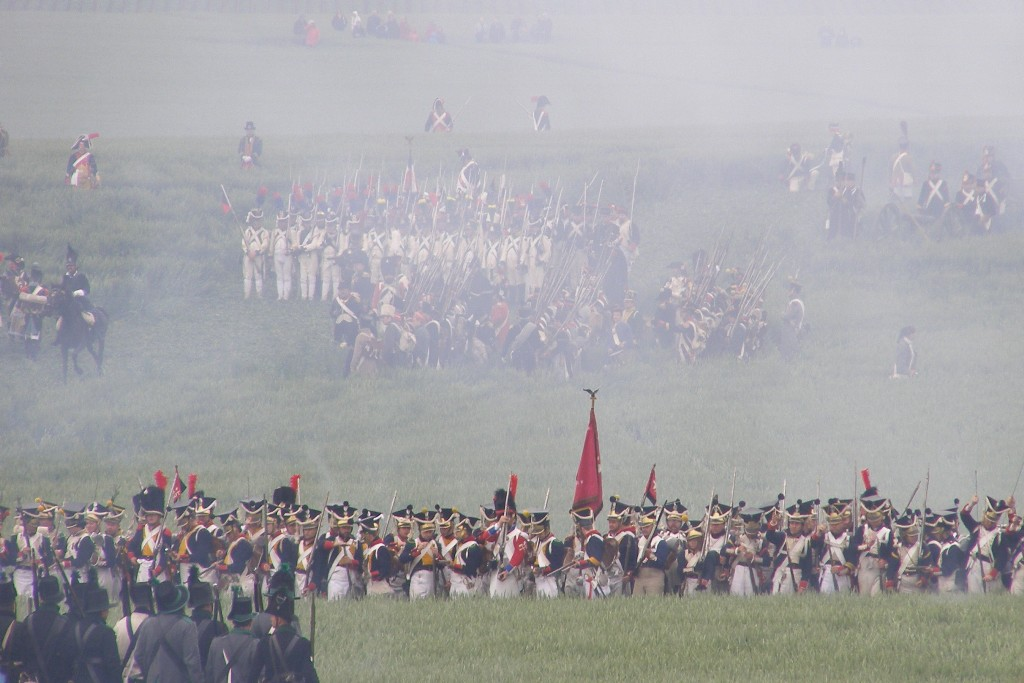
- Kleist's Prussians may have witnessed a scene like this as the 2nd Old Guard Division advanced toward them. Photo is from a reenactment of the Battle of Waterloo.
Date	28 February – 1 March 1814
Location	Congis-sur-Thérouanne, French Empire 49°00′28″N 2°58′34″E
Result	French victory

Belligerents
(First French Empire) France	(Kingdom of Prussia) Prussia (Russian Empire) Russia

Commanders and leaders
(First French Empire) Auguste de Marmont (First French Empire) Édouard Mortier	(Kingdom of Prussia) Friedrich von Kleist (Russian Empire) Peter Kaptzevich

Strength
10,000–14,000	12,000

Casualties and losses
250 killed, wounded, or captured	Prussia: 945–1,035 killed, wounded, or captured Russia: 400 killed, wounded, or captured Total casualties: 1,345–1,435 killed, wounded, or captured
- Location within France

War of the Sixth Coalition:
Campaign in north-east France
current battle
Napoleon in command
Napoleon not in command

The Battle of Gué-à-Tresmes (28 February–1 March 1814) was fought between 14,500 French troops, including the Imperial Old Guard, led by Marshals Auguste de Marmont and Édouard Mortier, and 12,000 Prussians commanded by Friedrich Graf Kleist von Nollendorf and Friedrich von Katzler. On 28 February the French attacked and drove the Prussians to the north along the west bank of the river Ourcq. That evening and the next day Kleist tried to push the French back while Russian units under Peter Mikhailovich Kaptzevich tried to cross from the east to the west bank of the Ourcq; the Allies were unsuccessful. Gué-à-Tresmes (Tresmes Ford) is located where Route D405 crosses the Thérouanne stream about 10 kilometres (6.2 mi) northeast of Meaux.

In late February, Field Marshal Gebhard Leberecht von Blücher's Allied Army of Silesia advanced west toward Paris, pressing a badly outnumbered French force before it. When Kleist's Prussian II Corps took a menacing position on the north bank of the river Marne near Meaux, the French attacked and pushed their adversaries back. When he learned that Napoleon's army was fast approaching from the southeast, Blücher abandoned the effort to force a way past Marmont and Mortier and began retreating to the north. The action occurred during the Campaign in north-east France, part of the War of the Sixth Coalition.

== Background ==
=== Schwarzenberg retreats ===
On 18 February 1814, Napoleon mauled a Coalition corps led by Crown Prince Fredrick William of Württemberg in the Battle of Montereau. After this defeat the Austrian field marshal Karl Philipp, Prince of Schwarzenberg ordered the Army of Bohemia to withdraw to Troyes. Schwarzenberg requested that his ally Gebhard Leberecht von Blücher help defend his northern flank at Méry-sur-Seine; the Prussian general immediately marched to his aid. The Austrian intended to offer battle on 21–22 February near Troyes. However, bad news from his commander in the south, Prince Frederick VI of Hesse-Homburg altered his plans. With Marshal Pierre Augereau threatening to retake Chalon-sur-Saône and Jean Gabriel Marchand marching on Geneva, Schwarzenberg detached Vincenzo Federico Bianchi and the Austrian I Corps plus other troops. Bianchi was ordered to march to Dijon and reinforce Hesse-Homburg's forces.

At Troyes, Schwarzenberg had 90,000 troops and Blücher had 50,000 soldiers to pit against 75,000 men under Napoleon. Schwarzenberg's intelligence services habitually overrated French strength so he remained unaware of his nearly two-to-one superiority. The Allied soldiers had worn-out uniforms and not enough food in a region that had been stripped of supplies by both sides. On 22 February the French launched probing attacks on the Allied positions from Méry to Troyes. That day, Marshal Nicolas Oudinot's infantry cleared Méry of enemy troops and gained a foothold on the far bank, but they proved unable to hold their bridgehead against Coalition counterattacks. In this action, 3,600 French troops from Pierre François Xavier Boyer's division fought against 5,000 Russians from Alexei Grigorievich Scherbatov's VI Infantry Corps of Fabian Wilhelm von Osten-Sacken's command and 1,200 men from Ludwig Yorck von Wartenburg's Prussian I Corps. That evening Schwarzenberg ordered his army to withdraw behind the river Seine, except for Ignaz Gyulai's III Corps, which was directed to move southeast to Bar-sur-Seine.

Disappointed that his Austrian colleague was determined to retreat, Blücher requested permission to operate independently and it was granted him. He hoped to join forces with two corps under Ferdinand von Wintzingerode and Friedrich Wilhelm Freiherr von Bülow and advance toward Paris by a northerly route. Meanwhile, on 23 February Schwarzenberg's army withdrew to the east. The Coalition leaders sent an envoy to Napoleon to propose a truce, but the emperor's unreasonable conditions nixed the plan.

=== Blücher's offensive ===
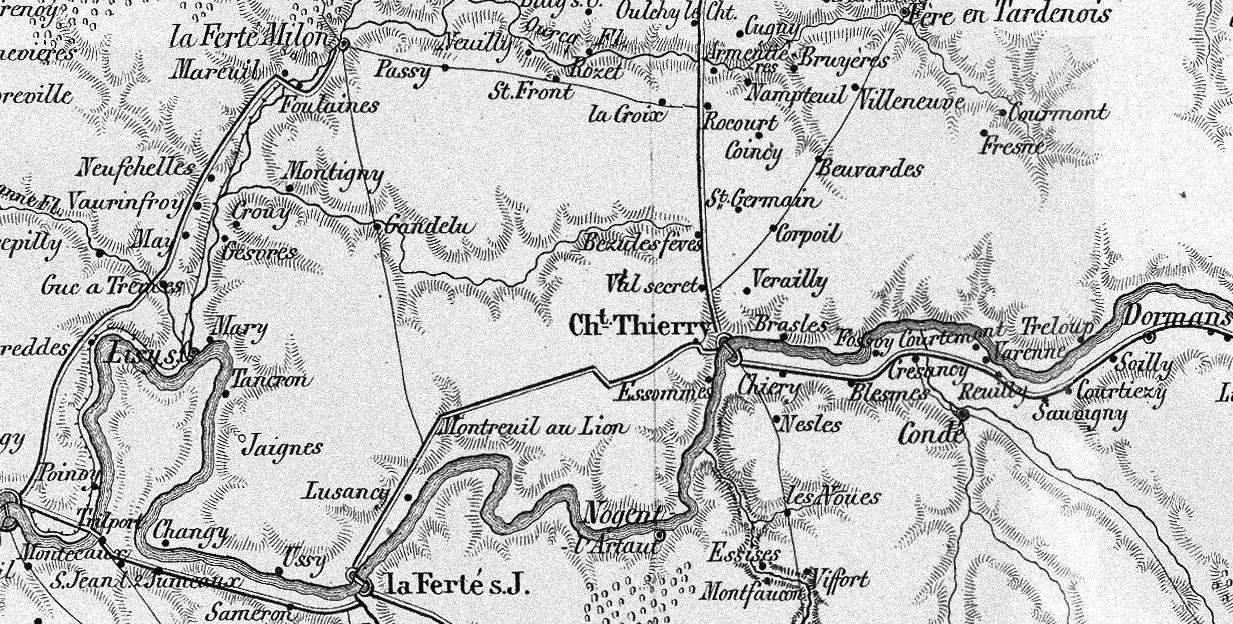
Map of the battle area shows Gué-à-Tresmes at left and Meaux (not labeled) on the river Marne at the lower left map edge. Kleist was driven back toward La Ferté-Milon at top left.

With 53,000 troops, Blücher's Army of Silesia began moving north on the morning of 24 February, destroying the bridges at Arcis-sur-Aube and Plancy-l'Abbaye behind it. That evening he received an order from Schwarzenberg to withdraw east and form the right flank of the Army of Bohemia. Since this would have exposed his march to a French attack, Blücher ignored his instructions and continued marching northwest toward Sézanne. Marshal Auguste de Marmont was at Sézanne with 6,000 soldiers on the evening of 24 February. Detecting the build up of Allied forces in his direction, the French marshal withdrew to the Vindey heights to the west of Sézanne. On 26 February Marmont fell back west toward La Ferté-Gaucher, while calling for Marshal Édouard Mortier to join him at La Ferté-sous-Jouarre. Between Marmont and Mortier there were only 10,000 soldiers.

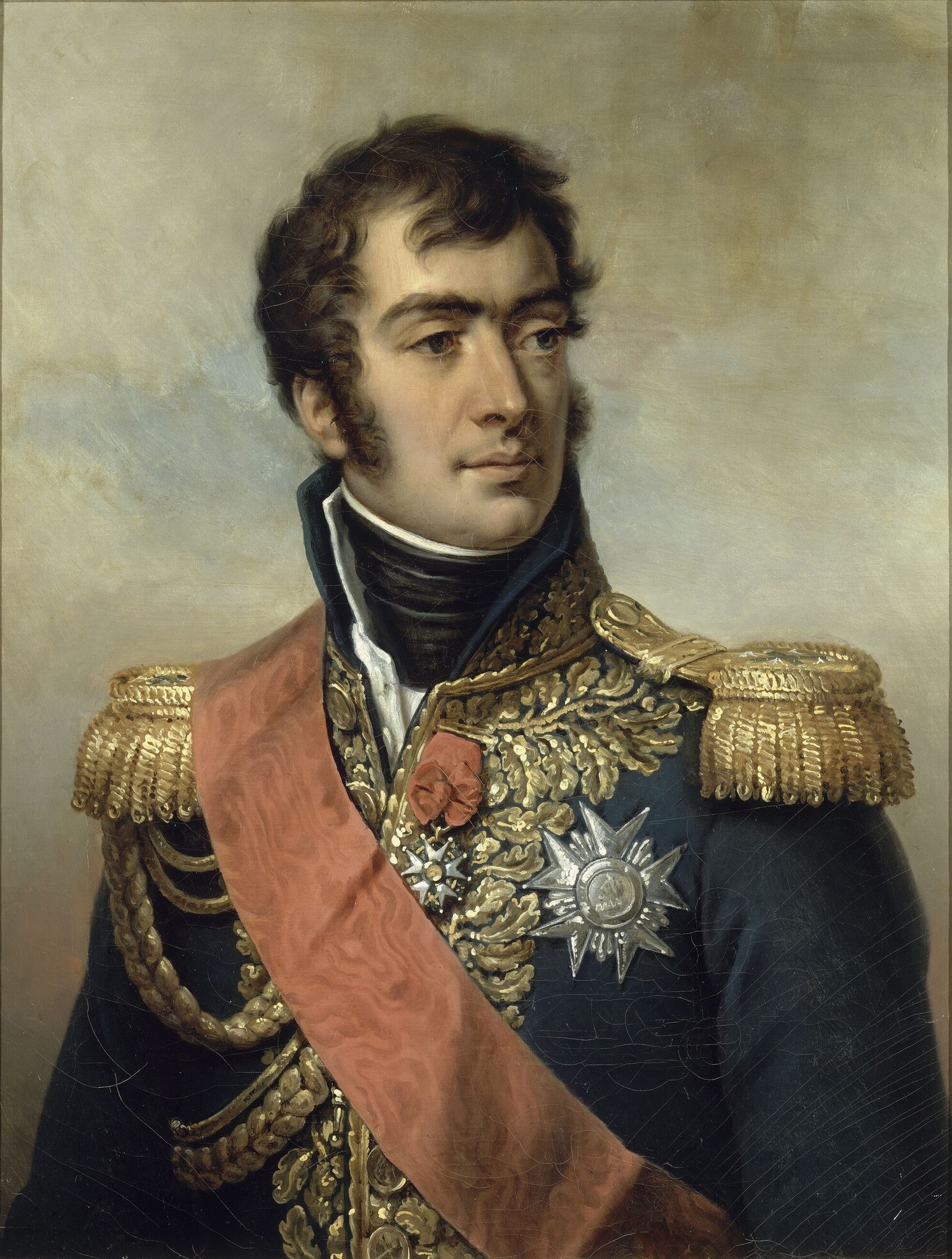
Auguste de Marmont

On 27 February the two French marshals burned the bridge at La Ferté-sous-Jouarre before crossing the river Marne at Triport. Once on the west bank, Mortier turned north toward Varreddes while Marmont moved east toward Meaux. Forming the rearguard, Étienne Pierre Sylvestre Ricard's 8th Infantry Division and Jean-Pierre Doumerc's cavalry repulsed Fabian Gottlieb von Osten-Sacken's pursuing troops and burned the bridge at Trilport. As Marmont's troops approached Meaux, they found Russians in possession. Sacken's Russian cavalry appeared at the first bridge at Meaux and routed the 1,600 French National Guards that defended the span. The Russians quickly fanned out into the city streets while a 4-gun battery began shelling the market place. Marmont quickly gathered up the nearest available body of French soldiers and led them in an attack that drove the Russians back to the bridge. French artillery rapidly moved through the city streets and silenced the Russian battery. The French sustained 100 casualties in the skirmish. Marmont finally gained control of the Meaux bridge and demolished it.

Earlier, Mortier detached a force of 300 cavalry and 500 infantry led by Henri Baltazard Vincent. Finding himself isolated at Château-Thierry, Vincent slipped out of the city on the night of 26 February. With Allied forces at large in the area, Vincent's soldiers abandoned the main roads and moved across country to reach Lizy-sur-Ourcq. In doing so, Vincent avoided Friedrich von Katzler's Prussian advanced guard which counted three cavalry regiments, three fusilier (light infantry) and two grenadier battalions, two jäger companies and a half-battery of artillery. During the day Katzler reached the Marne at La Ferté-sous-Jouarre and established a bridge at Sammeron. After crossing the river, Katzler found Vincent's force at Lizy-sur-Ourcq and drove it out of the village. Behind him, Friedrich Graf Kleist von Nollendorf's Prussian II Corps crossed to the north bank of the Marne.

Marmont and Mortier informed Joseph Bonaparte at Paris of their predicament; they were badly outnumbered and the capital was threatened. Raking up every available soldier from the Paris depots, Joseph immediately sent 1,300 foot soldiers and 100 lancers to the two marshals. Soon afterward, the 3,600-man 3rd Provisional Guard Infantry Division under Paul-Jean-Baptiste Poret de Morvan was organized and sent, together with 800 cavalry and 48 artillery pieces. After Blücher's army left his front, Napoleon was not sure of its intentions or direction. The French emperor left Marshal Claude Perrin Victor's corps at Méry-sur-Seine and Marshal Michel Ney's corps at Arcis-sur-Aube to watch to the north. On 26 February Napoleon reinforced Ney with Nicolas-François Roussel d'Hurbal's cavalry division and Pierre Boyer's infantry brigade. Even so, Napoleon did not believe Blücher was driving toward Paris. On the morning of 27 February, Napoleon finally received conclusive reports that Blücher's army was advancing on Paris and had gained a 3-day head start. The French emperor ordered Marshal Jacques MacDonald to take command of the 42,000 troops opposing Schwarzenberg along the river Aube. MacDonald would have the II, VII and XI Corps and the II Cavalry, V Cavalry and VI Cavalry Corps. Napoleon took 35,000 troops and began marching northwest toward Sézanne and La Ferté-Gaucher in Blücher's wake. At nightfall on 27 February, Victor, the Imperial Guard and Napoleon were in Sézanne while Ney's infantry, the Imperial Guard cavalry and Roussel's cavalry were in Esternay, west of Sézanne. The cavalry of Étienne Tardif de Pommeroux de Bordesoulle and the infantry of Jean-Toussaint Arrighi de Casanova were coming up on Ney's left flank.

== Battle ==
=== 28 February action ===
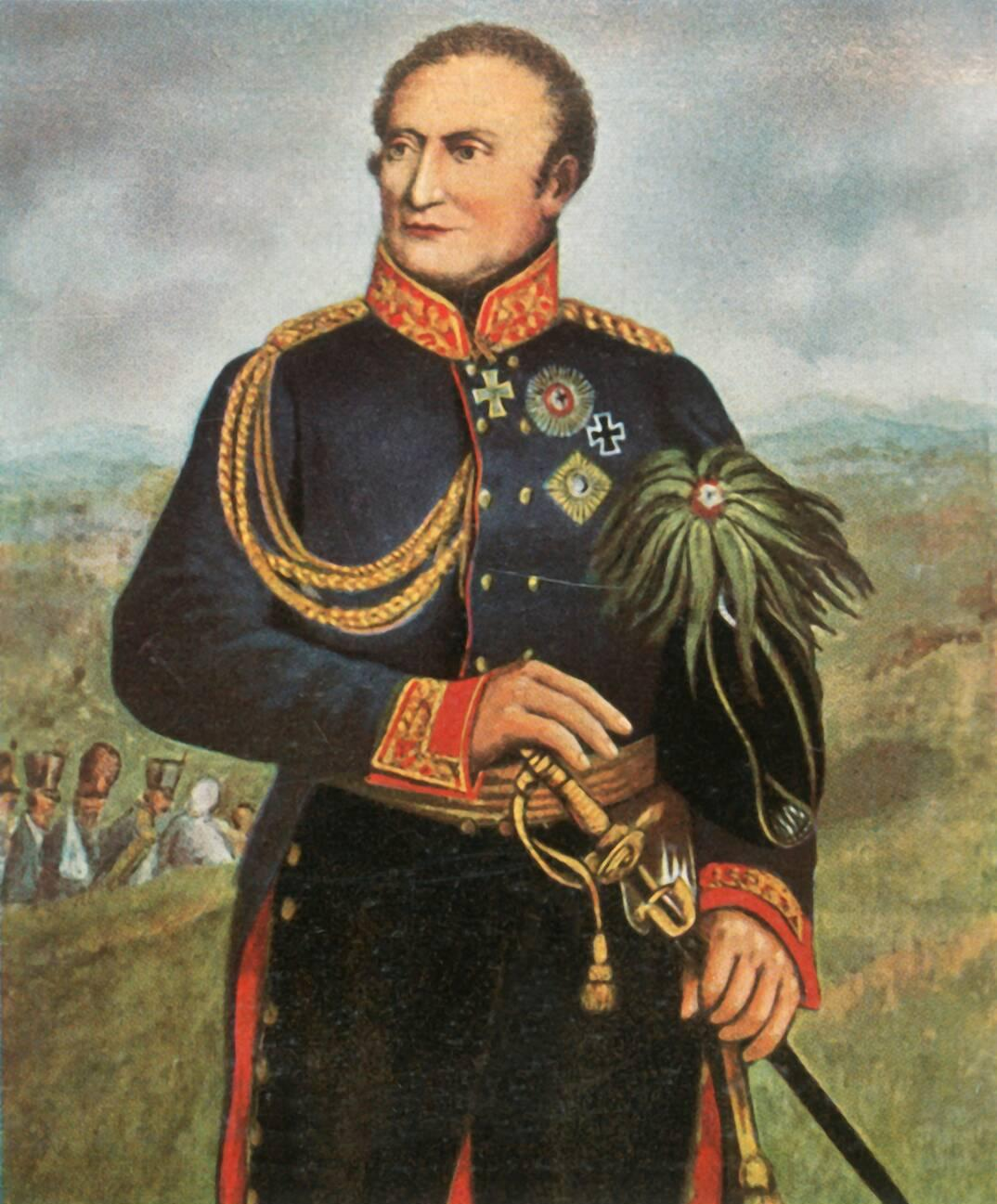
Friedrich von Kleist

Kleist's Prussians rebuilt the bridge over the river Ourcq at Lizy and crossed to the west bank. They swung left and moved southwest to the Thérouanne stream. Since Sacken had pulled back from Meaux, Marmont and Mortier deduced that Blücher intended to envelop their left flank near Lizy. Therefore, on 28 February the two marshals moved northeast toward Lizy where they knew Kleist spent the previous night. Leading Mortier's advanced guard, Vincent bumped into Kleist's forward positions at Gué-à-Tresmes at 4:00 pm. Farther west near Étrépilly, Vincent cavalry charged and threw back Katzeler's outpost line. The 2nd Old Guard Division under Charles-Joseph Christiani appeared in front of Gué-à-Tresmes and took the Prussian positions under fire with 24 artillery pieces. Katzeler had the Haase Combined Fusilier Battalion, the Fusilier Battalion of the 2nd West Prussian Regiment and the Hüllesheim Combined Musketeer Battalion in line to oppose the French. Kleist sent the Brandenburg Uhlans to guard Katzeler's left flank while ordering Colonel Blücher's cavalry brigade to support the right flank.

An artillery duel between French and Prussian cannons followed, during which Kleist formed his 9th and 10th Brigades on both sides of the main highway. Christiani sent his 1st Brigade to attack Gué-à-Tresmes in front while the Fusilier-Chasseur Regiment hit the village on the right side. The assault was successful in forcing the Linsingen Combined Battalion, the 2nd Silesian Combined Battalion and two more battalions to withdraw from Gué-à-Tresmes. As Kleist's corps withdrew to the northeast, the Prussians dismantled the bridge at Lizy. Mortier's corps swung to the right to face Lizy while Marmont's corps aggressively plunged after Kleist's men. The Prussian 9th Brigade made a stand at Le Plessis-Placy and a charge by one squadron of the Silesian Uhlans managed to stop two pursuing French battalions.

By midnight Kleist's corps was pushed behind the Gergogne stream. Back at Lizy, Mortier repulsed an assault by two regiments from Peter Mikhailovich Kaptzevich's Russian corps. Kleist believed that he faced Napoleon because the French soldiers yelled "Vive l'Empereur" (Long live the emperor). The French pursuit ended at 1:00 am on 1 March at May-en-Multien. By this hour the Prussian 9th Brigade was at Neufchelles and 10th Brigade farther north at Mareuil-sur-Ourcq. The Prussians lost 11 officers and 934 rank and file in the battle. A long artillery bombardment lasted until the next morning, punctuated by bursts of musketry. In this phase of the battle, Russian casualties numbered 400 men, the Prussians lost 150–200 and the French 80 soldiers. Historian Digby Smith estimated French losses as 250 and Prussian losses as 1,035 killed, wounded and missing.

=== 1 March action ===
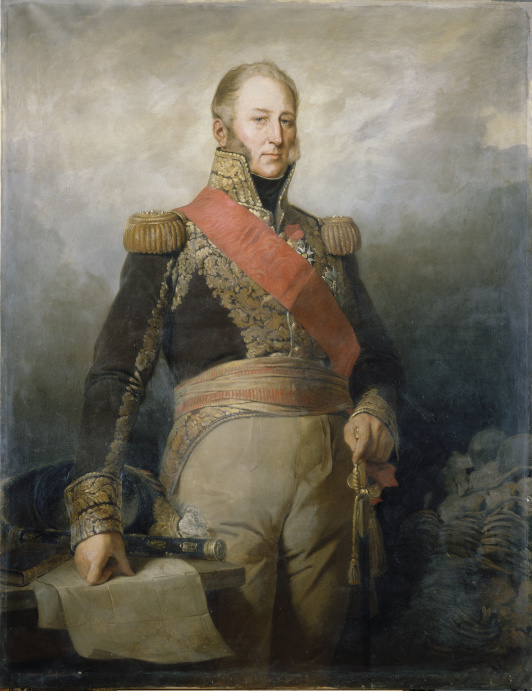
Édouard Mortier

Blücher received a report from Cossack commander Friedrich Karl von Tettenborn that Napoleon was approaching. Recalling his drubbing in the Six Days' Campaign at the beginning of February, the Prussian field marshal immediately began transferring his army to the north bank of the Marne. By 2:00 pm on 1 March, the guns of Napoleon's advanced guard were throwing shells across the river, but it was too late to catch the Allies. By 10:00 am that morning, Blücher's rear guard cavalry under Fyodor Karlovich Korf safely crossed to the north bank of the Marne. Blücher had hoped to fight Napoleon with the bulk of his army, while Kleist dealt with Marmont and Mortier. Since Kleist fumbled, the Prussian army commander ordered Kleist into action again while committing major units to attack Marmont and Mortier. Yorck's I Prussian Corps marched to Crouy-sur-Ourcq while Kaptzevich and Korf moved to Gesvres farther south. Sacken at Lizy-sur-Ourcq would cover the shift while the Army of Silesia's wagon and pontoon trains were ordered northeast to Gandelu, in case a retreat to Oulchy-le-Château became necessary.

While Napoleon was stalled by having to cross the Marne, Blücher planned to launch Yorck and Kaptzevich across the Ourcq at Crouy. Yorck found the Crouy bridge destroyed so he marched north to cross at Fulaines. Sacken was drawn into a noisy skirmish at Lizy and unable to lend support. Finding that his plans were not being carried out, at 6:00 pm Blücher ordered Kaptzevich to force a crossing at Gesvres. Despite being opposed by Doumerc's cavalry, the Russian corps commander pushed his leading elements onto the west bank. Marmont swiftly brought up his infantry and, after a stiff fight, overran Kaptzevich's small bridgehead, capturing 280–300 Russians. Kleist's attack also failed, leaving both sides in the same position as before. That night Poret de Morvan's division marched into the French camp accompanied by the rumble of 48 guns and loud cheers. Despite their great numerical advantage, the morale of the Allied soldiers sank.

== Result ==
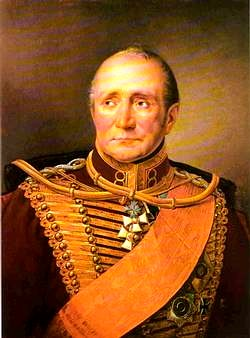
Hans von Zieten

On 2 March, Blücher began retreating north in the direction of Soissons. While Yorck withdrew through Château-Thierry, Kaptzevich pulled back to La Ferté-Milon and Sacken fell back to Ancienville. Bringing up the rear was Kleist, who was directed to send a probe south toward May-en-Multien. Led by Hans Ernst Karl, Graf von Zieten, the Silesian Hussars, Neumark Dragoons, Silesian Uhlans and two horse artillery batteries set out, supported by five battalions from the 9th Brigade. As the Prussian reconnaissance force emerged from Neufchelles, Christophe Antoine Merlin's 1st Light Cavalry Division charged them. Merlin was driven back but Ricard's 8th Division and Joseph Lagrange's 3rd Division soon appeared with 12 heavy caliber cannons. In the artillery duel that followed, six Prussian guns were knocked out of action and Zieten decided to retreat at 5:00 pm. Kleist fell back to Mareuil-sur-Ourcq but was unable to cross the river because the other corps had not passed. Not realizing the situation, Marmont did not press the Allies hard. Instead he simply bombarded Mareuil and Kleist got away.

Napoleon had no pontoon train, which slowed him down considerably. His army finally bridged the Marne at 2:00 am on 3 March, moving Louis Friant's 1st Old Guard Division, the Imperial Guard cavalry, Emmanuel de Grouchy's line cavalry and Ney's corps to the north bank. Napoleon directed Victor and Arrighi to march to Château-Thierry. On 3 March, Marmont and Mortier crossed the Ourcq at La Ferté-Milon. Napoleon's plan was to drive the Allies back towards Oulchy-le-Château. That day there was a skirmish at Neuilly-Saint-Front in which the French failed to trap the retreating Allies. Nevertheless, the French inflicted 500–600 casualties on Blücher's army. During the day Blücher attempted to get in touch with Bülow and Wintzingerode who he hoped to join. He finally decided to withdraw behind the river Aisne. The next major engagement would be the Battle of Craonne on 7 March 1814.

== Forces ==
=== French order of battle ===
14 Feb. to 17 Mar. 1814 organization of the Guard, VI Corps and I Cavalry Corps
Corps	Division	Brigade	Units
Guard Corps: Marshal Édouard Mortier	2nd Old Guard Division: General of Division; Charles-Joseph Christiani	Unknown commander	Fusilier Chasseur Regiment
Guard Corps: Marshal Édouard Mortier	2nd Old Guard Division: General of Division; Charles-Joseph Christiani	Unknown commander	Fusilier Grenadier Regiment
Guard Corps: Marshal Édouard Mortier	2nd Old Guard Division: General of Division; Charles-Joseph Christiani	Unknown commander	Vélites of Turin
Guard Corps: Marshal Édouard Mortier	2nd Old Guard Division: General of Division; Charles-Joseph Christiani	General of Brigade; Jean-Louis Gros	Flanqueur Chasseur Regiment
Guard Corps: Marshal Édouard Mortier	2nd Old Guard Division: General of Division; Charles-Joseph Christiani	General of Brigade; Jean-Louis Gros	Flanqueur Grenadier Regiment
Guard Corps: Marshal Édouard Mortier	2nd Old Guard Division: General of Division; Charles-Joseph Christiani	General of Brigade; Jean-Louis Gros	Vélites of Florence
Guard Corps: Marshal Édouard Mortier	2nd Young Guard Division: General of Division; Philibert Jean-Baptiste Curial (Note: Curial's division dramatically changed organization between 14 February and 17 March. The earlier units and the later commanders are shown. The only General Lagrange found in the sources (French Wikipedia, Broughton) was the one leading Marmont's 3rd Division.)	General of Brigade; Lagrange	5th Voltiguer Regiment
Guard Corps: Marshal Édouard Mortier	2nd Young Guard Division: General of Division; Philibert Jean-Baptiste Curial	General of Brigade; Lagrange	6th Voltiguer Regiment
Guard Corps: Marshal Édouard Mortier	2nd Young Guard Division: General of Division; Philibert Jean-Baptiste Curial	General of Brigade; Jacques Le Capitaine	7th Voltiguer Regiment
Guard Corps: Marshal Édouard Mortier	2nd Young Guard Division: General of Division; Philibert Jean-Baptiste Curial	General of Brigade; Jacques Le Capitaine	8th Voltiguer Regiment
VI Corps: Marshal Auguste de Marmont	3rd Division: General of Division; Joseph Lagrange	General of Brigade; Joseph Antoine de Joubert	23rd and 37th Light Infantry Regiments
VI Corps: Marshal Auguste de Marmont	3rd Division: General of Division; Joseph Lagrange	General of Brigade; Joseph Antoine de Joubert	15th and 16th Line Infantry Regiments
VI Corps: Marshal Auguste de Marmont	3rd Division: General of Division; Joseph Lagrange	General of Brigade; Joseph Antoine de Joubert	70th and 121st Line Infantry Regiments
VI Corps: Marshal Auguste de Marmont	3rd Division: General of Division; Joseph Lagrange	General of Brigade; Jean-Louis Fournier	1st and 62nd Line Infantry Regiments
VI Corps: Marshal Auguste de Marmont	3rd Division: General of Division; Joseph Lagrange	General of Brigade; Jean-Louis Fournier	132nd Line Infantry Regiment
VI Corps: Marshal Auguste de Marmont	3rd Division: General of Division; Joseph Lagrange	General of Brigade; Jean-Louis Fournier	1st, 2nd, 3rd and 4th Marine Regiments
VI Corps: Marshal Auguste de Marmont	8th Division: General of Division; Étienne Pierre Sylvestre Ricard	General of Brigade; Pierre Pelleport	6th Light Infantry Regiment
VI Corps: Marshal Auguste de Marmont	8th Division: General of Division; Étienne Pierre Sylvestre Ricard	General of Brigade; Pierre Pelleport	4th and 6th Line Infantry Regiments
VI Corps: Marshal Auguste de Marmont	8th Division: General of Division; Étienne Pierre Sylvestre Ricard	General of Brigade; Pierre Pelleport	136th Line Infantry Regiment
VI Corps: Marshal Auguste de Marmont	8th Division: General of Division; Étienne Pierre Sylvestre Ricard	General of Brigade; Pierre Clavel	6th and 19th Light Infantry Regiments
VI Corps: Marshal Auguste de Marmont	8th Division: General of Division; Étienne Pierre Sylvestre Ricard	General of Brigade; Pierre Clavel	138th and 144th Line Infantry Regiments
VI Corps: Marshal Auguste de Marmont	1st Cavalry Division: General of Division; Jean-Pierre Doumerc (Note: Doumerc's division is omitted by Nafziger but its composition is listed in Smith.)	General of Brigade; Cyrille Simon Picquet	1st Gardes d'Honneur Regiment
VI Corps: Marshal Auguste de Marmont	1st Cavalry Division: General of Division; Jean-Pierre Doumerc	General of Brigade; Cyrille Simon Picquet	10th Hussar Regiment
VI Corps: Marshal Auguste de Marmont	1st Cavalry Division: General of Division; Jean-Pierre Doumerc	Unknown	1st Provisional Hussar Regiment
VI Corps: Marshal Auguste de Marmont	1st Cavalry Division: General of Division; Jean-Pierre Doumerc	Unknown	2nd, 3rd and 4th Provisional Chasseurs à Cheval Regiments
I Cavalry Corps: General of Division; Étienne Tardif de Bordesoulle	1st Light Cavalry Division: General of Division; Christophe Antoine Merlin	General of Brigade; Pierre François Antoine Huber	6th, 7th and 8th Hussar Regiments
I Cavalry Corps: General of Division; Étienne Tardif de Bordesoulle	1st Light Cavalry Division: General of Division; Christophe Antoine Merlin	General of Brigade; Pierre François Antoine Huber	1st, 3rd and 5th Chevau-léger Lancer Regiments
I Cavalry Corps: General of Division; Étienne Tardif de Bordesoulle	1st Light Cavalry Division: General of Division; Christophe Antoine Merlin	General of Brigade; Pierre François Antoine Huber	7th and 8th Chevau-léger Lancer Regiments
I Cavalry Corps: General of Division; Étienne Tardif de Bordesoulle	1st Light Cavalry Division: General of Division; Christophe Antoine Merlin	General of Brigade; Antoine Latour-Foissac	1st, 2nd and 3rd Chasseurs à Cheval Regiments
I Cavalry Corps: General of Division; Étienne Tardif de Bordesoulle	1st Light Cavalry Division: General of Division; Christophe Antoine Merlin	General of Brigade; Antoine Latour-Foissac	6th, 8th and 9th Chasseurs à Cheval Regiments
I Cavalry Corps: General of Division; Étienne Tardif de Bordesoulle	1st Light Cavalry Division: General of Division; Christophe Antoine Merlin	General of Brigade; Antoine Latour-Foissac	16th and 25th Chasseurs à Cheval Regiments
I Cavalry Corps: General of Division; Étienne Tardif de Bordesoulle	1st Heavy Cavalry Division: General of Division; Étienne Tardif de Bordesoulle	General of Brigade; Nicolas Marin Thiry	2nd and 3rd Cuirassier Regiments
I Cavalry Corps: General of Division; Étienne Tardif de Bordesoulle	1st Heavy Cavalry Division: General of Division; Étienne Tardif de Bordesoulle	General of Brigade; Nicolas Marin Thiry	6th and 9th Cuirassier Regiments
I Cavalry Corps: General of Division; Étienne Tardif de Bordesoulle	1st Heavy Cavalry Division: General of Division; Étienne Tardif de Bordesoulle	General of Brigade; Nicolas Marin Thiry	11th and 12th Cuirassier Regiments
I Cavalry Corps: General of Division; Étienne Tardif de Bordesoulle	1st Heavy Cavalry Division: General of Division; Étienne Tardif de Bordesoulle	General of Brigade; Joseph Alexandre Félix Laville	4th, 7th and 14th Cuirassier Regiments
I Cavalry Corps: General of Division; Étienne Tardif de Bordesoulle	1st Heavy Cavalry Division: General of Division; Étienne Tardif de Bordesoulle	General of Brigade; Joseph Alexandre Félix Laville	7th and 23rd Dragoon Regiments
I Cavalry Corps: General of Division; Étienne Tardif de Bordesoulle	1st Heavy Cavalry Division: General of Division; Étienne Tardif de Bordesoulle	General of Brigade; Joseph Alexandre Félix Laville	28th and 30th Dragoon Regiments

=== Allied order of battle ===
16–24 February 1814 organization of the II Corps and Katzler's Brigade
Corps	Division	Brigade	Units
II Corps: General-Leutnant; Friedrich Kleist von Nollendorf; 9,800 men	Infantry	9th Brigade: Generalmajor Franz Friedrich von Klüx	1st West Prussian Infantry Regiment (1st, 2nd and Fusilier Battalions)
II Corps: General-Leutnant; Friedrich Kleist von Nollendorf; 9,800 men	Infantry	9th Brigade: Generalmajor Franz Friedrich von Klüx	6th Reserve Infantry Regiment (two battalions)
II Corps: General-Leutnant; Friedrich Kleist von Nollendorf; 9,800 men	Infantry	9th Brigade: Generalmajor Franz Friedrich von Klüx	Silesian National Hussar Regiment (four squadrons)
II Corps: General-Leutnant; Friedrich Kleist von Nollendorf; 9,800 men	Infantry	9th Brigade: Generalmajor Franz Friedrich von Klüx	7th Silesian Landwehr Cavalry Regiment (four squadrons)
II Corps: General-Leutnant; Friedrich Kleist von Nollendorf; 9,800 men	Infantry	9th Brigade: Generalmajor Franz Friedrich von Klüx	6-pounder Foot Battery Nr. 7 (Eight 6-pound cannons)
II Corps: General-Leutnant; Friedrich Kleist von Nollendorf; 9,800 men	Infantry	10th Brigade: Generalmajor Georg Dubislav von Pirch	2nd West Prussian Infantry Regiment (1st, 2nd and Fusilier Battalions)
II Corps: General-Leutnant; Friedrich Kleist von Nollendorf; 9,800 men	Infantry	10th Brigade: Generalmajor Georg Dubislav von Pirch	Combined Fusilier Battalion von Haase
II Corps: General-Leutnant; Friedrich Kleist von Nollendorf; 9,800 men	Infantry	10th Brigade: Generalmajor Georg Dubislav von Pirch	2nd Silesian Infantry Regiment (one battalion)
II Corps: General-Leutnant; Friedrich Kleist von Nollendorf; 9,800 men	Infantry	10th Brigade: Generalmajor Georg Dubislav von Pirch	7th Reserve Infantry Regiment (one battalion)
II Corps: General-Leutnant; Friedrich Kleist von Nollendorf; 9,800 men	Infantry	10th Brigade: Generalmajor Georg Dubislav von Pirch	1st Silesian Infantry Regiment (one battalion)
II Corps: General-Leutnant; Friedrich Kleist von Nollendorf; 9,800 men	Infantry	10th Brigade: Generalmajor Georg Dubislav von Pirch	Schützen Battalion (two companies)
II Corps: General-Leutnant; Friedrich Kleist von Nollendorf; 9,800 men	Infantry	10th Brigade: Generalmajor Georg Dubislav von Pirch	2nd Silesian Hussar Regiment (four squadrons)
II Corps: General-Leutnant; Friedrich Kleist von Nollendorf; 9,800 men	Infantry	10th Brigade: Generalmajor Georg Dubislav von Pirch	8th Silesian Landwehr Cavalry Regiment (four squadrons)
II Corps: General-Leutnant; Friedrich Kleist von Nollendorf; 9,800 men	Infantry	10th Brigade: Generalmajor Georg Dubislav von Pirch	6-pounder Foot Battery Nr. 8 (Eight 6-pound cannons)
II Corps: General-Leutnant; Friedrich Kleist von Nollendorf; 9,800 men	Cavalry Reserve: General-Leutnant Hans Ernst von Zieten	Lieutenant Colonel von Blücher	Neumark Dragoon Regiment (four squadrons)
II Corps: General-Leutnant; Friedrich Kleist von Nollendorf; 9,800 men	Cavalry Reserve: General-Leutnant Hans Ernst von Zieten	Lieutenant Colonel von Blücher	1st Silesian Hussar Regiment (four squadrons)
II Corps: General-Leutnant; Friedrich Kleist von Nollendorf; 9,800 men	Cavalry Reserve: General-Leutnant Hans Ernst von Zieten	Major von Wrangel	Grand Duke Constantine Cuirassier Regiment (four squadrons)
II Corps: General-Leutnant; Friedrich Kleist von Nollendorf; 9,800 men	Cavalry Reserve: General-Leutnant Hans Ernst von Zieten	Major von Wrangel	Brandenburg Cuirassier Regiment (four squadrons)
II Corps: General-Leutnant; Friedrich Kleist von Nollendorf; 9,800 men	Cavalry Reserve: General-Leutnant Hans Ernst von Zieten	Lieutenant Colonel von Haacke	Silesian Cuirassier Regiment (four squadrons)
II Corps: General-Leutnant; Friedrich Kleist von Nollendorf; 9,800 men	Cavalry Reserve: General-Leutnant Hans Ernst von Zieten	Lieutenant Colonel von Haacke	Silesian Uhlan Regiment (four squadrons)
II Corps: General-Leutnant; Friedrich Kleist von Nollendorf; 9,800 men	Cavalry Reserve: General-Leutnant Hans Ernst von Zieten	Horse Artillery	Horse Batteries Nr. 7 and Nr. 8 (16 6-pound cannons)
II Corps: General-Leutnant; Friedrich Kleist von Nollendorf; 9,800 men	Artillery Reserve: Lieutenant Colonel von Lehmann		Horse Batteries Nr. 9 and Nr. 10 (16 6-pound cannons)
II Corps: General-Leutnant; Friedrich Kleist von Nollendorf; 9,800 men	Artillery Reserve: Lieutenant Colonel von Lehmann		6-pounder Batteries Nr. 9 and Nr. 11 (16 6-pound cannons)
II Corps: General-Leutnant; Friedrich Kleist von Nollendorf; 9,800 men	Artillery Reserve: Lieutenant Colonel von Lehmann		7-pounder Howitzer Battery Nr. 1
I Corps: General-Leutnant; Ludwig Yorck von Wartenburg	Cavalry Reserve: Generalmajor Georg von Jürgass	Generalmajor Friedrich von Katzler	Brandenburg Hussar Regiment (four squadrons)
I Corps: General-Leutnant; Ludwig Yorck von Wartenburg	Cavalry Reserve: Generalmajor Georg von Jürgass	Generalmajor Friedrich von Katzler	Brandenburg Uhlan Regiment (four squadrons)

== Notes ==
Footnotes

Citations
