= Ourcq Canal =

Canal in northeastern France

Coordinates: 48.9539°N 2.6325°E

Canal de l'Ourcq
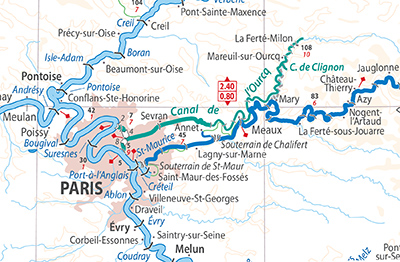
- Location of the Canal de l'Ourcq in relation to Paris and the rivers Marne and Seine (from the European Waterways Map & Directory, 5th ed., Transmanche)
- Interactive map of Canal de l'Ourcq

Specifications
- Length: 108.1 km (67.2 mi)
- Locks: 5

History
- Date approved: 1802
- Date completed: 1822

Geography
- Start point: Port-aux-Perches near the village of Troesnes
- End point: Bassin de la Villette
- Connects to: Ourcq, Canal Saint-Martin

Location of the junction of the three canals at the Bassin de la Villette in Paris; the Canal Saint-Denis heads northwest to Saint-Denis, and the Canal Saint-Martin south to the Arsenal basin.

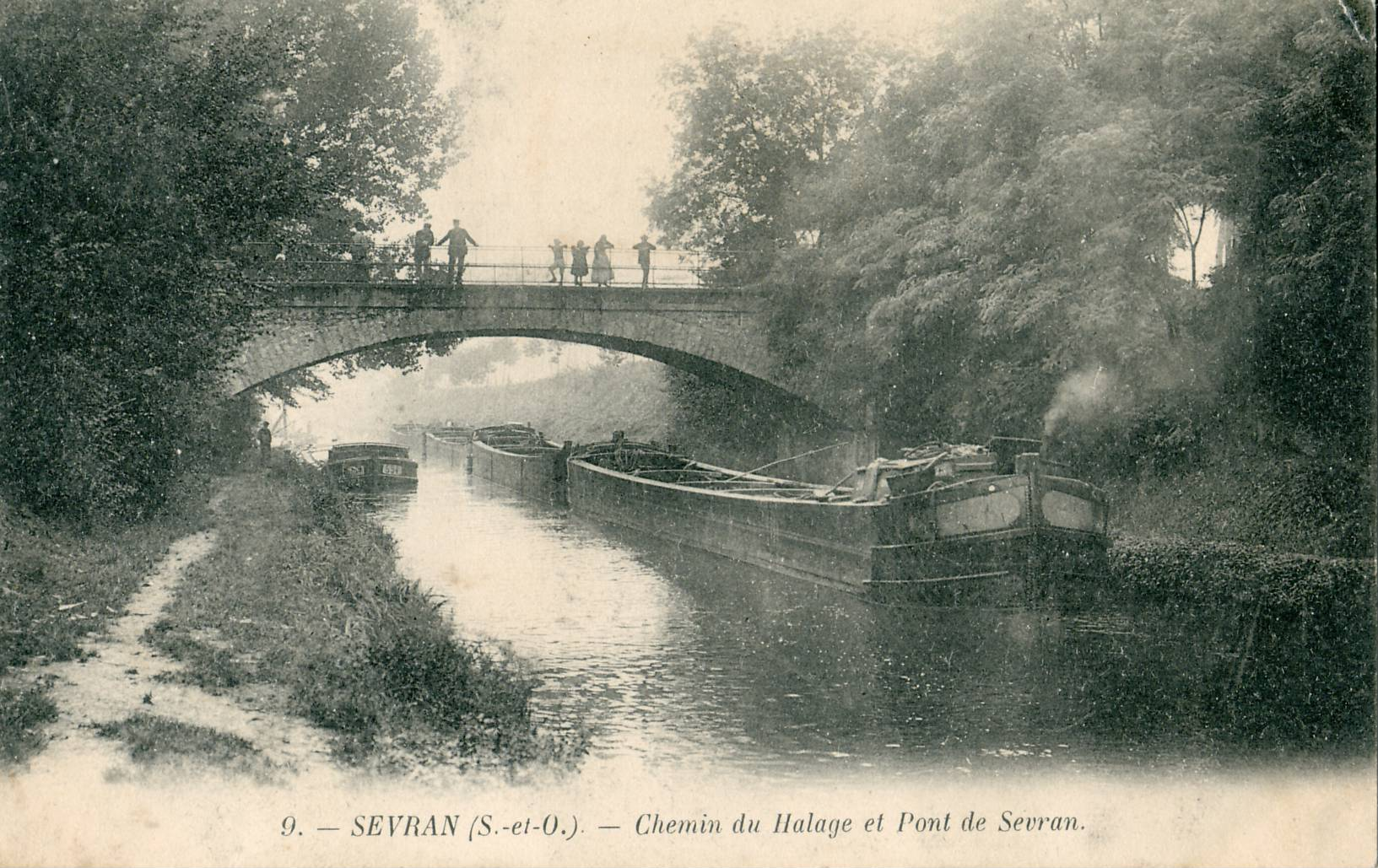
The canal at the beginning of the 20th century.

The Canal de l'Ourcq (French pronunciation: [kanal də luʁk]) is a 108.1 km (67.2 mi) long canal in the Île-de-France region (greater Paris) with 10 locks. It was built at a width of 3.20 m (10.5 ft) but was enlarged to 3.7 m (12 ft), which permitted use by more pleasure boats. The canal begins at Port-aux-Perches near the village of Troesnes, where it splits from the channeled river Ourcq, and flows to the Bassin de la Villette, where it joins the Canal Saint-Martin. Paris requires 380,000 cubic metres (84,000,000 imp gal; 100,000,000 US gal) of water daily for cleaning the sewer system, gutters, and parks. The Canal de l'Ourcq provides about half of the requirement. Since 1983, the waterway has been designated for use by pleasure craft, and its water is designated for non-drinking uses.

The canal is considered part of the 130 km (81 mi) Parisian canal network, along with the Canal Saint-Denis, the bassin de la Villette, and the Canal Saint-Martin. The canals were created as part of the administrative management of water in Paris during the nineteenth century.

== Geography ==
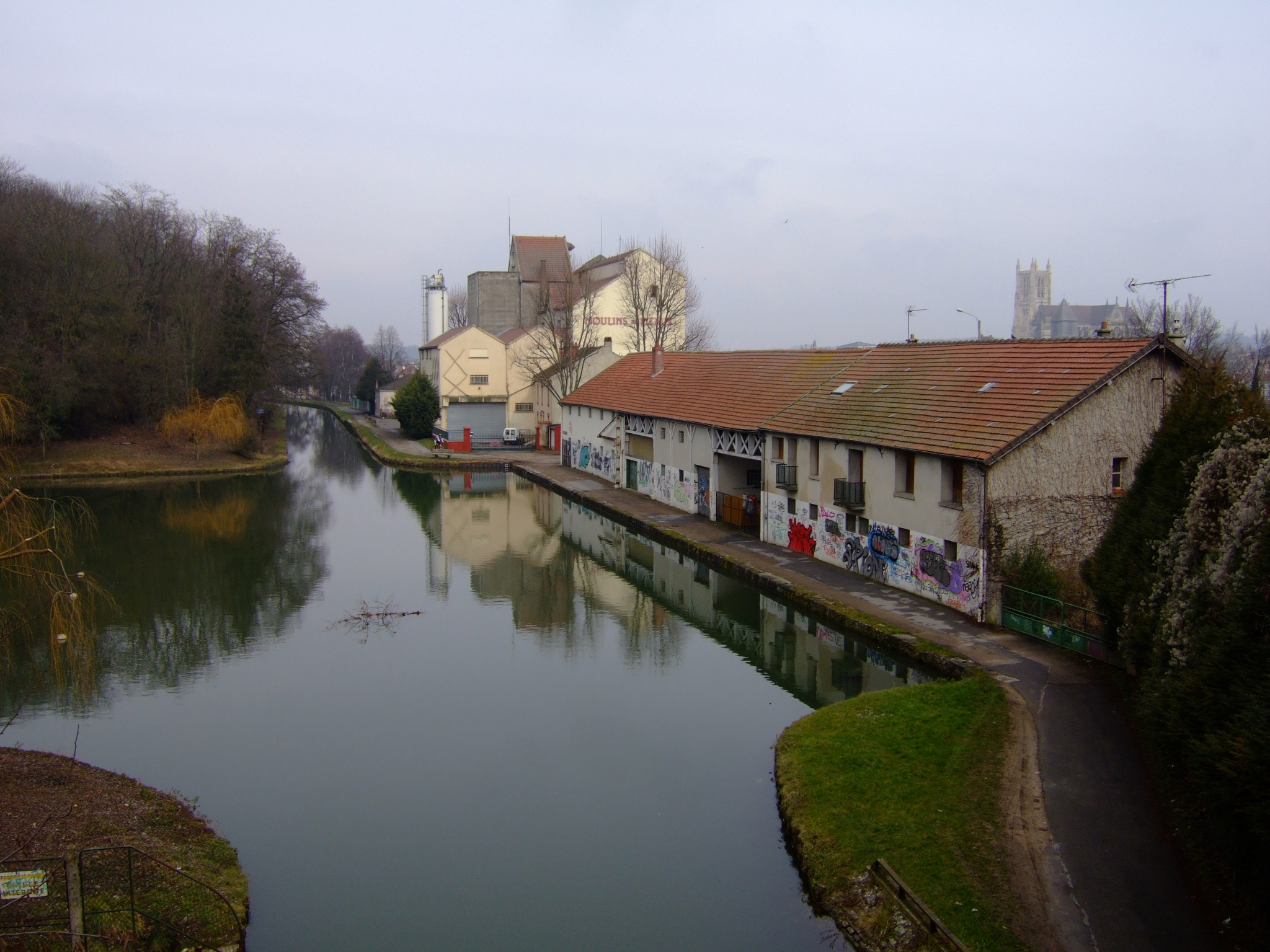
The canal at Meaux

The river Ourcq's headwaters are located in the wet prairie near Fère-en-Tardenois in the Aisne département. The river is canalized in Silly-la-Poterie. Its water then follows an 87 km (54 mi) course through the valley and empties into the Marne near Lizy-sur-Ourcq. Pipework diverts the river from Mareuil-sur-Ourcq, where most of the water flows to Paris via the current canal.

== History ==
=== The river Ourcq ===
The first efforts towards engineering the waterway were inspired by the need for firewood for heating in Paris. The Valois and Orléans families owned a large tract of forest, and in 1560 a plan was devised to carry wood via a system of simple locks. In 1661, Louis XIV allowed tolls to be collected along the Ourcq, payable to Philippe d'Orléans.

=== Potable water in Paris ===
When Paris was known as Lutetia, the inhabitants of île Saint-Louis used water from the Seine. In the Gallo-Roman era, while the montagne Sainte-Geneviève was occupied, the water quality began to deteriorate and people began to frequent the Roman Baths or public baths.

During the 4th century, construction of the aqueduc d’Arcueil began under Emperor Julian the Apostate. This structure directed water to the Cluny Baths. After the fall of Rome, the aqueducts, to a large extent, were destroyed. For four centuries, from the Merovingian to the Carolingian the waters of the Seine were used, mainly from sources at Belleville and Le Pré-Saint-Gervais. King Philip II, while establishing the Halles de Paris, a sheltered marketplace, had two fountains built in order to aid construction.

By the 18th century, little improvements had been made to bring potable water to Paris. Engineer Pierre-Paul Riquet proposed building a canal from the Ourcq, however his suggestion was not implemented before his death in 1680.

=== Construction of the canal ===
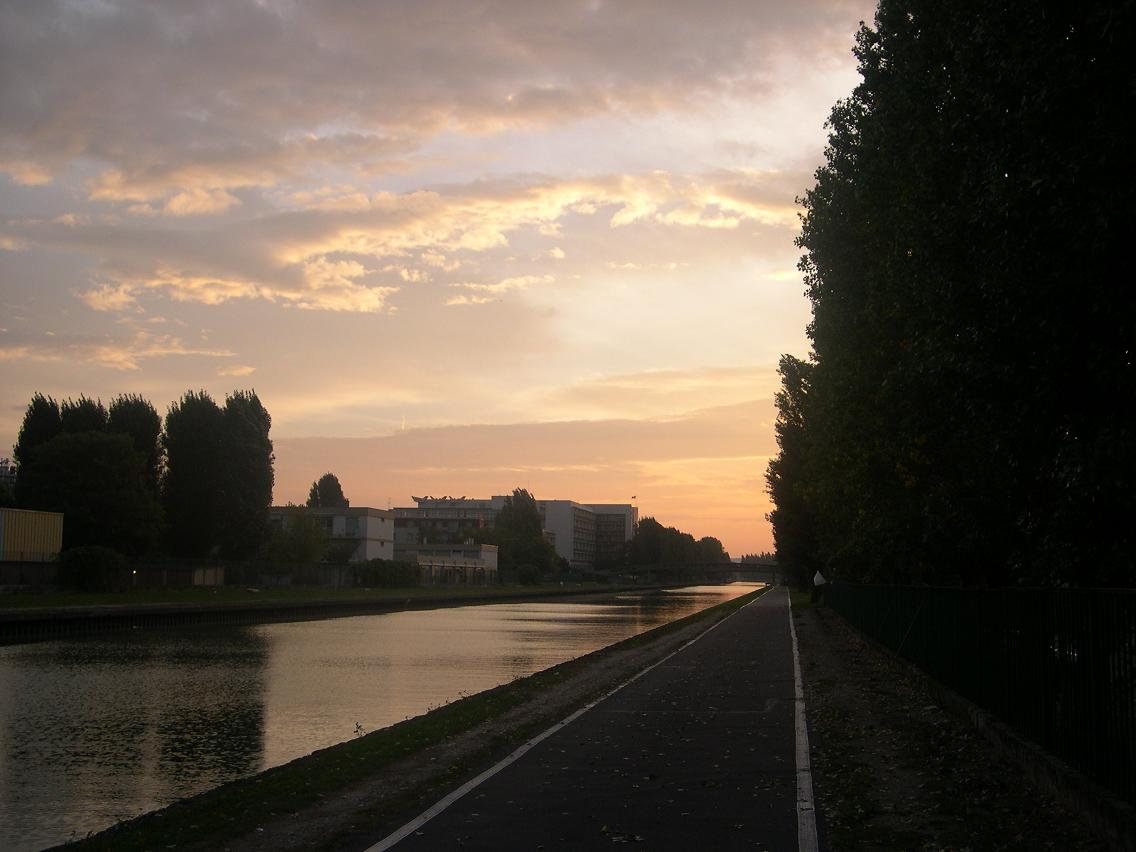
Sunset along the canal at Bondy

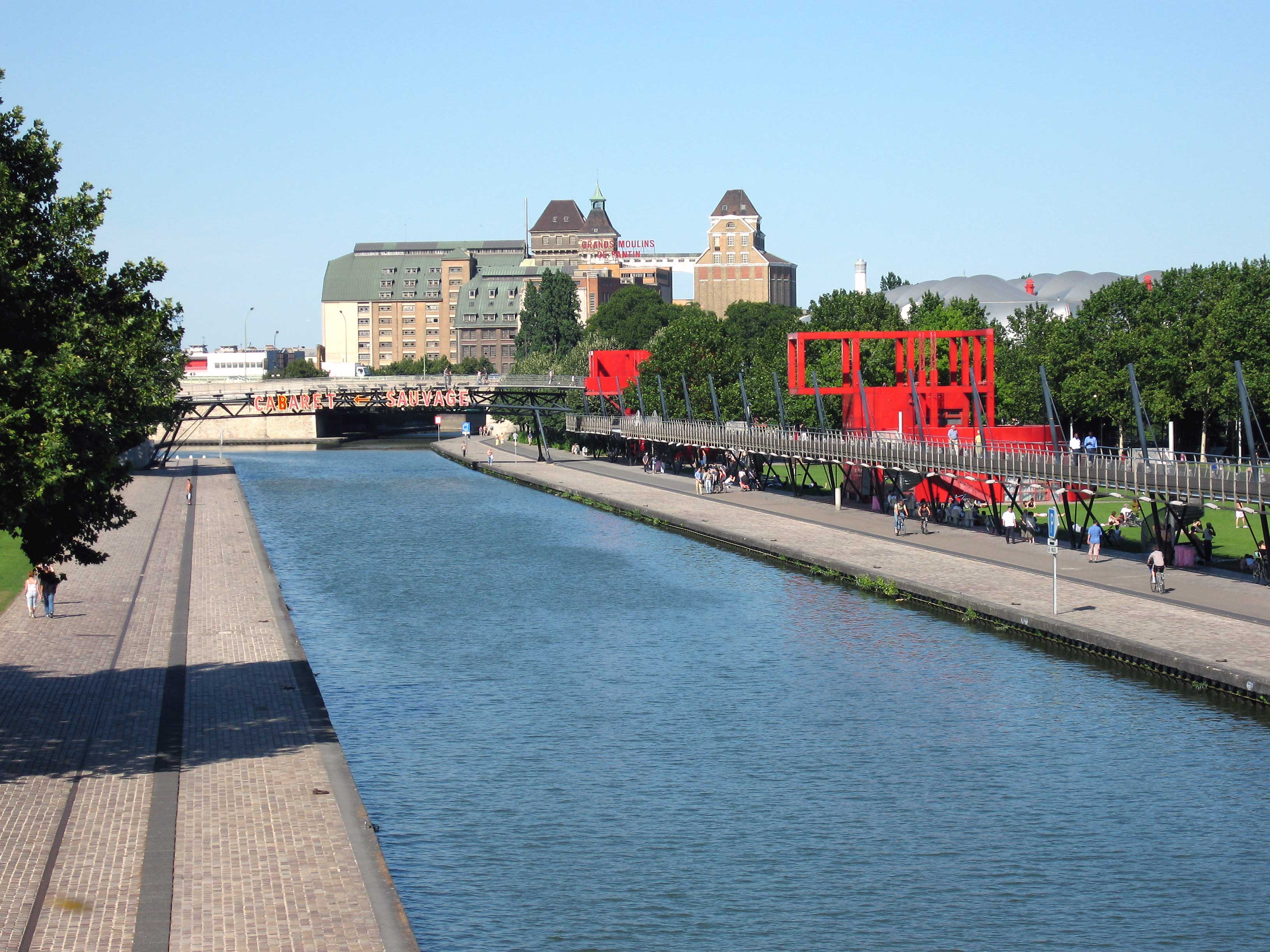
The Canal de l'Ourcq as seen from the Parc de la Villette. In the background are the Grands Moulins de Pantin

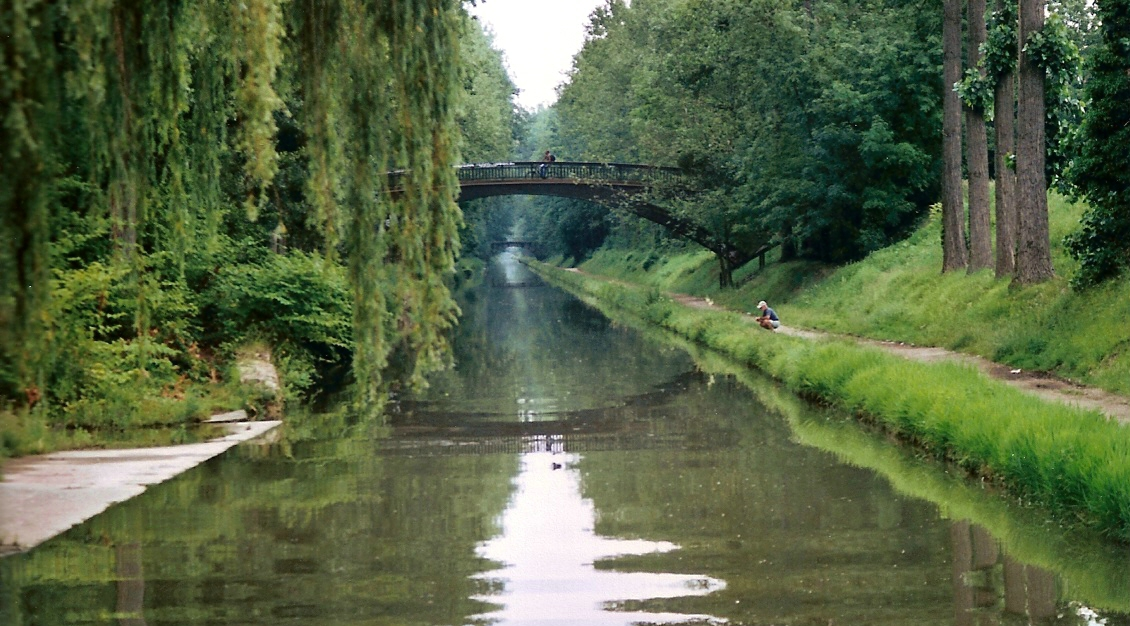
Looking east along the canal as it passes through the Sevran forest park.

On 19 May 1802, Napoleon Bonaparte ordered the creation of the canal. Specifically, he decreed that the Seine be diverted from below the Bassin de l'Arsenal to the Bassin de la Villette. The canals would have the dual purposes of providing shipping channels which avoided the Seine and bringing water to Paris. Funding was secured via a grant and supplemental wine taxes, and the first stone was laid on 23 September. Napoleon appointed Pierre-Simon Girard to direct the project and work was undertaken in January 1804. The design of the canal called for a structure in which the water was both slowmoving, to aid navigation, and non-stagnant, in order to provide healthy drinking water. The canal was also intended to feed the Canal Saint-Martin and Canal Saint-Denis. The projected confluence would enable easier navigation through the city centre, as the Seine was not yet dammed, and the canal would provide an alternate route.

Private financiers were awarded the contract to construct and manage the canals. The city of Paris agreed to purchase land and surrender tolls for 99 years to the firms building the canals (the cost of construction was estimated at 6 million francs). Work began in 1805 under Édouard de Villiers du Terrage. The bassin de la Villette was filled with water on 2 December 1808, and on 15 August 1813 the first boat traveled through the canal. After the fall of the French Empire, work stopped until the Bourbon Restoration in 1814. The monarchy contracted with the Compagnie Vassel et Saint-Didier for 99 years, which allowed the company to collect tolls along the property, but required that the canal be completed and maintained. It was then realized that the slope was steep, causing too strong a current. Engineer Marie-Émile Vuigner added five locks to make navigation possible. The canal was opened to navigation in 1822.

According to a 1989 survey of ship lifts, from the Permanent International Association of Navigation Congresses (PIANC), in 1893 a canal inclined plane was constructed on the canal, near Meaux. It was only capable of lifting vessels 70 tons and 24 metres length. The vertical lift was 12.2 metres.

Under the reign of Napoleon III, water shortages caused boats to become stranded along the canal. In response, authority was given to take water from the Marne. In 1895 construction began to widen the canal in order for it to accommodate 1,000 tonne vessels. In 1920 this widening was extended to Les Pavillons-sous-Bois. Today the canal provides approximately half of the 380,000 cubic metres (500,000 cu yd) daily water requirement for the city's public works.

=== Developments ===
In February 2005, the Council of Paris launched a study on construction of a proposed port along the Canal de l'Ourcq. This would be on the widened section from La Villette to Pavillons-sous-Bois (11 km or 6.8 mi) which is navigable by Seine barges carrying up to 900 tonnes. The port would facilitate the transportation of material processed by the Romainville waste treatment centre managed by the metropolitan waste collection and disposal agency SYCTOM. This would avoid the need for trucks to carry this waste. In addition to the quay for barges to load and unload, the port would have facilities for reception, sorting, and shipping of bulky objects, as well as servicing waste containers from the domestic waste sorting and collection facilities.
