= Peter Kaptzevich =

Russian general

Peter Mikhailovich Kaptzevich
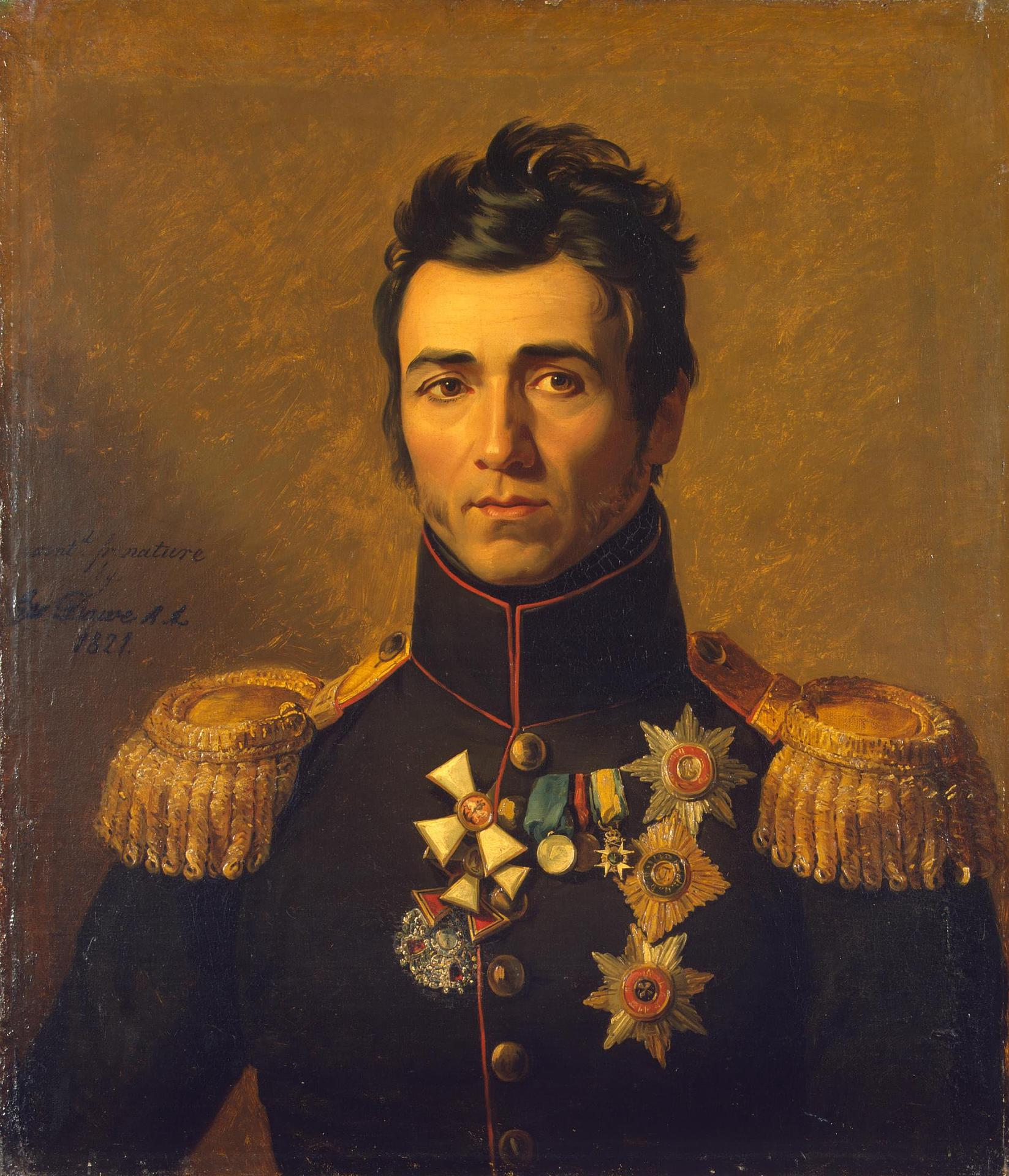
- Portrait by George Dawe
- Born: 1772; Pereiaslav, Cossack Hetmanate
- Died: 3 July 1840 (aged 67–68); Nikolskoye, Sakmarsky District, Orenburg Oblast, Russian Empire
- Military career
- Allegiance: (Russia) Russian Empire
- Branch: Infantry
- Rank: General of the Artillery
- Commands: 7th Infantry Division; 10th Army Corps; Separate Siberian Corps; Separate Corps of Internal Guard
- Conflicts: See list: Caucasian War; Battle of Khankala; French invasion of Russia; Battle of Smolensk; Battle of Borodino; Battle of Tarutino; Battle of Maloyaroslavets; Battle of Krasnoi; War of the Sixth Coalition; Battle of Katzbach; Battle of Leipzig; Battle of Vauchamps; Battle of Gué-à-Tresmes; Battle of Laon; Battle of Paris; Hundred Days
- Awards: Order of Saint Vladimir; Order of Saint George; Golden Weapon for Bravery; Order of St. Alexander Nevsky; Order of the Red Eagle; Order of the Sword

Peter Mikhailovich Kaptzevich (Russian: Пётр Михайлович Капцевич; 1772 – 3 July 1840) was a Russian general who participated in the Napoleonic Wars. He took part in the battles of Smolensk, Maloyaroslavets, Leipzig, and others. He led a Russian infantry corps during the 1814 Campaign in France. He was also the governor-general of Western Siberia from 1822 to 1827.

== Early life ==
Peter Mikhailovich was born in 1772 in Pereiaslav. His family, the Kaptzevich/Koptzevich/Kopetz (Капцевич, Копцевич, Копец) originated from a man named Foma (d. 1689), and his son Lavrentiy Fomovich "Honenko" (fl. 1735–37), a soldier.

== Early military career ==
Kaptzevich he began serving in the Gatchina forces in 1792, being promoted to Colonel in 1797 and to Major General in December of that same year. 2 years later he was promoted to Lieutenant General. From 1803 to 1810 he served in the Caucasus. Kaptzevich participated in the Battle of Khankala in 1807, for which he was awarded the Order of Saint Vladimir, 3rd Class. In 1810 he was appointed commander of the 7th Infantry Division.

== Napoleonic Wars ==
In 1812, Kaptzevich led the division at the Battle of Smolensk, for which he was awarded the Order of Saint Vladimir, 2nd class. During the Battle of Borodino he commanded the 8th corps in place of General Dmitry Dokhturov and was awarded the Order of St. George, 3rd class. During the retreat from Moscow, while engaged in various rearguard actions, he commanded the cavalry that was in the rearguard while holding off French forces. He took part in the Battle of Tarutino on the 18th of October. He was awarded with the Golden Weapon for Bravery for his actions during the Battle of Maloyaroslavets. He took part in the Battle of Krasnoi in November. After being promoted to command the 10th Army Corps in early 1813, he participated in the Battle of Katzbach. During the Battle of Goldberg, Kaptzevich captured 2,000 French soldiers. For all the battles in Silesia he was awarded the Order of St. Alexander Nevsky, the Prussian Order of the Red Eagle, 1st Class, and the Swedish Order of the Sword, 2nd Class. Kaptzevich was badly wounded in the Battle of Leipzig in his left thigh, for his actions during the battle he was awarded the 2nd Class of the Order of Saint George. In 1814, he participated in the battles of Vauchamps, Gué-à-Tresmes, Laon and Paris. He also took part in the Hundred Days war of 1815, after which he retired.

== Later career ==
In 1819, Kaptzevich came out of retirement and was appointed commander of the Separate Siberian Corps, and in 1822 he was appointed governor-general of Western Siberia. In 1823 he was promoted to General of the Infantry. Kaptzevich introduced public arable farming and public mills: the harvest collected by the Cossacks was distributed among them, the surplus was sold, and the proceeds went to maintaining their households and buying equipment. He created two external districts with centers in Kokshetau and Karkaraly, which included volosts that united Kazakh auls that voluntarily accepted the new system of government proposed by him. This significantly strengthened the position of the Russian Empire in Central Asia. He remained governor of Western Siberia until 1827. From September 29, 1828, he commanded the Separate Corps of Internal Guard. During his 12 years of commanding the corps, Kaptzevich managed to significantly raise the quality level of the internal guard personnel, mainly due to young recruits who were enrolled in garrison battalions. In 1835 he was given the rank of General of the Artillery. He died on July 3 (15), 1840 and was buried in the village of Nikolskoye, Sakmarsky District, Orenburg Oblast, next to the church.

== Decorations ==
- Order of Saint Vladimir
- Order of Saint George
- Golden Weapon for Bravery
- Order of St. Alexander Nevsky
- Order of the Red Eagle
- Order of the Sword

== Sources ==
- Модзалевский, Вадим Львович (1910). "Капцевичи". "Малороссийский родословник". Том 2 (стр. 250-495, Искры – Коссовичи). Archived from the original on 2019-04-02.
