= Battle of Khankala (1807) =

Military action of Caucasian War

Coordinates: 43.312°N 45.6889°E

Battle of Khankala(1807)
- Part of Caucasian War
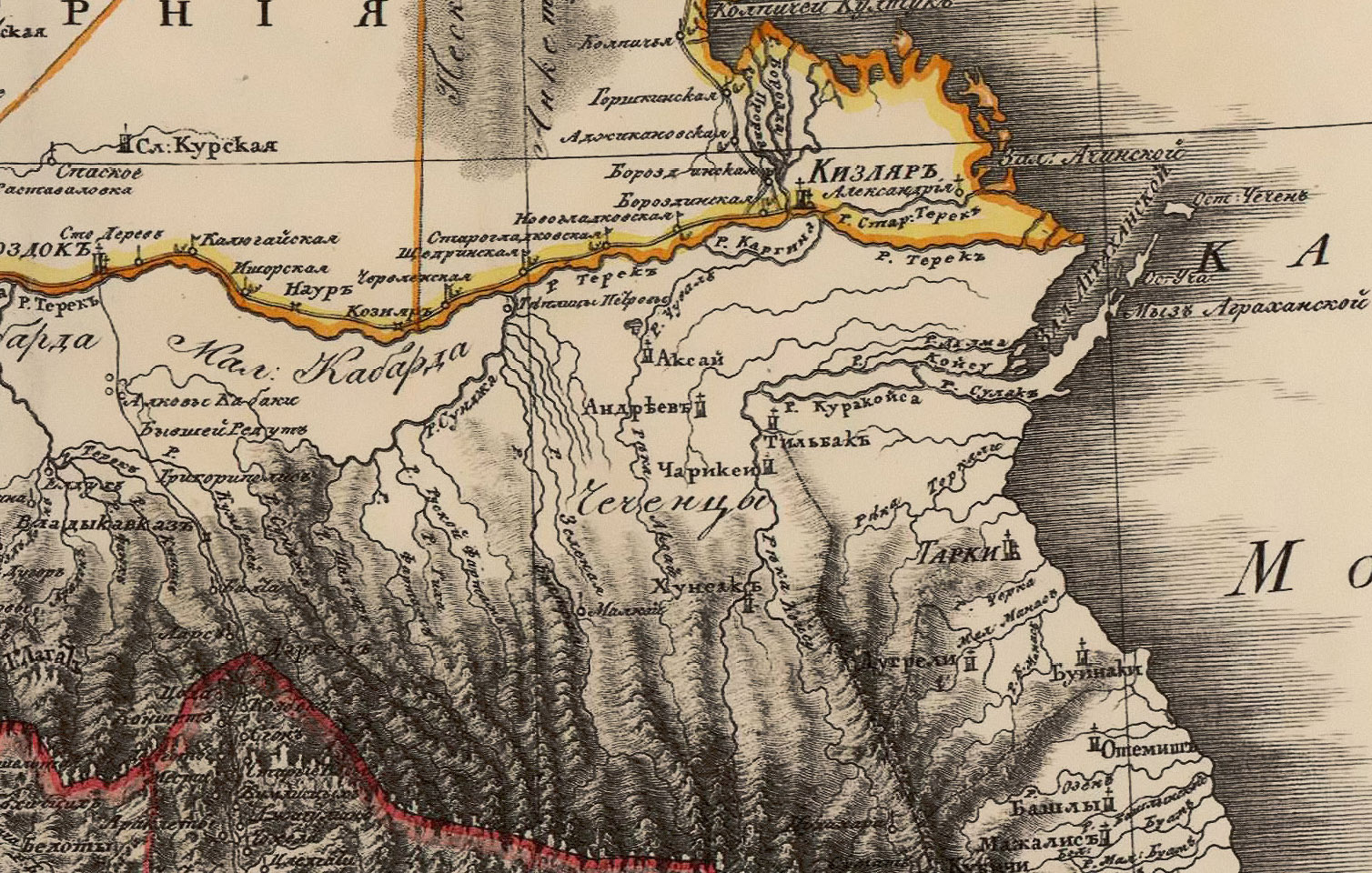
- Chechens on the map of 1807
Date	17 February 1807
Location	Khankala Gorge, Chechnya
Result	Russian victory

Belligerents
Russian Empire	Chechens

Commanders and leaders
S. A. Bulgakov; Peter Kaptzevich	Beibulat Taimi

Strength
8,000 men, 29 guns.	Unknown

Casualties and losses
1,000 killed and wounded	Unknown

The battle of Khankala happened on 17 February 1807. In this action, the Khankala fortification was taken by storm. Russian forces entered Chechnya from three directions under the command of General of Infantry S. A. Bulgakov. The purpose of the expedition was to establish control over the strategically important Khankala Gorge.

== Background ==
Not a single Russian expedition in the Caucasus in 1804—1806 was so numerous. At the beginning of 1807, the commander-in-chief of the troops in Georgia and Dagestan, Count Major General I.V. Gudovich, ordered the commander of the troops on the Caucasian Line, Infantry General S.A. Bulgakov to intimidate and punish the Chechens for their raids and robberies.

== Assault on the Khankala fortification ==
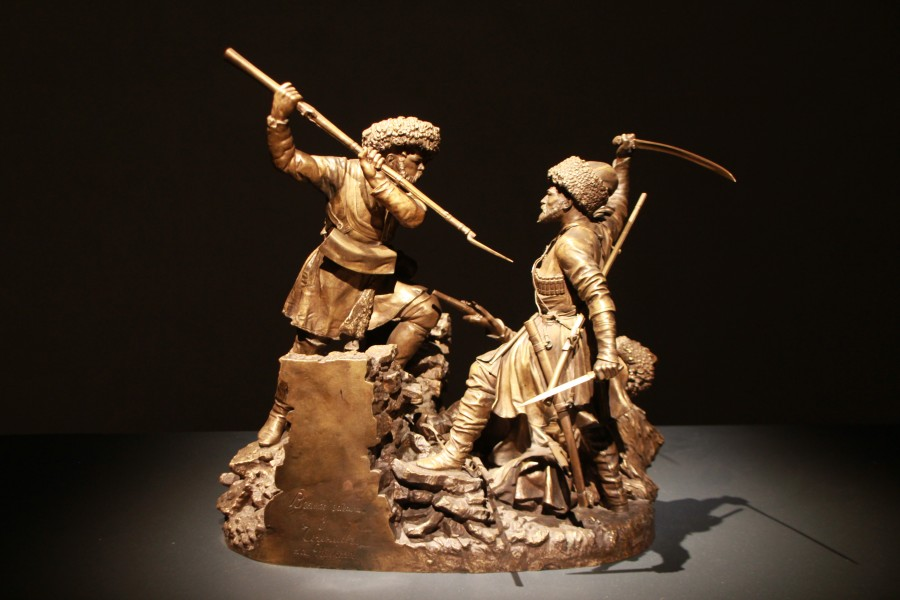
Taking fortifications from the Chechens in the Caucasus, by Ferdinand Kreitan (1850)

On 13 February 1807, troops invaded Chechnya. The detachment of General Bulgakov could only penetrate the territory of Greater Chechnya by passing the Khankala Gorge, known to the line Cossacks as the Iron Gates. At that time, about twenty Chechen farms and auls were located in the vicinity of the Khankala Gorge.

On the 15th, the troops moved forward, almost to the very edge of the Khankala forest and camped opposite the village of Yangi-Yurt. The Chechens were waiting for the approach of the Russians, and as soon as they appeared, frequent rifle shots rained down from the forest. The whole day there was a shootout, at dusk crowds of Chechens rushed into hand-to-hand combat, but the Nizhny Novgorod dragoons under the command of Colonel K. F. Stal successfully beat them off.

By the time the troops approached, the Chechens had heavily fortified the gorge, creating rows of blockages, ditches and fences. "In the middle of the dense forest of plane trees, in the depths of the gorge, the Chechens took a terrible, almost impregnable position. It was covered from the front by a whole series of blockages, surrounded by ditches and moats; even further went log cabins, dotted with loopholes.

On the morning of the 17th, troops entered the protected forest in three columns. Nizhny Novgorod, dismounted, who sent their horses to Wegenburg, were distributed among all three columns, but most of them were concentrated in the left column, commanded by K. F. Stal. The Chechens greeted the attackers with a wild cry, and the whole forest trembled from the mixed sounds of the fierce battle that immediately began. Shooting and fights, Bulgakov says in his report, made up a very striking picture for the eyes and ears and gave rise to extraordinary feelings. The attackers seemed to be in a fiery club. Slowly, step by step, the troops moved forward, showered with bullets from the front, turning their guns now to the right, then to the left to repel the Chechens, who attacked them furiously from the flanks. But following this path, the soldiers took notch after notch, blockage after blockage, blockhouse after blockhouse. Stal’s left column found the obstacles almost insurmountable. Knocked out of some trenches and spotted, the enemy took cover behind the stone bends of the gorge, fortified again, and again struck the attackers. The Chechens defended themselves desperately, giving, as Bulgakov put it, a pretext for the attackers to declare countless feats.

Military historian P. M. Sakhno-Ustimovich wrote:

In order to force them out of this ambush, Bulgakov, hastening some of the dragoons and Cossacks of the line that he had, sent them to the arrows, and left the horses, with a little cover, at the entrance to Khankala. But when our troops, fighting incessantly, deepened into the forest gorge, the Chechens, making their way back along the side paths, suddenly attacked the rear guard, repulsed the horses left there and drove them into the forest before they managed to give help to the weak cover, which suffered a significant loss. Thus, at the very beginning of the campaign, we lost up to 500 horses, and the same number of dragoons and Cossacks had to remain on foot during the entire time of the detachment's actions in Chechnya.

The battle went on for seven hours. Finally, the detachment made its way through the forest and went to the other side of the gorge. But three more hours of heroic efforts were needed from the army for the final defeat of the enemy. Highlanders overturned at all points, retreated.

== Losses ==
As a result of a bloody battle, the Russians managed to break through the gorge. In various reports of I.V. Gudovich, Russian losses are called in the amount of 51 to 63 killed with 111 wounded, however, artillery officer Brimmer estimated Russian losses at about a thousand people.

== Effects ==
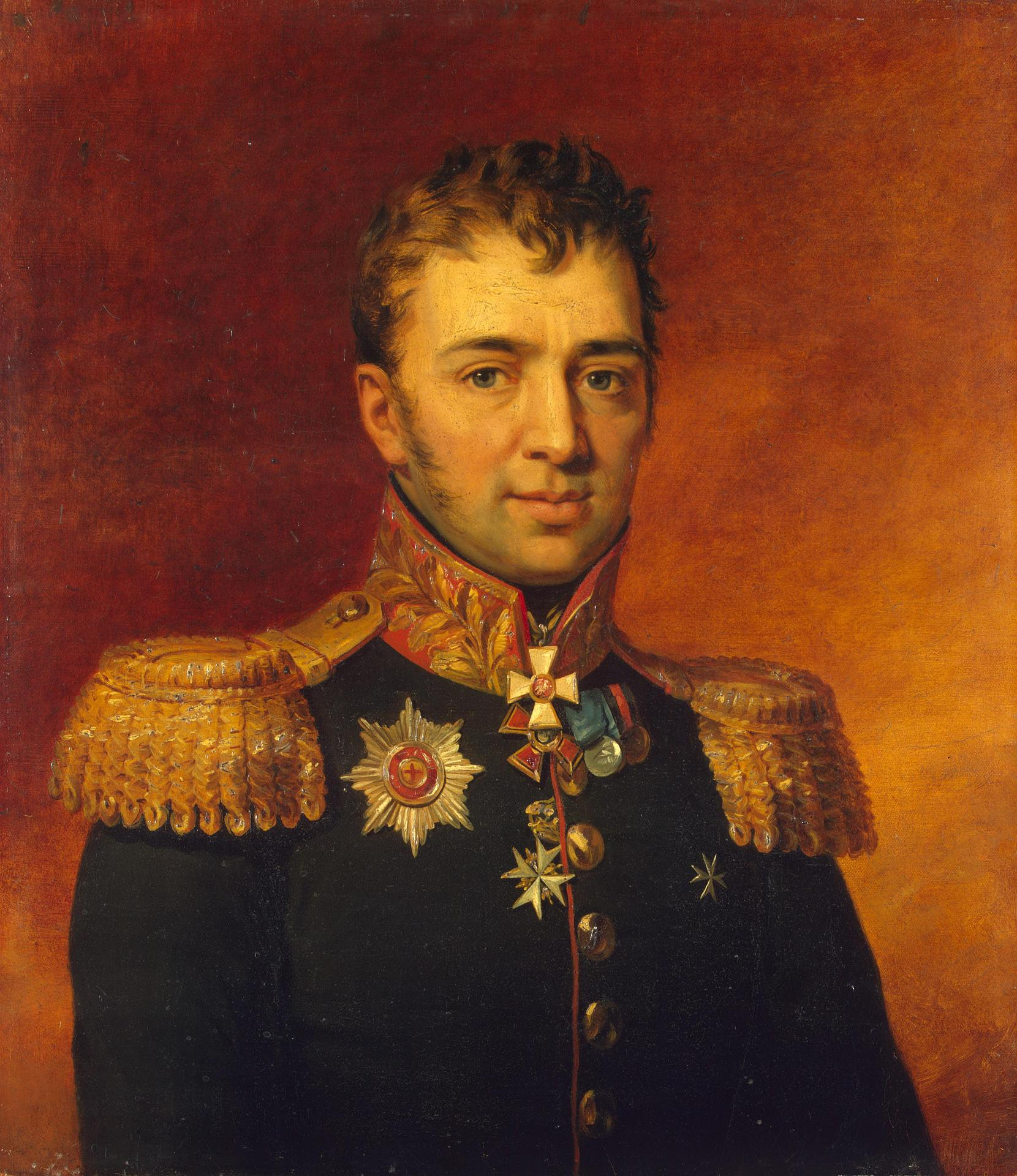
Pyotr Likhachev hero of the Napoleonic Wars, by George Dawe 1820—1825

As a result of a stubborn 10-hour assault, accompanied by heavy losses on the part of the Russian army, the Khankala fortification was occupied by the 16th Jaeger Regiment, commanded by General P. G. Likhachev, later the hero of the Battle of Borodino. The commander of the Nizhny Novgorod Dragoon Regiment K. F. Stal was promoted to major general, subsequently appointed commander of the troops of the Caucasian cordon line, governor of the Caucasus region.

== See also ==
- Battle of Aldy
