= Ourcq =

River in northeastern France

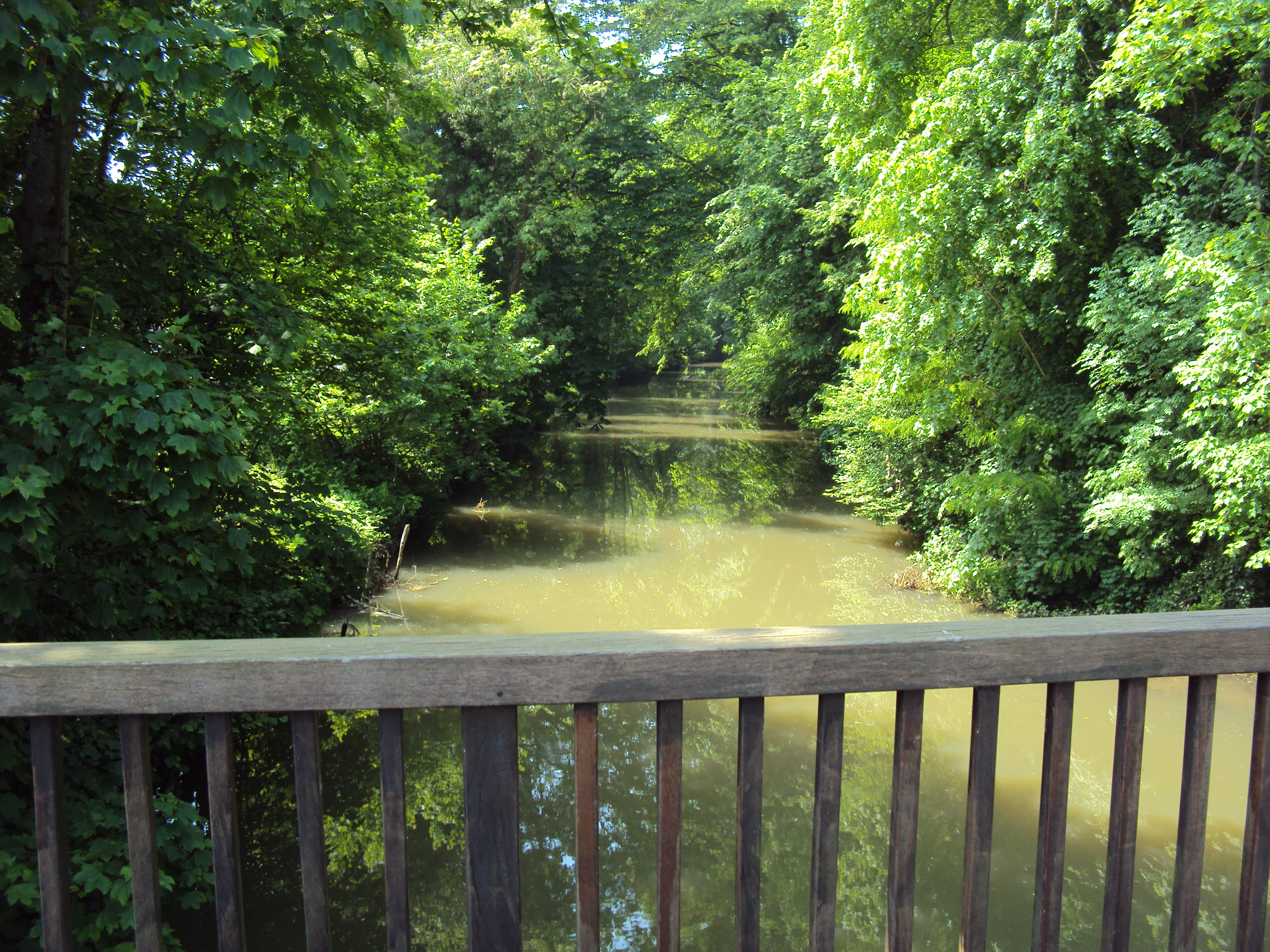
- Ourcq river in Lizy-sur-Ourcq

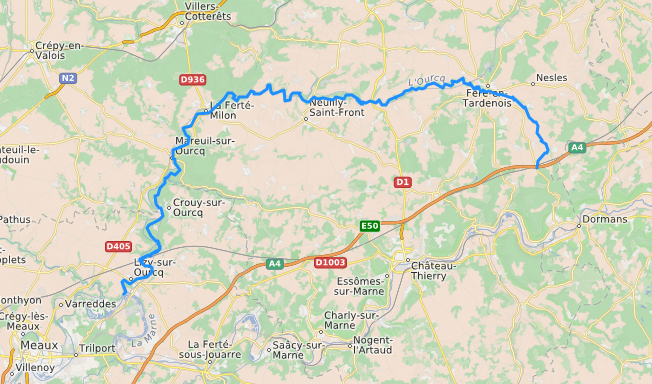

Location
- Country: France

Physical characteristics
- Source
  - location: Hauts-de-France
- Mouth
  - location: Marne
  - coordinates: 49°0′49″N 3°0′49″E
- Length: 86.5 km (53.7 mi)

Basin features
- Progression: Marne→ Seine→ English Channel

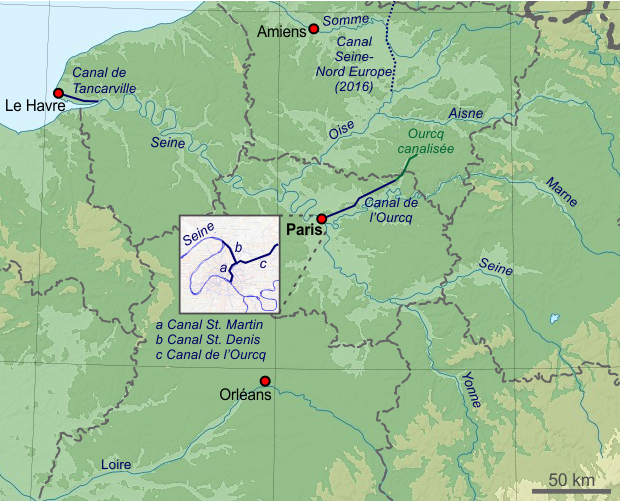
A map of rivers and canals in and around Paris.

The Ourcq (French: [uʁk], Urc in 855) is an 86.5-kilometre-long (53.7 mi) river in France, a right tributary of the Marne. Its source is near the village Ronchères, and its course crosses the departments of Aisne, Oise, and Seine-et-Marne. It flows southwest through the towns of Fère-en-Tardenois, La Ferté-Milon, Mareuil-sur-Ourcq, and Crouy-sur-Ourcq, finally flowing into the Marne near Lizy-sur-Ourcq. Napoleon I made use of the river as a water source, and it supplied the city of Paris until Baron Haussmann's rebuilding of Paris.
