= Mareuil-sur-Ourcq =

- Commune
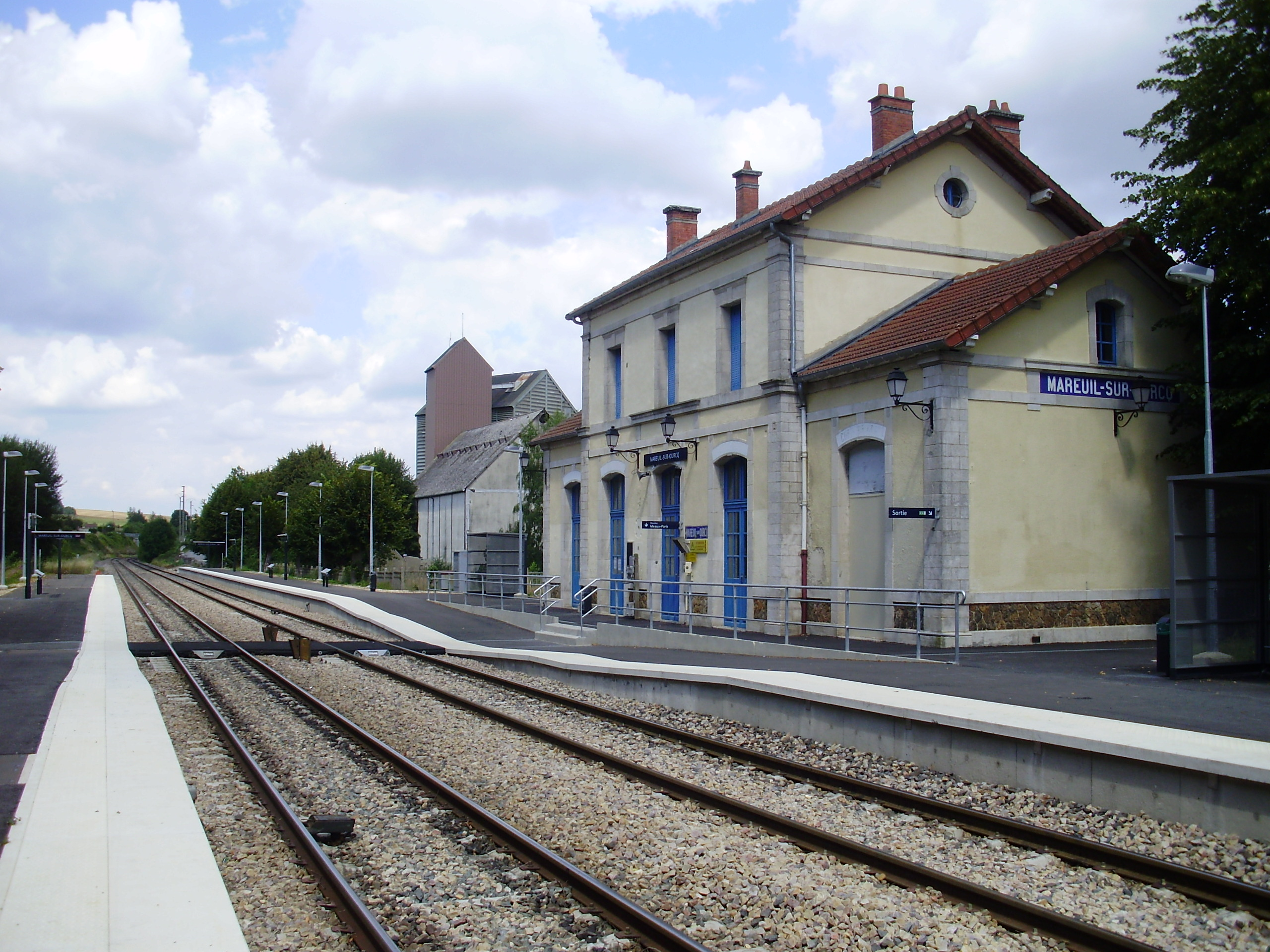
- Railway station
- Location of Mareuil-sur-Ourcq
- Location within France Location within Hauts-de-France
- Coordinates: 49°08′14″N 3°04′40″E
- Country: France
- Region: Hauts-de-France
- Department: Oise
- Arrondissement: Senlis
- Canton: Nanteuil-le-Haudouin
- Intercommunality: Pays de Valois

Government
  - Mayor (2020–2026): Benoît Proffit
- Area^{1}: 10.14 km^{2} (3.92 sq mi)
- Elevation: 70 m (230 ft)
- Highest elevation: 138 m (453 ft)
- Lowest elevation: 56 m (184 ft)
- Population (2023): 1,581
  - Density: 155.9/km^{2} (403.8/sq mi)
- Time zone: UTC+01:00 (CET)
  - Summer (DST): UTC+02:00 (CEST)
- INSEE/Postal code: 60380 /60890
- ^{1} French Land Register data, which excludes lakes, ponds, glaciers > 1 km^{2} (0.386 sq mi or 247 acres) and river estuaries.

Mareuil-sur-Ourcq (French pronunciation: [maʁœj syʁ uʁk], literally Mareuil on Ourcq) is a commune in the Oise department in northern France.

== See also ==
- Communes of the Oise department
