= Hoche station =

Metro station in Paris, France

Hoche
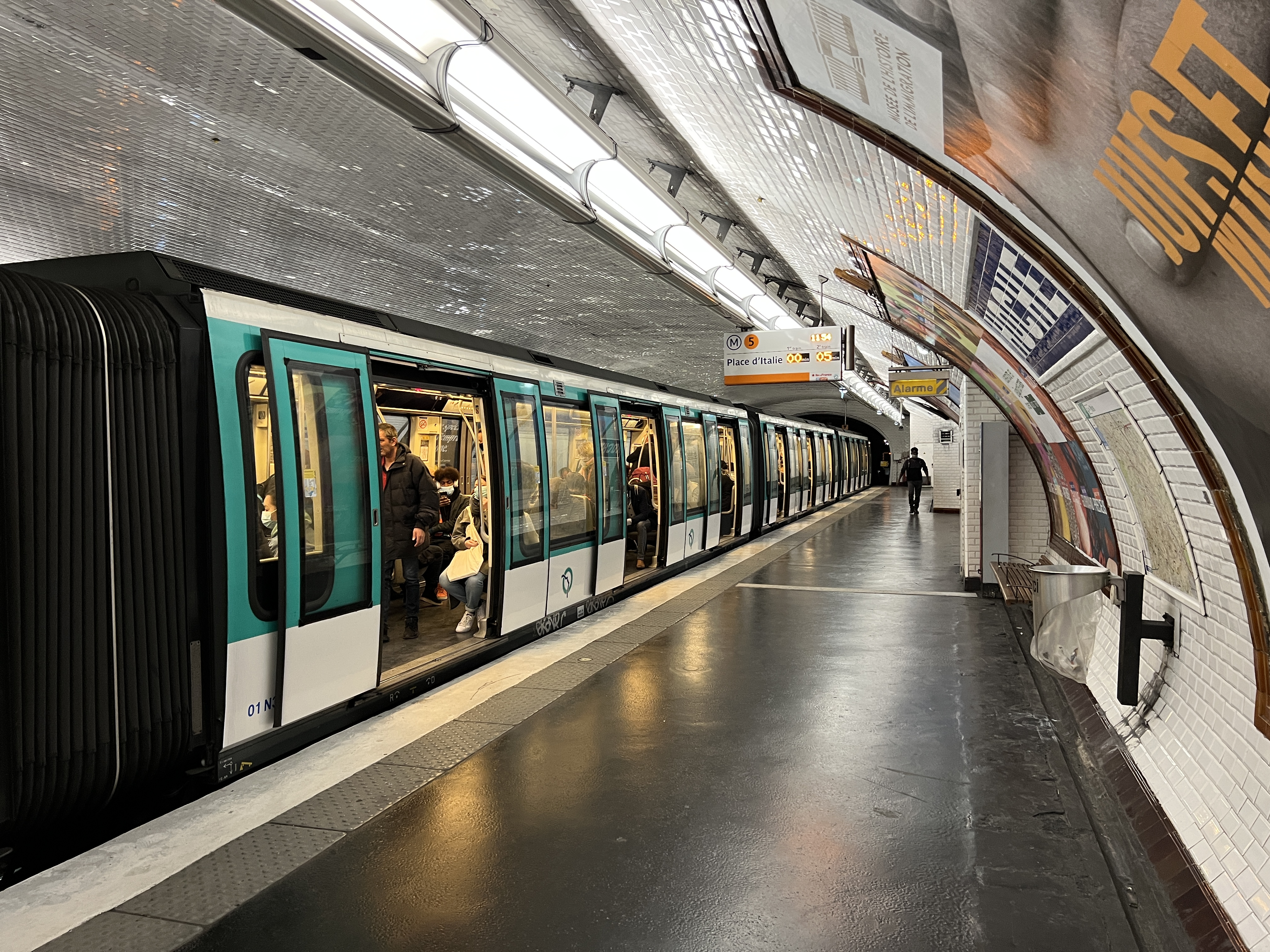
- MF 01 at Hoche

General information
- Location: 3, rue Hoche; 50, av. Jean Lolive; 60, av. Jean Lolive; Pantin; Île-de-France; France
- Coordinates: 48°53′28″N 2°24′11″E
- Owner: RATP
- Operator: RATP
- Line: Paris Metro Paris Metro Line 5
- Platforms: 2 (2 side platforms)
- Tracks: 2

Construction
- Accessible: No

Other information
- Station code: 0309
- Fare zone: 2

History
- Opened: 12 October 1942

Passengers
- 3,928,404 (2021)

Services
Preceding station	Paris Metro	Following station
Porte de Pantin towards Place d'Italie	Line 5	Église de Pantin towards Bobigny–Pablo Picasso
Location
- Location within Paris

Hoche (French: [ɔʃ]) is a station of the Paris Métro, serving line 5. It is named after the nearby rue Hoche, which in turn was named after Lazare Hoche (1768-1797), a general during the French Revolution who at the age of 25, commanded the Army of the Moselle in which he drove the Austrians back to Wœrth, cleared Landau and Alsace. The platform in the direction of Bobigny contains in a display case where a bust of Lazare Hoche as well as several images evoking his life as a general were installed.

== History ==
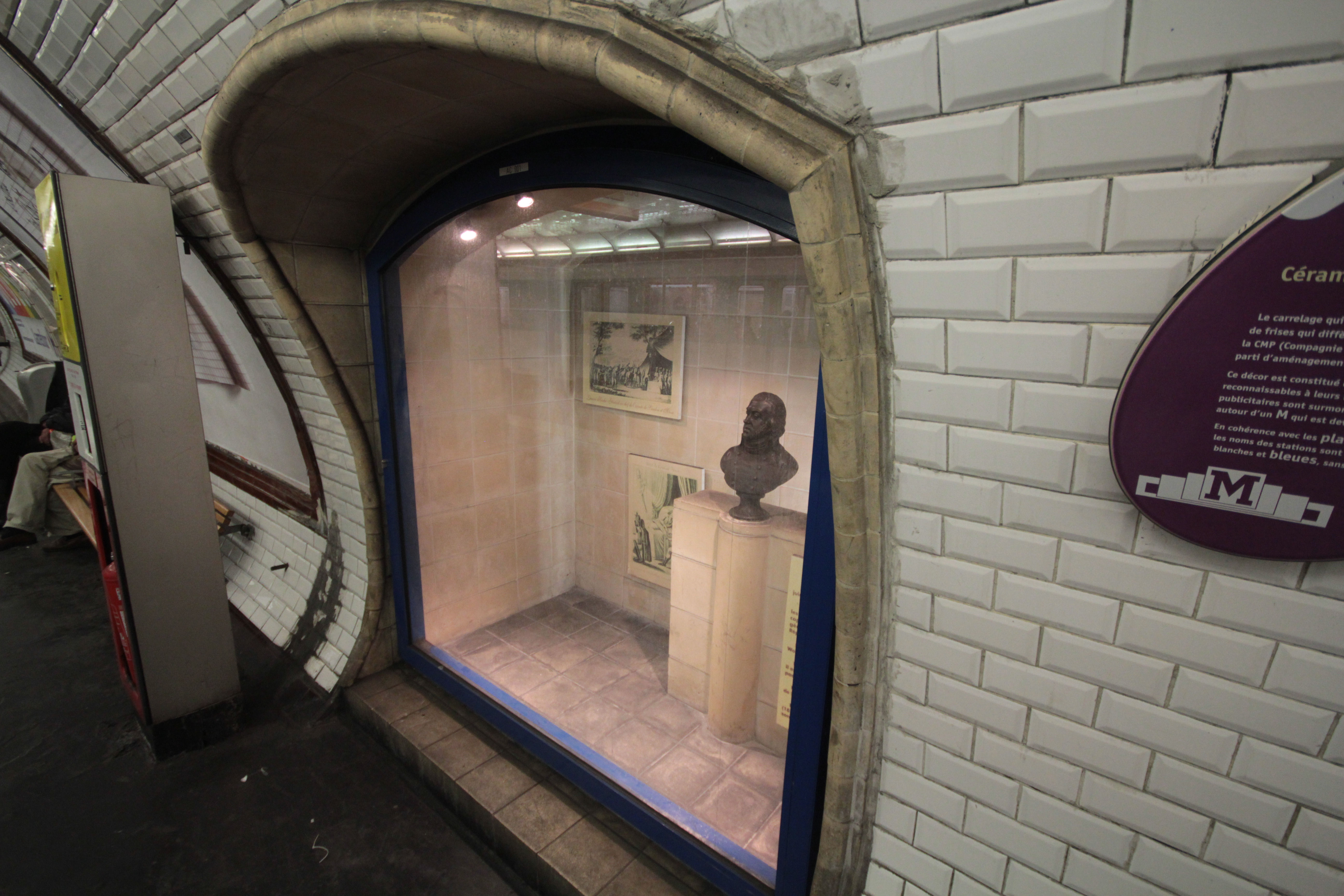
Display case on the platform in the direction of Bobigny

The station opened on 12 October 1942 when the line was extended from Gare du Nord to Église de Pantin.

As part of the "Renouveau du métro" programme by the RATP, the station was renovated and modernised on 30 August 2002.

In 2024, it will be served by line 3 of the T Zen network, a bus rapid transit system. It was originally slated to open in 2018, then postponed to the end of 2022, then again to 2024.

In 2019, the station was used by 4,995,902 passengers, making it the 83rd busiest of the Métro network out of 302 stations.

In 2020, the station was used by 2,616,315 passengers amidst the COVID-19 pandemic, making it the 77th busiest of the Métro network out of 305 stations.

In 2021, the station was used by 3,928,404 passengers, making it the 59th busiest of the Métro network out of 305 stations.

== Passenger services ==
=== Access ===
The station has three accesses:

- Access 1: rue Hoche
- Access 2: rue du Pré-Saint-Gervais Centre Commercial
- Access 3: rue Charles Nodier (with an ascending escalator)

=== Station layout ===
Street level
B1	Mezzanine
Platform level	Side platform, doors will open on the right
Platform level	Southbound	← toward Place d'Italie (Porte de Pantin)
Platform level	Northbound	toward Bobigny – Pablo Picasso (Église de Pantin) →
Platform level	Side platform, doors will open on the right

=== Platforms ===
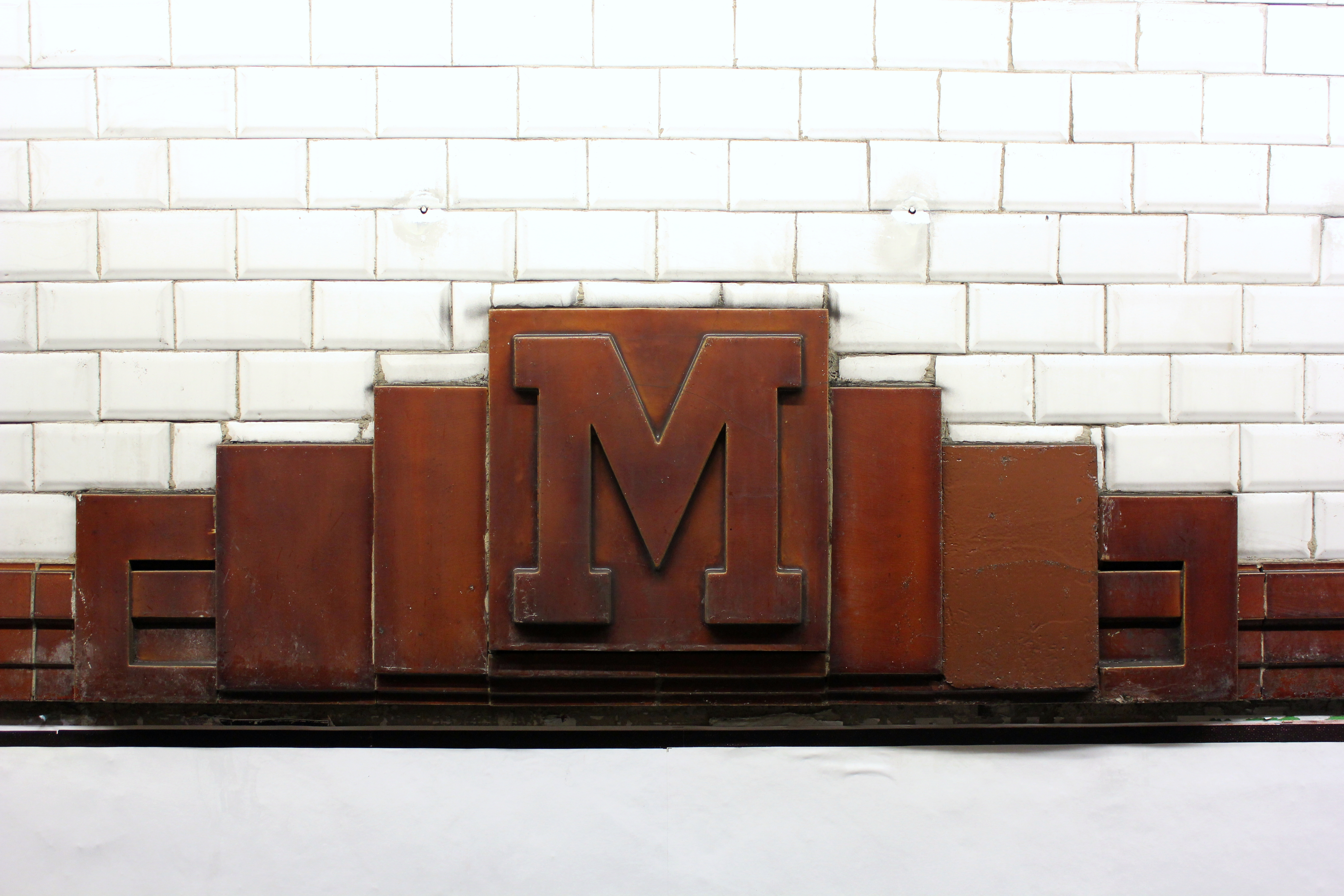
Detailing of the advertising frames

Hoche has a standard platform configuration: it has two side platforms separated by the two tracks under an elliptical vault. It has white and rounded lighting bands in the Gaudin style of the metro revival of the 2000s and white bevelled ceramic tiles cover the walls, vault, tunnel exits and outlets of the corridors. The platforms are equipped with benches made of slats. Its advertising frame is made up of brown faience in a simple geometric pattern and the letter M surmounted on it, a feature only found in seven other stations on the network.

For more than ten years until 2018, the name of the station on the walls of the platforms were written in Parisine font on thin plates, covering the original names that were made of faience. As with Filles du Calvaire on line 8 and Porte des Lilas on line 11, they were removed and the faience signs were restored.

=== Other connections ===
The station is also served by lines 151, 170, 330, and the P'tit Bus of the RATP Bus Network, and at night, by lines N13, N41, and N45 of the Noctilien network.

== Nearby ==
- Centre National de la Danse

== Gallery ==
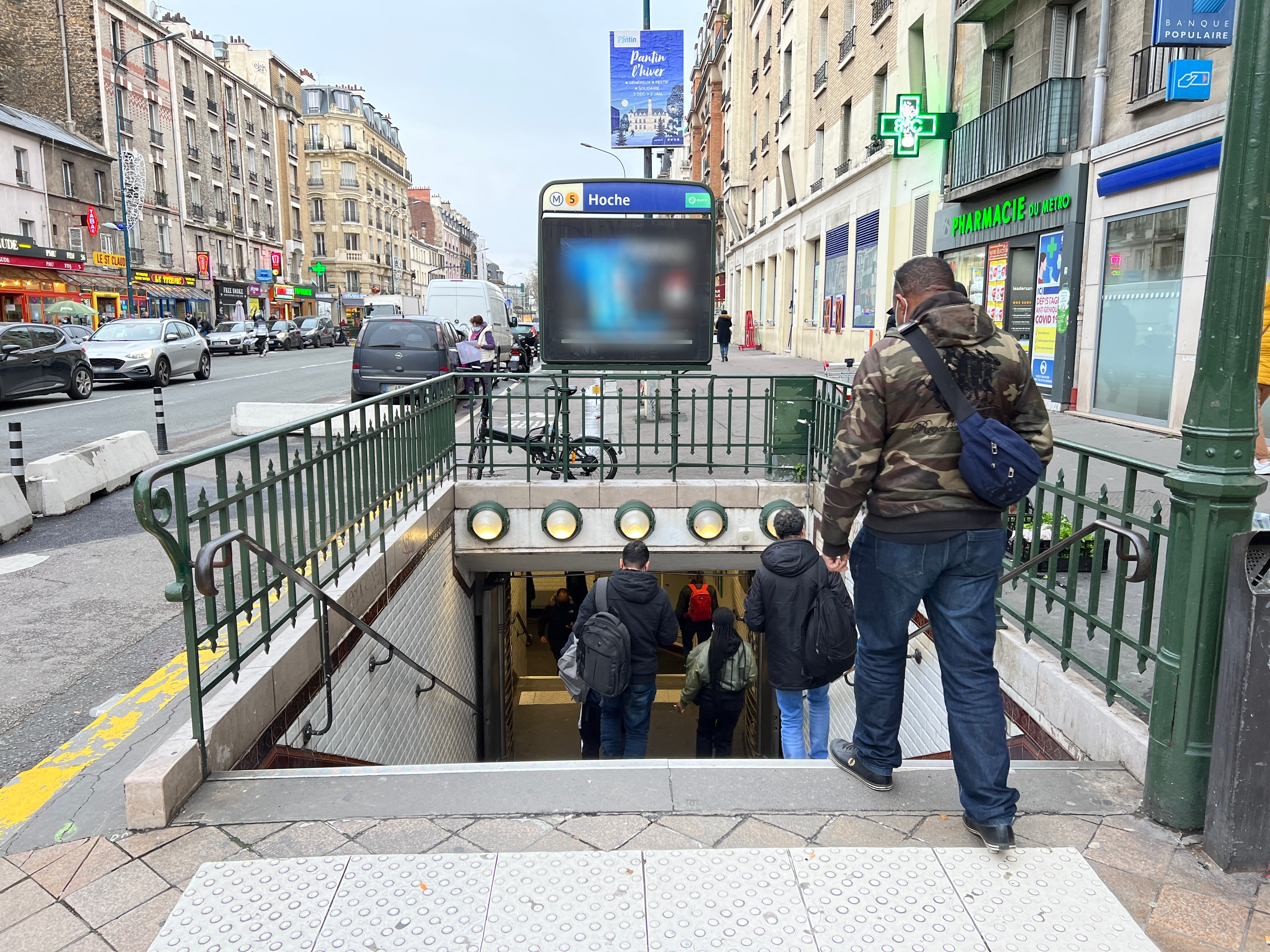
Access 1

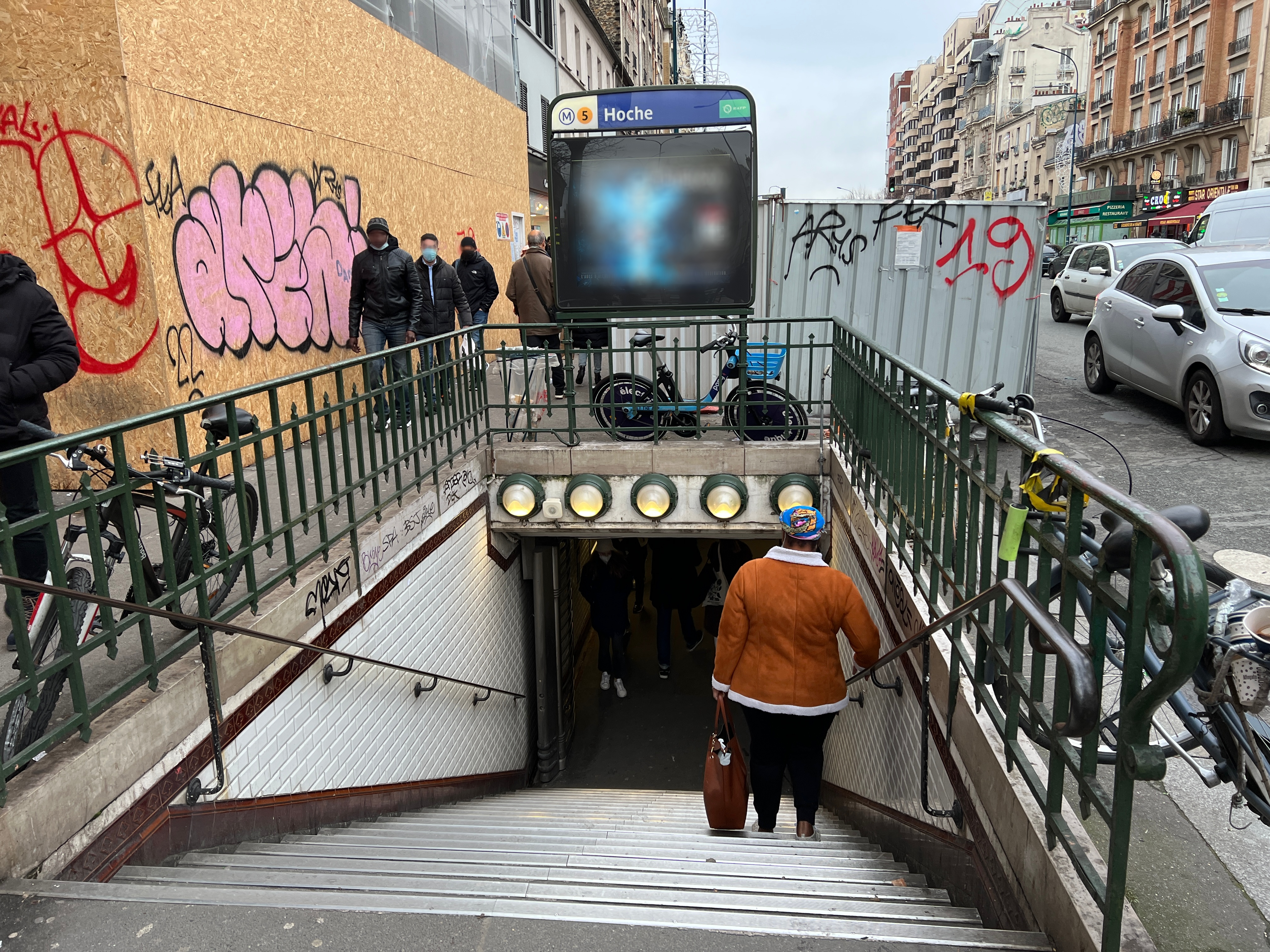
Access 2

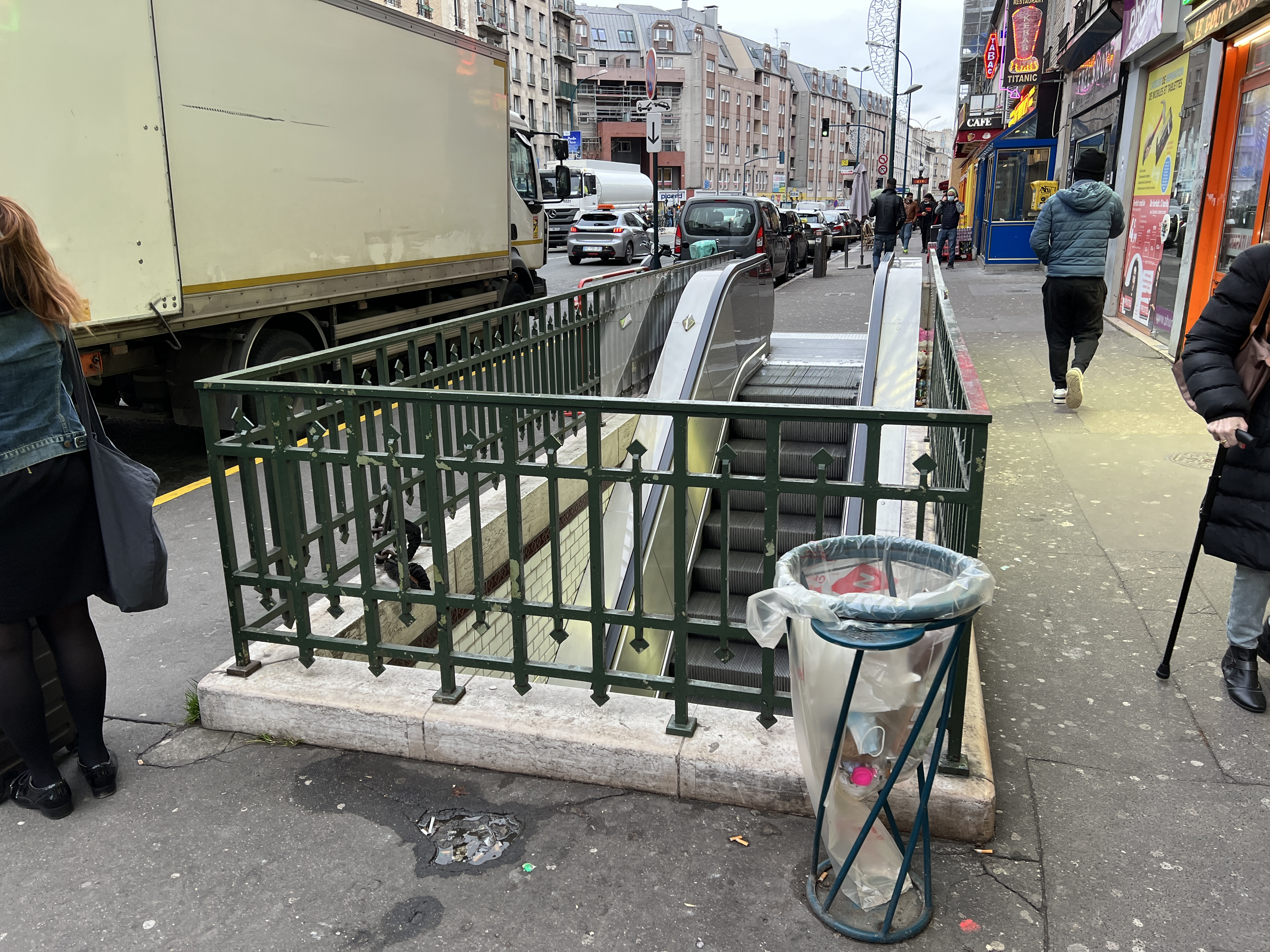
Access 3

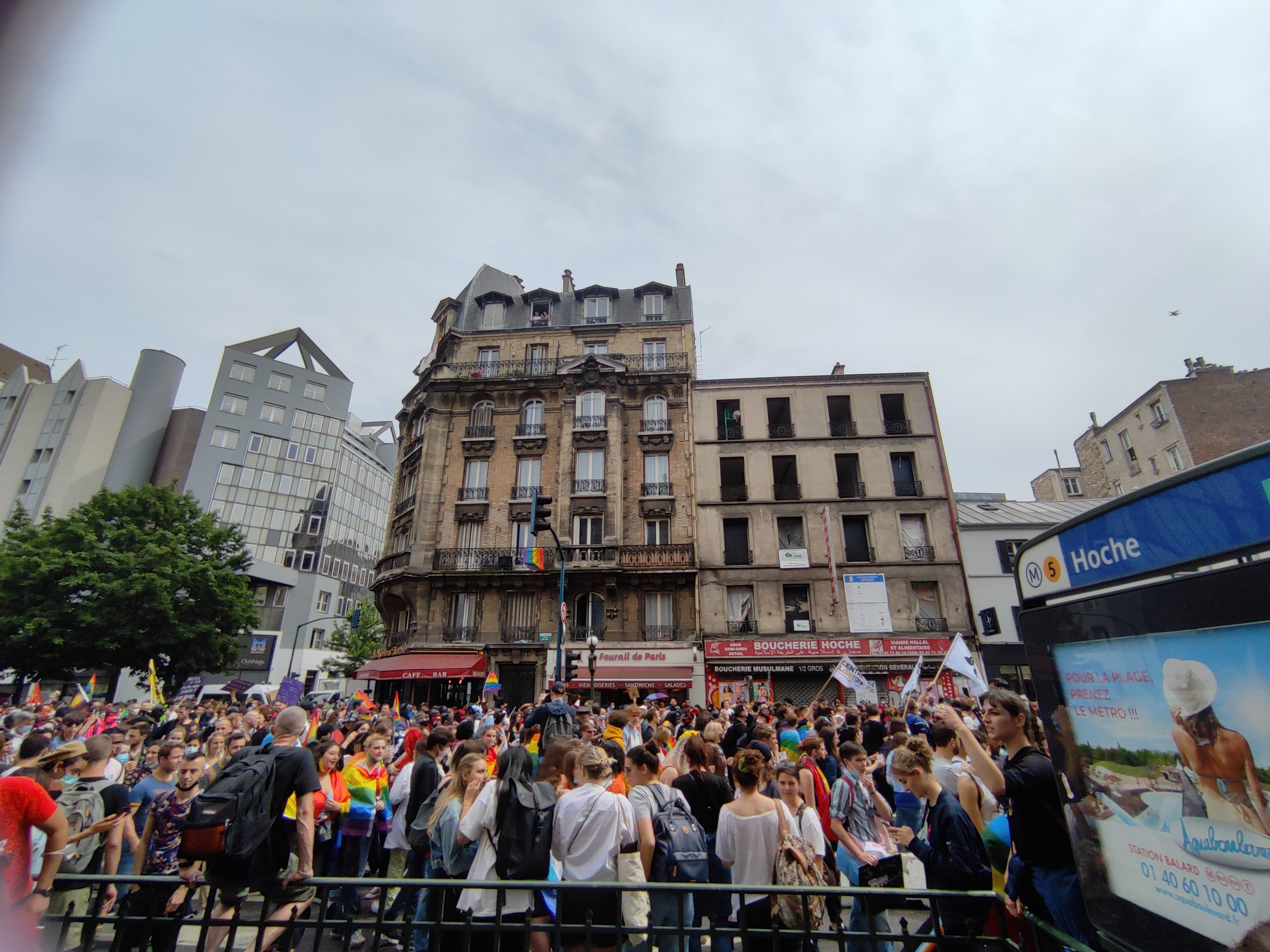
Paris Pride at Hoche in 2021
