= Église de Pantin station =

Metro station in Paris, France

Église de Pantin
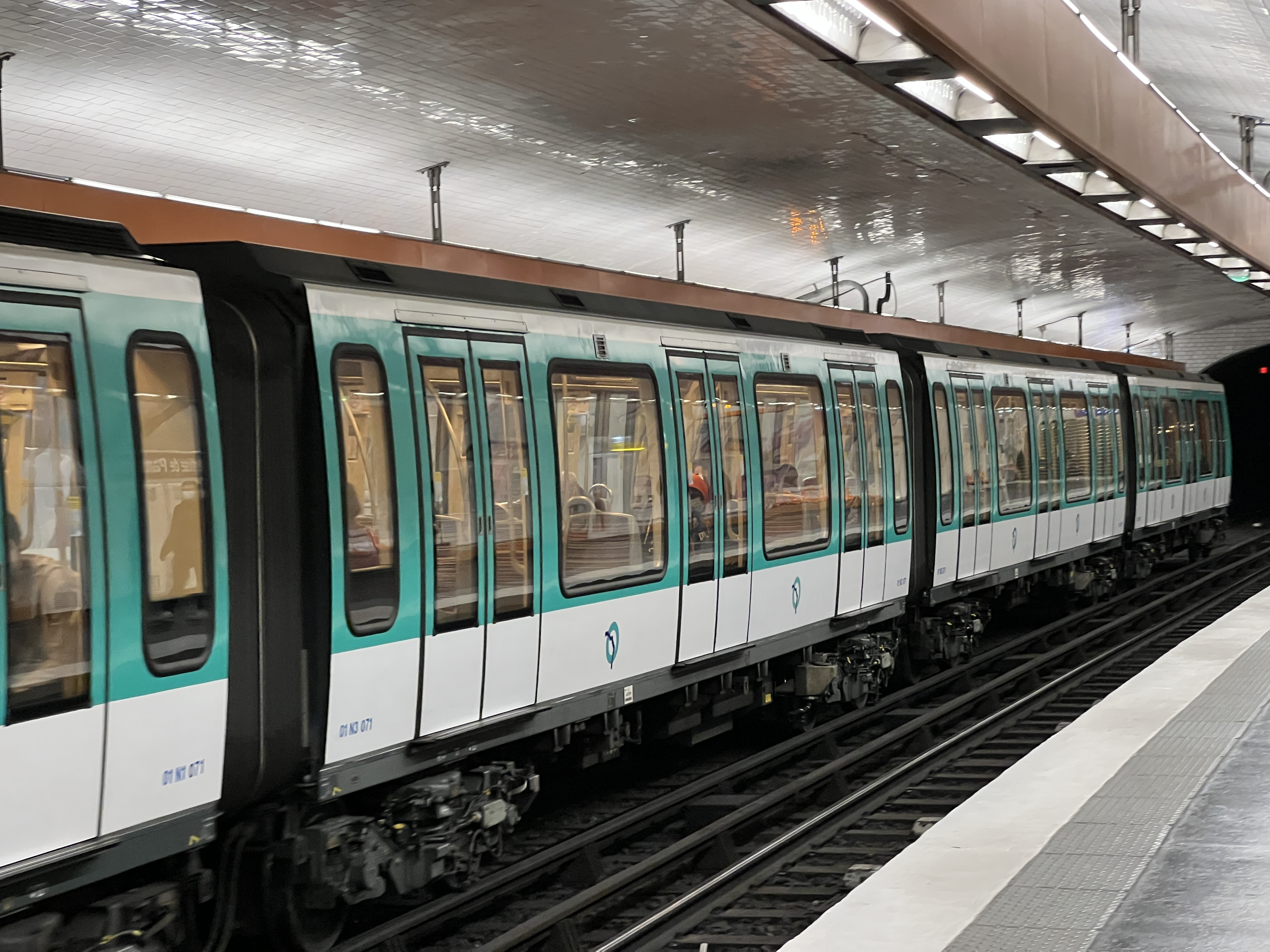
- MF 01 at Église de Pantin

General information
- Location: 121, rue Jean Lolive; Rue Jean Lolive × Rue Victor Hugo (two); Pantin; Île-de-France; France
- Coordinates: 48°53′38″N 2°24′47″E
- Owner: RATP
- Operator: RATP
- Platforms: 2 (2 side platforms)
- Tracks: 2

Construction
- Accessible: no

Other information
- Station code: 03-10
- Fare zone: 2

History
- Opened: 12 October 1942

Passengers
- 2,832,467 (2021)

Services
Preceding station	Paris Metro	Following station
Hoche towards Place d'Italie	Line 5	Bobigny–Pantin–Raymond Queneau towards Bobigny–Pablo Picasso
Location
- Location within Paris

Église de Pantin (French pronunciation: [eɡliz də pɑ̃tɛ̃]) is a station of the Paris Métro, serving line 5. It is named after the nearby Église Saint-Germain de Pantin, a local church.

== History ==
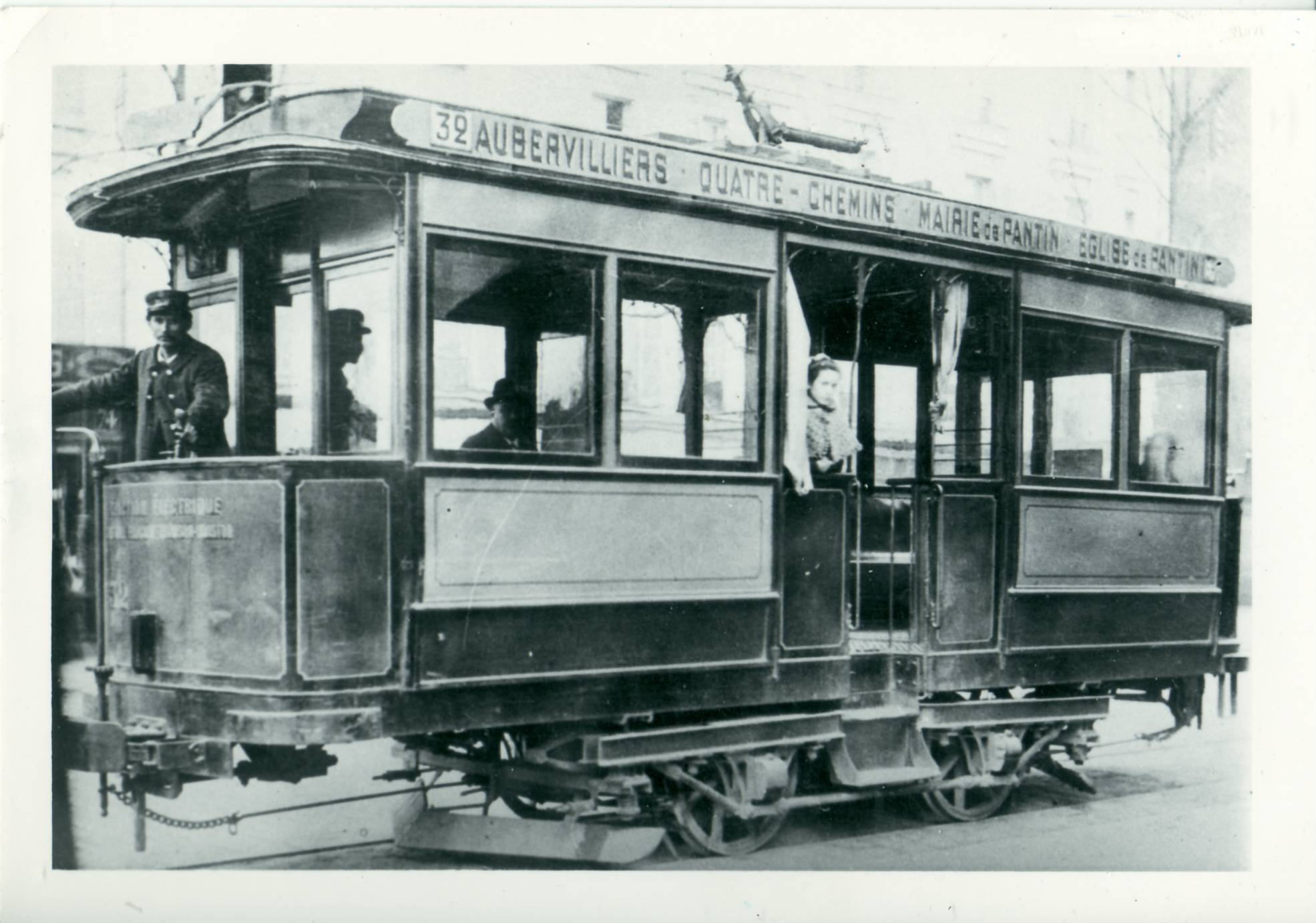
Église de Pantin was the terminus of tram lines, such as this one for the Mairie d'Aubervilliers.

The station opened on 12 October 1942 with the commissioning of the extension of line 5 from Gare du Nord to Eglise de Pantin, servings as its terminus until 25 April 1985 when it was extended to Bobigny–Pablo Picasso. As a result, there are four tracks and a scissors crossover just east of the station; two of which are used to reverse the direction of trains.

The station was an important connecting point with the bus lines running on the Route nationale 3 towards the eastern suburbs. A role whose importance declined with the extension of the line towards Bobigny.

On the morning of 7 June 1982, after a violent storm the day before, rainwater rushed through the construction site of the extension towards Bobigny, flooding the station. Eighteen trains were rendered unusable, affecting the operation of the line. Emergency equipment had to be transferred from the other lines including Sprague-Thomson trains from line 9 were used to mitigate the consequences of the accident.

As part of the "Renouveau du métro" programme by the RATP, the station was renovated and modernised on 23 June 2006.

In 2024, it will be served by line 3 of the T Zen network, a bus rapid transit system. It was originally slated to open 2018, then postponed to the end of 2022, then again to 2024.

In 2019, the station was used by 3,843,796 passengers, making it the 127th busiest of the Métro network out of 302 stations.

In 2020, the station was used by 2,139,986 passengers amidst the COVID-19 pandemic, making it the 112th busiest of the Métro network out of 305 stations.

In 2021, the station was used by 2,832,467 passengers, making it the 119th busiest of the Métro network out of 305 stations.

== Passenger services ==
=== Access ===
The station has five accesses:

- Access 1: avenue Jean Lolive
- Access 2: Gare routière (bus station) (with an ascending escalator)
- Access 3: rue Charles Auray
- Access 4: rue Jules Auffret
- Access 5: rue Delizy

=== Station layout ===
Street level
B1	Mezzanine
Platform level	Side platform, doors will open on the right
Platform level	Southbound	← toward Place d'Italie (Hoche)
Platform level	Northbound	toward Bobigny–Pablo Picasso (Bobigny–Pantin–Raymond Queneau) →
Platform level	Side platform, doors will open on the right

=== Platforms ===
The station has a standard configuration with 2 tracks surrounded by 2 side platforms in an elliptical vault. It is decorated in the Andreu-Motte style, with orange Motte seats as well as flat tiled benches.

=== Other connections ===
The station is also served by lines 61, 145, 147, and 249 of the RATP Bus Network, and at night, by the line N45 of the Noctilien network.

== Gallery ==
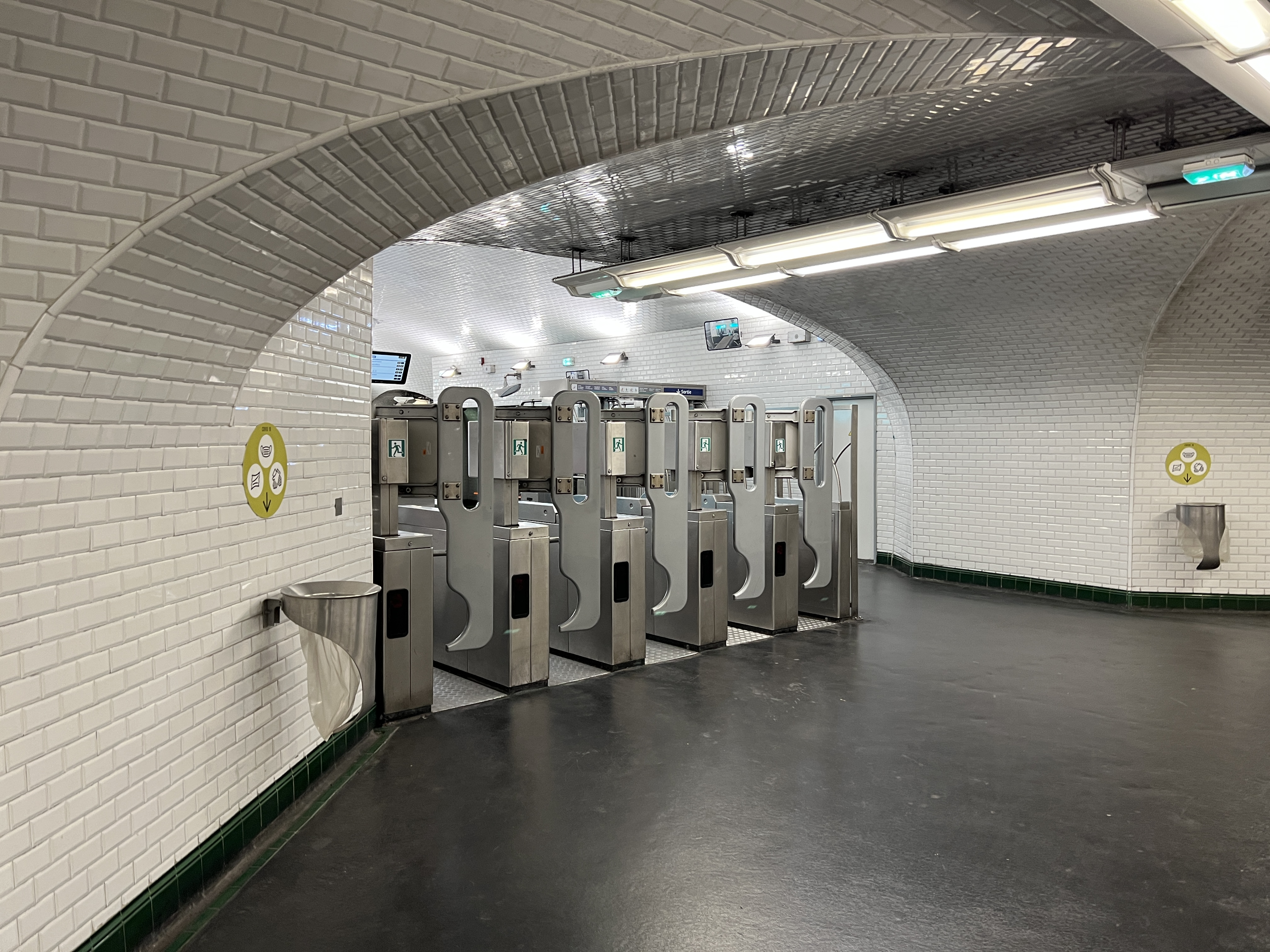
Mezzanine

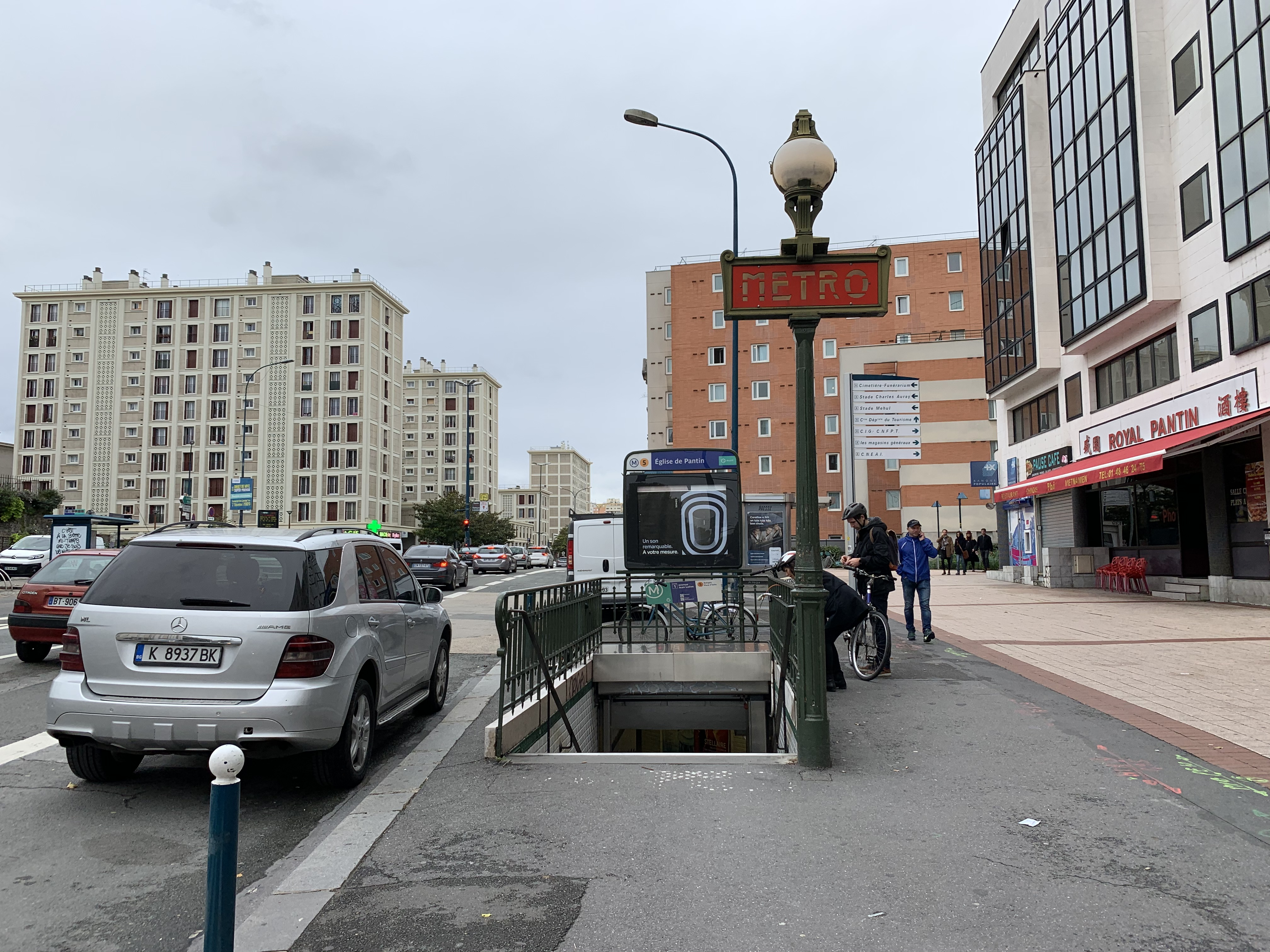
Access 1

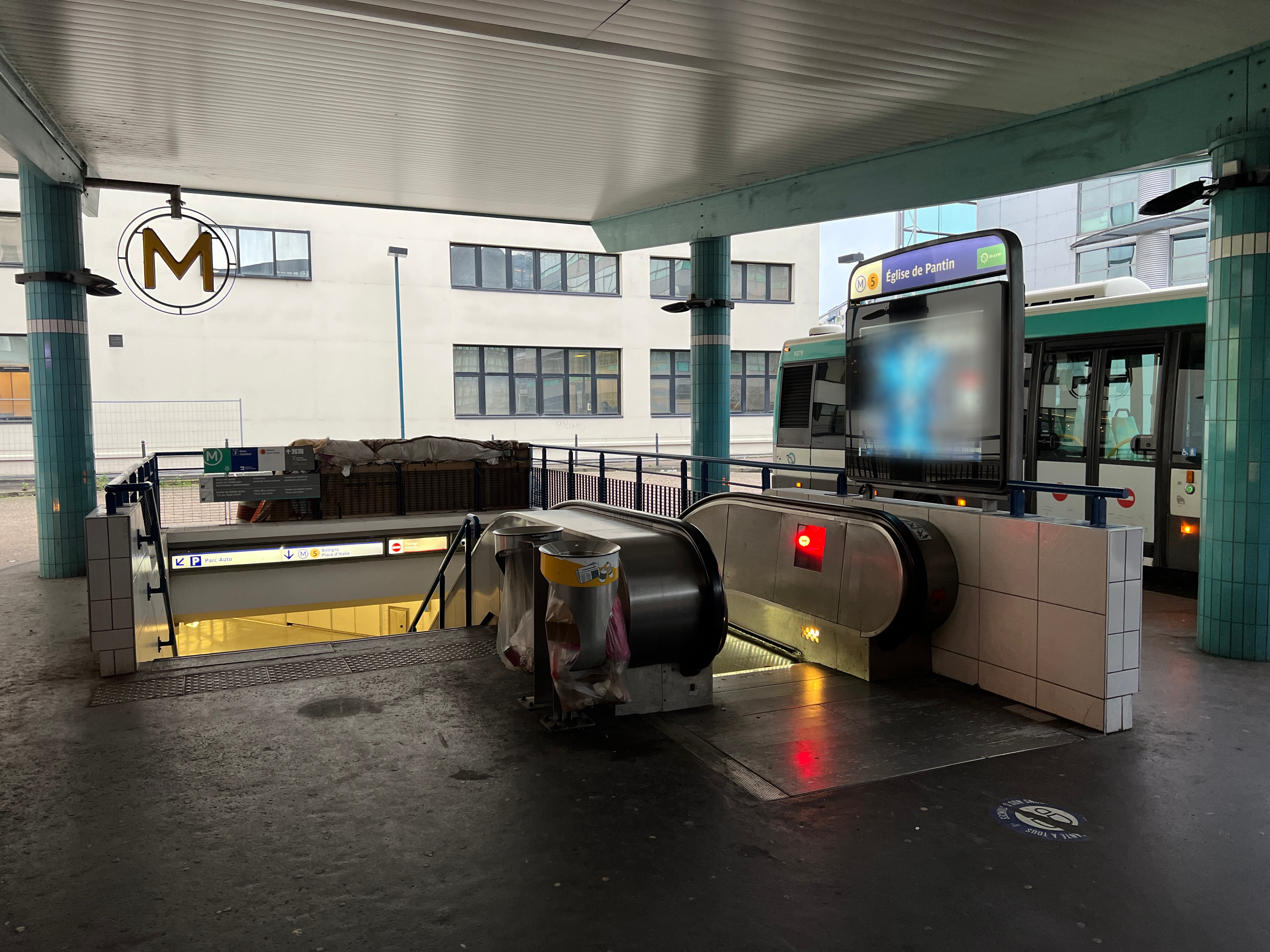
Access 2

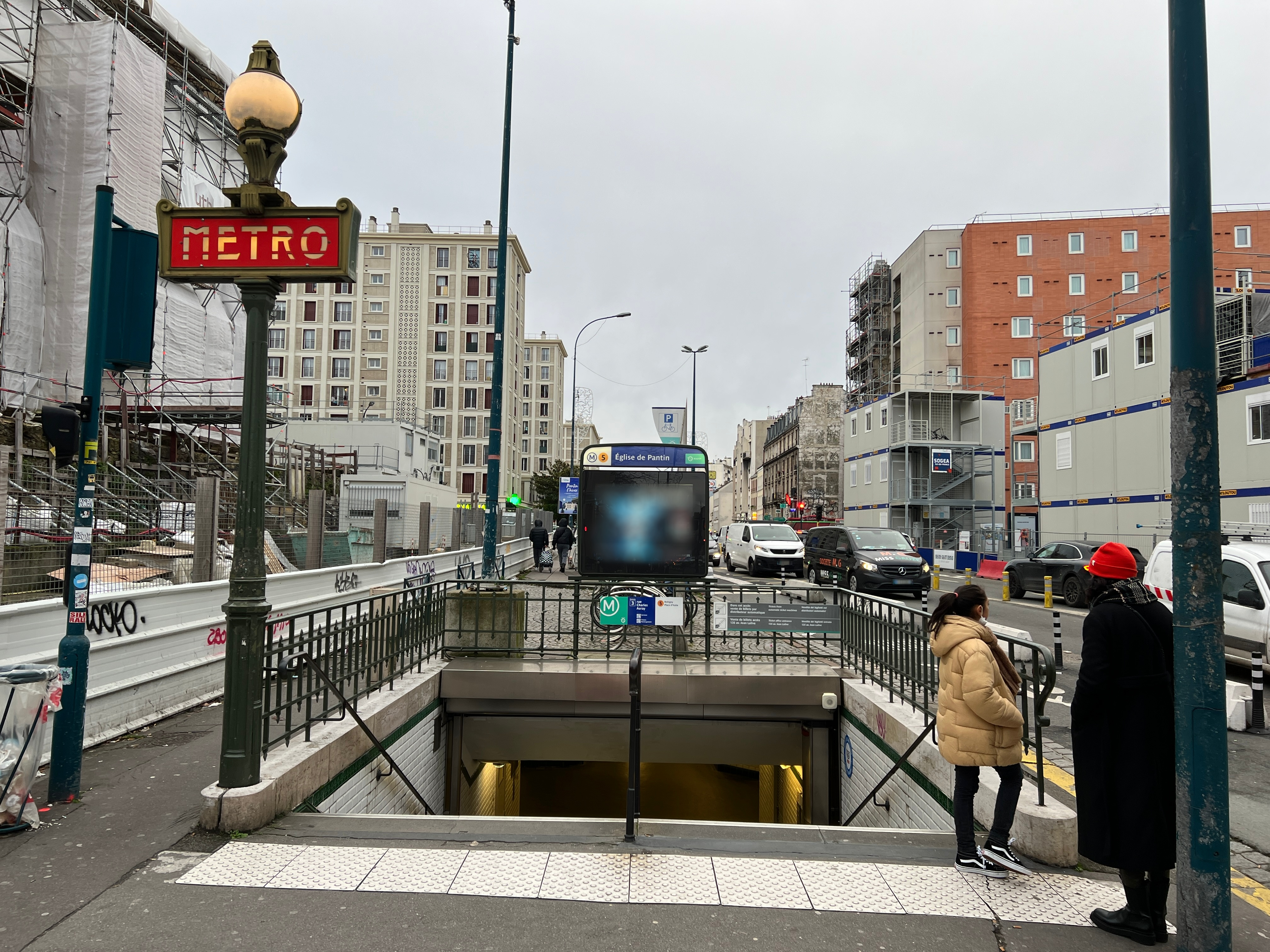
Access 3

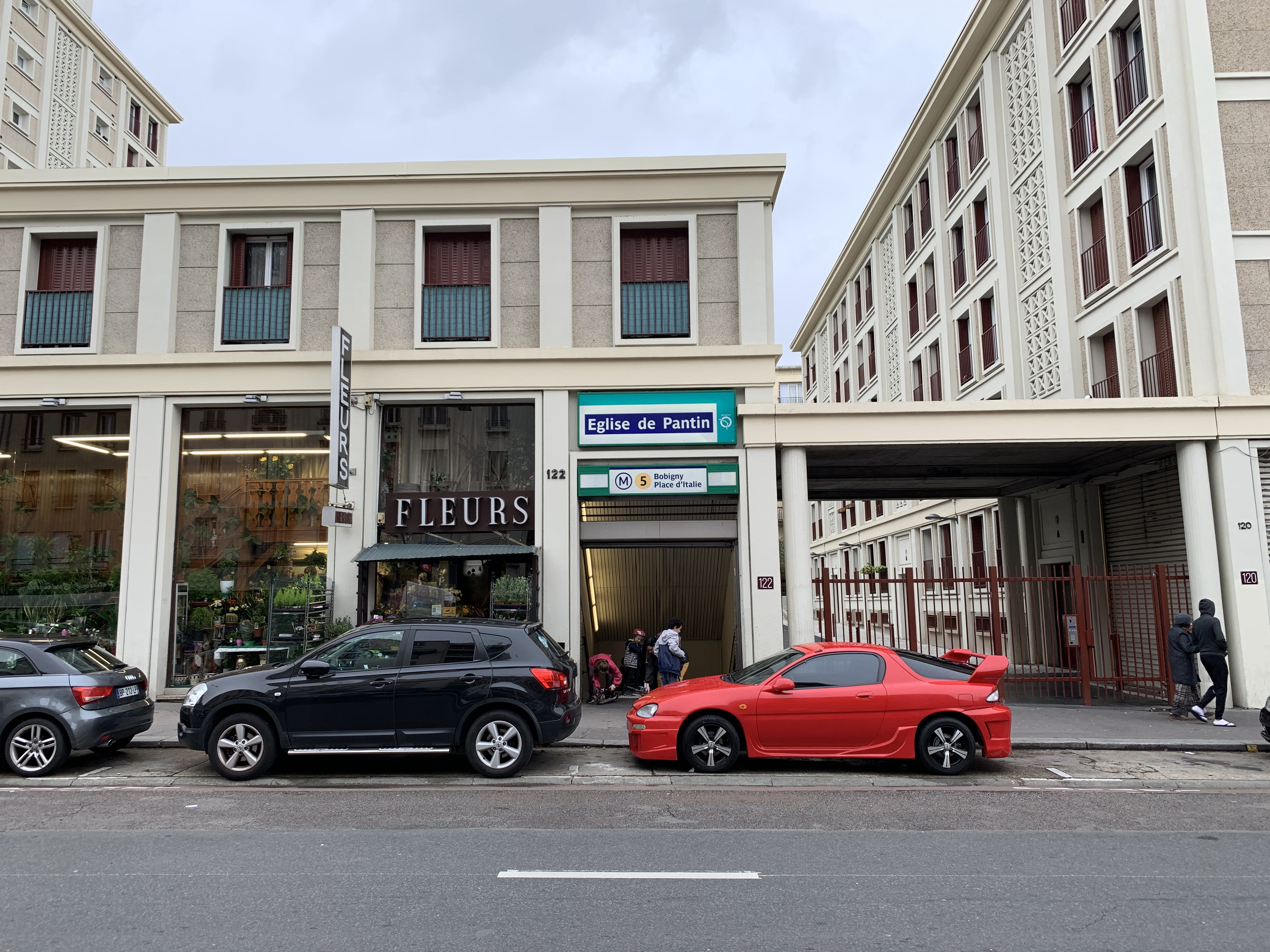
Access 4

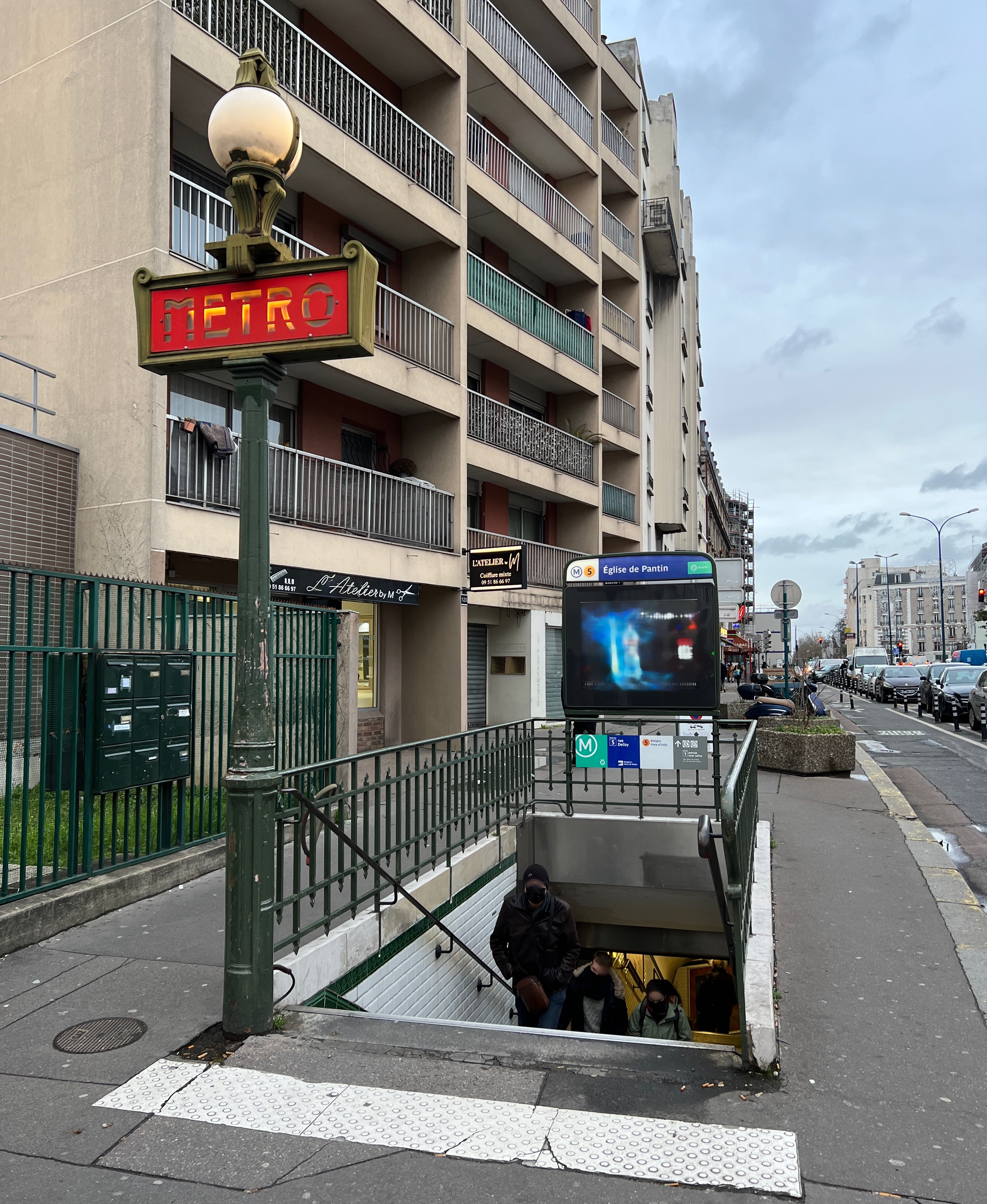
Access 5

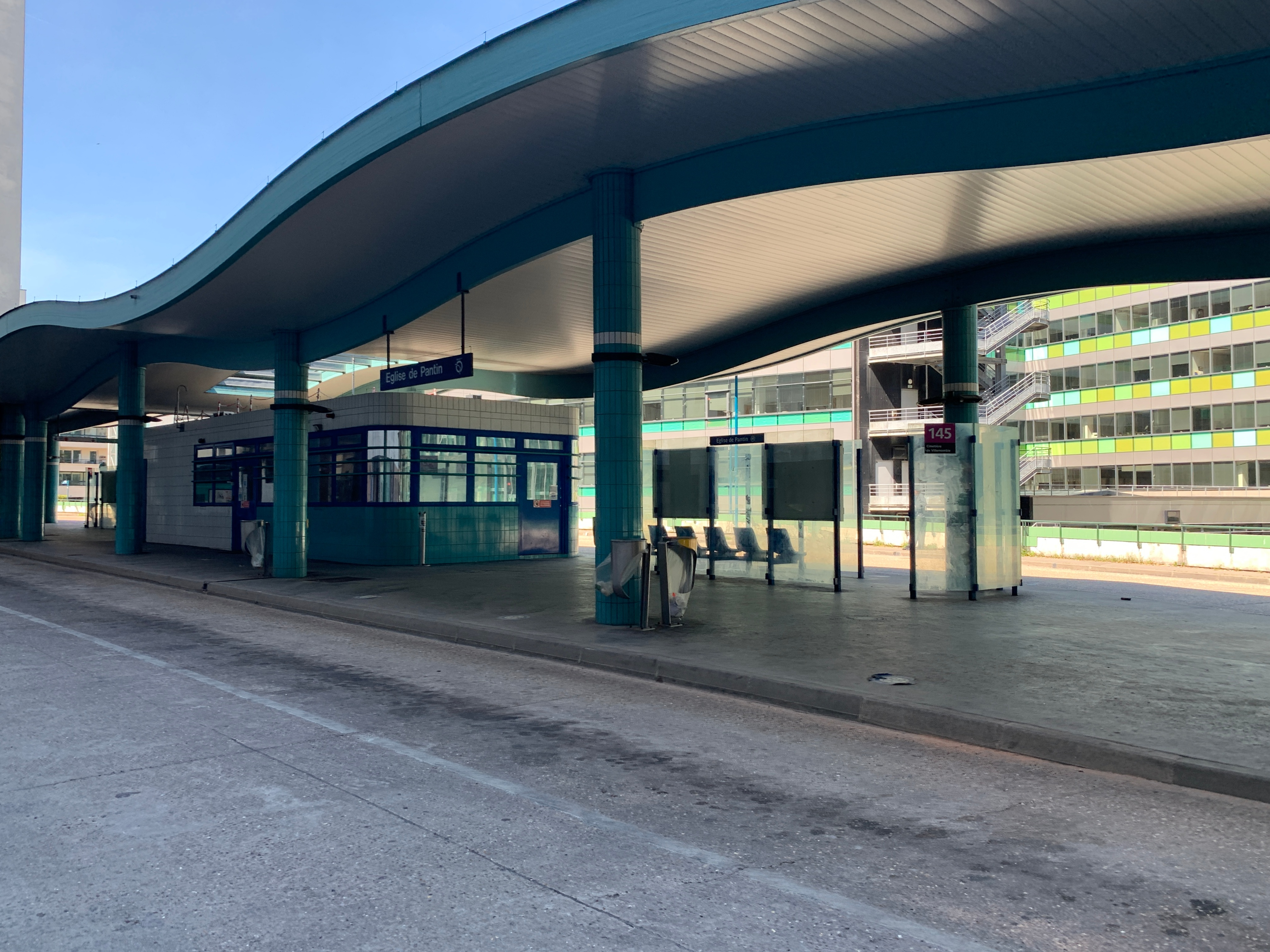
The bus station at access 2
