= Bobigny–Pantin–Raymond Queneau station =

Metro station in Paris, France

Bobigny–Pantin Raymond Queneau
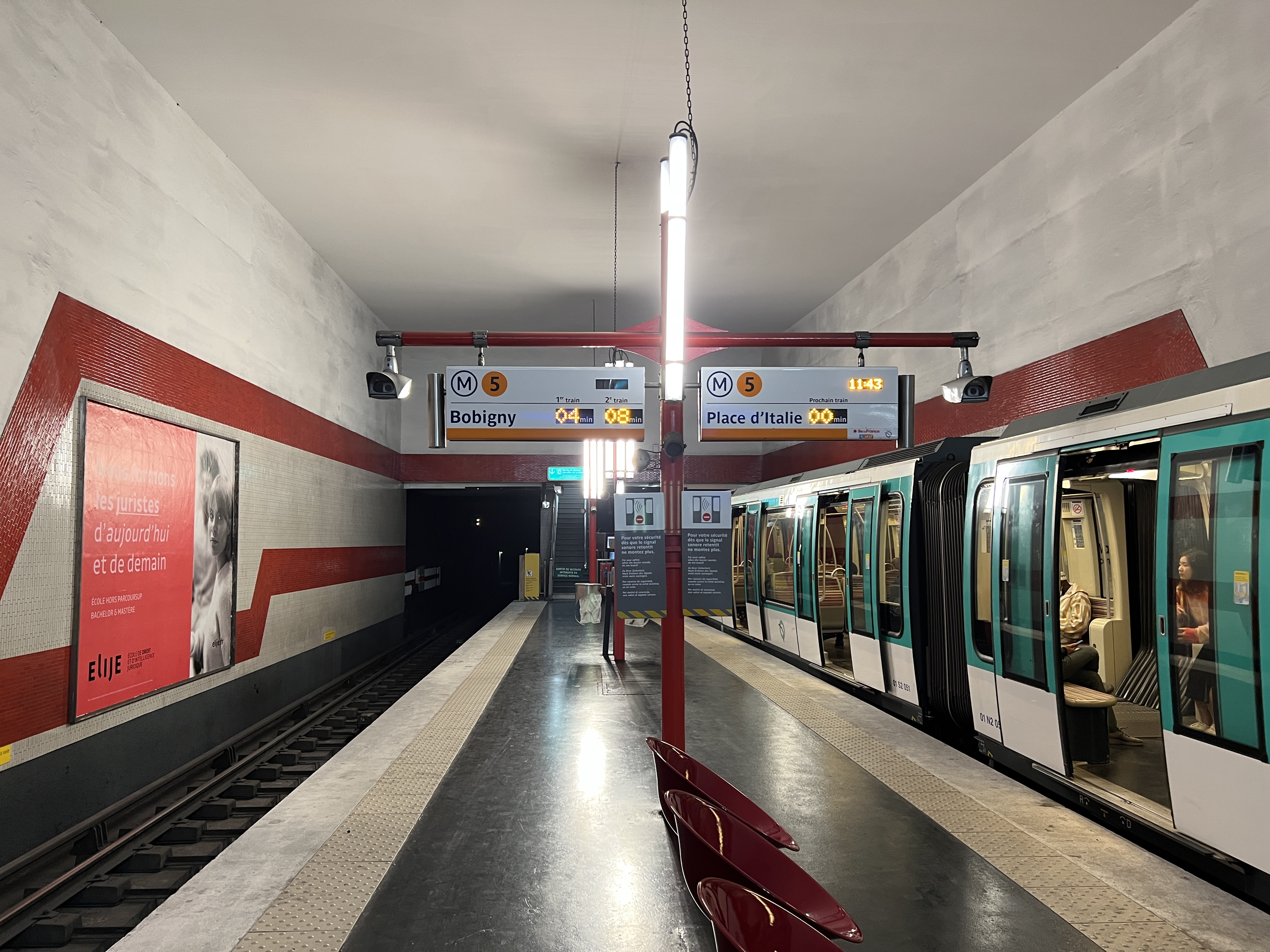
- MF 01 at Bobigny–Pantin Raymond Queneau

General information
- Location: 7, Rue de Paris; 280, Av. Jean Lolive; Bobigny; Île-de-France; France
- Coordinates: 48°53′42″N 2°25′30″E
- Owner: RATP
- Operator: RATP
- Line: Paris Metro Paris Metro Line 5
- Platforms: 2 (2 side platforms)
- Tracks: 2

Construction
- Accessible: No

Other information
- Station code: 03-11
- Fare zone: 2

History
- Opened: 25 April 1985

Passengers
- 2,335,465 (2021)

Services
Preceding station	Paris Metro	Following station
Église de Pantin towards Place d'Italie	Line 5	Bobigny–Pablo Picasso Terminus
Location
- Location within Paris

Bobigny–Pantin–Raymond Queneau (French pronunciation: [bɔbiɲi pɑ̃tɛ̃ ʁɛmɔ̃ kəno]) is a station on line 5 of the Paris Métro, located on the border between the communes of Pantin and Bobigny, in Seine-Saint-Denis, Île-de-France. It is named after the communes of Bobigny and Pantin, as well as the nearby rue Raymond Queneau, named after Raymond Queneau (1903-1976), a 20th-century French author and member of the Oulipo group whose most famous works were Zazie dans le métro and Exercices de style, set on a bus. Despite its name, the station serves mainly Pantin (district of Petit-Pantin) and Romainville (district of the Bas-Pays). It only serves a thin industrial fringe in Bobigny.

== History ==
The station opened on 25 April 1985 with the extension of the line from Église de Pantin to Bobigny–Pablo Picasso.

In 2024, it will be served by line 3 of the T Zen network, a bus rapid transit system. It was originally slated to open 2018, then postponed to the end of 2022, then again to 2024.

In 2019, the station was used by 2,951,030 passengers, making it the 178th busiest of the Métro network out of 302 stations.

In 2020, the station was used by 1,726,493 passengers amidst the COVID-19 pandemic, making it the 143rd busiest of the Métro network out of 305 stations.

In 2021, the station was used by 2,335,465 passengers, making it the 144th busiest of the Métro network out of 304 stations.

== Passenger services ==
=== Access ===
The station has two accesses:

- Access 1: avenue de Paris
- Access 2: avenue Anatole France (with an ascending escalator)

=== Station layout ===
Street Level
B1	Mezzanine
Line 5 platforms	Southbound	← toward Place d'Italie (Église de Pantin)
Line 5 platforms	Island platform, doors will open on the left
Line 5 platforms	Northbound	toward Bobigny–Pablo Picasso (Terminus) →

=== Platforms ===
The station has a single island platform flanked by two tracks, with stairs leading to a mezzanine and an emergency staircase at the end of the platform.

=== Other connections ===
The station is also served by lines 145,147, 318, and 330 of the RATP Bus Network, and at night, by the line N45 of the Noctilien network.

== Nearby ==
- Canal de l'Ourcq
- Est Ensemble
- Technicentre Est Européen

== Gallery ==
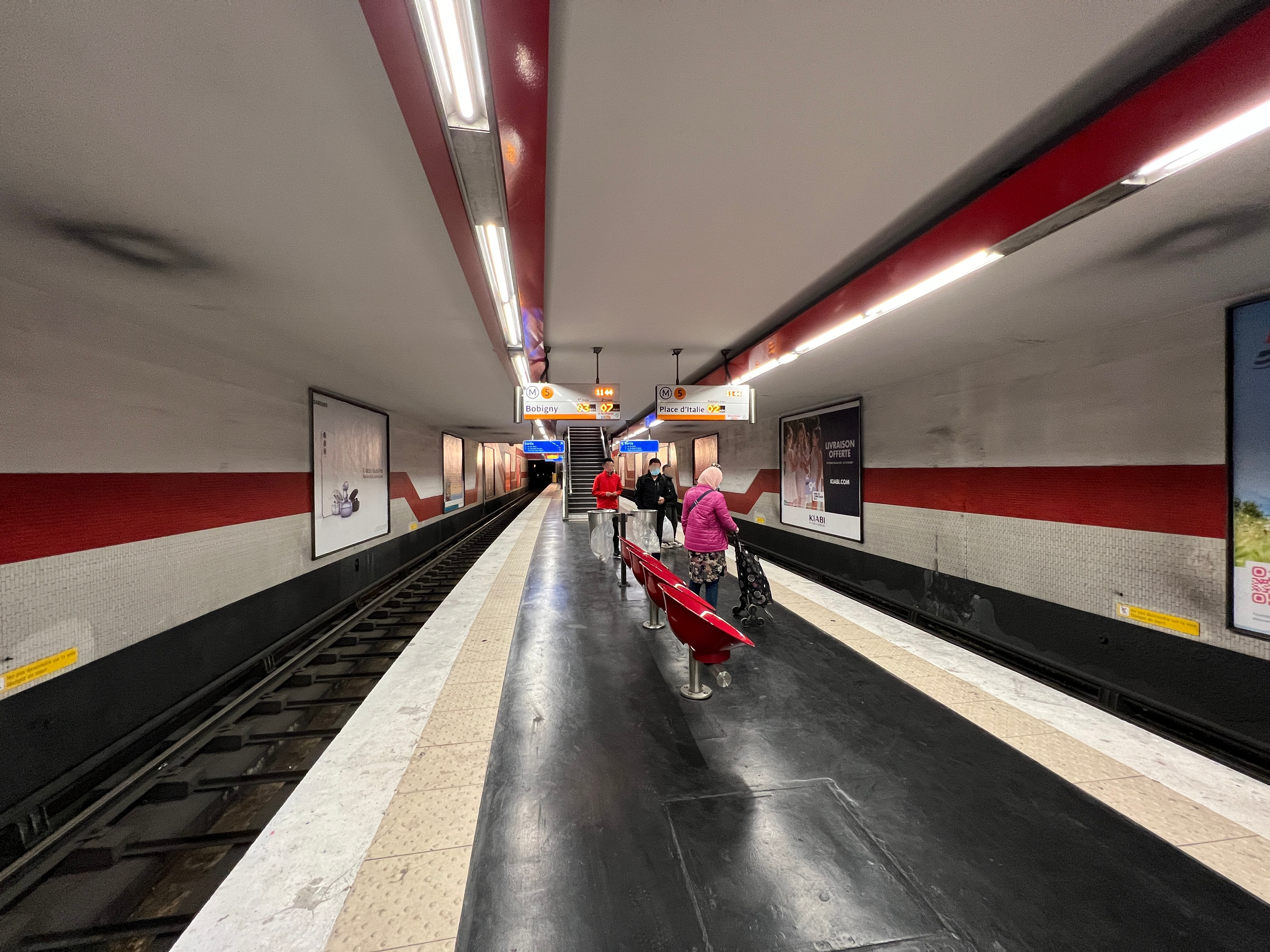
Platforms

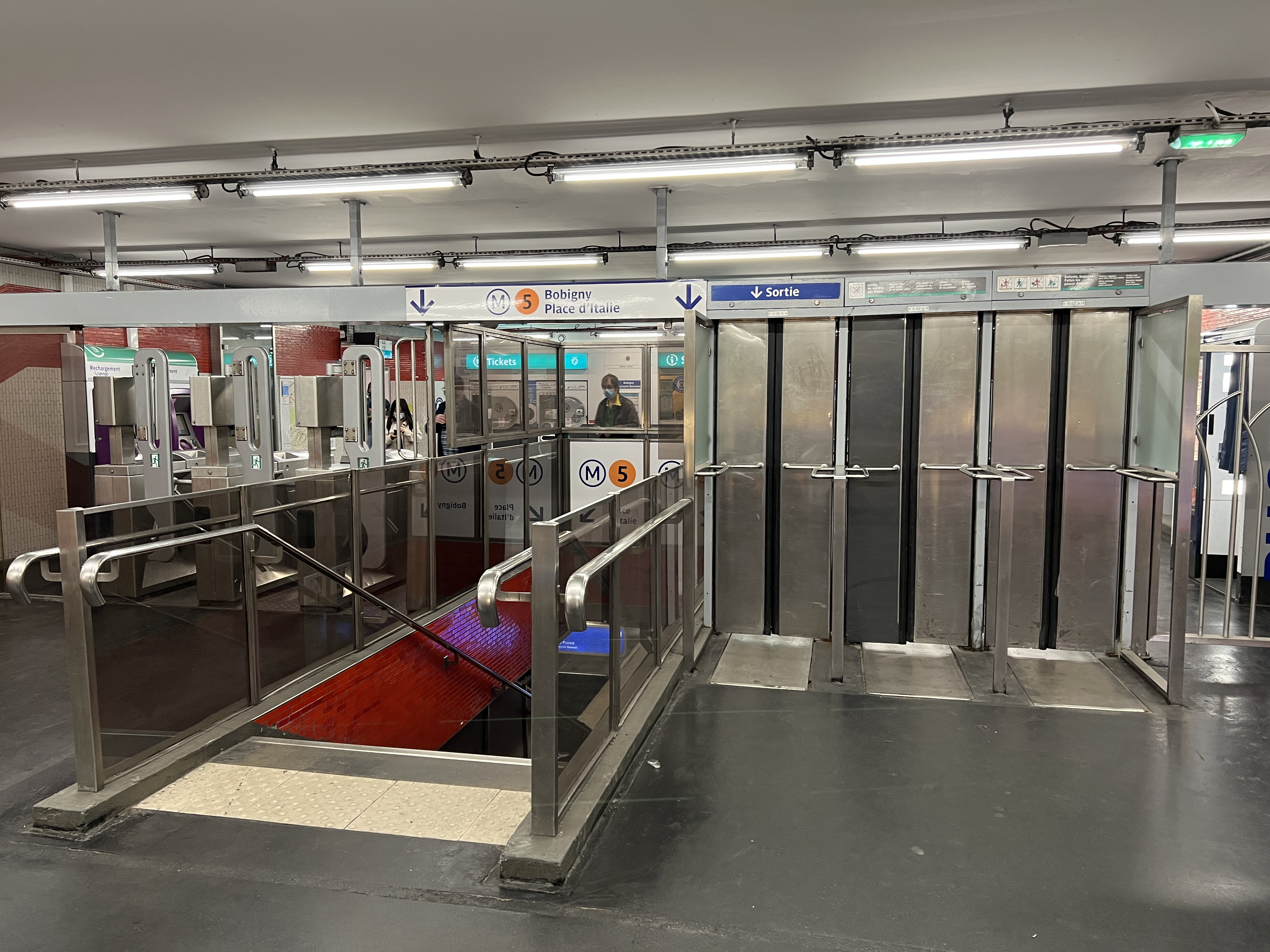
Mezzanine

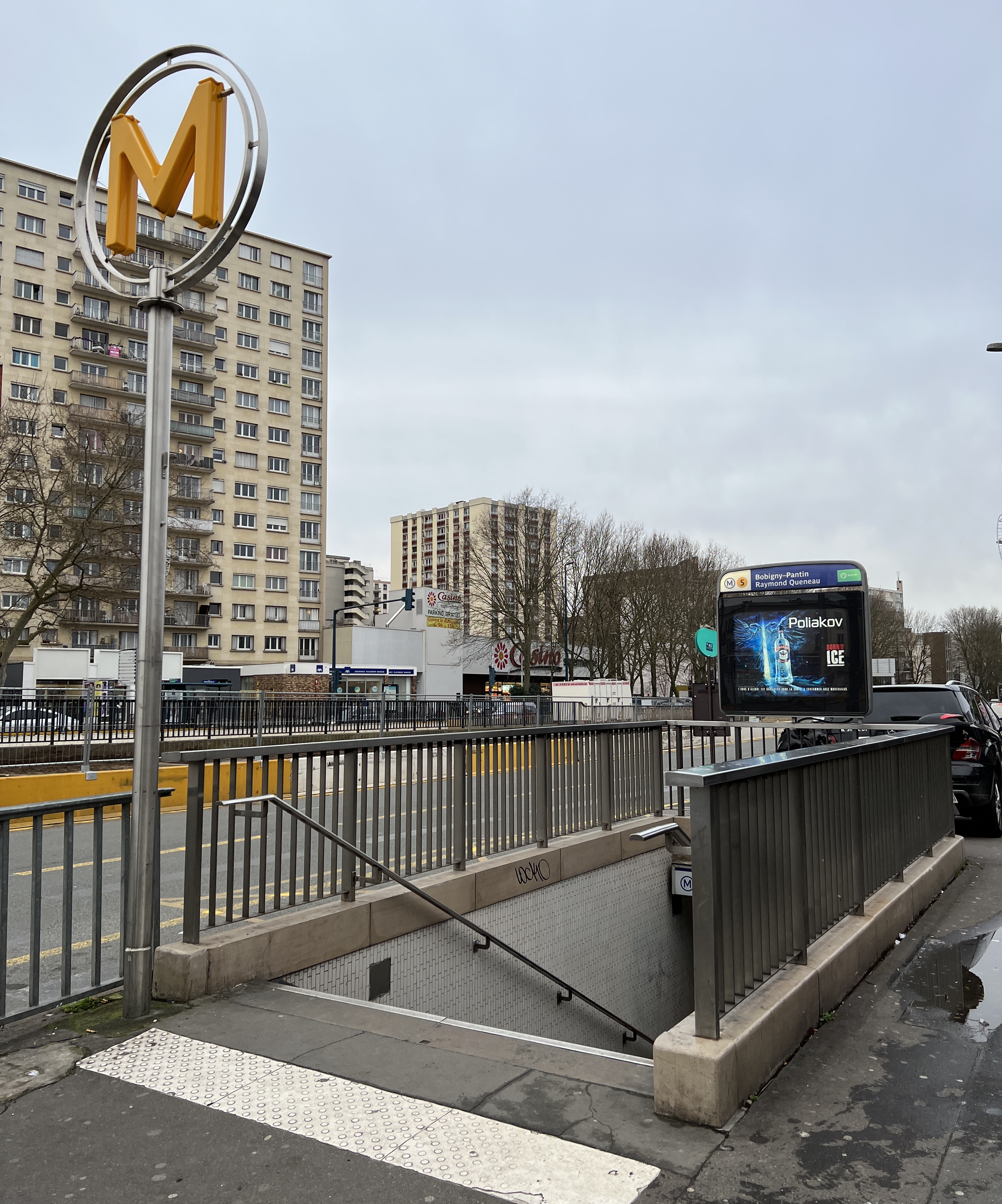
Access 1

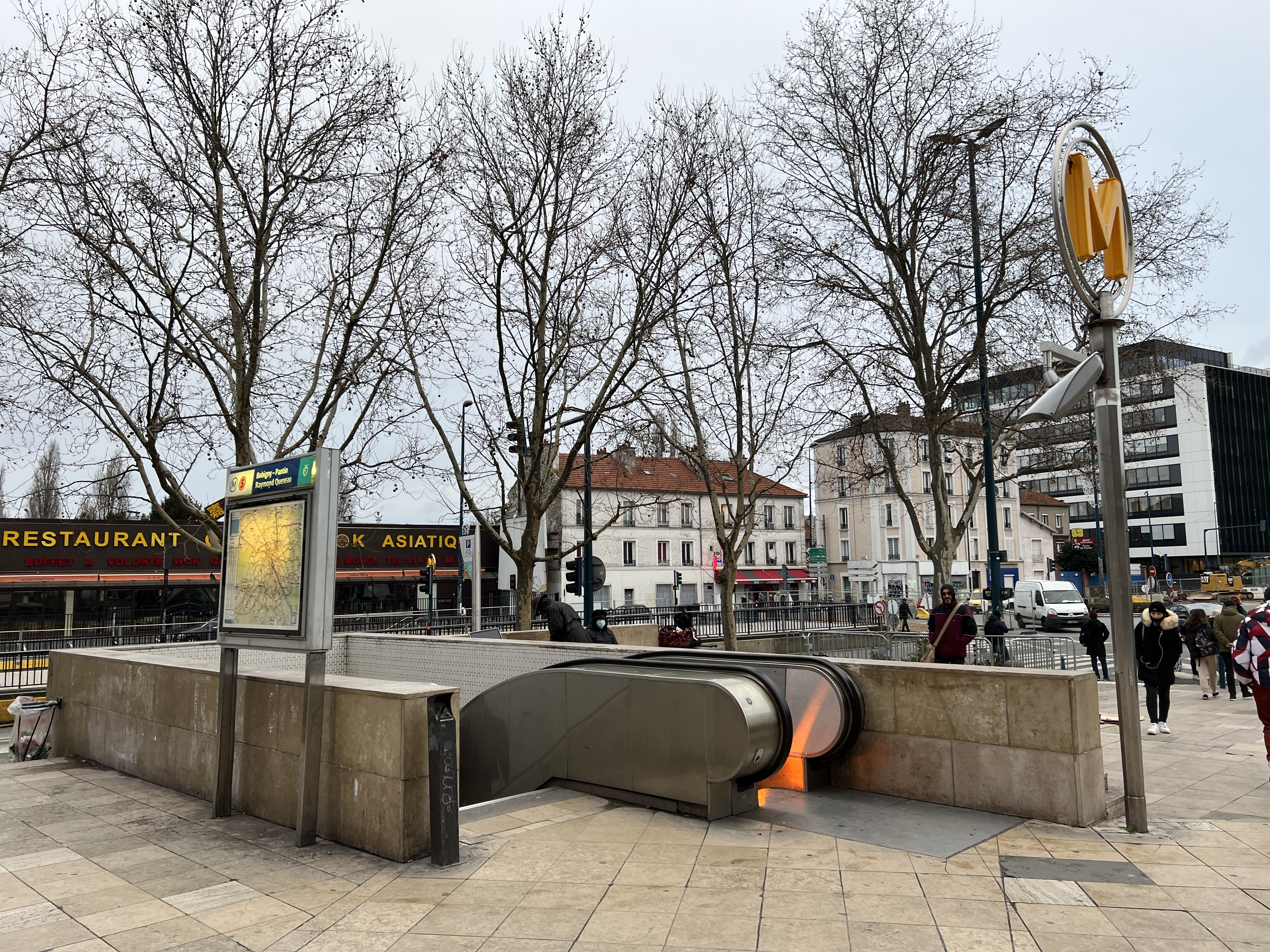
Access 2
