= Hôtel de Ville, Pantin =

Town hall in Pantin, France

Hôtel de Ville
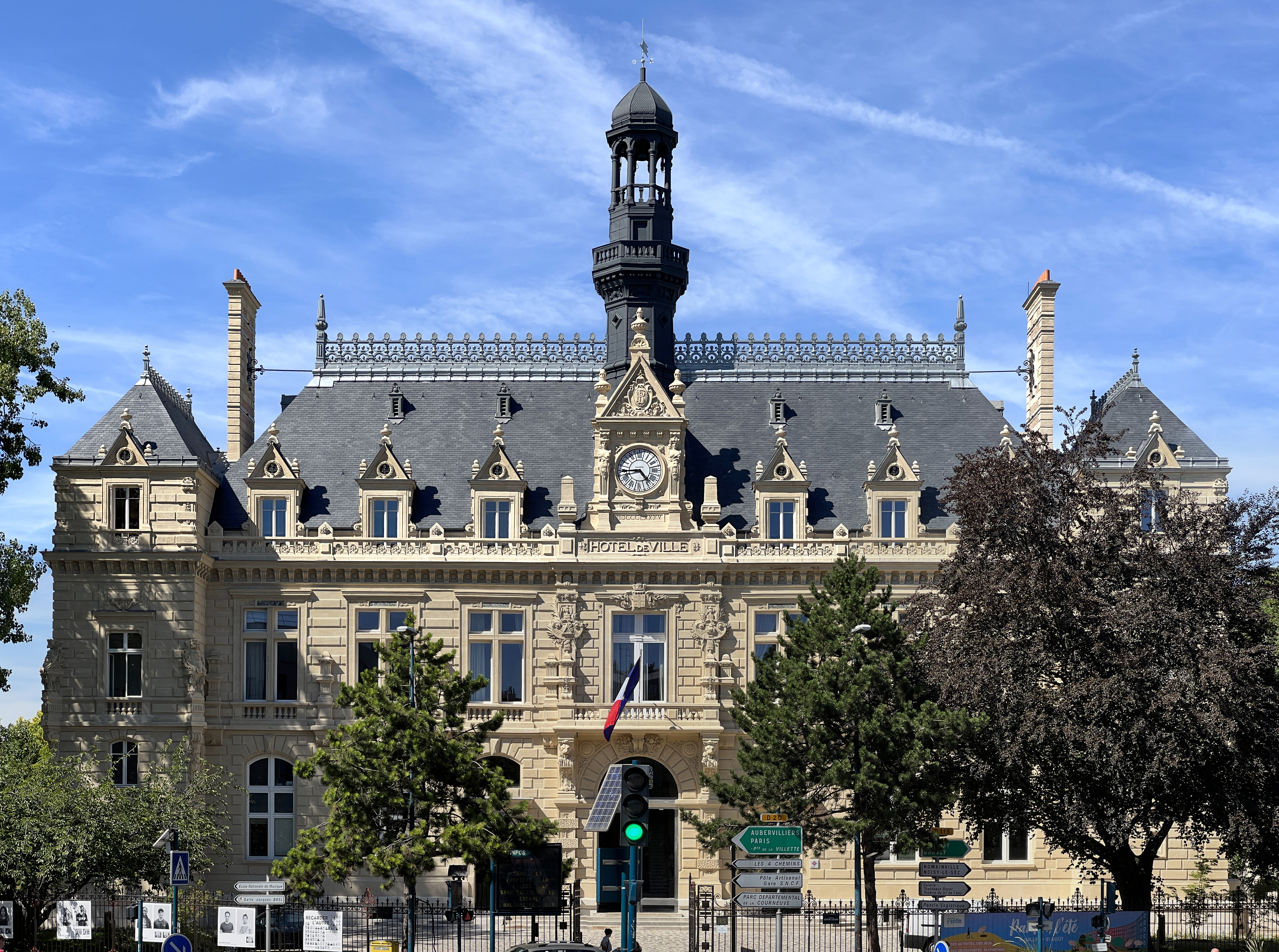
- The main frontage of the Hôtel de Ville in July 2022

General information
- Type: City hall
- Architectural style: Renaissance Revival style
- Location: Pantin, France
- Coordinates: 48.8969°N 2.4012°E
- Completed: 1886

Design and construction
- Architects: Raulin Gustave and Guélorget Léon

Monument historique
- Official name: Hôtel de ville
- Type: Inscrit
- Designated: 2017
- Reference no.: PA93000074

The Hôtel de Ville (French pronunciation: [otɛl də vil], City Hall) is a municipal building in Pantin, Seine-Saint-Denis in the northeastern suburbs of Paris, standing on Avenue du Général Leclerc. It was designated a monument historique by the French government in 2017.

== History ==
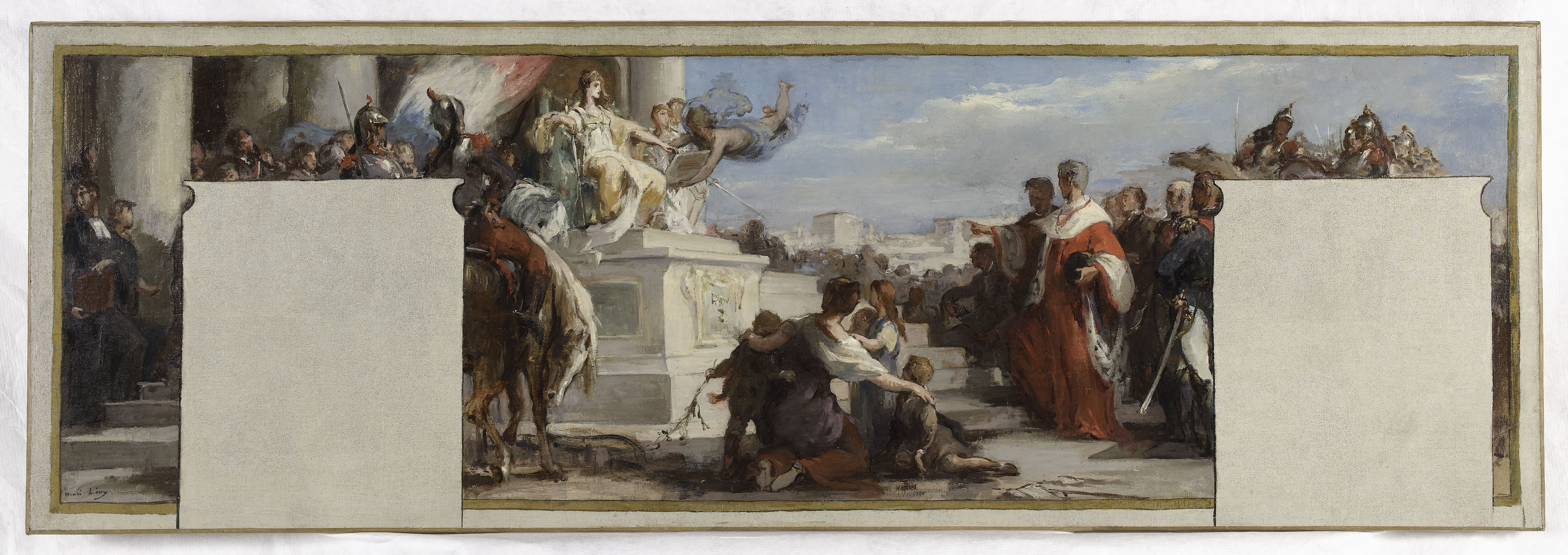
Painting by Henri-Léopold Lévy in the Salle des Mariages (wedding room)

The first municipal building in Pantin was a private house on Grand-Rue (now Avenue Jean-Lolive). This was a substantial property which dated back at least to the mid-18th century. It served as the home of the playwright, Pierre Beaumarchais, in the second half of the 18th century and was then acquired by the town council in 1855. Internally, the principal rooms included the Salle des Mariages (wedding room). Fine panels, which had decorated the house the ballet dancer, Marie-Madeleine Guimard, who had lived nearby, were installed in the room.

In August 1870, in the context of the threat of the Franco-Prussian War, the council relocated to the relative safety of No. 139 Rue d'Allemagne in central Paris. After the threat had subsided, the council led by the mayor, Simon Clovis Delizy, decided to commission a new town hall. The site they selected was at the corner of the two streets now known as Avenue du Général Leclerc and Avenue Édouard Vaillant. The building was designed by Raulin Gustave and Guélorget Léon in the Renaissance Revival style, built in ashlar stone and was officially opened by the president of France, Jules Grévy, on 31 October 1886.

The design involved a symmetrical main frontage of nine bays facing the junction of the two streets with the end bays projected forward as pavilions. The central bay featured a round headed doorway with voussoirs flanked by brackets supporting a balustraded balcony. There was a French door on the first floor and a clock flanked by pilasters supporting a triangular pediment and three finials at roof level. There was an octagonal lantern behind the clock. The other bays were fenestrated by segmental headed windows with voussoirs on the ground floor, by cross-windows with cornices on the first floor and by dormer windows with occuli in the pediments at attic level. Internally, the principal rooms included a large reception room, which was initially used as the Salle du Conseil (council chamber) but was subsequently converted for use as the Salle des Mariages (wedding room): it was decorated by a fine mural by Henri-Léopold Lévy depicting the law.

During the Paris insurrection, part the Second World War, there was an incident when the French tricolour was hoisted in front of the building but then torn down by German troops. This was a week in advance of the official liberation of the town by the French 2nd Armoured Division, commanded by General Philippe Leclerc, on 25 August 1944.

The building was refurbished between May 2020 and March 2022.
