= Pantin =

- Commune
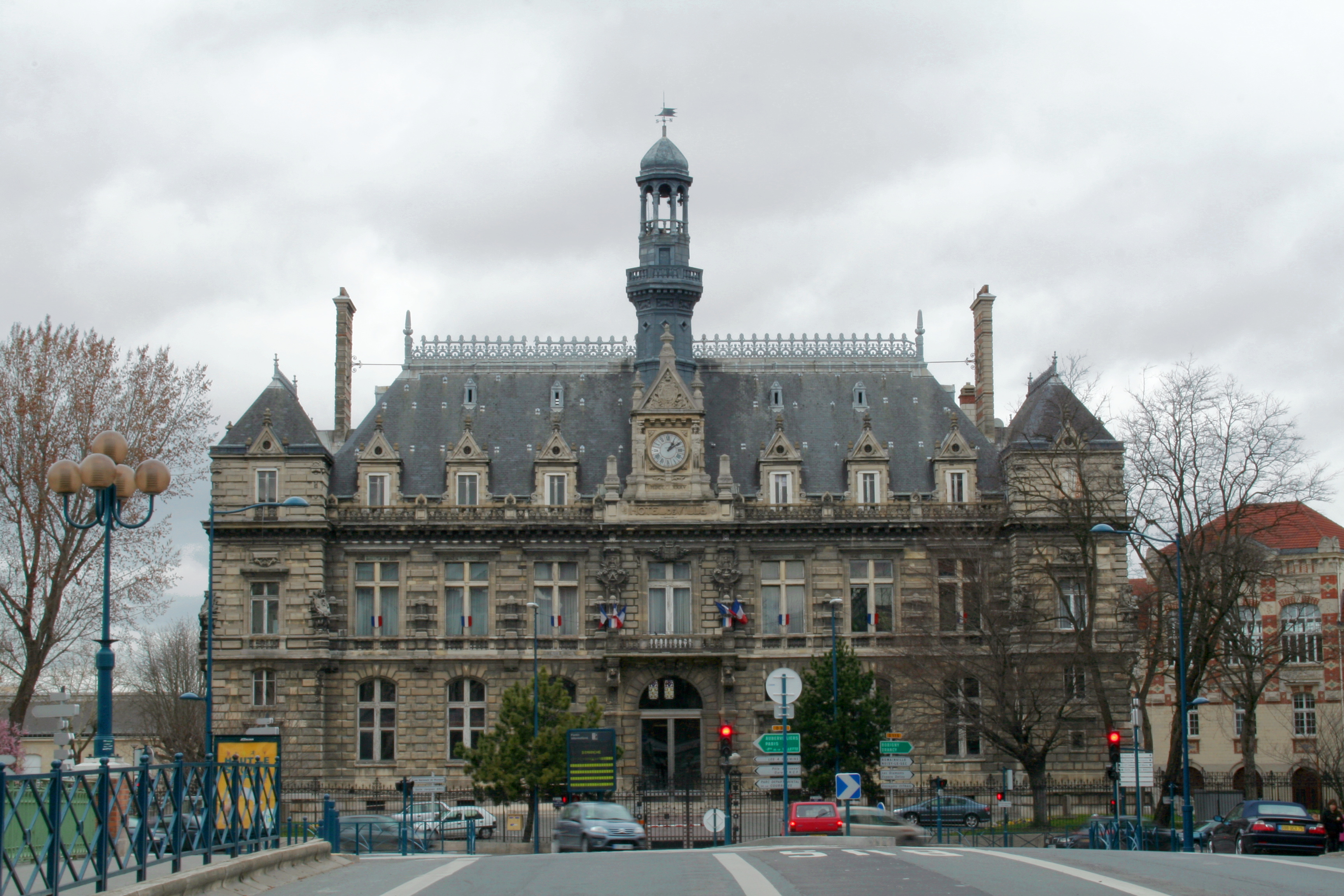
- The Hôtel de Ville

- Coat of arms

- Location (in red) within Paris inner suburbs
- Location of Pantin
- Location within France Location within Île-de-France (region)
- Coordinates: 48°53′48″N 2°24′06″E
- Country: France
- Region: Île-de-France
- Department: Seine-Saint-Denis
- Arrondissement: Bobigny
- Canton: Pantin
- Intercommunality: Grand Paris

Government
  - Mayor (2026–32): Bertrand Kern
- Area^{1}: 5.01 km^{2} (1.93 sq mi)
- Highest elevation: 108 m (354 ft)
- Lowest elevation: 38 m (125 ft)
- Population (2023): 61,929
  - Density: 12,400/km^{2} (32,000/sq mi)
- Time zone: UTC+01:00 (CET)
  - Summer (DST): UTC+02:00 (CEST)
- INSEE/Postal code: 93055 /93500
- ^{1} French Land Register data, which excludes lakes, ponds, glaciers > 1 km^{2} (0.386 sq mi or 247 acres) and river estuaries.

Pantin (French pronunciation: [pɑ̃tɛ̃]) is a commune in the northeastern suburbs of Paris, Île-de-France, France. It is located 6.4 km (4.0 mi) from the centre of Paris. Its population is about 62,000. Pantin is located on the edge of the city of Paris and is mainly formed by a plain crossed by national roadway 2 and 3, the Paris–Strasbourg railway line and the canal de l'Ourcq.

== Geography ==
Pantin borders the Paris Boulevard Périphérique, an inner ring road, and is traversed by national routes N2 and N3, as well as the Paris-Strasbourg railway line and the Ourcq canal.

== Urbanism ==
=== Typology ===
Pantin is an urban commune, as it is one of the dense or intermediate density communes, as defined by the Insee communal density grid. (Note: According to the zoning of rural and urban municipalities published in November 2020, in application of the new definition of rurality validated on November 14, 2020 by the Interministerial Committee for Rural Areas.) It belongs to the urban unit of Paris, an inter-departmental conurbation comprising 407 communes and 10,785,092 inhabitants in 2017, of which it is a suburban commune.

The commune is also part of the functional area of Paris (Note: In October 2020, the concept of functional area replaced that of urban area in order to enable consistent comparisons with other European Union countries) where it is located in the main population and employment centre of the functional area. This area comprises 1,929 communes.

=== Urban morphology ===
Map of neighbourhoods

The main quarters or neighborhoods of the commune are:

- Mairie - Hoche
- Quatre-Chemins
- Petit Pantin - Les Limites
- Église
- Les Courtillières

=== Development projects ===
Jacqueline Osty, winner of the Grand Prix de l'urbanisme in 2020, designed the 3.5 hectares (8.6 acres) of public spaces on the port site. She has forged a common base, preserving a continuous, mineral spirit, evocative of the port area's past, with a light use of vegetation in the form of long, straight grassed lines and green lounges between the housing developments.

== Toponymy ==
The name Pantin was recorded for the first time in 1067 as Pentini, perhaps from the Roman patronym Pentinus, a variant of Pantaenus or Repentinus, but this etymology is not certain.

The first known deed in which the name Penthinum appears is a deed from the 11th century granting the Pantin estate to the Saint-Martin-des-Champs Priory.

The name of Pantin is mentioned in the following forms:

- Pentinus in 1082;
- Pantinum in 1119;
- Pentin in 1151-1157;
- Pantin in 1256;
- Panthino in 1352;
- Panthin in 1499;
- Penthin in 1520;
- Pentin in 1598.

In 2023 the name was changed symbolically to Pantine, with an added "e" ending to indicate the feminine form and promote awareness of women's issues.

== History ==
On 1 January 1860, the city of Paris was enlarged by annexing neighbouring communes. On that occasion, a small part of the commune of Pantin was annexed to Paris.

On 24 July 1867, a part of the territory of Pantin was detached and merged with a part of the territory of Romainville and a part of the territory of Bagnolet to create the commune of Les Lilas.

By 1875, the Canal de l'Ourcq (Ourcq canal) and new railway lines served to divide the town into two parts—the "Village" and the "Quatre Chemins". The Hôtel de Ville was completed in 1886.

=== Heraldry ===
arms of Pantin	The arms of Pantin are blazoned : Argent a cross between four mullets pierced all gules.
motto: Hardy Pantin en avant (forward Hardy Pantin)

== Future ==
The construction of a science park along the Bassin de la Villette on the former site of city abattoirs has improved pedestrian access to Paris, as well as encouraging urban regeneration in Pantin itself. A key policy discussed since the 2008 mayoral election has been the possibility of integrating the ten banlieue towns of Bagnolet, Les Lilas, Le Pré-Saint-Gervais, Romainville, Pantin, Noisy-le-Sec, Montreuil, Bobigny, Bondy and Rosny-sous-Bois into an "intercommune" of around 440,000 people. This new municipality could be created as early as January 2010. This project was implemented, it gathers nine communes. In 2016, Pantin was declared France's most polluted town by the World Health Organization.

== Demographics ==
Historical population

Year	Pop.	±% p.a.
1793	1,172	—
1800	926	−3.31%
1806	1,154	+3.74%
1821	1,020	−0.82%
1831	1,871	+6.25%
1836	1,906	+0.37%
1841	2,323	+4.04%
1846	3,047	+5.58%
1851	2,657	−2.70%
1856	3,909	+8.03%
1861	4,842	+4.37%
1866	8,563	+12.08%
1872	12,337	+6.27%
1876	13,665	+2.59%
1881	17,857	+5.50%
1886	19,170	+1.43%
1891	21,847	+2.65%
1896	25,586	+3.21%
1901	29,716	+3.04%

Year	Pop.	±% p.a.
1906	32,696	+1.93%
1911	36,359	+2.15%
1921	38,975	+0.70%
1926	39,189	+0.11%
1931	37,260	−1.00%
1936	37,716	+0.24%
1946	36,242	−0.40%
1954	36,963	+0.25%
1962	46,292	+2.85%
1968	47,607	+0.47%
1975	42,739	−1.53%
1982	43,553	+0.27%
1990	47,303	+1.04%
1999	49,919	+0.60%
2007	53,315	+0.83%
2012	53,060	−0.10%
2017	57,482	+1.61%
2023	61,929	+1.25%

Source: EHESS and INSEE

=== Immigration ===
Place of birth of residents of Pantin in 1999
Born in metropolitan France	Born outside metropolitan France			
68.5%	31.5%			
68.5%	Born in overseas France	Born in foreign countries with French citizenship at birth^{1}	EU-15 immigrants^{2}	Non-EU-15 immigrants
68.5%	3.3%	3.1%	3.2%	21.9%
^{1} This group is made up largely of former French settlers, such as pieds-noirs in Northwest Africa, followed by former colonial citizens who had French citizenship at birth (such as was often the case for the native elite in French colonies), as well as to a lesser extent foreign-born children of French expatriates. A foreign country is understood as a country not part of France in 1999, so a person born for example in 1950 in Algeria, when Algeria was an integral part of France, is nonetheless listed as a person born in a foreign country in French statistics.^{2} An immigrant is a person born in a foreign country not having French citizenship at birth. An immigrant may have acquired French citizenship since moving to France, but is still considered an immigrant in French statistics. On the other hand, persons born in France with foreign citizenship (the children of immigrants) are not listed as immigrants.

== Economy ==
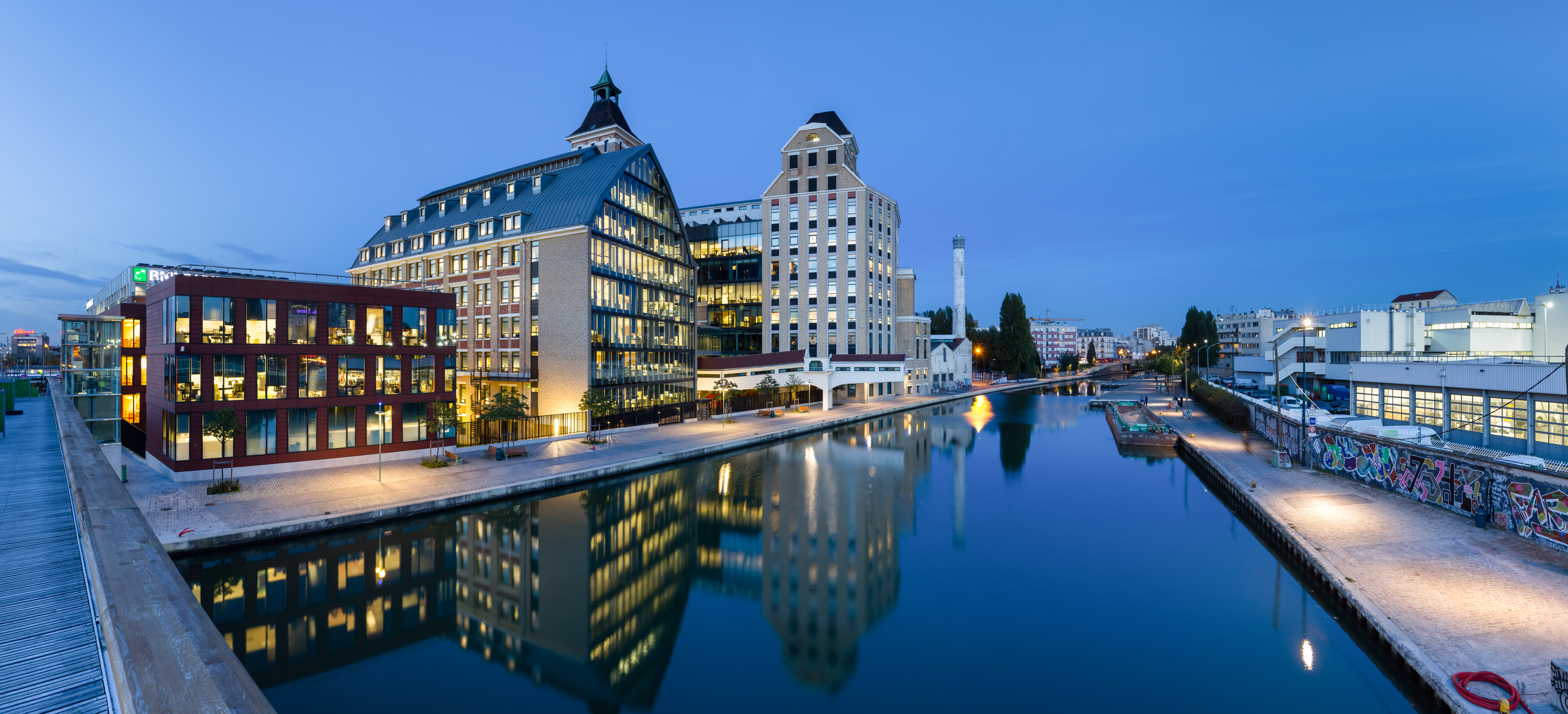
Pantin Mills, headquarters of BNP Paribas Securities Services since 2009.

Pantin was once the site of Motobecane's operations.

2,000 companies are located in Pantin, including 21 of more than 100 employees. Huge firms are located in the town, like Hermès (580 jobs – upholstery and luxury luggage), Bourjois, Chanel, Gucci, Agnès b., Sergent-Major, Elis (500 jobs – linen rental), Forclum, UTB (400 jobs – public works), Photovista Legrand, BNP Paribas, Boiron, Alliance Healthcare, Vetura, Fabio Lucci ... and publishers as computer Software Arkeia Software and MT Software.

3,000 employees of BNP Paribas Securities Services were installed in the historic building Grands Moulins de Pantin at the end of October 2009.

Hermès finished an expansion project in the city center.

The city has created a "craft center" to "4 Chemins" especially with the House Revel to promote arts jobs.

Pantin is home to a hub of non-profit environmental organization, housed since 2014 in the "cité de l'environnement", like Bruitparif, the noise observatory of Île-de-France that monitors the environmental noise in the Paris agglomeration.

== Administration ==
Since the French canton reform which came into effect in March 2015, Pantin is part of the canton of Pantin, which also includes the commune Le Pré-Saint-Gervais.

The current mayor of Pantin is Bertrand Kern of the Parti Socialiste (PS). Kern was re-elected in 2026 for a fifth 6-year mayoral term.

== Transport ==
Pantin is served by three stations on Paris Metro line 5: Hoche, Église de Pantin, and Bobigny–Pantin–Raymond Queneau.

Pantin is also served by Aubervilliers–Pantin–Quatre Chemins station on Paris Metro line 7.

Pantin is also served by Pantin station on Paris RER line E.

Finally Pantin is served by numerous bus lines (151, 152, 249, 148). Outside the hours of normal public transport the town is served by the N13 and N142 Noctilien night bus services with stops outside the Centre de la Danse, the Mairie and Rue Delizy.

Pantin is recently served by the tramway 3b (Delphine Seyrig; Elle Fitzerald: Grands Moulins de Pantin).

== Education ==
The commune has 11 preschools, 11 elementary schools (including one specialised school), four public junior high schools, one private junior high school, and three public senior high schools.

- Public junior high schools: Jean-Jaurès, Jean-Lolive, Joliot-Curie, and Lavoisier
- Private junior high school: Collège Prive Saint-Joseph-la-Salle
- Public senior high schools: Lycée Lucie-Aubrac, Lycée Simone-Weil, and Lycée Marcelin-Berthelot
- Le Centre national de la Danse(CND) Créé en 1998, est un établissement public entièrement dévolu à la danse, implanté à la fois à Pantin.

== Personalities ==
- Jean-François Joseph Geffrard de La Motte, count de Sanois, was Lord of Pantin before the Revolution.
- Beaumarchais, writer, owned land in Pantin
- La Guimard (1743–1816), danser of the Opera
- Léon Jouhaux (1879–1954), syndicalist and Nobel Peace
- Jean-Marc Mormeck (born in 1972), boxing champion
- Faïza Guène (born in 1985), novelist

Pantin was the birthplace of:

- Jean-Luc Chaignaud (born in 1959), baritone
- Pierre Desproges (1939–1988), humorist
- Philippe Delorme (born 1960), historian and journalist
- Jérôme Guedj (born 1972), politician
- André Lagache (1885–1938), racing driver
- Gabriel Obertan (born 1989), footballer playing for Levski (Sofia)

== Culture ==
Pantin is twin cities with the Modigliani Art Center in Scandicci, a suburb of Florence, Italy, which inaugurated their XXXIV Year Salon of Painting with the Pantin art association, Les Amis des Arts.

The Centre national de la danse (CND, or National Dance Center) is an institution sponsored by the French Ministry of Culture. It studies dance in all its aspects, and is located in Pantin. The building is known for being a classic example of Brutalist architecture, and in 2004 was awarded the Prix de l'Équerre d'Argent.

== Religion ==
- Catholic church
- Islam
- Judaism
- Macedonian Orthodox church
- Reformed church

== See also ==
- Cimetière parisien de Pantin
- Communes of the Seine-Saint-Denis department

== Bibliography ==
- Jean-Pierre Thiollet: "Pantin sans "e" ni tête", in Hallier, tout feu tout flamme, Neva Editions, 2023, p. 65-68 ISBN 978-2-35055-309-2
