= Bruitparif =

French environmental non-profit organization

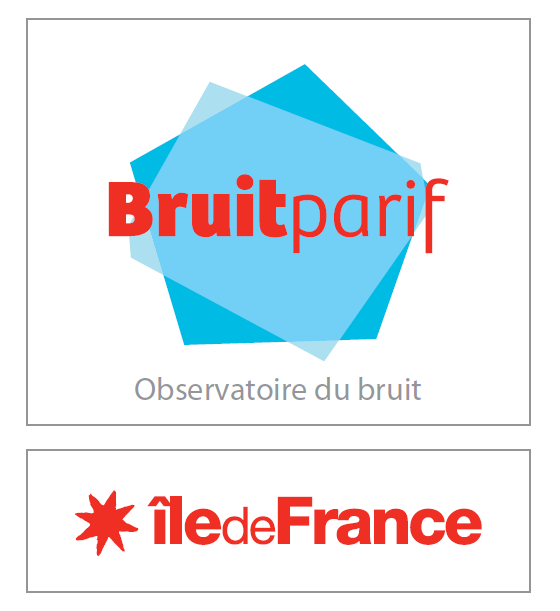
- Founded: 2004
- Type: Non-profit organisation
- Purpose: Noise monitoring in Paris agglomeration
- Location: Pantin, Seine Saint-Denis
- Region served: Île-de-France
- Employees: around 11
- Website: bruitparif.fr

Bruitparif is a non-profit environmental organization responsible for monitoring the environmental noise in the Paris agglomeration. It was founded in 2004.

== Mission ==
Bruitparif is a non-profit organisation accredited by the région Île-de-France, and the Ministry of Environment to monitor the environmental noise in Île-de-France. Its missions meet a regulatory requirement and come in three functions:

- Measurements and assessments
- Support to public policies
- Awareness actions

Bruitparif monitor continuously a network of 45 long-term measurement stations named "Rumeur". They contribute to the assessment of health risks and environmental impacts though campaigns of awareness in schools and general media.

== Harmonica Index ==
In 2014, Bruitparif and Acoucité created a European wide noise index named "Harmonica".

== The Rumeur network ==
"Rumeur" is a network of 45 long-term measurement stations spread across the region Île-de-France.

== The Sonopode ==
Bruitparif designed a specific autonomous equipment to house the measurement station. The sonopode contains a noise station, acoustic detection, wind station and a methanol fuel cell.

== See also ==
- Noise pollution, Environmental noise
- Noise map
- Sound level meter, Acoustical Engineering
- Health effects from noise
