= Bobigny–Pablo Picasso station =

Metro station in Paris, France

Bobigny–Pablo Picasso Préfecture–Hôtel du Département
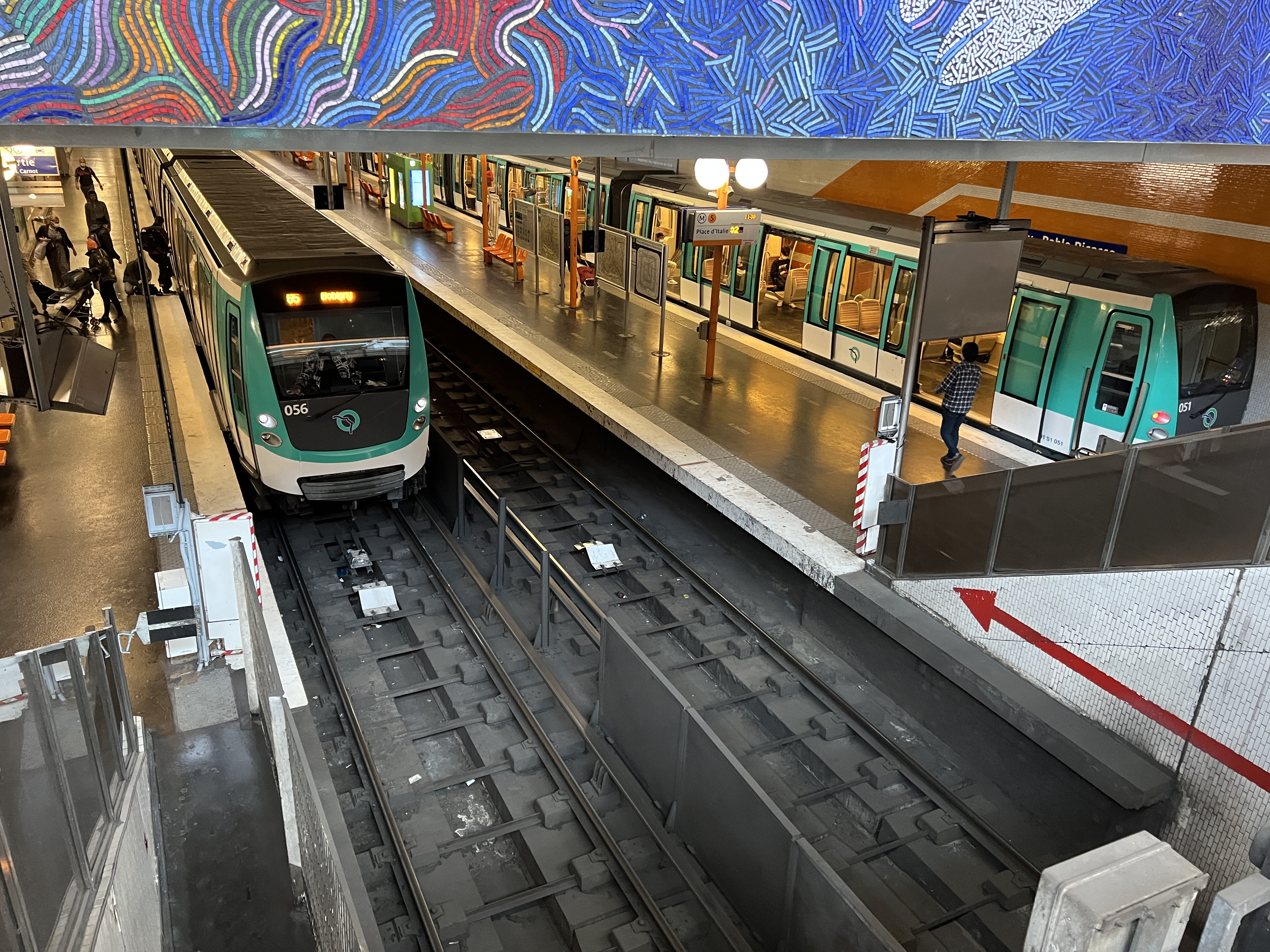
- MF 01 rolling stock at Bobigny–Pablo Picasso in 2022

General information
- Location: Rue Pablo Picasso × Boul. Maurice Thorez; Trésorerie Générale de la Seine–Saint-Denis; Gare Routière Bobigny — Pablo Picasso (five); Bobigny; Île-de-France; France
- Coordinates: 48°54′24″N 2°27′00″E
- Owner: RATP
- Operator: RATP
- Line: Paris Metro Paris Metro Line 5
- Platforms: 2 (1 island platform, 1 side platform)
- Tracks: 3

Other information
- Station code: 0312
- Fare zone: 1

History
- Opened: 25 April 1985; 41 years ago

Passengers
- 4,752,569 (2020)

Services
Preceding station	Paris Metro	Following station
Bobigny–Pantin–Raymond Queneau towards Place d'Italie	Line 5	Terminus
Preceding station	Tram	Following station
Hôtel de Ville de Bobigny towards Asnières–Quatre Routes	T1	Jean Rostand towards Noisy-le-Sec
Location
- Location within Paris and inner ring

Bobigny–Pablo Picasso (French pronunciation: [bɔbiɲi pablo pikaso]) is the northern terminus of Line 5 of the Paris Métro, as well as a stop on Île-de-France tramway Line 1. Also, it will be a station on Paris Metro Line 15 in the future. The metro station was opened in 1985, followed by the tram stop seven years later.

The name refers to the commune of Bobigny and to Rue Pablo Picasso, named after the Spanish modern artist Pablo Picasso. In 2013, the station was used by 7,135,266 passengers, which makes it the 38th busiest of the Métro network, out of 302 stations.

In 2020, the station was used by 4,752,569 passengers amidst the COVID-19 pandemic, making it the 20th busiest of the Métro network, out of 305 stations.

== Passenger services ==
=== Access ===
The station has 4 entrances:

- Access 1: Hôtel de Ville
- Access 2: Palais de Justice
- Access 3: Rue Carnot
- Access 4: Prefecture

=== Station layout ===
Street Level

B1	Mezzanine

Line 5 platforms	Southbound	← toward Place d'Italie (Bobigny–Pantin–Raymond Queneau)
Line 5 platforms	Island platform, doors will open on the left, right
Line 5 platforms	Southbound	← toward Place d'Italie (Bobigny–Pantin–Raymond Queneau)
Line 5 platforms	Northbound	Alighting passengers only →
Line 5 platforms	Side platform, doors will open on the right

=== Platforms ===
The station has, as does Porte de Pantin located on the same line, a particular arrangement specific to the stations serving or had served as a terminus. It has three tracks and two platforms. The side platform serves as the arrival platform while the island platform serves as the departure platform. The walls are flush with the platforms and are vertical, with the roof of the station being straight without metal panels, unlike other stations on the network.

A turnback exists 160 meters beyond the station under the rue Pablo-Picasso to allow for trains to reverse due to its role as the terminus.

=== Other connections ===
Since 6 July 1992, the station has been served by tramway T1, and before the extension to Noisy-le-Sec station on 15 December 2003, was its eastern terminus.

A bus station is located above the station and offers connections with lines 146, 148, 234, 251, 301, 303 and 322 of the RATP Bus Network, with lines 615 and 620 of the Transdev TRA bus network, with line 93 of the CIF bus network, with line 8 of the Trans Val de France bus network and, at night, with lines N13, N41, and N45 of the Noctilien network.

== Gallery ==
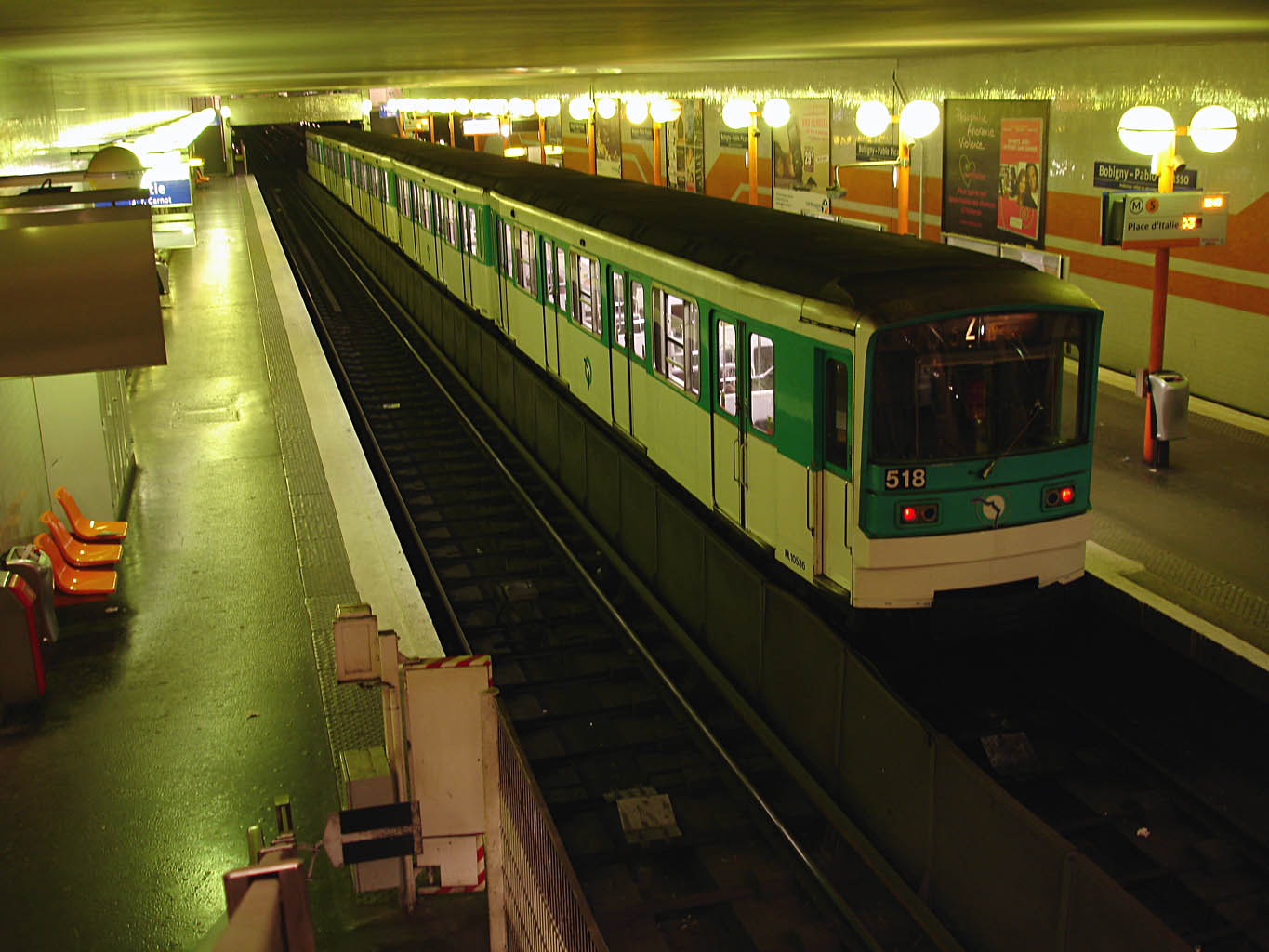
MF 67 rolling stock at Bobigny–Pablo Picasso

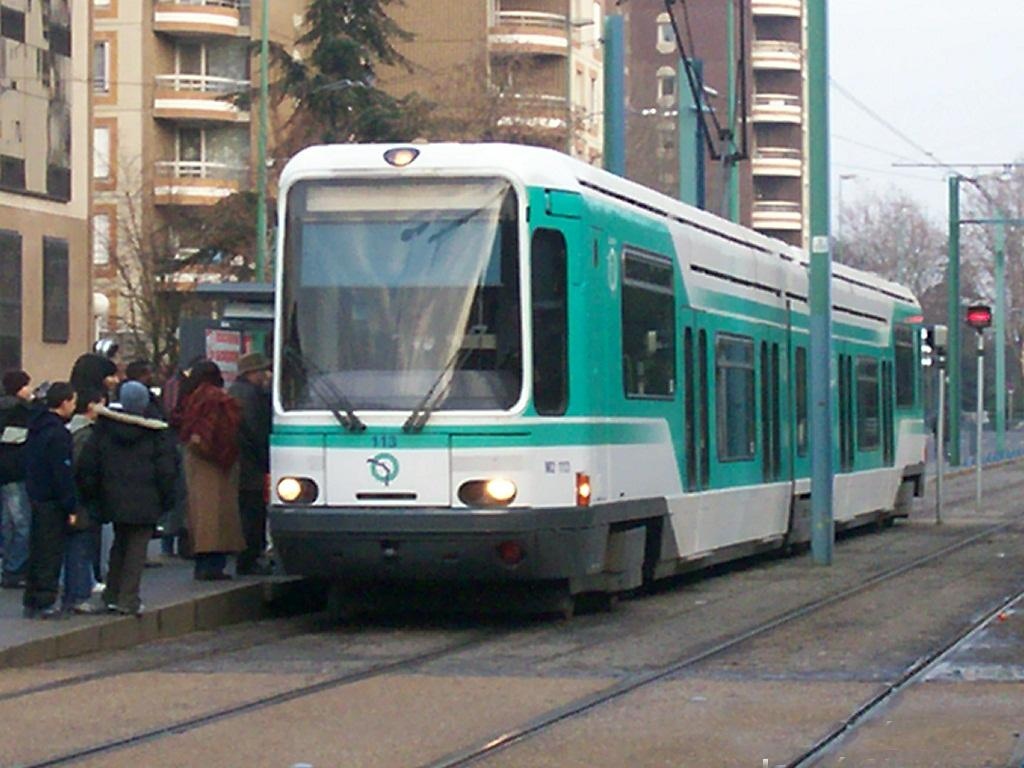
T1 tram at Bobigny–Pablo Picasso

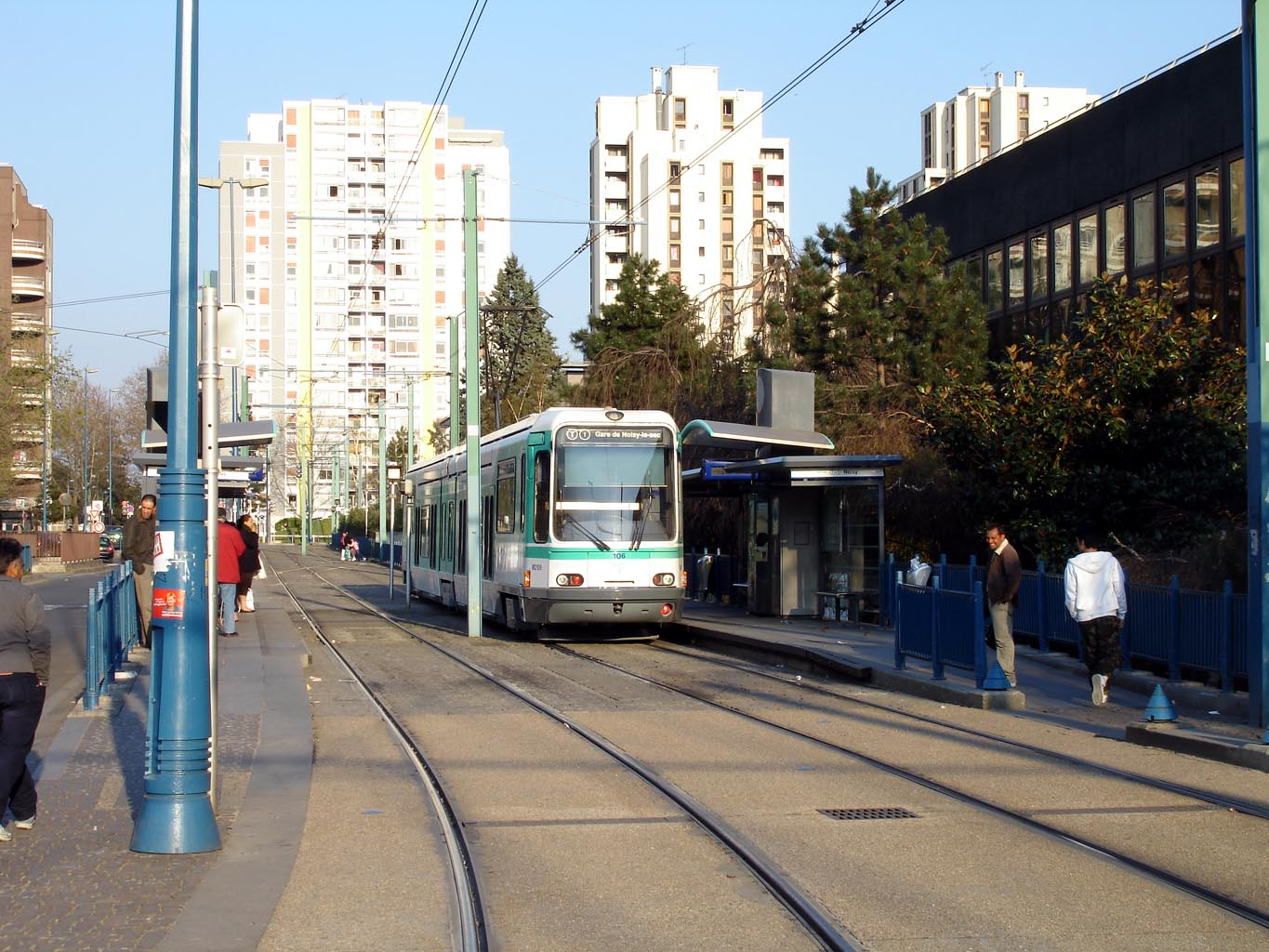
T1 tram at Bobigny–Pablo Picasso

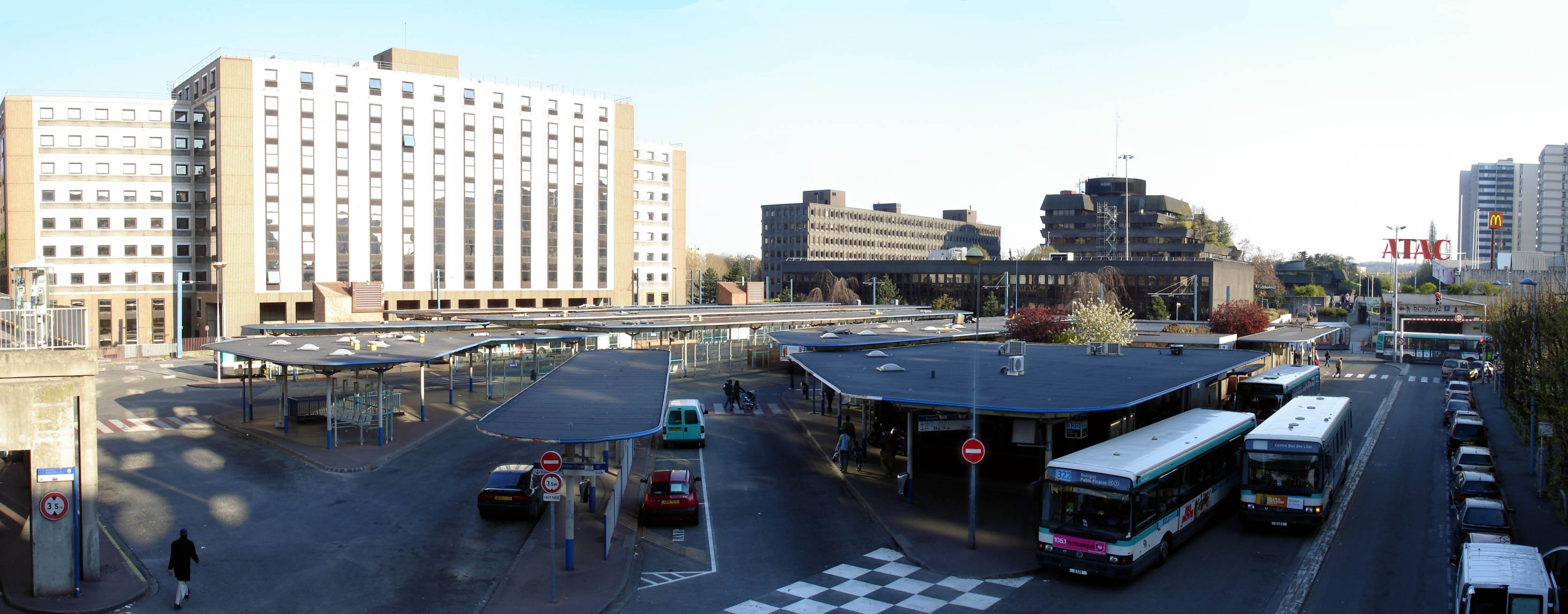
Bobigny bus station
