= T Zen =

Bus rapid transit network in Île-de-France

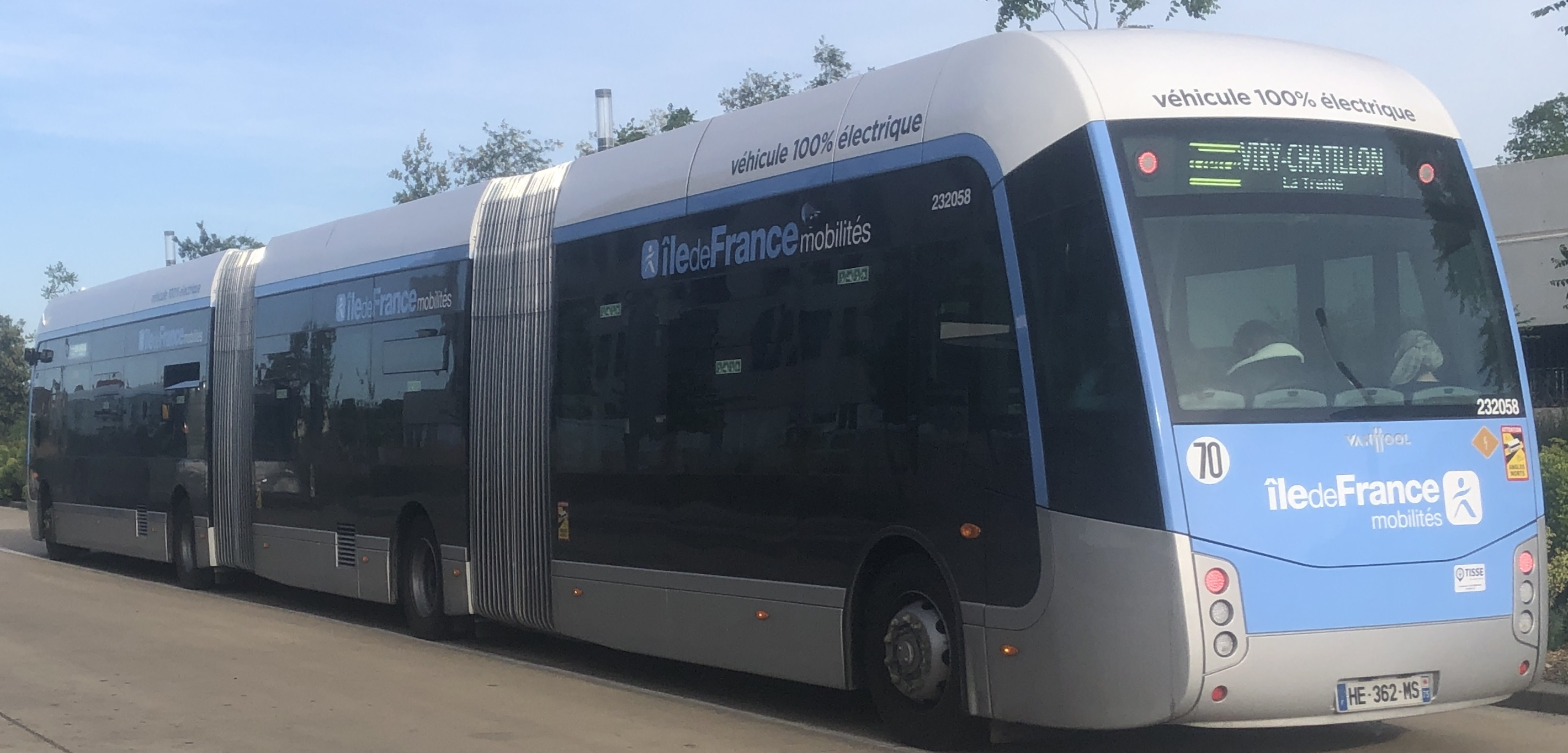
- A bi-articulated bus on T Zen Line 4.

Overview
- Locale: Île-de-France
- Transit type: Bus rapid transit
- Line number: Tzen 1, T Zen 4; 3 lines under construction: Tzen 2, T Zen 3, T Zen 5
- Number of stations: 14

Operation
- Operator(s): Transdev
- Number of vehicles: 12

Technical
- Average speed: 30 kilometres per hour (19 mph)

T Zen (stylised Tzen) is a bus rapid transit network managed by Île-de-France Mobilités and operating in the Île-de-France region.

== History ==
=== Overview ===
- 7 October 2009: The Syndicat des transports d'Île-de-France (STIF) plans the creation of a bus rapid transit service
- Autumn 2009: Works begin on the creation of T Zen Line 1, planned to run from Sénart to Corbeil-Essonnes
- 9 December 2009: An Iveco Bus Crealis Neo, is presented to journalists and elected officials, allowing them to see a what a potential T Zen bus could look like
- 22 September 2010: Jean-Paul Huchon, then-leader of STIF, presents the future lines of the network when he visits a Line 1 construction site:
  - T Zen 1 : Lieusaint - Moissy station (Sénart) – Corbeil-Essonnes
  - T Zen 2 : Carré Sénart – Melun
  - T Zen 3 : Porte de Pantin or Jules Ladoumègue – Livry-Gargan (via RN 3)
  - T Zen 4 : Corbeil-Essonnes – Évry-Courcouronnes – Grigny
  - T Zen 5 : Saclay – Massy
  - T Zen 6 : Garges-lès-Gonesse / Villiers-le-Bel – Villepinte
- 4 October 2010: The STIF approves the financing agreement for studies and consultation on constructing T Zen Lines 3 and 4
- 2 May to 11 June 2011: A public consultation is held about the construction of Line 3;
- 8 June 2011 : A presentation of the Tzen network is held. In comparison to the original announcement by Huchon, the project underwent some changes. The plans for the Garges-lès-Gonesse - Villepinte and Saclay - Massy routes were abandoned in exchange for a new route running from the 13th arrondissement of Paris at Bibliothèque nationale de France to Les Ardoines and Choisy-le-Roi. Other branches and sections were also studied to enhance the T Zen network, including branches recommended in an Île-de-France report known as the Plan de Mobilisation.
  - T Zen 1 : Lieusant - Moissy (Sénart) – Corbeil-Essonnes
  - T Zen 2 : Carré Sénart – Melun
  - T Zen 3 : Porte de Pantin ou Jules Ladoumègue – Livry-Gargan (via RN 3)
  - T Zen 4 : Corbeil-Essonnes – Évry-Courcouronnes – Grigny
  - T Zen 5 : Bibliothèque François-Mitterrand – Les Ardoines (Vitry-sur-Seine)
- 4 July 2011: Line 1 opens
- 6 July 2011: Confirmation that Line 5 will run to Choisy-le-Roi.

== Characteristics ==
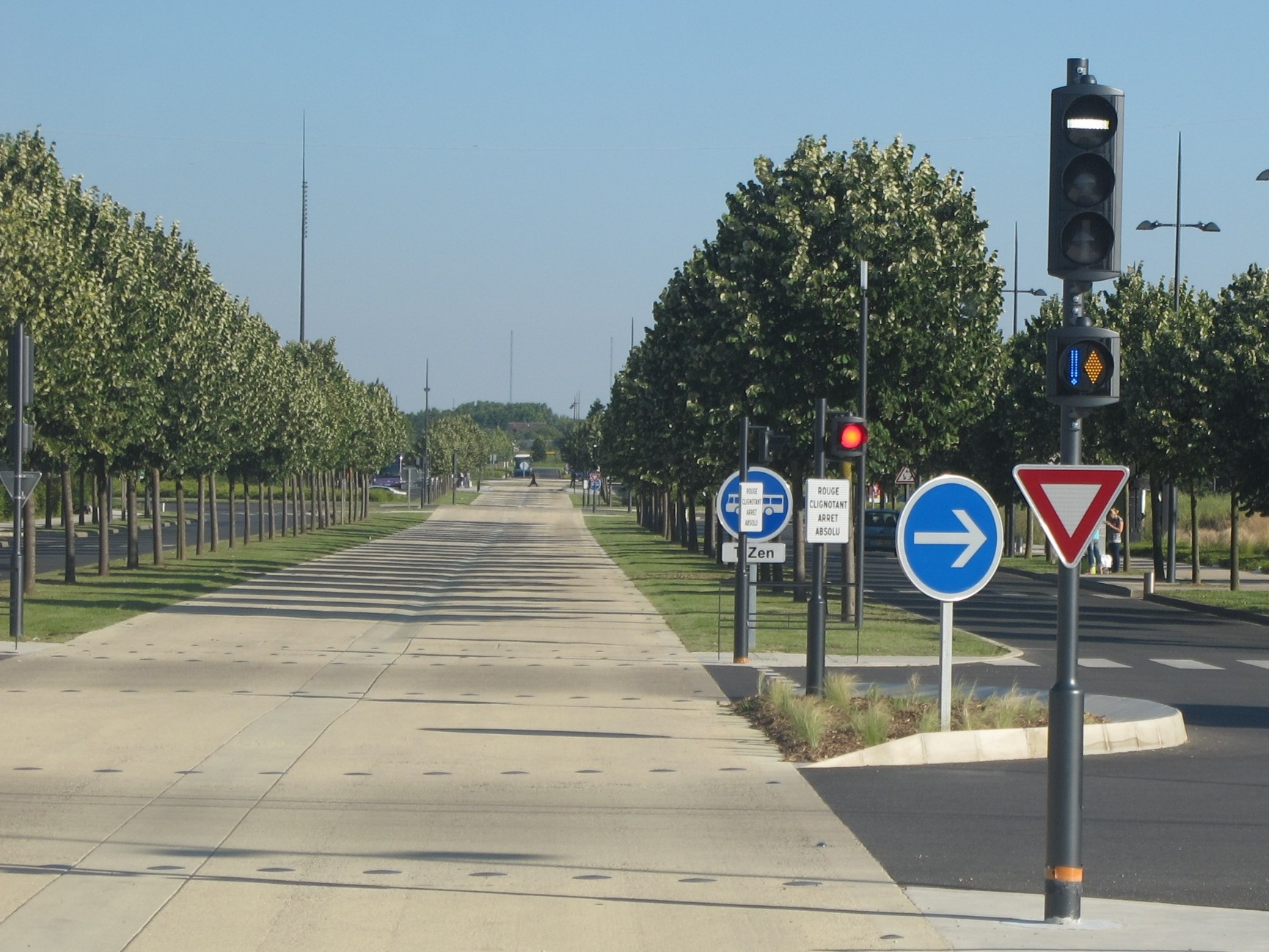
Line 1 near Carré Trait-d'Union station, showing the line's signalling system and segregated right-of-way

T Zen is a bus rapid transit network running on segregated rights-of-way, inspired by the Nantes Busway and the Cristalis bus routes in Lyon. It is similar to the RATP's Trans-Val-de-Marne. The line operators were chosen directly by Île-de-France Mobilités and sent offers.
