= Ourcq station =

Metro station in Paris, France

Ourcq
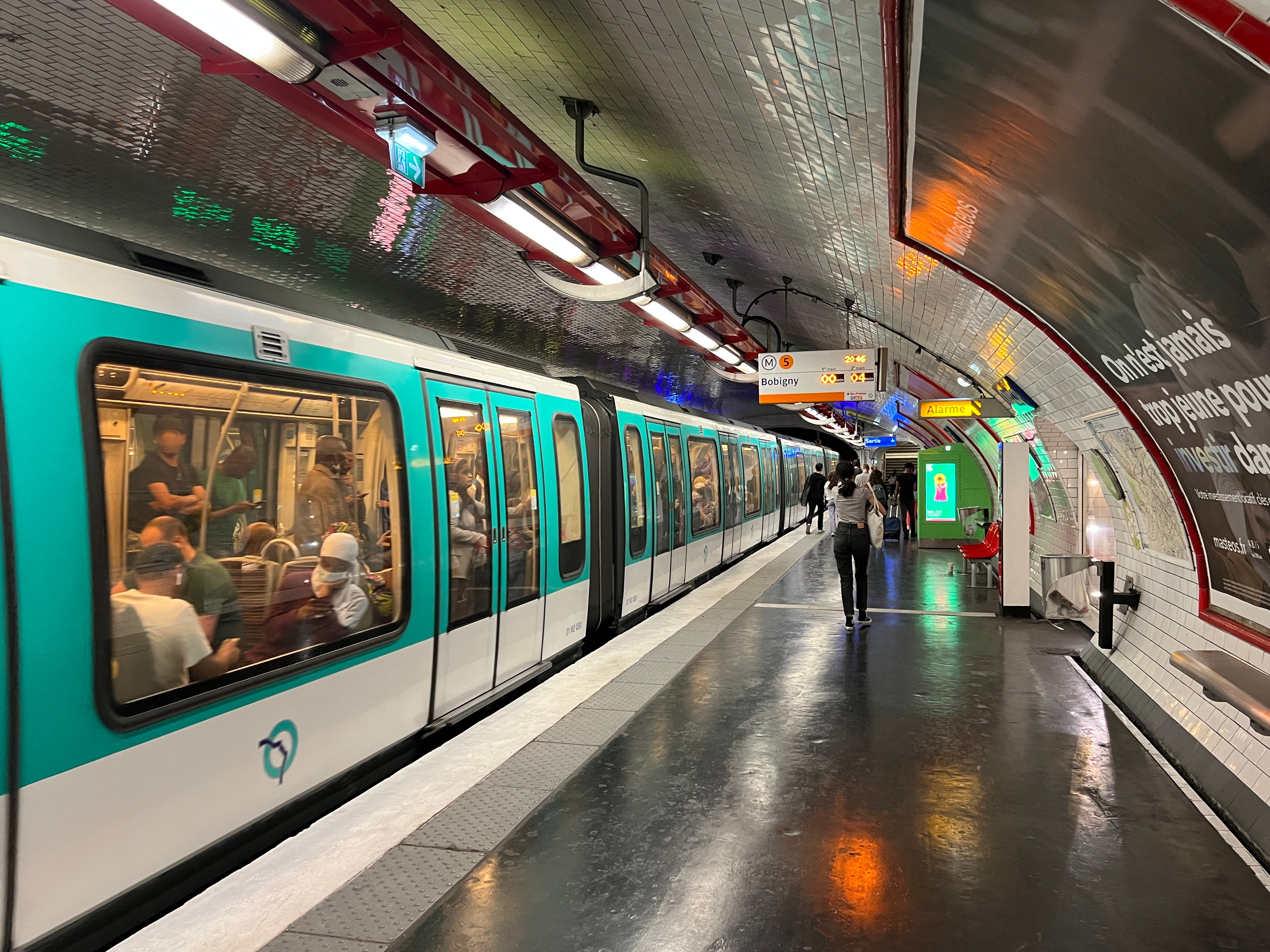
- MF 01 at Ourcq

General information
- Location: 148, av. Jean Jaurès; 159, av. Jean Jaurès; 161, av. Jean Jaurès; 19th arrondissement of Paris; Île-de-France; France
- Coordinates: 48°53′13″N 2°23′10″E
- Owner: RATP
- Operator: RATP
- Platforms: 2 (2 side platforms)
- Tracks: 2

Construction
- Accessible: No

Other information
- Station code: 22-02
- Fare zone: 1

History
- Opened: 21 March 1947

Passengers
- 2,862,337 (2021)

Services
| Preceding station | Paris Metro | Following station |
|---|---|---|
| Laumière towards Place d'Italie | Line 5 | Porte de Pantin towards Bobigny–Pablo Picasso |
Location
- Location within Paris

Ourcq (French pronunciation: [uʁk]) is a station in the 19th arrondissement of Paris, served by line 5 of the Paris Métro. It is named after the nearby rue de l'Ourcq, which in turn was named after the river Ourcq, a tributary of the Marne which rises in Aisne and flows into Île-de-France.

== History ==
The station opened on 21 March 1947, four years after the commissioning of the extension of line 5 from Gare du Nord to Eglise de Pantin. It was then located not far from Belleville-Villette station on the Chemin de fer de Petite Ceinture line, which closed in 1934. A bridge on which the line used to run can still be seen on Avenue Jean-Jaurès, around 200 m away from the station.

On 9 October 2019, alongside eleven other stations, some of the nameplates on the station's platforms were temporarily replaced by RATP to celebrate the 60th anniversary of the popular comic series Asterix and Obelix. It used the characteristic typography of the comic strips by René Goscinny and Albert Uderzo, its creators. It was humorously renamed "AbraracOurcqcix", a reference to one of the characters in the comics, Abraracourcix, the chief of the village where Asterix and Obelix belongs.

In 2019, the station was used by 3,763,663 passengers, making it the 131st busiest of the Métro network out of 302 stations.

In 2020, the station was used by 2,064,168 passengers amidst the COVID-19 pandemic, making it the 118th busiest of the Métro network out of 305 stations.

In 2021, the station was used by 2,862,337 passengers, making it the 116th busiest of the Métro network out of 305 stations.

== Passenger services ==
=== Access ===
The station has three entrances:

- Entrance 1: rue de Lunéville
- Entrance 2: rue de l'Ourcq
- Entrance 3: rue Adolphe Mille

=== Station layout ===
Street level
| B1 | Mezzanine |
| Platform level | Side platform, doors will open on the right |
| Platform level | Southbound | ← toward Place d'Italie (Laumière) |
| Platform level | Northbound | toward Bobigny–Pablo Picasso (Porte de Pantin) → |
| Platform level | Side platform, doors will open on the right |

=== Platform ===
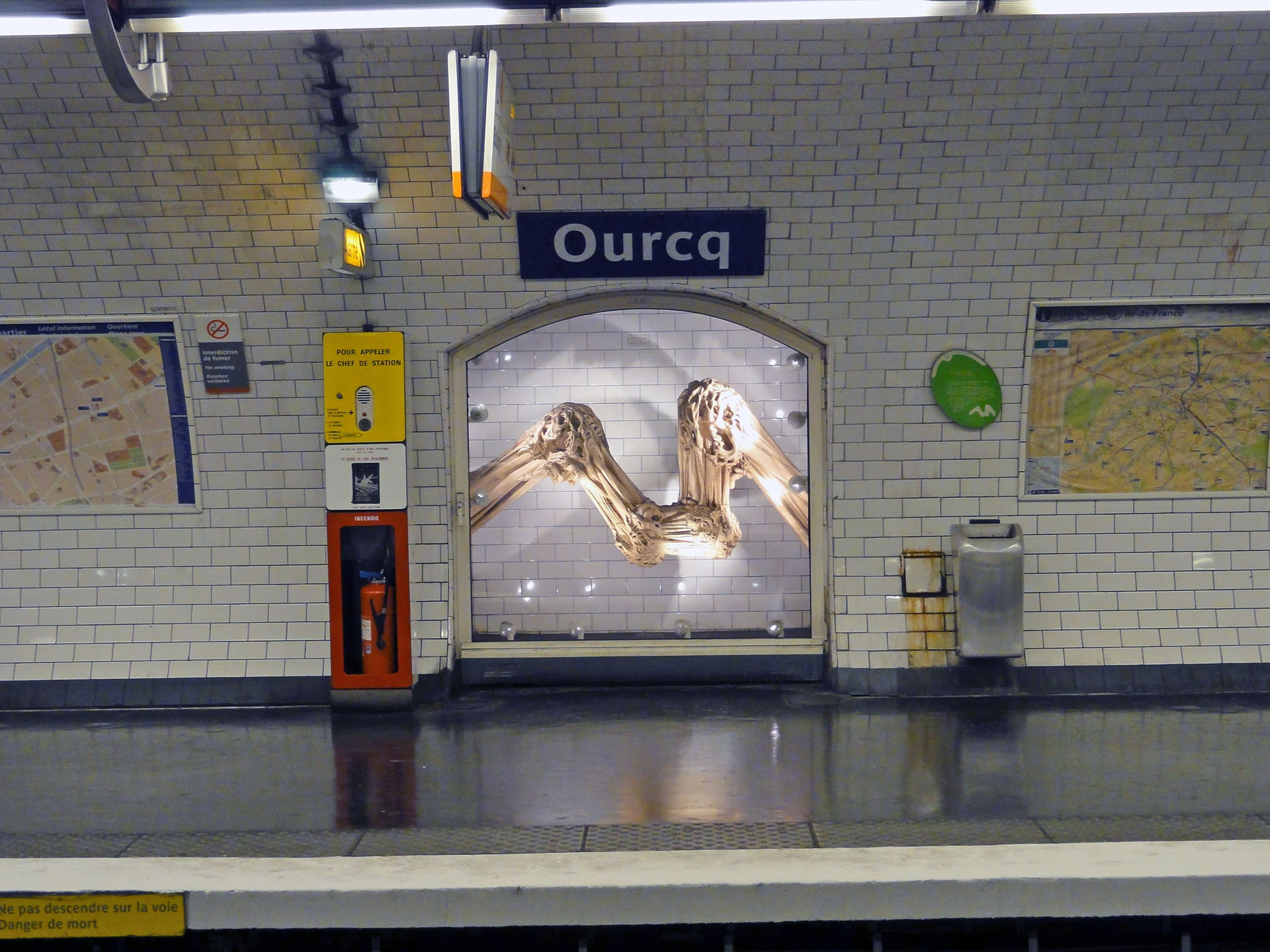
Sculpture on the platform

Ourcq has a standard platform configuration: it has two side platforms separated by metro tracks and an elliptical roof. It is decorated in the Ouï-dire style in red. The lighting strips are supported by curved shaped fake consoles. The direct lighting is white while the indirect lighting, projected on the vault, is multi-coloured. The white ceramic tiles are flat and cover the walls, the roof, and the outlets. The advertising frames are red and cylindrical, and the name of the station is written with the Parisine typeface on enamelled plates. The platforms are equipped with red Motte-style seats and grey "sit-lean" benches.

Since the late 1980s, the station features a Thierry Grave sculpture exhibit made of limewood in a niche on the walls of the platform towards Bobigny-Pablo Picasso. It represents the joint of a fabled animal.

=== Other connections ===
The station is also served by line 71 of the RATP Bus Network, and at night, by lines N13, N41, and N45 of the Noctilien network.

== Nearby ==
- Canal de l'Ourcq
- Cimetière de la Villette
- Darse du fond de Rouvray
- Pont levant de la rue de Crimée

== Gallery ==
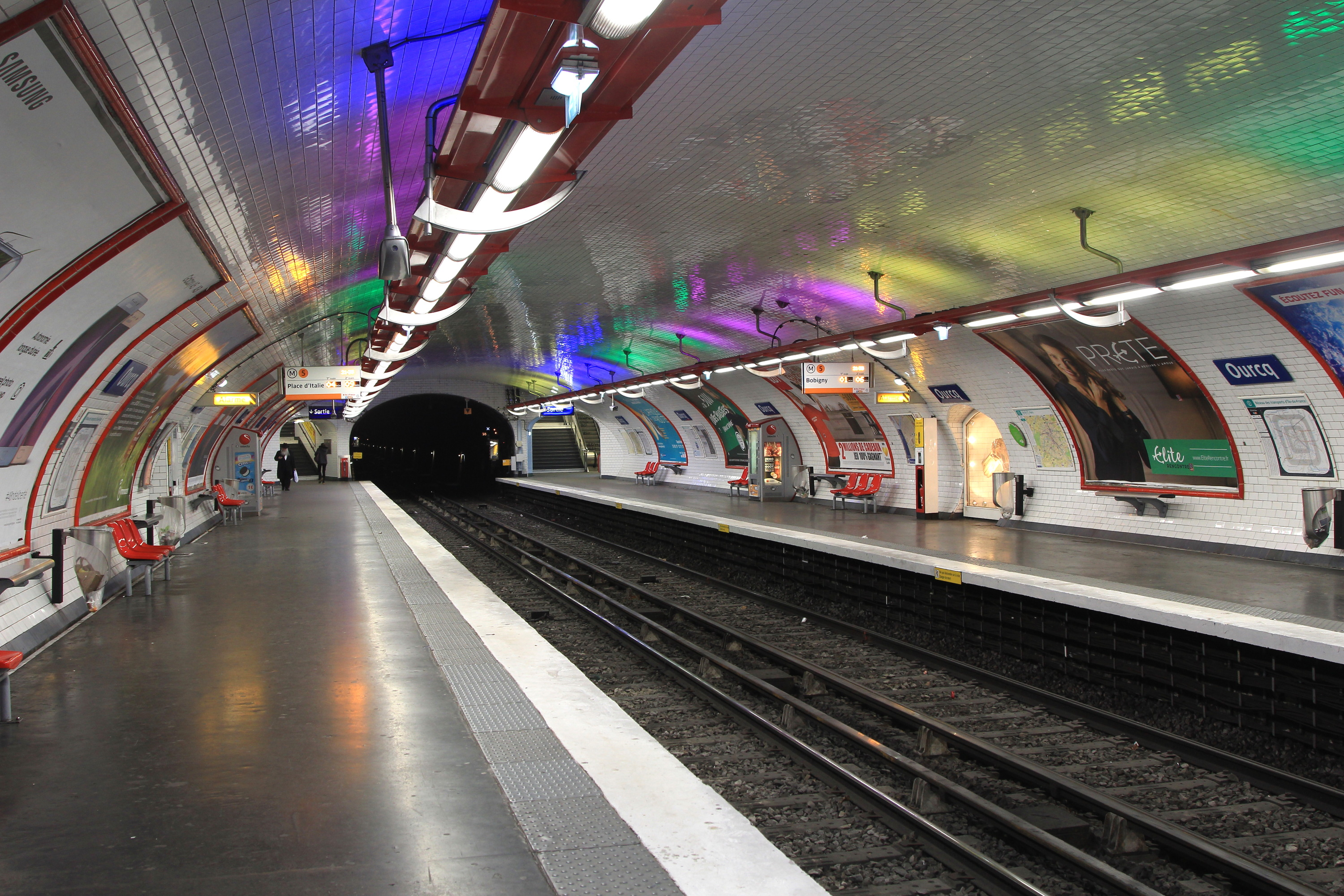
Platforms

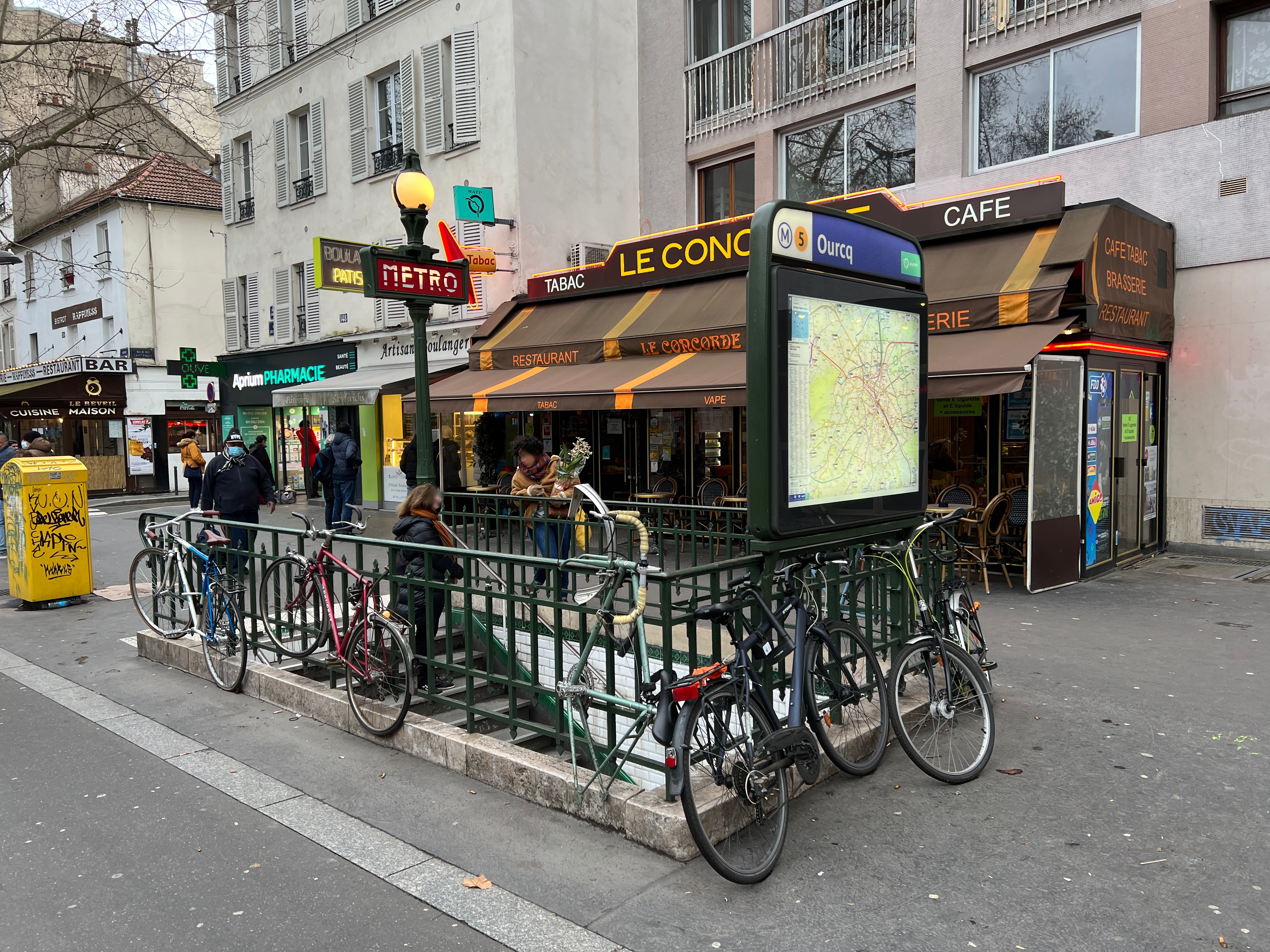
Access 1

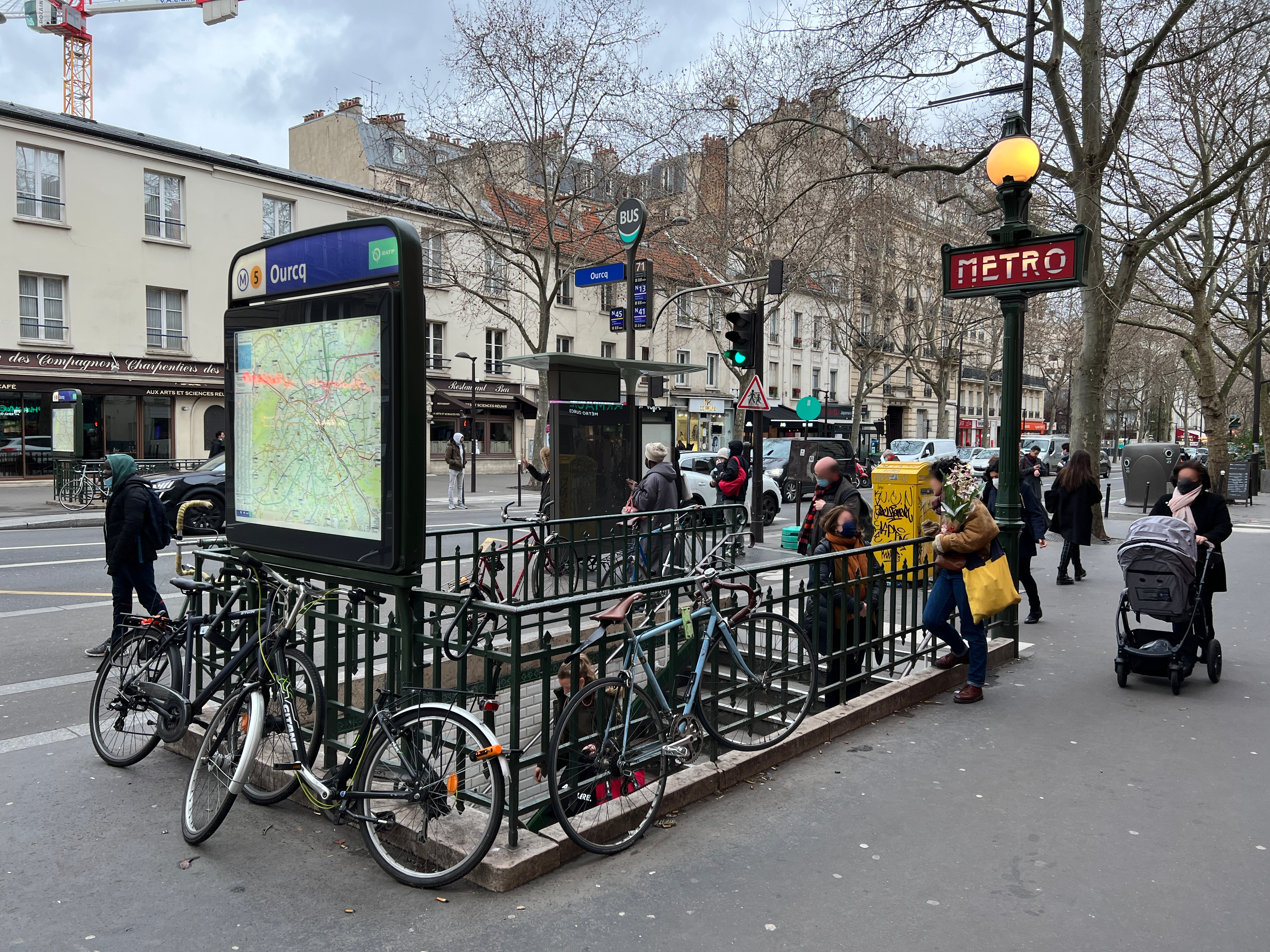
Access 2

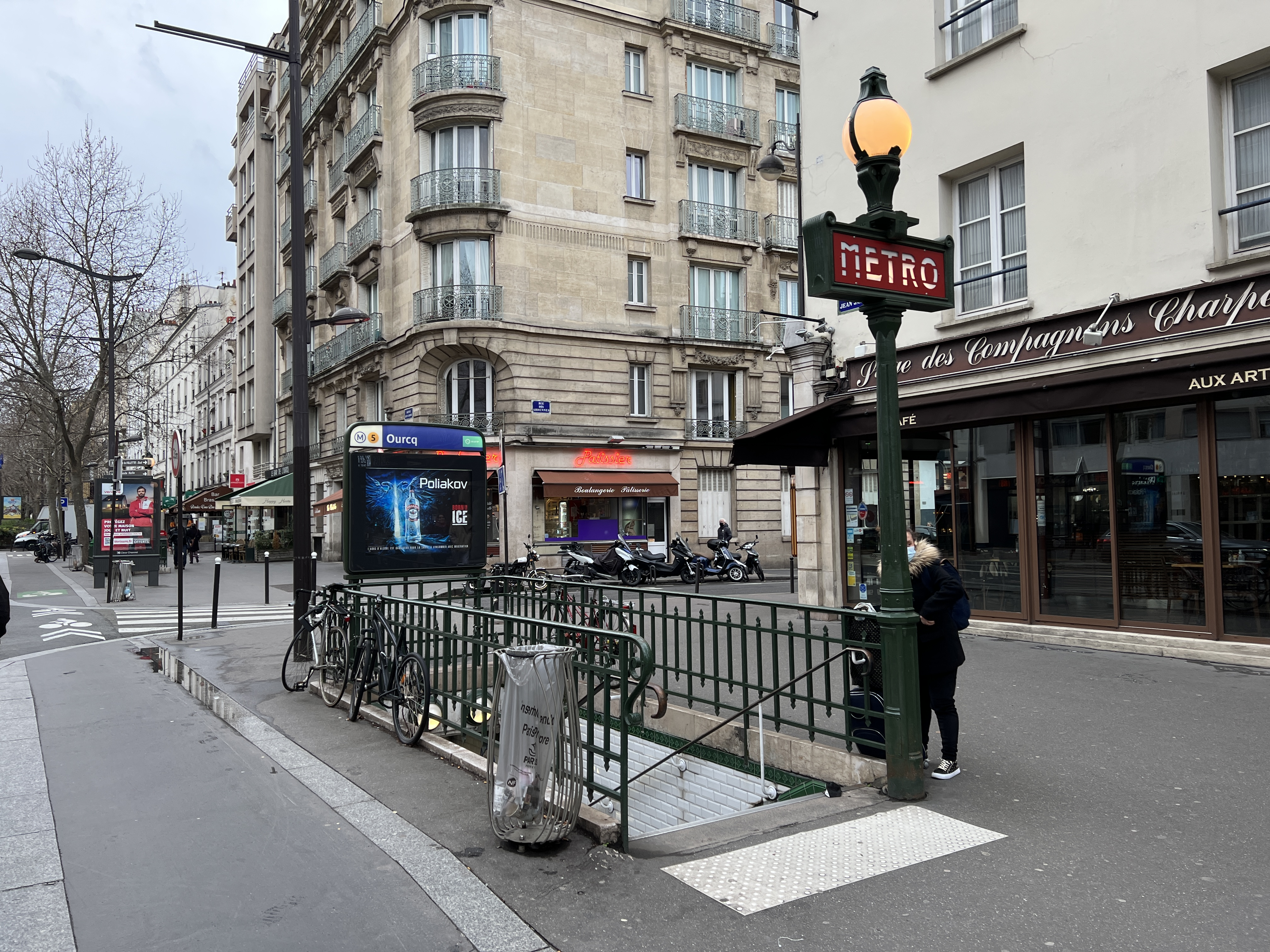
Access 3
