= Jacob Rodrigues Pereira =

Jewish Portuguese educator (1715–1780)

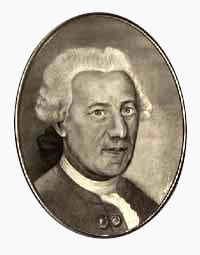
Jacob Rodrigues Pereira

Jacob Rodrigues Pereira or Jacob Rodrigue Péreire (April 11, 1715 – September 15, 1780) was a Portuguese Jewish educator and academic. He was the first teacher of deaf patients in France.

== Biography ==
Jacob Rodrigues Pereira was born in Peniche, Portugal, a descendant of a Portuguese Crypto-Jewish family from Chacim, Trás-os-Montes. His baptismal name was Francisco António Rodrigues, and his parents were João Lopes Dias and Leonor Rodrigues Pereira. In about 1741 he and his mother and siblings moved to Bordeaux and returned to Judaism; he adopted the name Jacob and his mother Abigail Rivka Rodrigues.

=== Deaf education ===
Pereira formulated signs for numbers and punctuation and adapted Juan Pablo Bonet's manual alphabet by adding 30 handshapes, each corresponding to a sound instead of to a letter. He is therefore seen as one of the inventors of manual language for the deaf, though he did not invent it in its entirety. The manual alphabet has roots dating back to medieval Catholic monasteries, though Pereira did adapt the Spanish manual alphabet published (though plagiarized) by Juan Pablo Bonet to better fit the French language.

He is sometimes miscredited with being the first person to teach a non-verbal deaf person to speak, when in fact, Pedro Ponce de León is more reliably credited as the first back in the sixteenth century. Pereira claimed to have taught a deaf student, though he had actually been instructed by deaf monk, Étienne de Fay. He exhibited his "accomplished" students (ones who had partial hearing, but concealed this fact) in demonstrations.

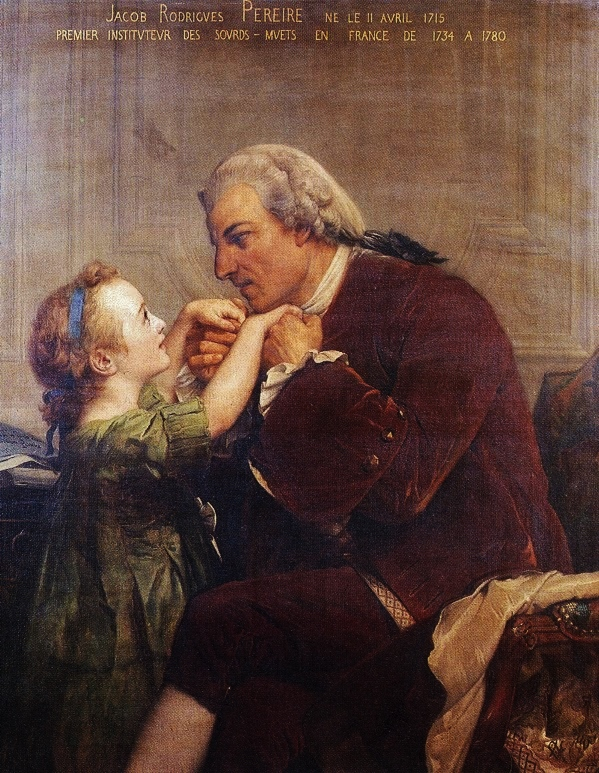
Rodrigues Pereira with patient

In 1759, he was made a member of the Royal Society of London.

A lifelong devotee to the well-being of the Jews of southern France, Portugal, and Spain, beginning in 1749 he was a volunteer agent for the Portuguese Jews in Paris. In 1777, his efforts led to Jews from Portugal receiving the right to settle in France.

In 1772, he published a Tahitian vocabulary for Louis-Antoine de Bougainville's Voyage, after learning the language from Ahutoru, the first Tahitian to sail aboard a European vessel.

In 1876 Pereira's remains were transferred from the Cimetière de la Villette (where he had been buried the year in which that cemetery was opened) to that of the Cimetière de Montmartre.

In Bordeaux the street "Rodrigues-Pereire" was named in his honor.

His grandsons, the Péreire brothers, Émile Péreire (1800–1875) and Isaac Péreire (1806–1880), were well-known French financiers and bankers during the second empire who encouraged the construction of the first railway in France in 1835. In 1852, they founded the Société Générale du Crédit Mobilier.
