= Rue Adolphe Mille, Paris =

Street in Paris, France

Rue Adolphe Mille
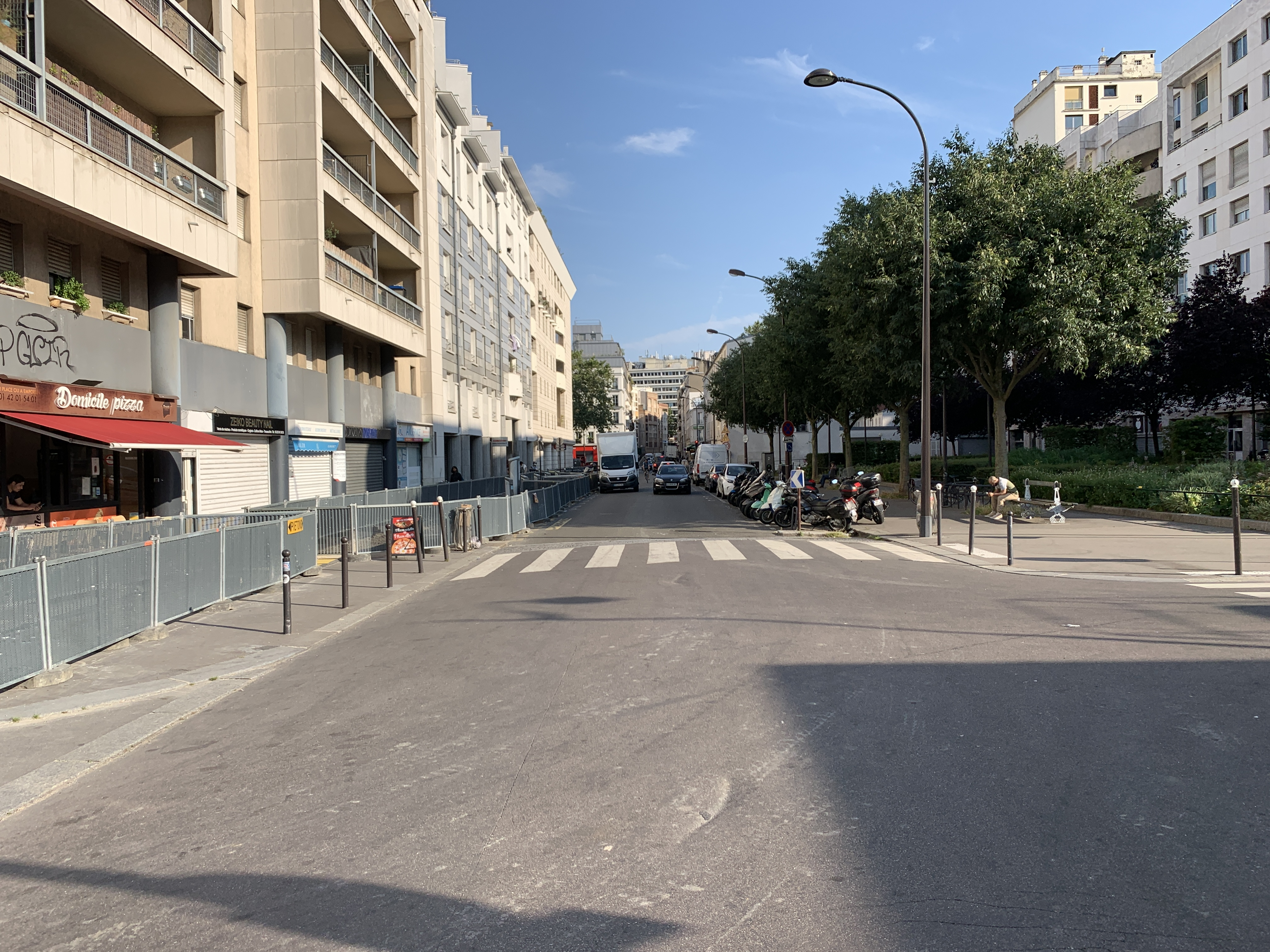
- The road in 2021

- Location within Paris
- Length: 176 m (577 ft)
- Width: 15.50 m (50.9 ft)
- Arrondissement: 19th
- Quarter: Pont de Flandre
- Coordinates: 48°53′19″N 2°23′19″E
- From: Avenue Jean Jaurès
- To: Rue Delesseux

Construction
- Denomination: April 5, 1904

The Rue Adolphe Mille is a street in the 19th arrondissement of Paris, near the Parc de la Villette, the Conservatoire de Musique et de Danse and the Cité de la Musique.

== History ==
In the 19th century, slaughterhouses were located in the commune of La Villette, which included a dump and reprocessing site for animal waste.

The Rue Adolphe Mille was constructed and named around 1904. It was a replacement for the Impasse de Dépotoir ("Dead end of the Dump") and the Rue du Dépotoir, a right-of-way between a former plaster pit-mine and a garbage dump, and a former stream drained after the construction the Ourcq Canal.

The street was named for Adolphe Auguste Mille (1812–1894), general inspector of the Department of Bridges and Streets, civil engineer for the city of Paris, and founder of the city dump. He was also an activist for the re-use of Paris' sewage for local agriculture.

The Rue Adolphe Mille is a short street in the 19th arrondissement of Paris, running from the Rue de la Delesseux with its termination at the Avenue Jean-Jaures, with a total length of about 178 meters.

== Transportation ==
The nearest stations of the Paris Métro are Ourcq and Porte de Pantin, on Line 5.
