= Porte de Pantin station =

Metro station in Paris, France

Porte de Pantin Parc de la Villette
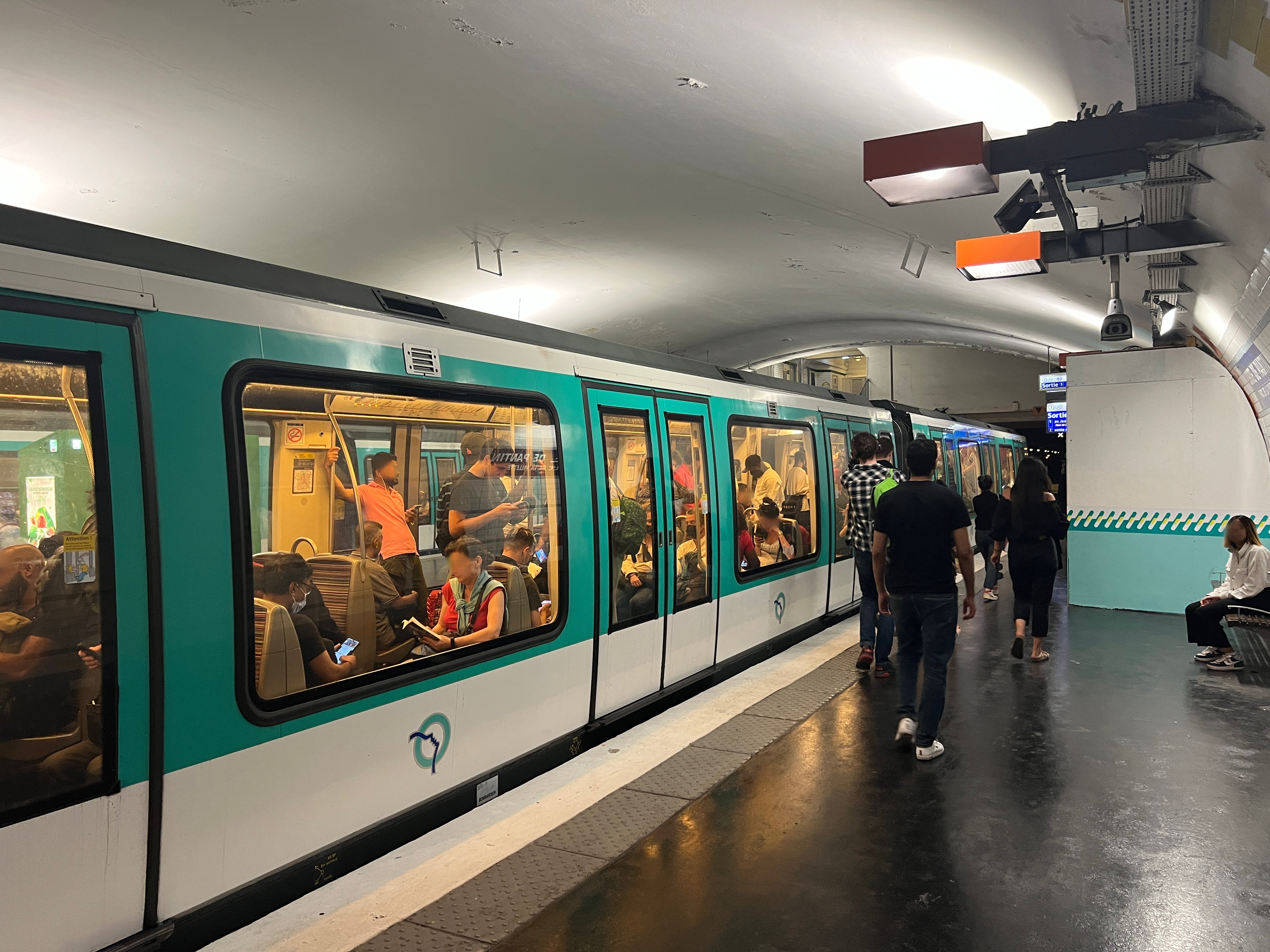
- MF 01 at Porte de Pantin

General information
- Other names: Parc de la Villette
- Location: Av. Jean Jaurès × rue Adolphe Mille; 194, av. Jean Jaurès; 212, av. Jean Jaurès; Parc de la Villette; 19th arrondissement of Paris; Île-de-France; France
- Coordinates: 48°53′23″N 2°23′47″E
- Owner: RATP
- Operator: RATP
- Line: Paris Metro Paris Metro Line 5
- Platforms: 2 (1 island platform, 1 side platform)
- Tracks: 3

Other information
- Station code: 2201
- Fare zone: 1

History
- Opened: 12 October 1942

Passengers
- 3,374,733 (2021)

Services
Preceding station	Paris Metro	Following station
Ourcq towards Place d'Italie	Line 5	Hoche towards Bobigny–Pablo Picasso
Location
- Location within Paris

Porte de Pantin (Parc de la Villette) (French pronunciation: [pɔʁt də pɑ̃tɛ̃ paʁk də la vilɛt]) is a station of the Paris Métro, serving line 5. It is named after the nearby avenue de la Porte de Pantin, on the edge of Paris leading to the town of Pantin. It was in turn named after the nearby Porte de Pantin, one of the former gates of Paris. The station's name has been subtitled Parc de la Villette since the creation of the eponymous park in 1987 on the site of the former slaughterhouses of La Villette to the north of the station which closed in 1974.

== History ==
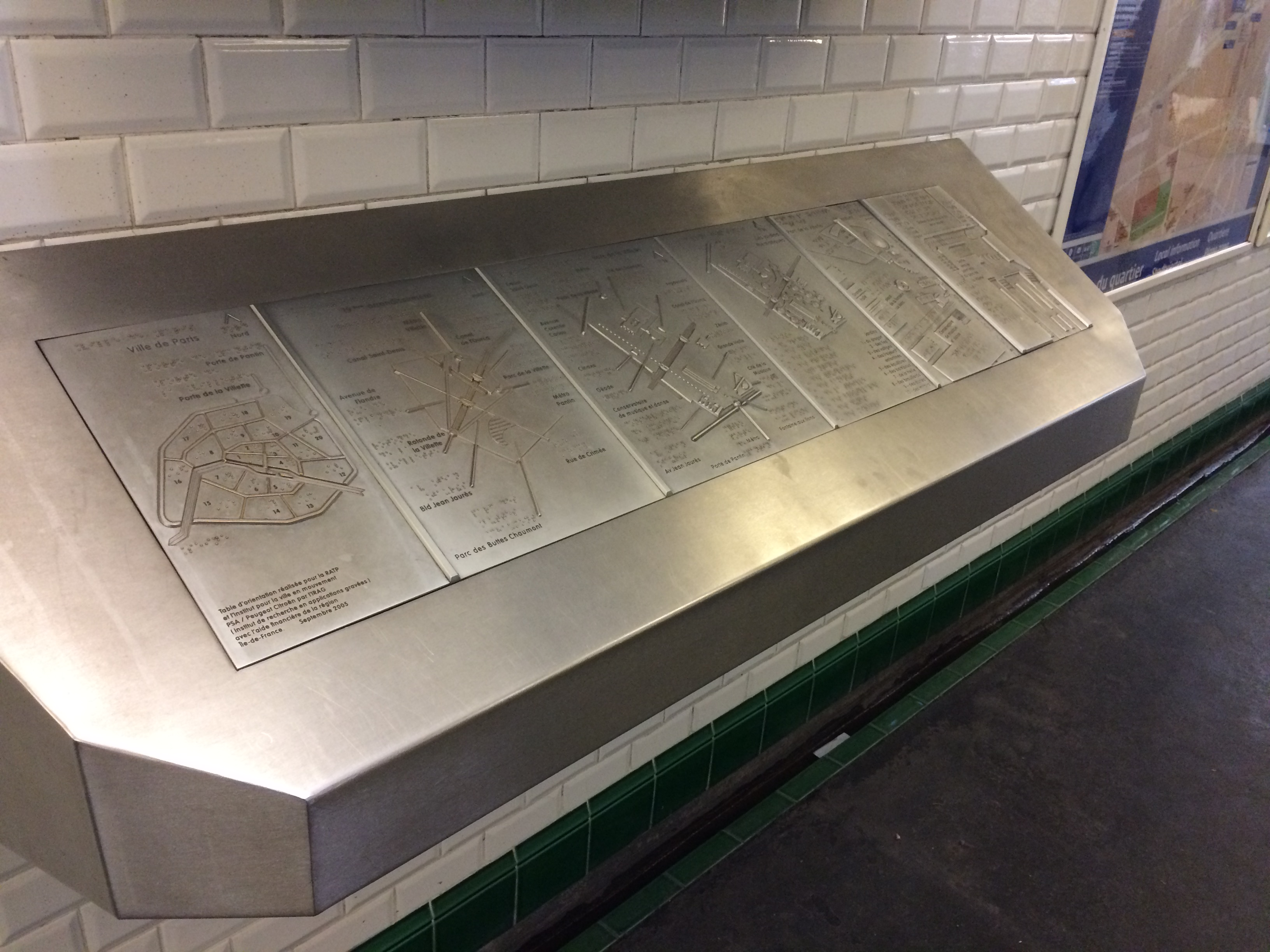
Relief table at the station

The station opened on 12 October 1942 when the line was extended from Gare du Nord to Église de Pantin.

As part of the "Renouveau du métro" programme by the RATP, the station was renovated and modernised on 4 September 2003.

In September 2005, in partnership with the RATP and STIF, the Institut pour la ville en mouvement (IVM) installed relief tables at the station as well as at Porte de la Villette on line 7 and Basilique de Saint-Denis on line 13. They are relief maps of the neighbourhood surrounding the station. It is intended to help the blind and those who are visually imparied have tactile information at the exits of the stations on the surroundings as well as nearby cultural sites.

In 2024, it will be served by line 3 of the T Zen network, a bus rapid transit system, serving as its western terminus. It was originally slated to open in 2018, then postponed to the end of 2022, then again to 2024.

In 2019, the station was used by 5,615,256 passengers, making it the 69th busiest of the Métro network out of 302 stations.

In 2020, the station was used by 2,336,476 passengers amidst the COVID-19 pandemic, making it the 97th busiest of the Métro network out of 305 stations.

In 2021, the station was used by 3,374,733 passengers, making it the 89th busiest of the Métro network out of 305 stations.

== Passenger services ==
=== Access ===
The station has four accesses:

- Access 1: avenue Jean Jaurès Parc de la Villette (with a lift)
- Access 2: sente des Dorées (with an ascending escalator)
- Access 3: rue Adolphe Mille
- Access 4: rue Eugène Jumin

=== Station layout ===
Street Level
B1	Mezzanine
Line 5 platforms	Southbound	← toward Place d'Italie (Ourcq)
Line 5 platforms	Island platform, doors will open on the left
Line 5 platforms	Center track	No regular service
Line 5 platforms	Northbound	toward Bobigny – Pablo Picasso (Hoche) →
Line 5 platforms	Side platform, doors will open on the right

=== Platforms ===
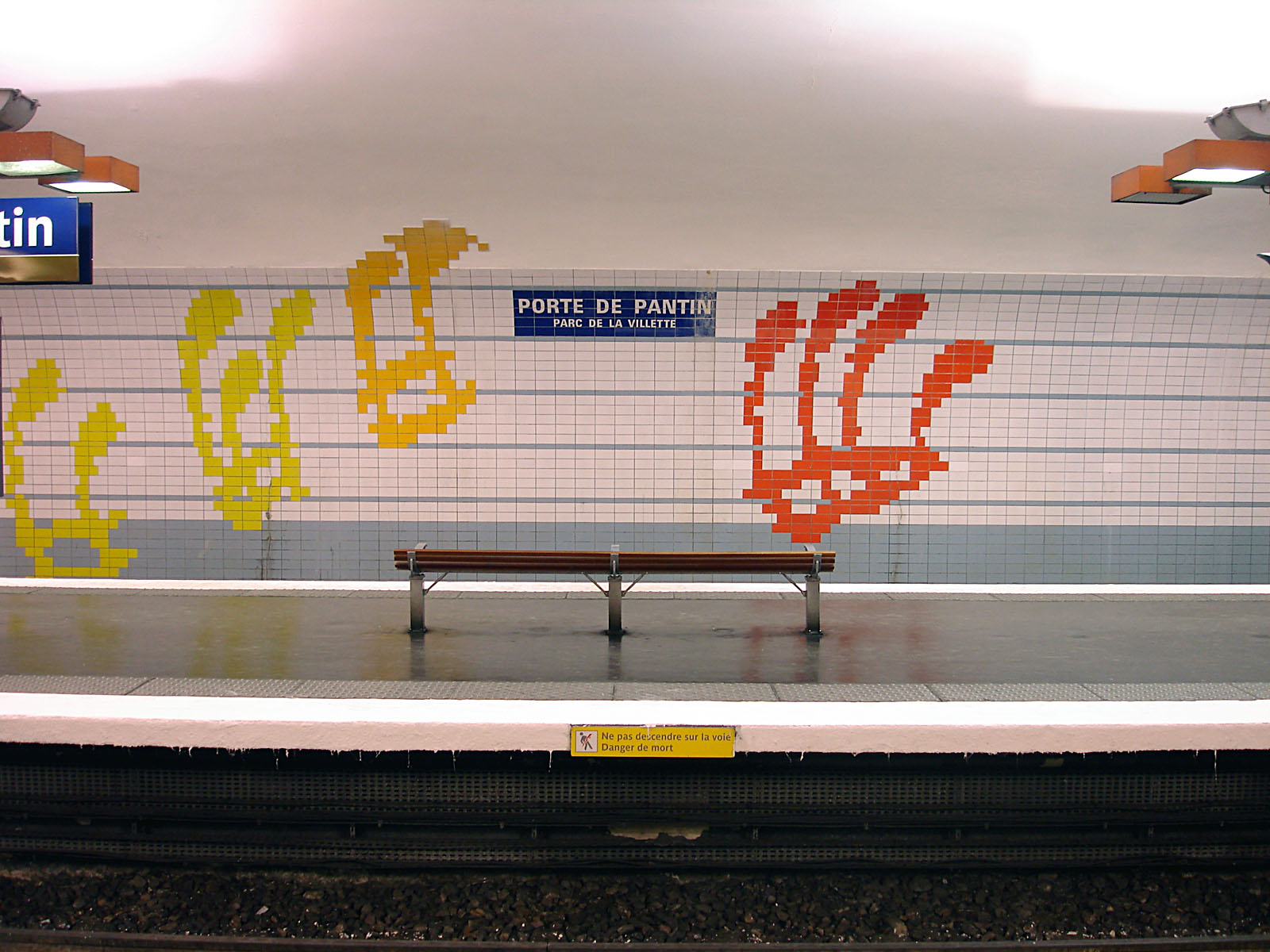
Decoration on the platform walls

The station has three tracks and two platforms, with the centre track not being used in revenue service. Along with Porte de Bagnolet on line 3, Porte d'Italie on line 7, and Porte Dorée on line 8, it is one of the four stations on the network built at the former gates of Paris without having originally served as its terminus, although it has a platform configuration with three tracks with the centre track leading to a siding. This enables it to serve as an intermediate terminus for trains on short-working trips to turn back towards Place d'Italie.

After the opening of the Cité de la Musique in 1995, the platforms were renovated with a theme of music. The elliptical vault was painted white, while the walls were covered with white tiles with five grey horizontal lines of tiles, serving as the music staff. It was decorated with red, blue, green, orange, and yellow tiles forming musical notes, mimicking a music score.

The name of the station is written in faience on the abutments of the station and with the Parisine font on enamelled plates on the island platform.

=== Other connections ===
The station is also served by tramway 3b since 15 December 2012 along with lines 75 and 151 of the RATP Bus Network, and at night, by lines N13, N41, and N45 of the Noctilien network.

== Nearby ==
- Cité de la Musique
- Conservatoire de Paris
- Église Sainte-Claire de Paris
- Fontaine aux Lions de Nubie
- Grande halle de la Villette
- Le Trabendo
- Le Zénith
- Parc de la Villette
- Porte de Pantin, one of the former gates of Paris

== Gallery ==
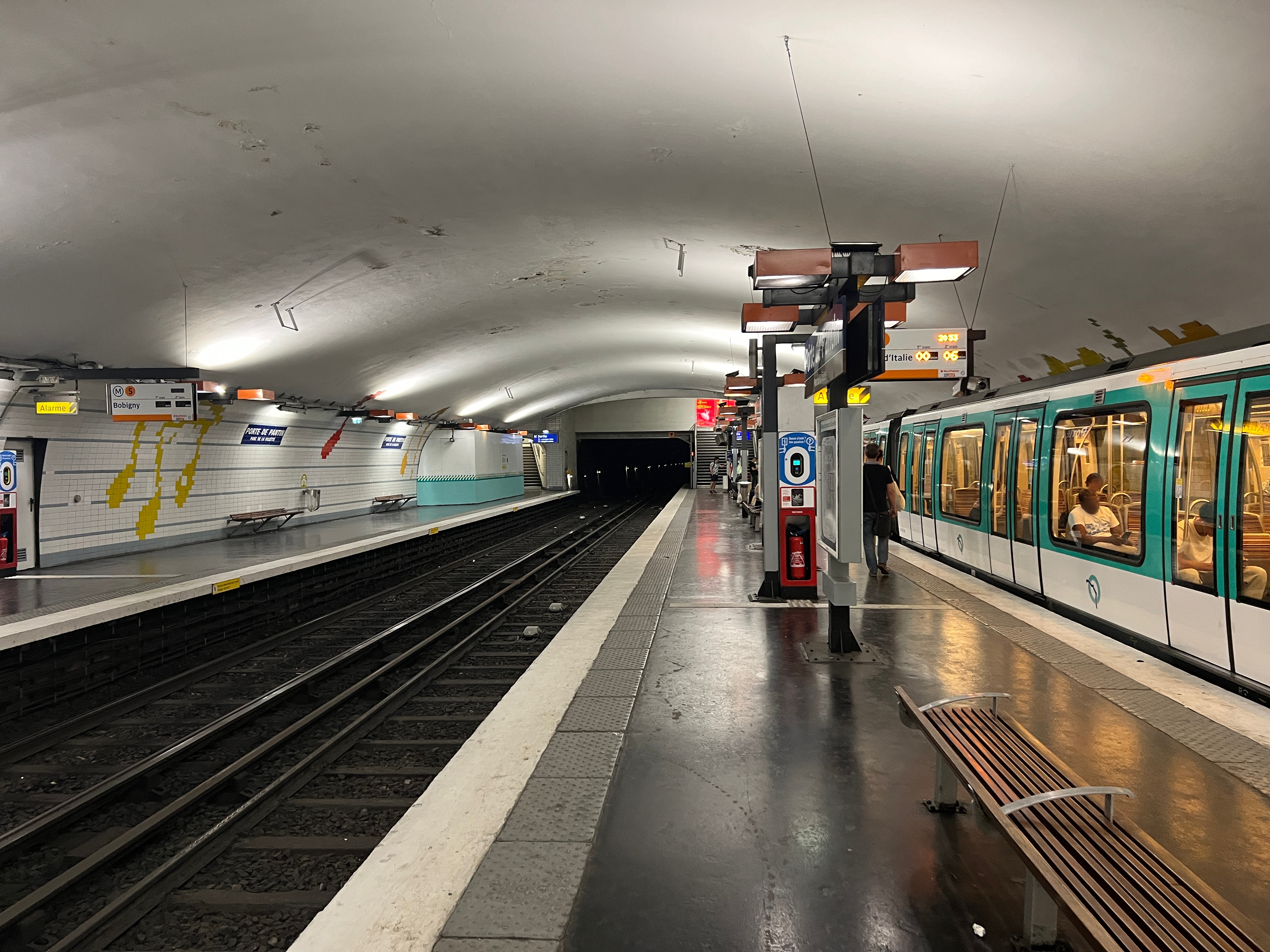
Platforms

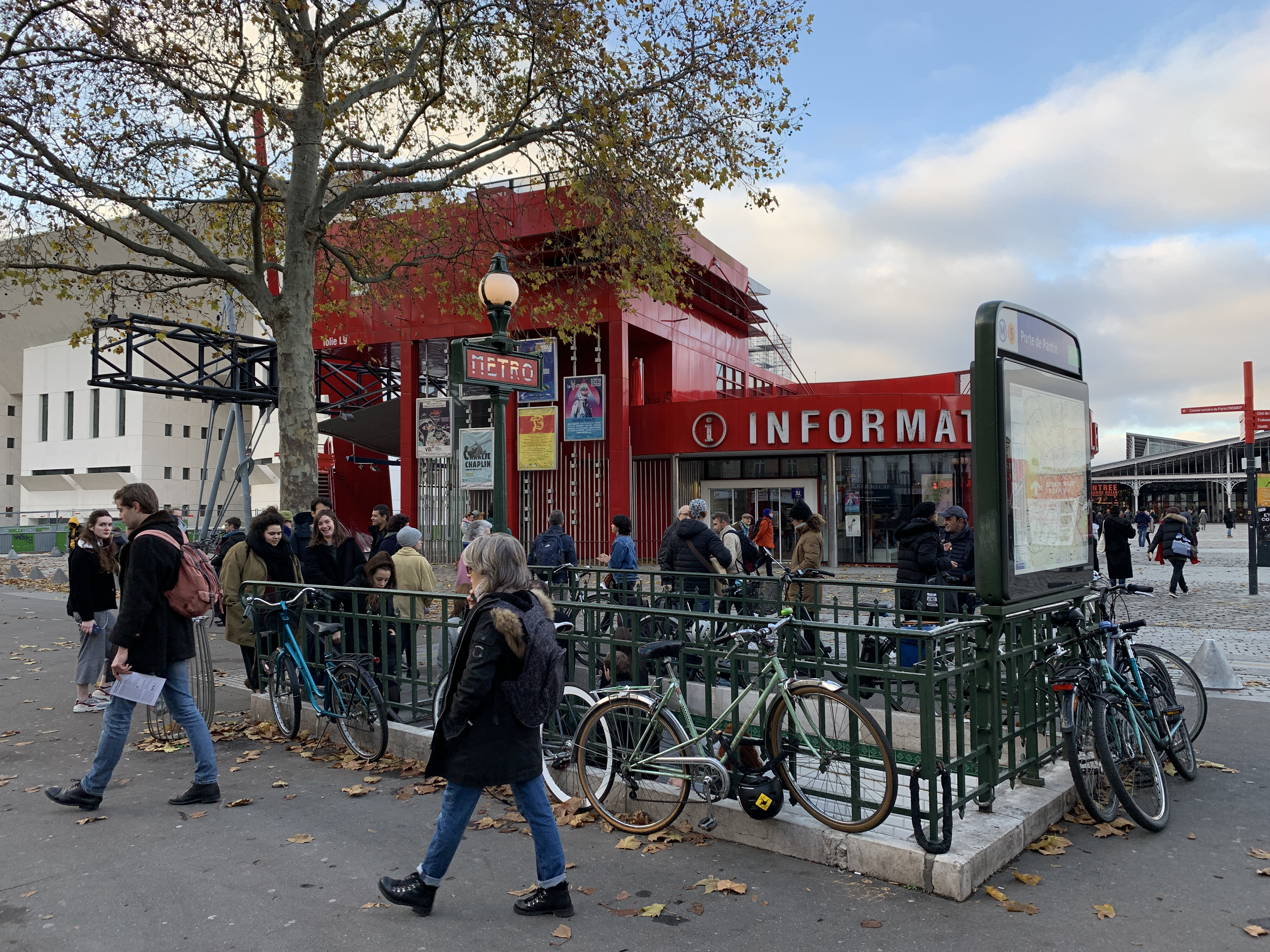
Access 1

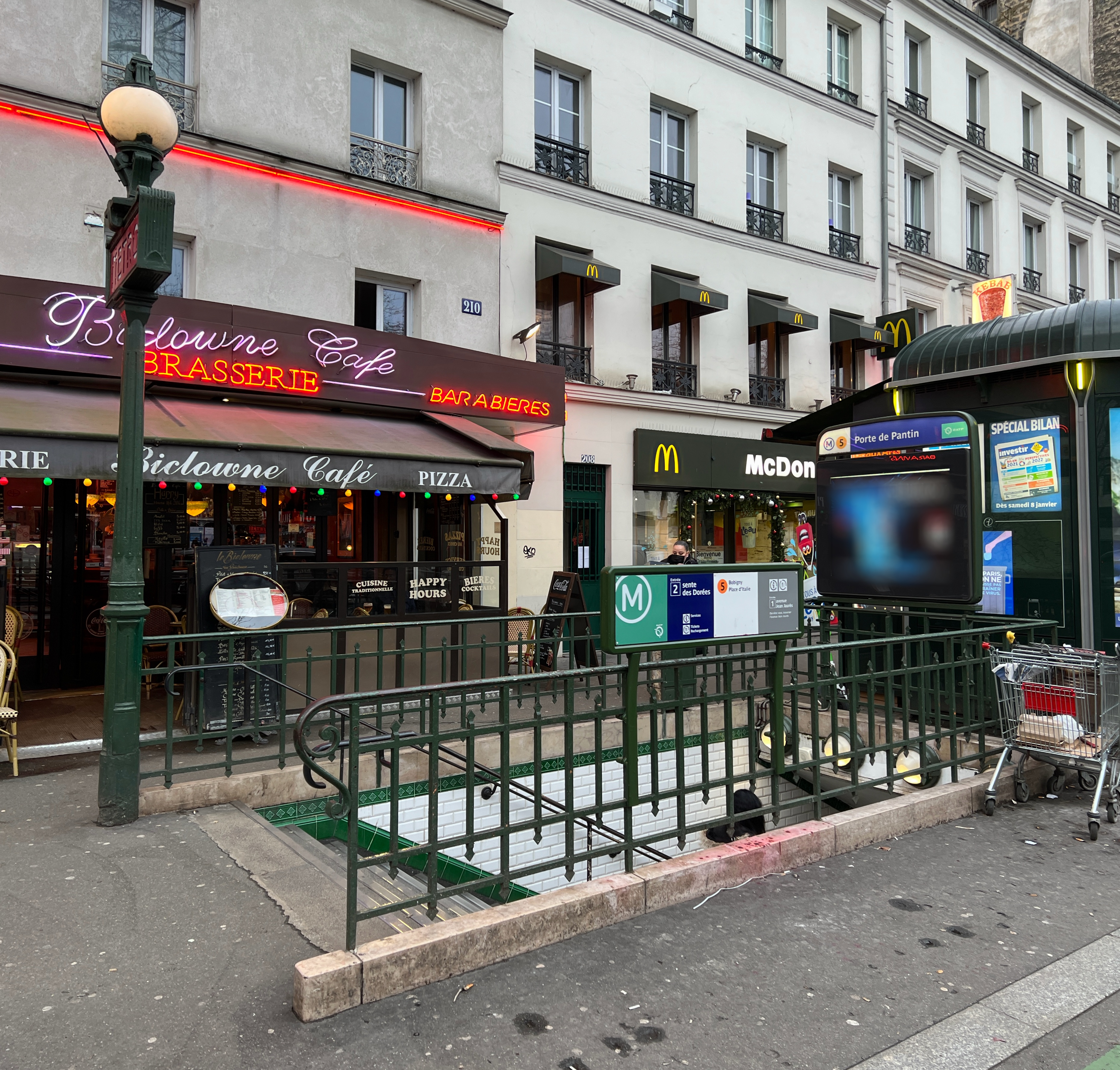
Access 2

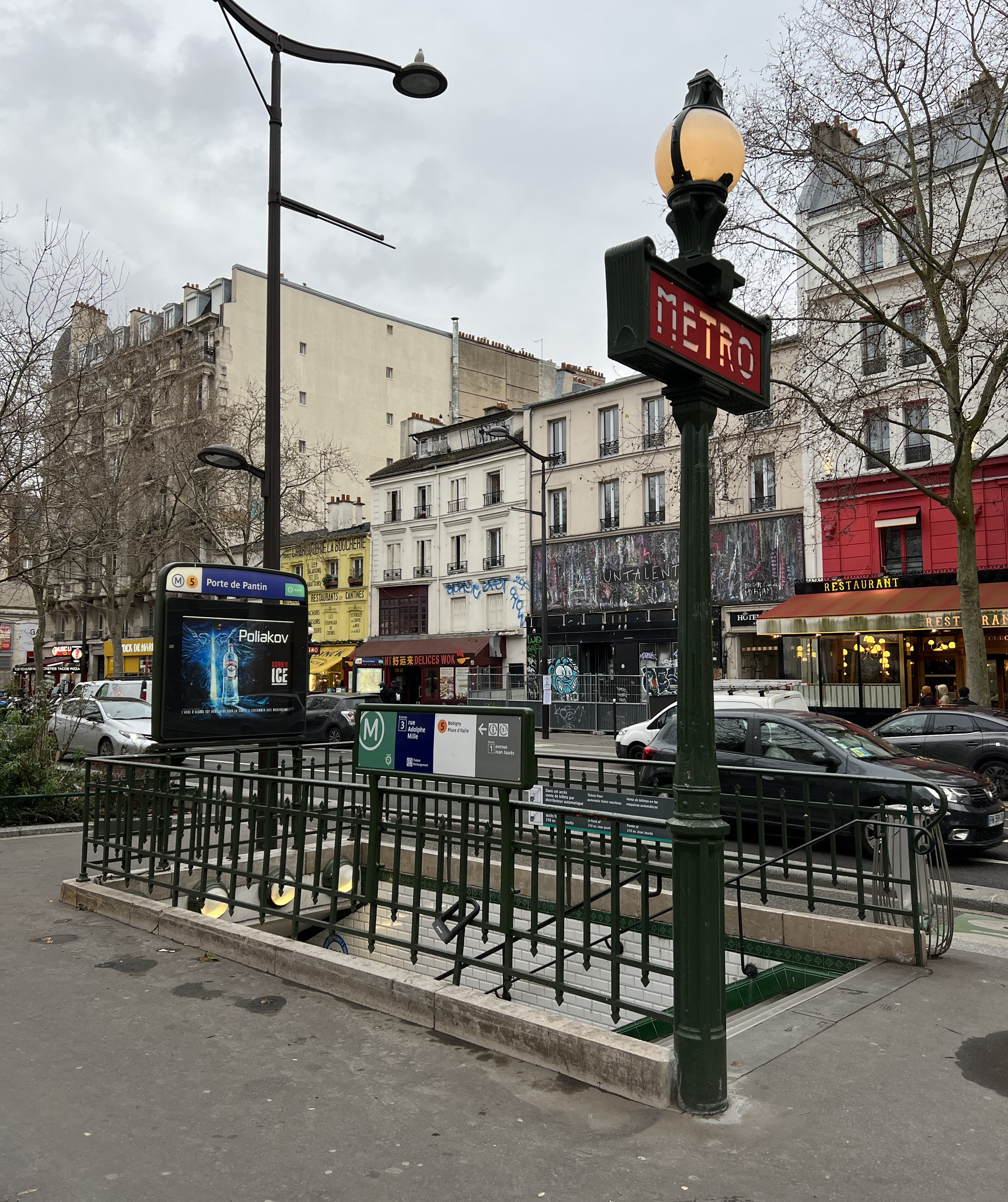
Access 3

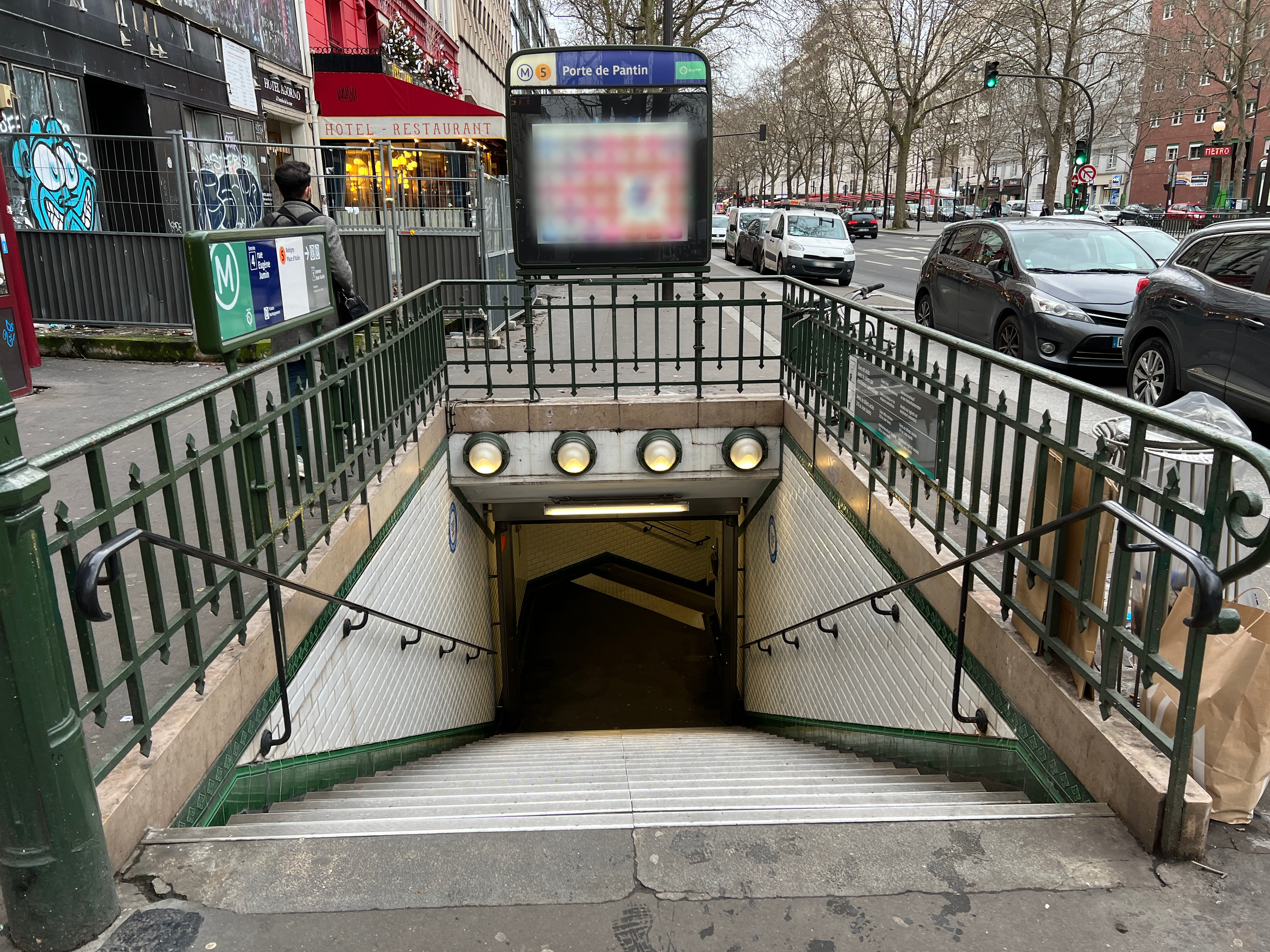
Access 4

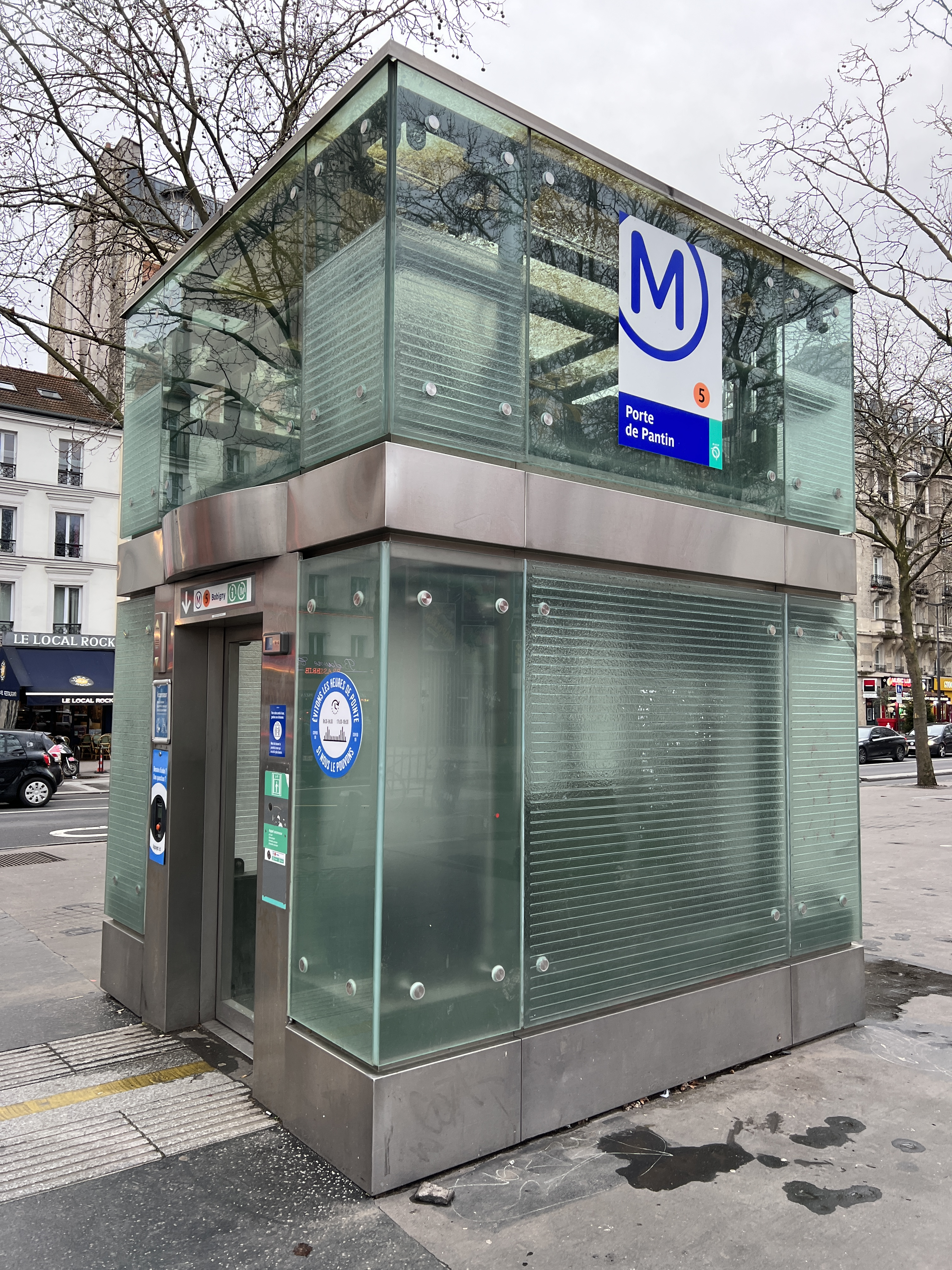
Lift at access 1
