= Ahutoru =

First Pacific Islander to visit Europe

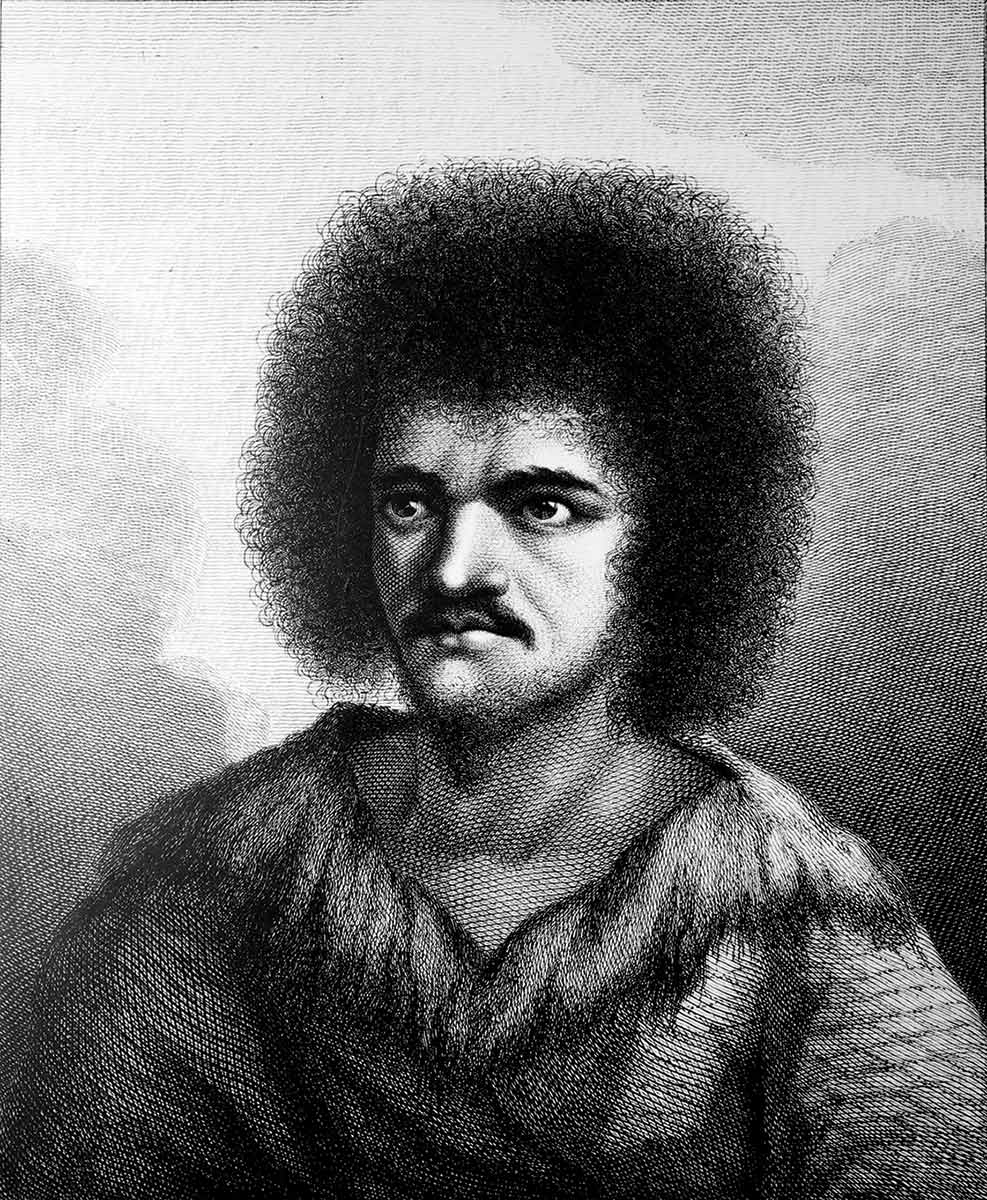
- Ahutoru
- Died: 6 November 1771; Fort-Dauphin

Ahutoru (Note: Also written "Ahu-toru", "Aoutorou" etc.) (c. 1740 – 6 November 1771) was a Raiatean man, brother and adopted son of Ereti, the chief of the village where Louis Antoine de Bougainville anchored. He became the foremost intermediary between the Tahitians and the French during the visit, and volunteered to accompany Bougainville on his journey back to France. After one year in Paris, Ahutoru undertook the journey back to Tahiti, but he died of smallpox on the way.

== Biography ==
Ahutoru was born on Raiatea, around 1740. He was the son of a slave taken from Oopoa, and of the king of Raiatea. He was around 30 years old when Bougainville arrived at Tahiti.

After Bougainville's arrival in Tahiti, Ahutoru boarded Étoile with gifts, and stayed the night. Bougainville first attempted to call Ahutoru "Louis de Cythère", but after he befriended Bougainville, he started using the name "Butaveri", the tahitianised version of Bougainville's name.

Ahutoru had himself dressed in the French fashion by Commerson's valet, who was Jeanne Baret in disguise. Ahutoru quickly recognised her as a woman and revealed her as such to the other members of the crew. Ahutoru courted Baret with insistence until Commerson led him to believe that she was married.

On 15 April 1768, Boudeuse and Étoile set sail to depart Tahiti. Seeing the frigates readying for departure, Tahitians came on boats to give their farewell. The chief gifted Bougainville a boat sail, and asked him to take Ahutoru with him. Bougainville promised to provide him with the means to return to Tahiti.

En route, Bougainville had French lessons given to Ahutoru. However, Ahutoru never had more than a rudimentary command of French. He nevertheless managed to communicate, enlightening Bougainville on aspects of Tahitian life that had eluded the French during the few days they had spent on the island. In particular, Ahutoru informed Bougainville that war was a common state of affairs between the islands, that they practiced slavery and human sacrifices, and that a strict class system was in force. He thus became the prime source of information for Bougainville's ethnographic work about Tahiti. Ahutoru also impressed the crew with his knowledge of astronomy and his skills as a navigator. (Note: Ahutoru even at first attempted to dictate the course of Boudeuse, wishing to call at all the islands in sight to have sexual encounters. Bougainville did not yield.) Bougainville also noted that Ahutoru composed poetry in his native language to describe his experiences on Boudeuse.

On 3 May 1768, Boudeuse and Étoile arrived at Samoa where Ahutoru proved contemptuous of the inhabitants and could not understand their language. Bougainville had hoped that Ahutoru could serve as an interpreter in further first contacts, but these contacts proved too rare, and the languages in the archipelago too diverse, for the idea to be practical. In September, Boudeuse and Étoile called at Batavia, which impressed Ahutoru, but where many of the crew caught dysentery, Ahutoru himself included. He finally arrived at Saint-Malo on Boudeuse on 16 March 1769.

Bougainville and Ahutoru departed for Versailles immediately. On 25 April, Ahutoru also met Jacob Rodrigues Pereira, who examined him. Pereira concluded that the Tahitian phonetic system to which Ahutoru was used allowed him to pronounce only a few of the French Consonants, and none of the nasal vowels.

During the summer of 1769, Ahutoru was introduced in the high society, notably meeting Louis XV and Denis Diderot. He developed a marked taste for opera. Ahutoru was well-adjusted to the life in Paris, easily navigating the city and using money. He befriended Béatrix de Choiseul-Stainville, whom he often visited when she was in Paris. Ahutoru had multiple relationships with women in Paris, including with sex workers.

Ahutoru's presence in Paris yielded controversy: Bougainville was accused of unethically removing Ahutoru from what he himself said was paradise on earth, to bring him to Paris as an exhibit. Bougainville had to defend himself and insisted that Ahutoru had volunteered to come.

After a year, Ahutoru was homesick and lonely in Paris. Bougainville paid to offer him passage back to Tahiti, and the Duchess of Gramont offered money to purchase tools, grain and cattle for Tahiti. On 27 February 1770, Ahutoru departed Paris for La Rochelle, and in late March 1770, he departed Rochefort on Brisson, bound for Port-Louis. Brisson arrived there on 23 October. At Isle de France, Ahutoru was hosted by Poivre, and met Bernardin de Saint-Pierre, who wrote an account describing Ahutoru as intelligent, and noting that he could express himself by signs, and that he used a watch.

Pierre Poivre, the intendent of Isle de France, had orders to return Ahutoru to Tahiti but to also save the cost of chartering a ship especially for the purpose. Ahutoru thus embarked on the 350-tonne fluyt Mascarin, under Marion Dufresne. Mascarin, along with the 300-tonne Maréchal de Castries, were on a mission of exploration to Tasmania, New Zealand and ultimately Tahiti. Ahutoru then changed his name to "Mayoa" in honour of Marion, as he had previously done with Bougainville.

Ahutoru departed Isle de France on Mascarin on 18 October 1771, but arriving at Saint-Denis, he fell ill with smallpox. Marion continued on to Madagascar, but Ahutoru died at Fort Dauphin in Madagascar (now Tôlanaro) in the evening of 6 November 1771. Lieutenant Roux noted: "his passing affects us all the more that he was one of the reasons for our expedition, and that he was a good man." Ahutoru was buried at sea with his clothes and personal effects, and given a Christian ceremony.

== Works about Ahutoru ==
Bougainville authored two works about Autoru, Récit sur le séjour de Boutaveri en France ("tales of Butaveri's stay in France") and Impressions de voyage de Aotoutou ("Ahutoru's voyage journal"), now lost. La Condamine authored Observations sur l'insulaire de la Polynésie ramené de l'île de Tahiti par M. de Bougainville. Jacques Delille wrote a poem depicting Ahutoru falling in tears at the sight of a tree from Tahiti.

There exists no known portrait of Ahutoru.
