= Laumière station =

Metro station in Paris, France

Laumière
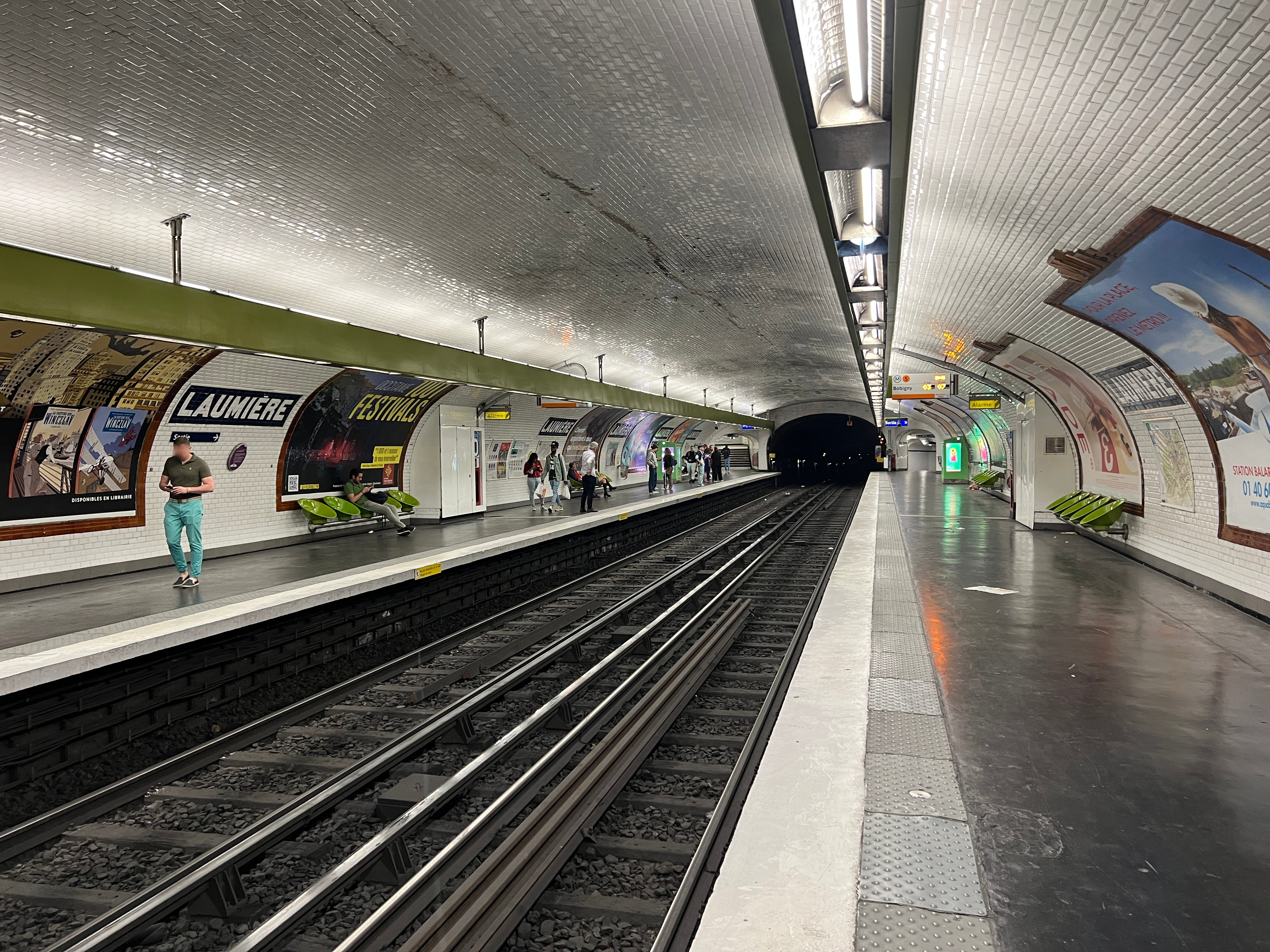

General information
- Location: Av. Jean Jaurès × Rue Pierre Girard; 34, av. de Laumière; 43, av. de Laumière; 19th arrondissement of Paris; Île-de-France; France
- Coordinates: 48°53′06″N 2°22′44″E
- Owner: RATP
- Operator: RATP
- Line: Paris Metro Paris Metro Line 5
- Platforms: 2 (2 side platforms)
- Tracks: 2

Construction
- Accessible: No

Other information
- Station code: 22-13
- Fare zone: 1

History
- Opened: 12 October 1942

Passengers
- 3,258,568 (2021)

Services
| Preceding station | Paris Metro | Following station |
|---|---|---|
| Jaurès towards Place d'Italie | Line 5 | Ourcq towards Bobigny–Pablo Picasso |
Location
- Location within Paris

Laumière (French pronunciation: [lomjɛʁ]) is a station of the Paris Métro on line 5 in the 19th arrondissement. It is named after the nearby avenue de Laumière, which was in turn named after Xavier Jean-Marie Clément Vernhet de Laumière (1812-1863), a general killed during the French intervention in Mexico in the 19th century.

== History ==
Laumière opened on October 12, 1942 during the extension of line 5 from Gare du Nord to Eglise de Pantin.

Between 1974 and 1984, like a third of the stations on the network, the station was renovated and modernised in the Andreu-Motte style. As part of the "Renouveau du métro" programme by the RATP, the station was renovated and modernised on 31 May 2002.

On 1 April 2017, the nameplates on the station's platforms were temporarily replaced by the RATP as part of April Fool's Day for the second consecutive year, together with 10 other stations (including 2 RER stations). It was humorously renamed "Qui a éteint la Laumière?" (Who extinguished Laumière?).

In 2019, the station was used by 4,325,317 passengers, making it the 106th busiest of the Métro network out of 302 stations.

In 2020, the station was used by 2,107,812 passengers amidst the COVID-19 pandemic, making it the 115th busiest of the Métro network out of 305 stations.

In 2021, the station was used by 3,258,568 passengers, making it the 94th busiest of the Métro network out of 305 stations.

== Passenger services ==
=== Access ===
The station has three accesses:

- Access 1: avenue Jean Jaurès Gymnase
- Access 2: avenue de Laumière
- Access 3: rue de Meaux (with an ascending escalator)

=== Station layout ===
Street Level
| B1 | Mezzanine |
| Platform level | Side platform, doors will open on the right |
| Platform level | Southbound | ← toward Place d'Italie (Jaurès) |
| Platform level | Northbound | toward Bobigny – Pablo Picasso (Ourcq) → |
| Platform level | Side platform, doors will open on the right |

=== Platform ===
Laumière is a standard configuration station with two platforms separated by metro tracks under an elliptical roof. The decoration is Andreu-Motte style green, with two light canopies, flat tile benches and Motte seating in the same colour. In contrast, the tunnel exits and outlets of the corridors as well as the walls and the vault, are covered with white bevelled ceramic tiles. The advertising frames are a faience honey colour and topped with the letter "M". The name of the station is also faience in the style of the original Compagnie du chemin de fer métropolitain de Paris (CMP). These same frames are present in only seven other stations of the Paris metro and the two following stations of Line 5, Jaurès and Stalingrad. With the latter two, they are the only two stations married in the Andreu-Motte style and these advertising of frames.

=== Other connections ===
The station is also served by line 60 of the RATP Bus Network, and at night, by lines N13, N41, and N45 of the Noctilien network.

== Nearby ==
- Bassin de la Villette
- Église Saint-Jacques-Saint-Christophe de la Villette
- Canal de l'Ourcq
- Collège Édouard-Pailleron
- Mairie du 19^{e} arrondissement de Paris (Town hall of the 19th arrondissement)
- Pont levant de la rue de Crimée
- Square Marcel-Mouloudji
- Square Serge-Reggiani
- Théâtre des Artisans

== Gallery ==
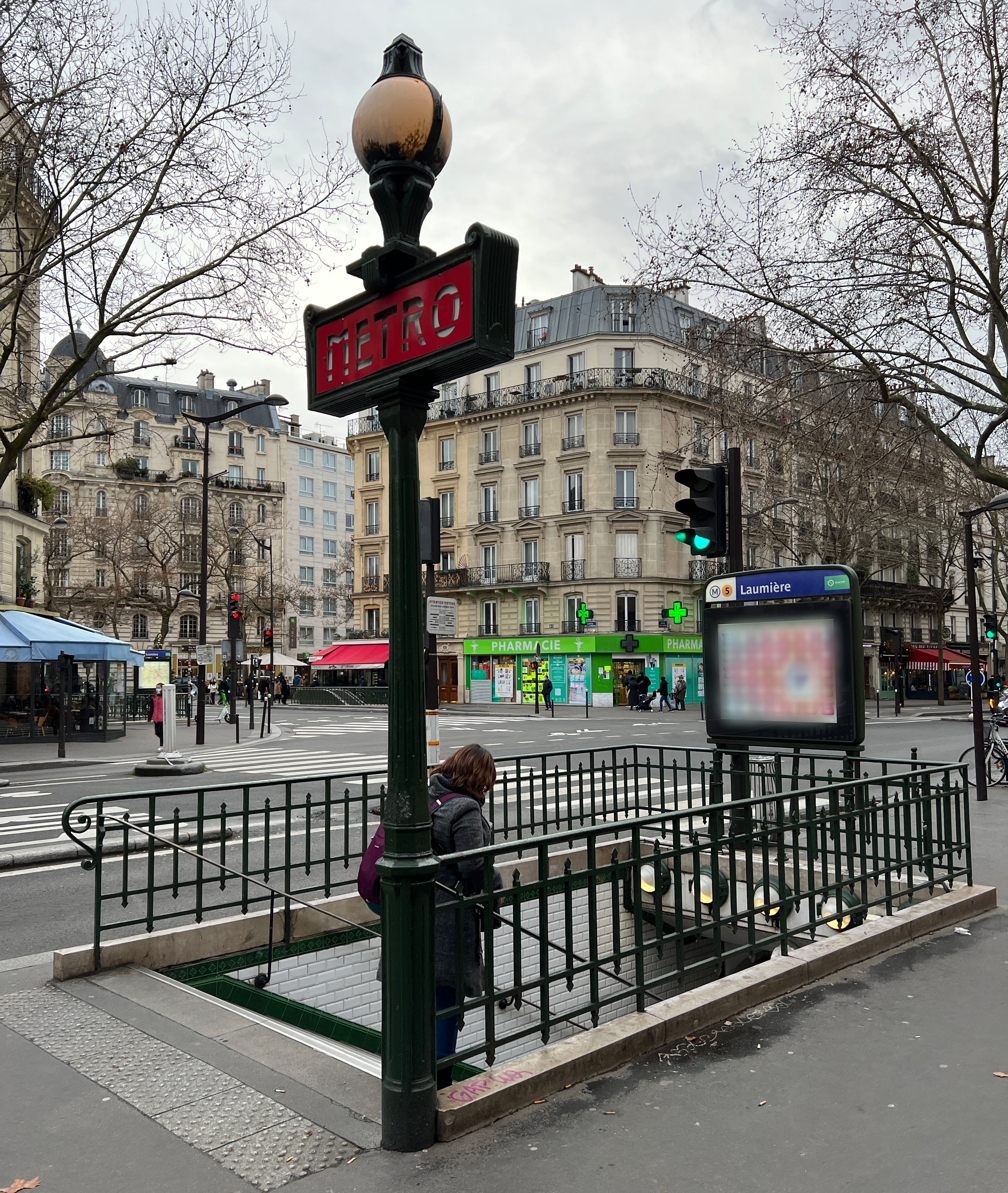
Access 1

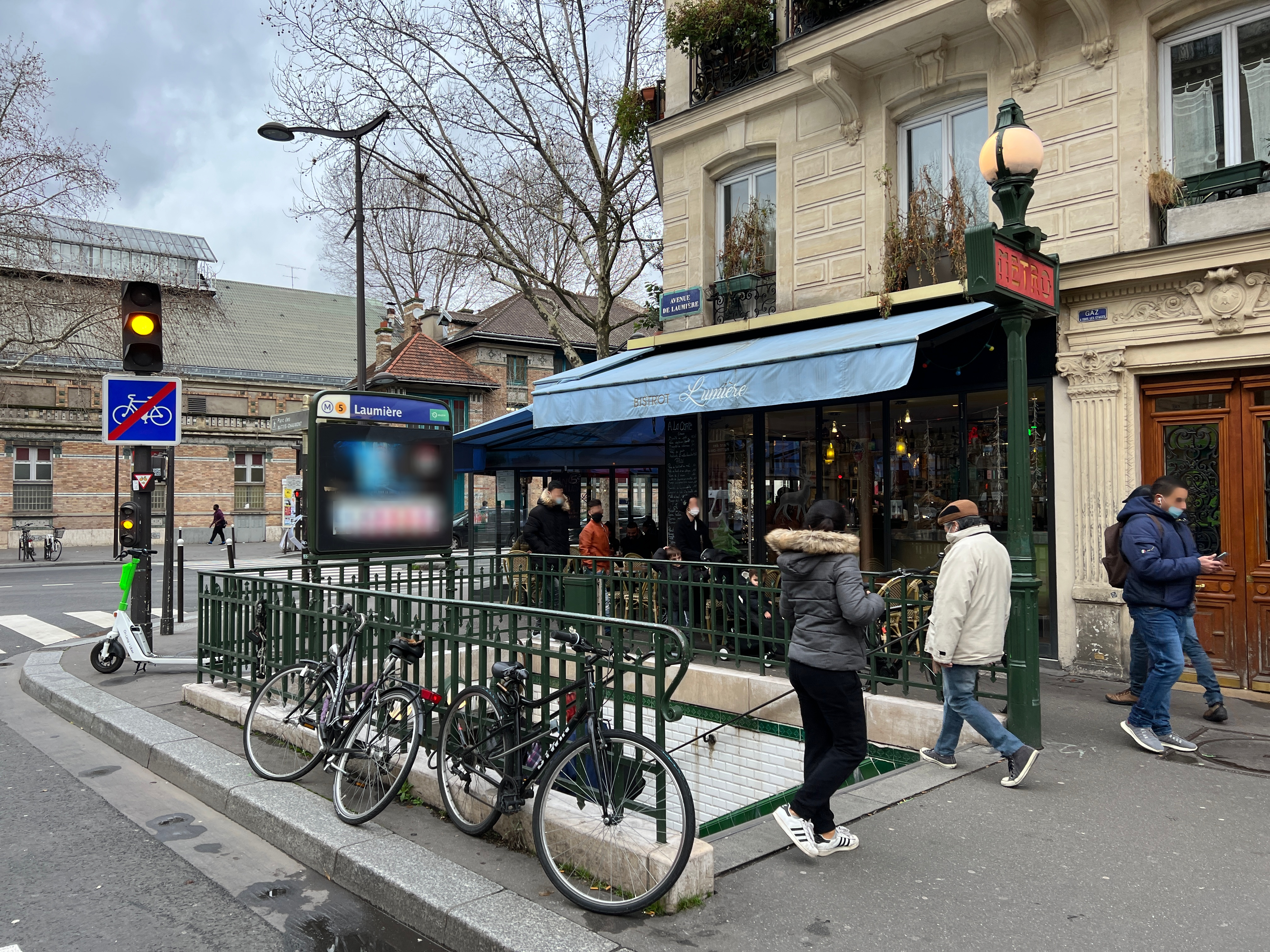
Access 2

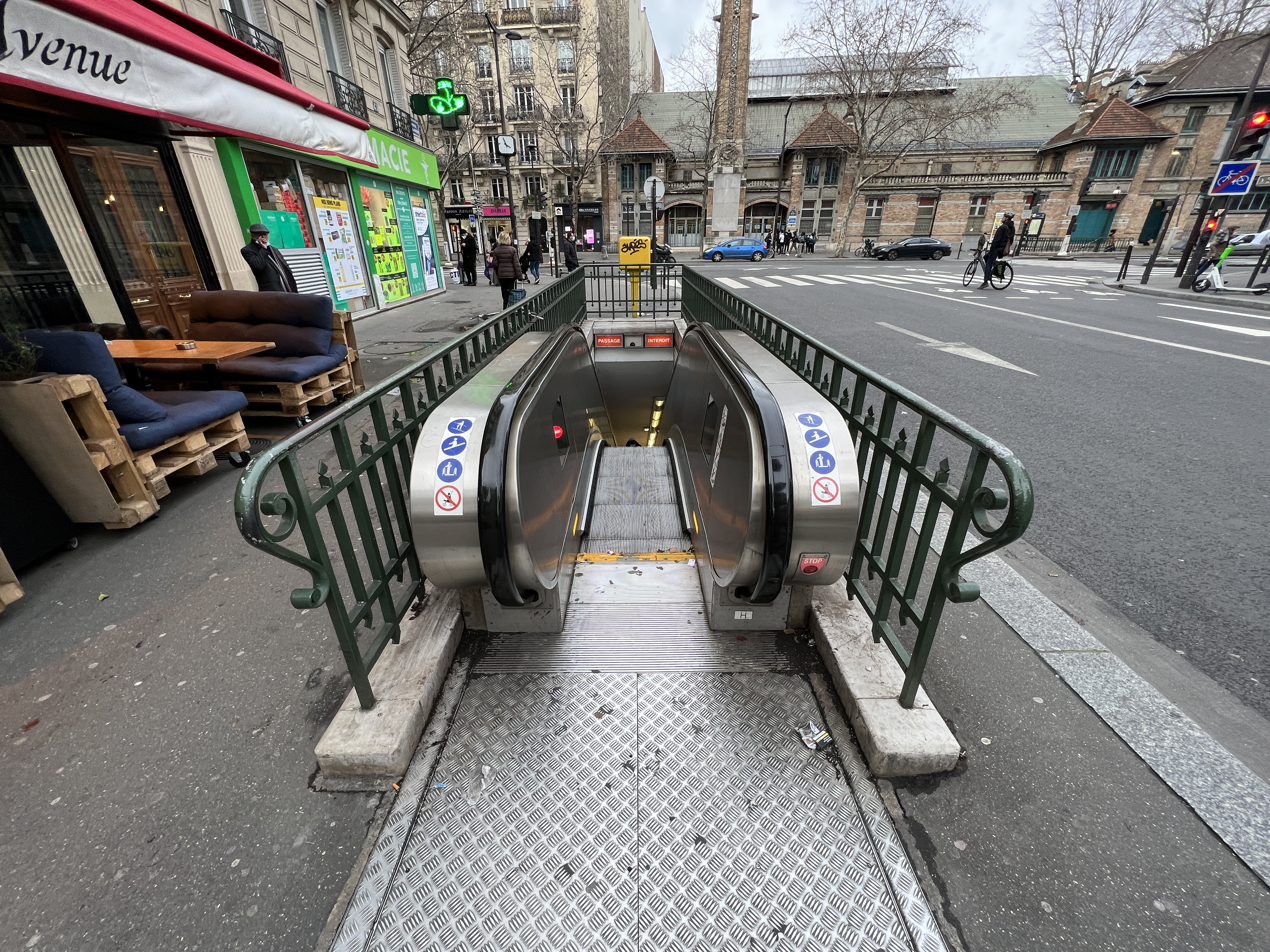
Access 3

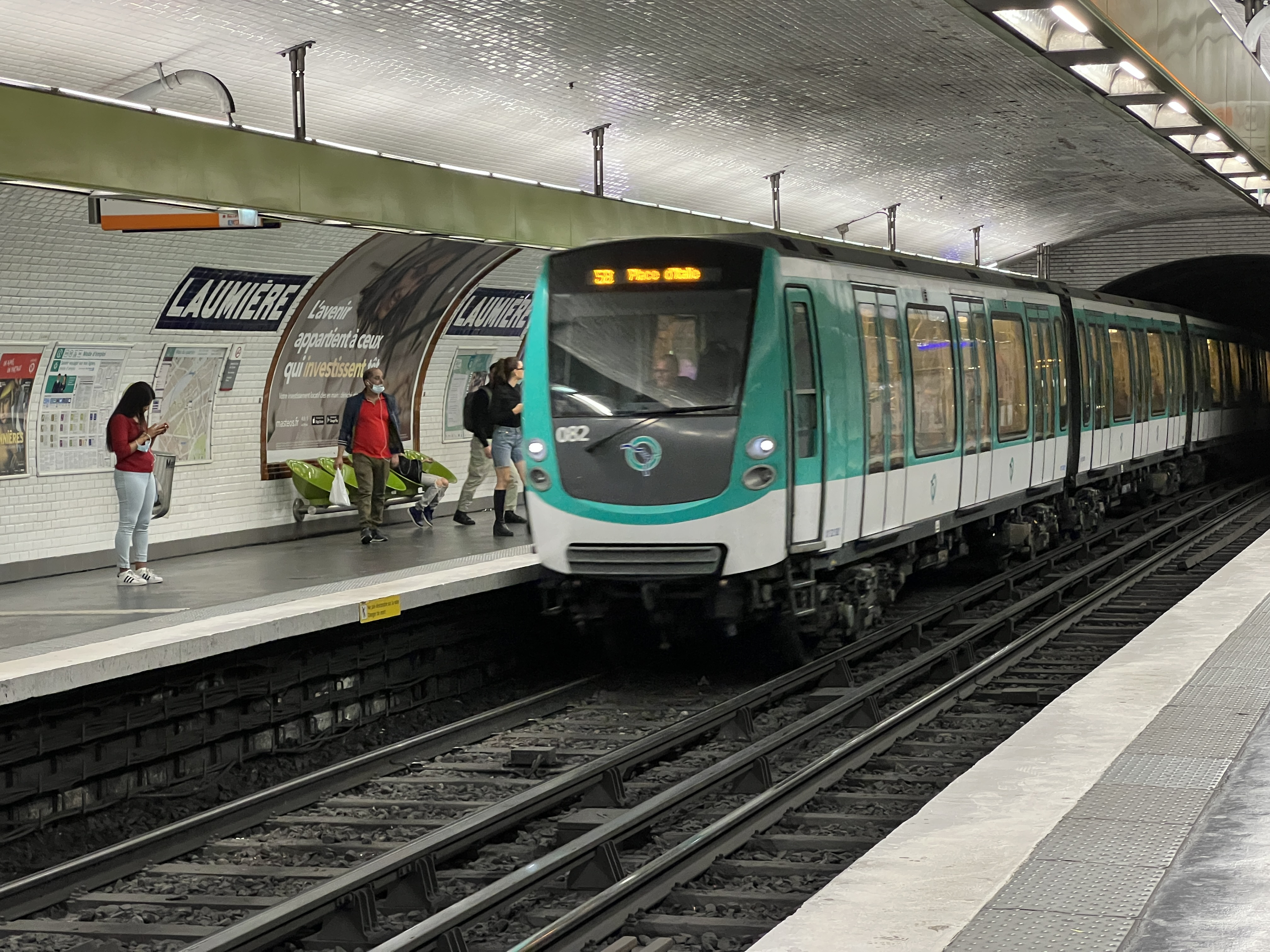
MF 01 at Laumière
