= Cimetière de la Villette =

Cemetery in Paris, France

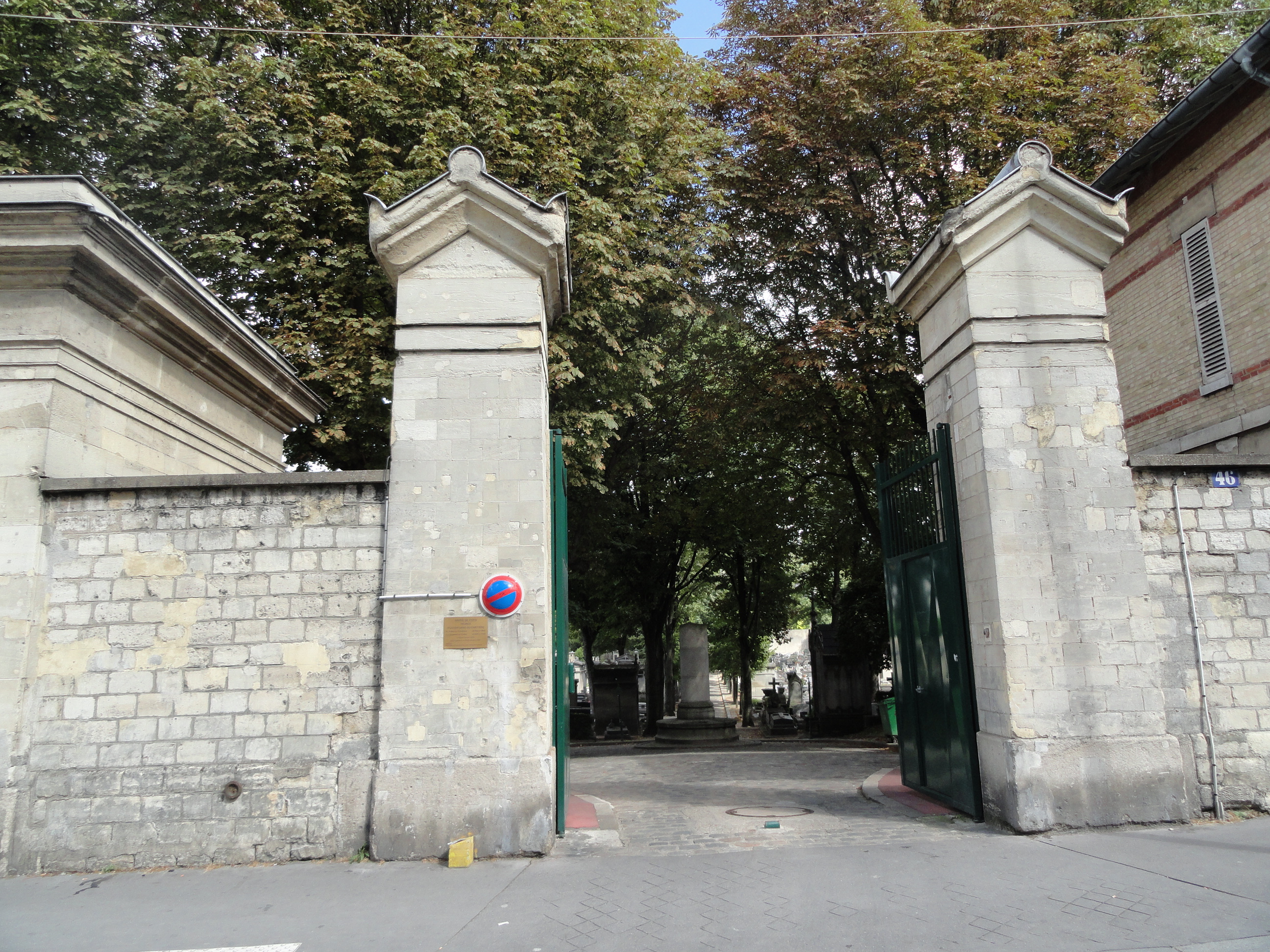
- Main entrance to the cemetery of La Villette.
- Interactive map of Cimetière de la Villette

Details
- Established: 1828
- Location: Paris
- Country: France
- Coordinates: 48.885°N 2.387°E
- Type: Public, non-denominational
- Owned by: Mairie de Paris
- Size: 1.13 hectares (2.8 acres)
- No. of interments: 2,500
- Find a Grave: Cimetière de la Villette

The Cimetière de la Villette is a small cemetery in Paris.

== Location ==
The entrance to the cemetery is located at 46 Rue d'Hautpoul in the 19th arrondissement of Paris.

== History ==
With an area of 1.13 ha, it was opened in 1828 and houses 2,500 graves. It was enlarged in 1843. Initially the fourth cemetery of the commune of La Villette, it became the cemetery reserved for the burials of the inhabitants of the 19th arrondissement of Paris, after the annexation in 1860 of the commune of La Villette in Paris. Since 1880, it has only kept perpetual concessions. It is embellished with a hundred trees, maples, lime trees and chestnut trees.

It is located below the Allée Darius-Milhaud which follows the route of the old railway branch of the Chemin de fer de Petite Ceinture line leading to the Paris-Bestiaux and Paris-Abattoirs stations. It is visible from the latter through large openings made in the new perimeter wall.

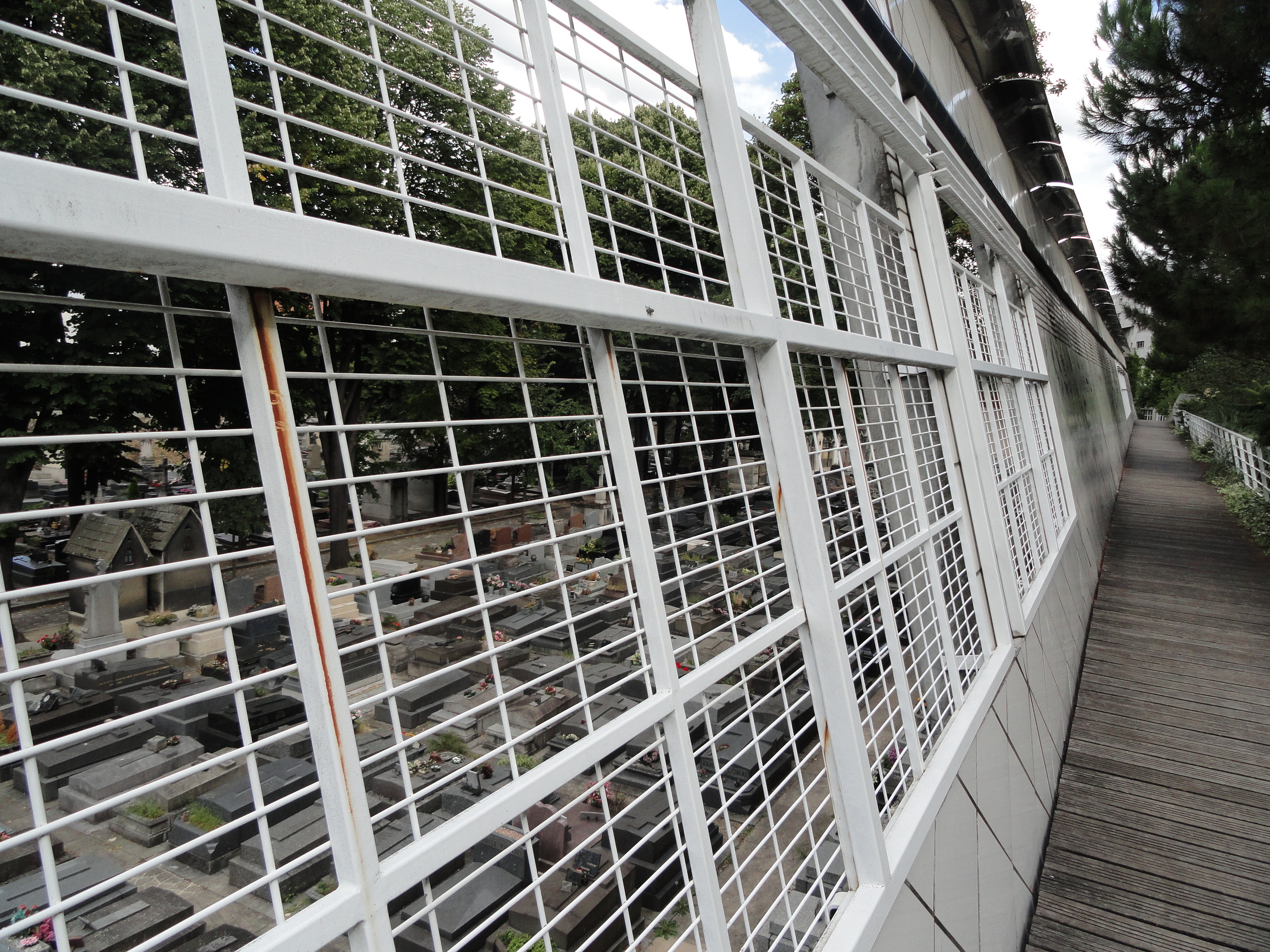
The cemetery, seen from the Allée Darius-Milhaud

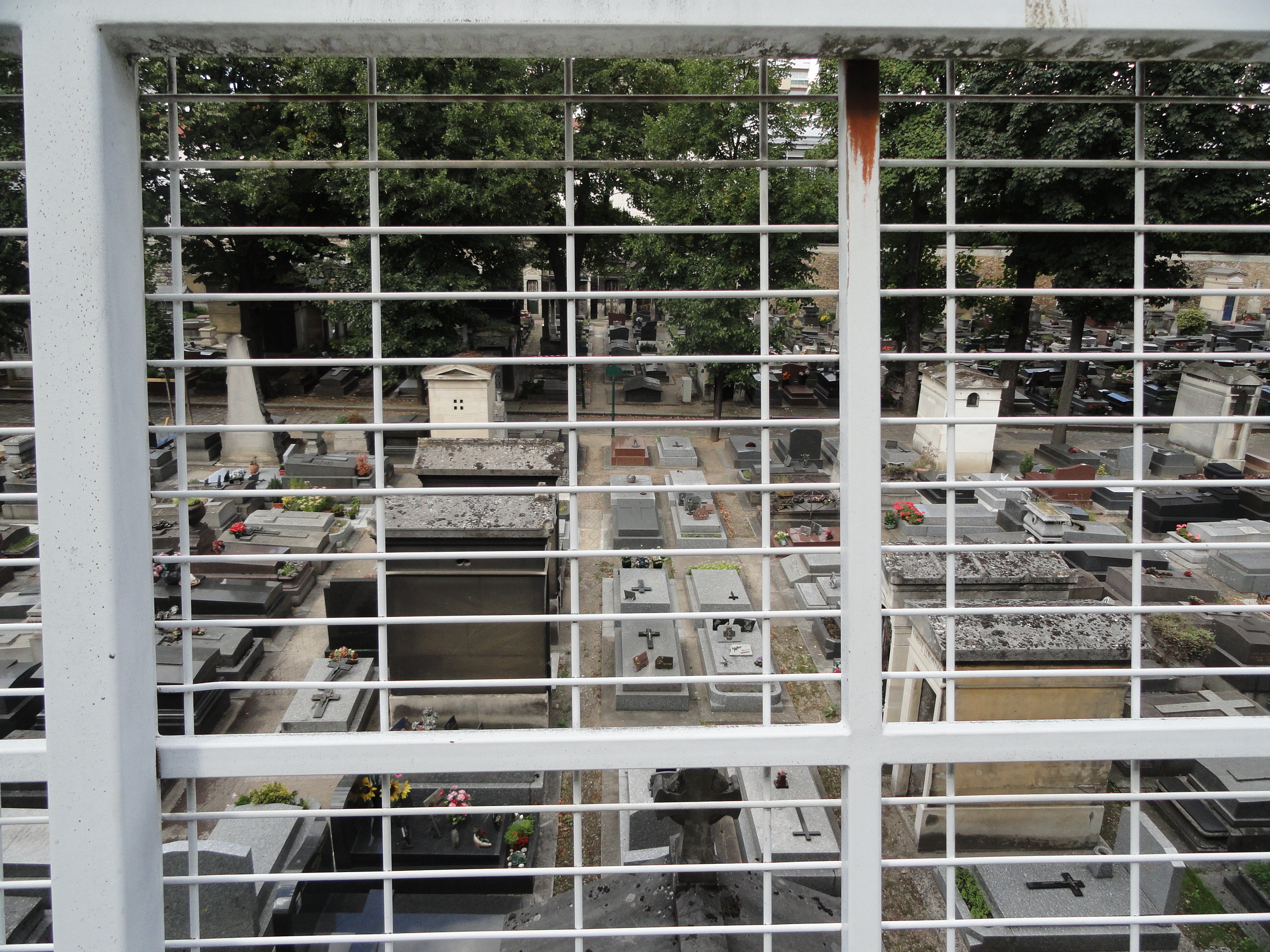
The cemetery, seen from the Allée Darius-Milhaud
