= Notre-Dame-des-Champs =

Notre-Dame-des-Champs may refer to:

- Our Lady of the Fields
- Notre-Dame-des-Champs, Paris
- Notre-Dame-des-Champs station, a Paris Metro station
- Notre-Dame-des-Champs, Ontario
