= Allée Claude Cahun–Marcel Moore =

Parisian street

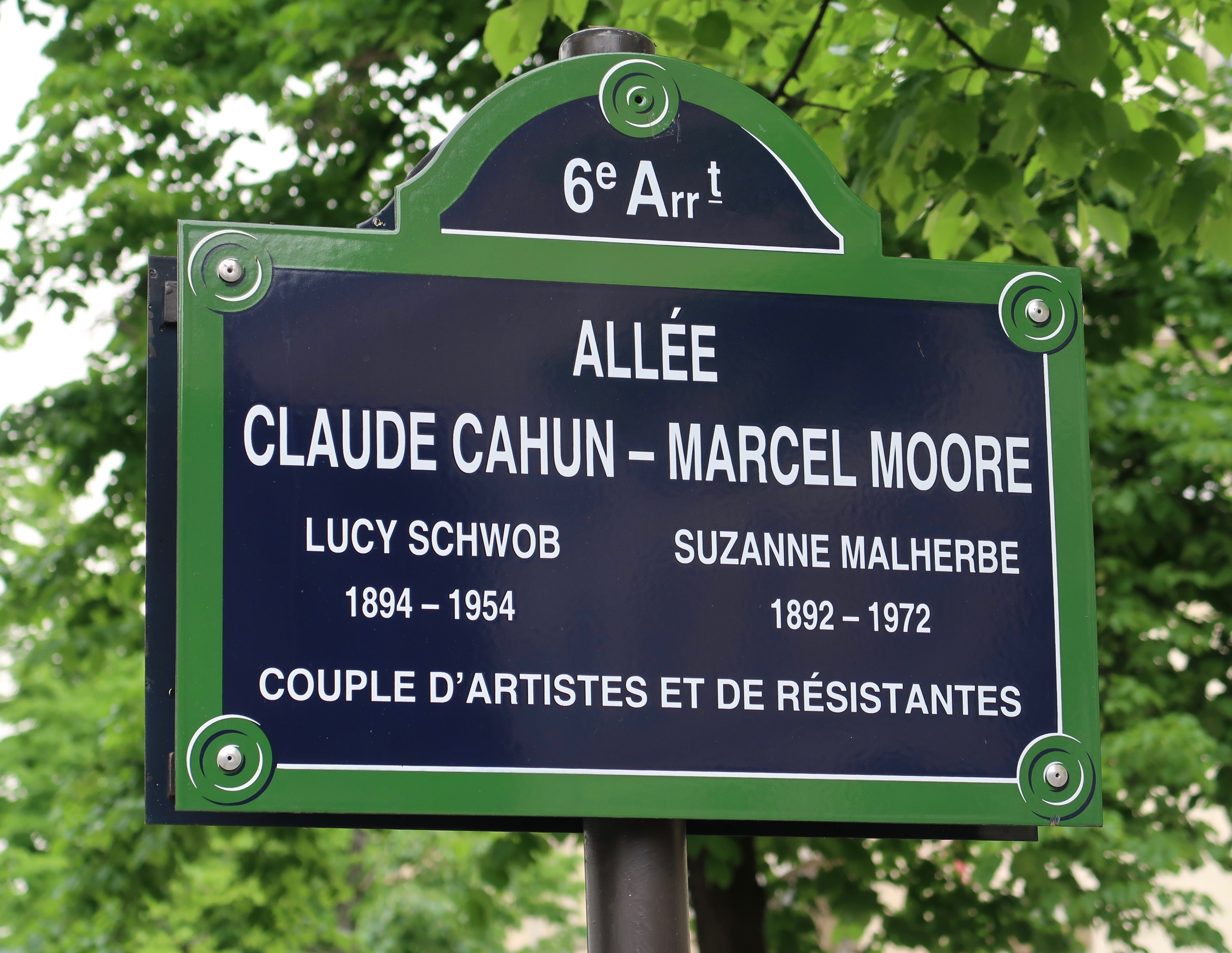

- Location within Paris
- Arrondissement: 6th
- Quarter: Montparnasse
- Coordinates: 48°50′47″N 2°19′43″E
- From: Boulevard Raspail, Rue de Fleurus
- To: Rue Huysmans

Construction
- Completion: 1607

The Allée Claude Cahun–Marcel Moore is a street in Montparnasse in the 6th arrondissement of Paris, France.

== History ==
It was named after French artists and Resistance fighters Claude Cahun and Marcel Moore.

The couple had its workshop and live Notre-Dame-des-Champs, close to the street.

This is the first street in the world named officially after a same-sex couple.

== Access ==
Notre-Dame-des-Champs (Paris Métro) has access on the street, designed on a rambla style (with the entrance located on a central sidewalk).

== Places of interest ==
- École des hautes études en sciences sociales
- Alliance française of Paris
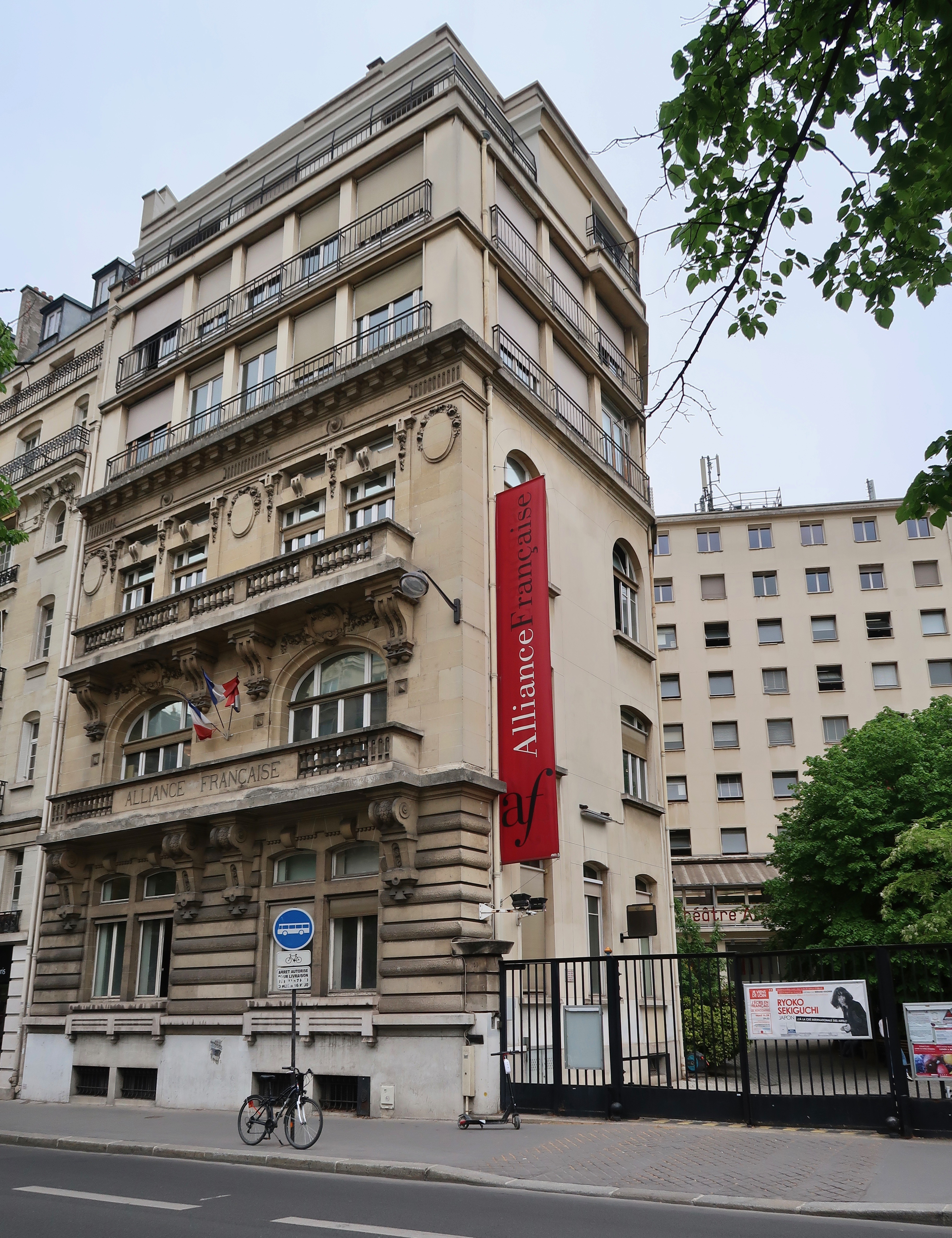
Alliance française, 101 boulevard Raspail.

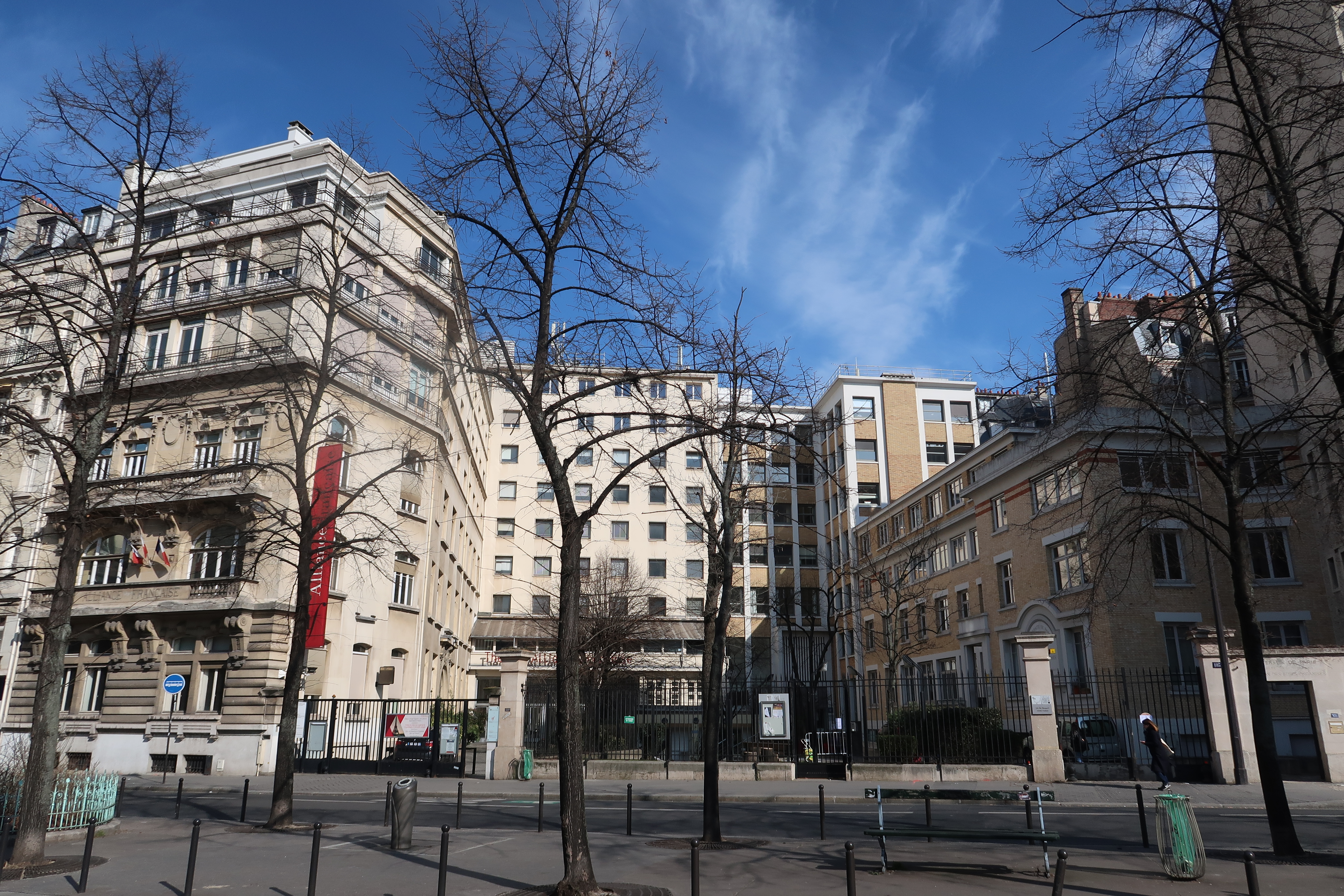
Winter on the promenade.
