= Léon Ginain =

French architect

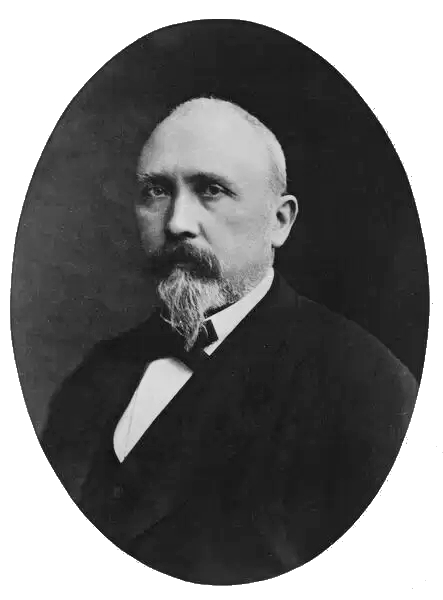
Léon Ginain (date unknown)

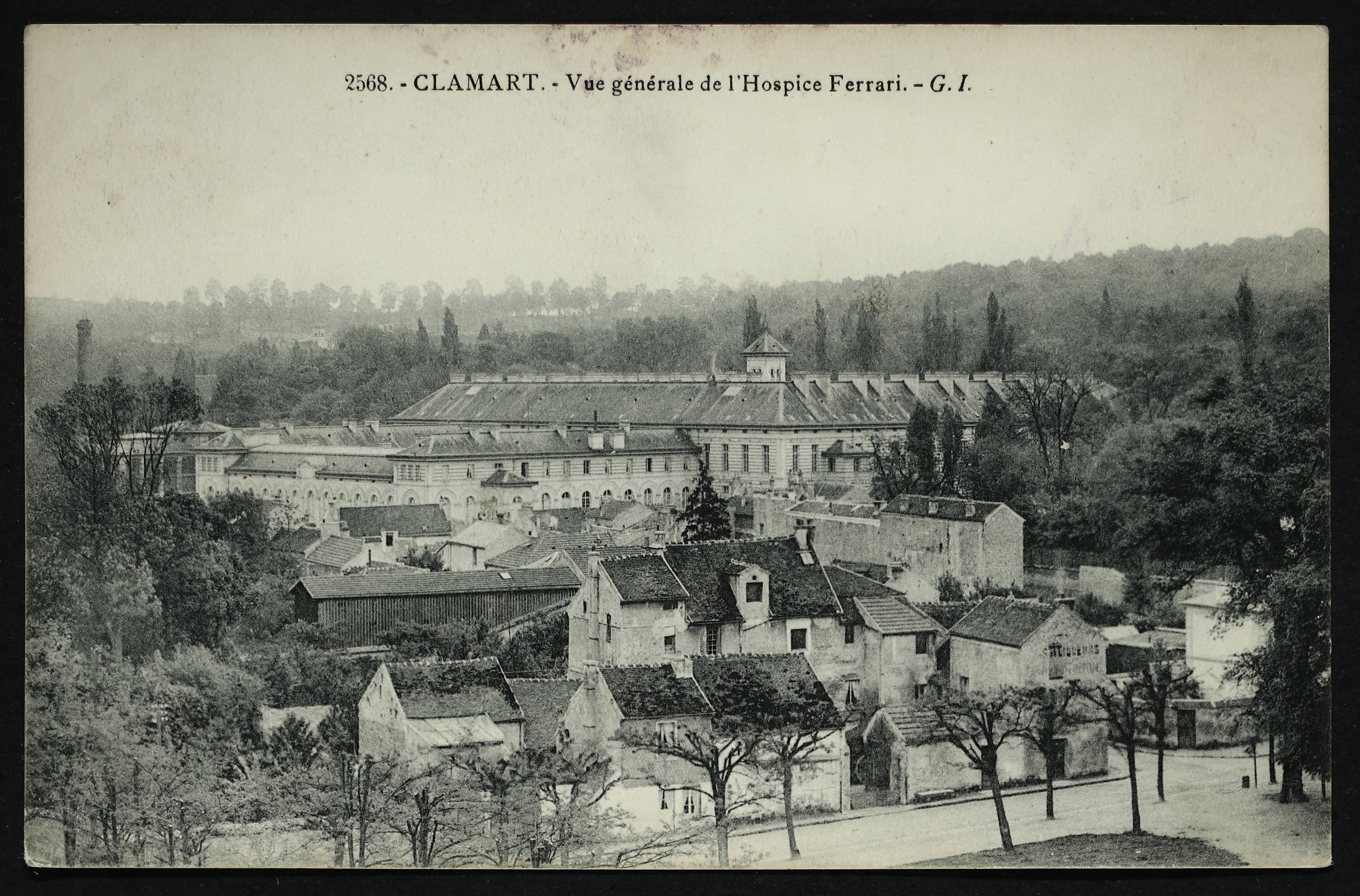
Postcard of the Ferrari Hospice (1900)

Paul-René-Léon Ginain (5 October 1825, Paris - 7 March 1898, Paris) was a French architect.

== Life and works ==
He studied with Louis-Hippolyte Lebas at the École des Beaux-Arts. After having won the Prix de Rome in 1852, he stayed at the Villa Médicis in Rome from 1853 to 1857.

As the official Architect of the City of Paris, he was in charge of the 6th Arrondissement. He was also a professor at the École. His notable students there include Emmanuel Masqueray and Ferdinand Dutert. In 1881, he was elected to the Académie des Beaux-Arts, where he took Seat #3 for architecture, succeeding Hector-Martin Lefuel (deceased).

Between 1867 and 1876, together with Gustave Eiffel and Eugène Bonté, he worked on rebuilding the church of Notre-Dame-des-Champs, which had been destroyed during the Revolution. In 1878, he was commissioned by Maria Brignole Sale De Ferrari to build the Ferrari Hospice for retired domestic workers, in Clamart, a project which occupied him for ten years. Shortly after, she also commissioned him to design the Palais Galliera and supervise its construction, which would occupy him until 1894.

He was initially interred at the Cimetière de Montmartre, but his remains were transferred to the Cimetière du Montparnasse in 1911.
