= Boulevard Raspail =

Boulevard in Paris, France

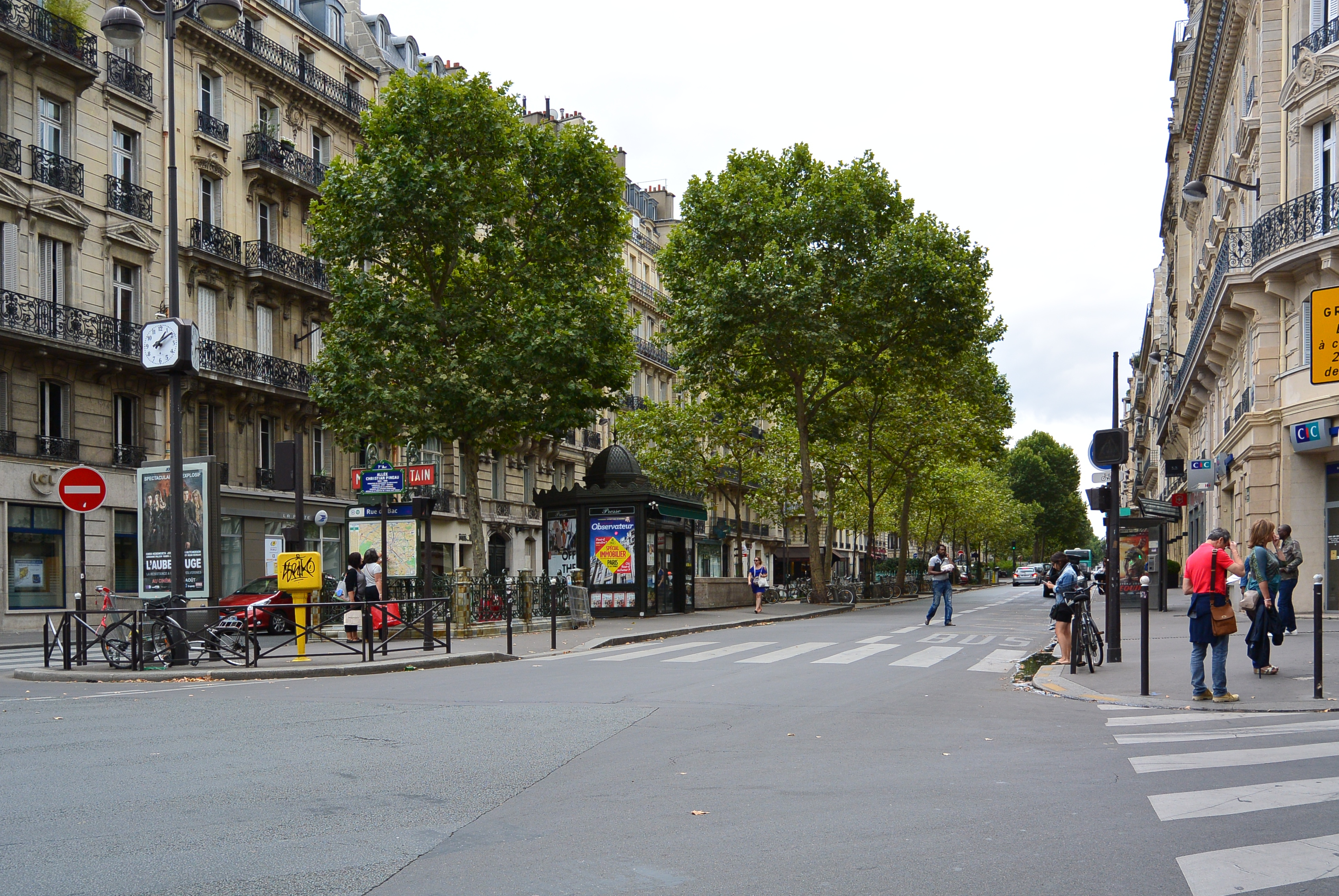

- Location within Paris
- Length: 2,370 m (7,780 ft)
- Width: 30 m (98 ft)
- Arrondissement: 6th, 7th, 14th
- Quarter: Notre-Dame-des-Champs, Montparnasse
- Coordinates: 48°50′42″N 2°19′43″E
- From: 205, Boulevard Saint-Germain and 61, Rue du Bac
- To: Place Denfert-Rochereau

Construction
- Denomination: 9 July 1887; 139 years ago

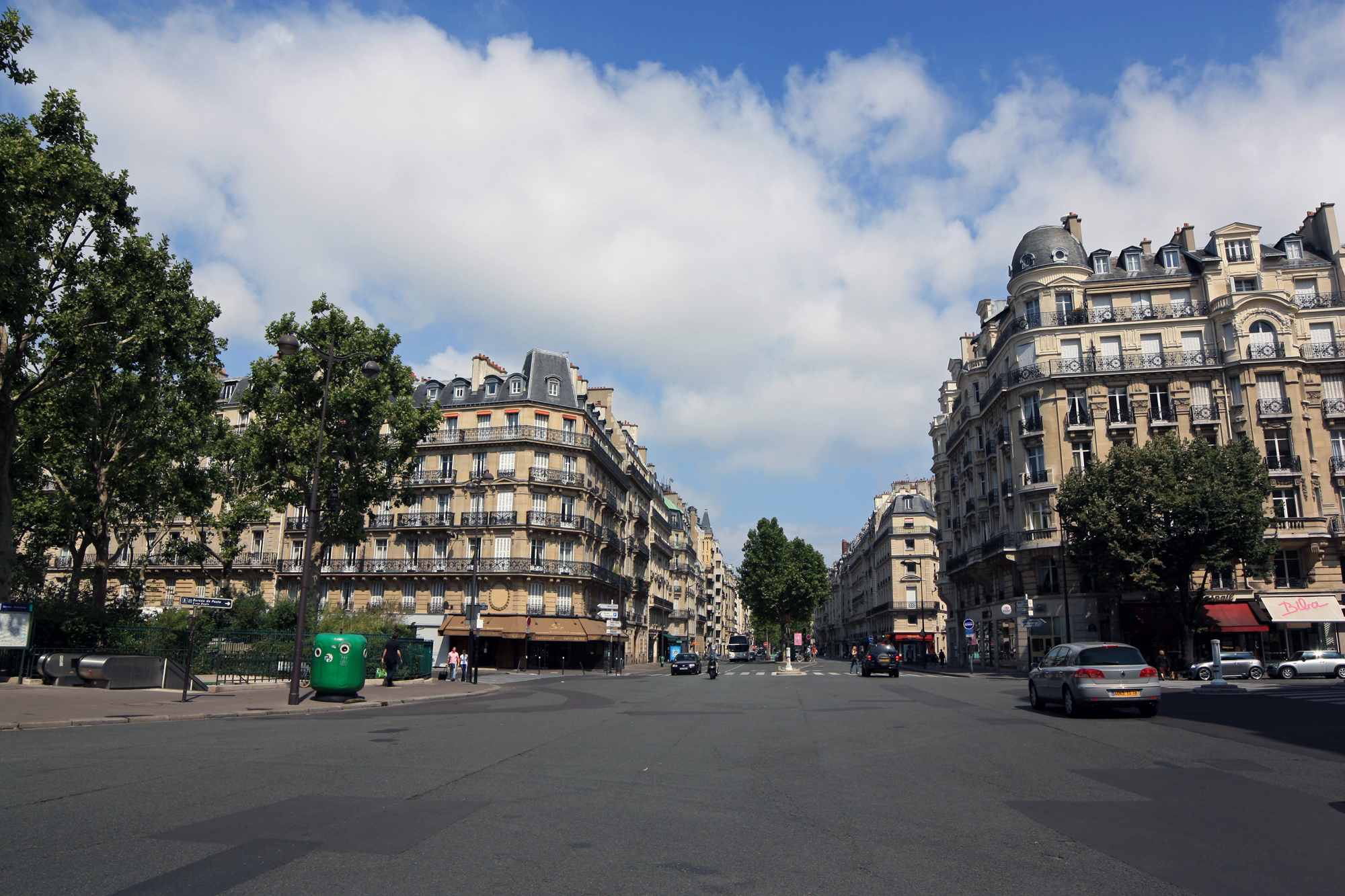
Boulevard Raspail crossing the Rue de Sèvres and the Rue de Babylone. Sèvres–Babylone Métro station at the left.

The Boulevard Raspail (French pronunciation: [bulvaʁ ʁaspaj]) is a boulevard of the Rive Gauche of Paris, France. Its orientation is north–south, and joins the Boulevard Saint-Germain with the Place Denfert-Rochereau whilst traversing the 7th, 6th and 14th arrondissements. The boulevard intersects major roadways: the Rue de Sèvres, the Rue de Rennes and the Boulevard du Montparnasse. The Allée Claude-Cahun-Marcel-Moore is situated on the boulevard, in front of the Alliance française. Its former name was the Boulevard d'Enfer, of which the passage d'Enfer is a vestigial relic.

== Naming ==
The boulevard was named after François-Vincent Raspail (1794–1878), French chemist, physician and politician.

== History ==
The section between a point approximately 80 m beyond the Rue de Varenne and Rue de Sèvres was dug in 1869. The 90 m section from the Rue Stanislas was opened up by MM. Bernard frères.

The section between the Boulevard Edgar-Quinet and the Place Denfert-Rochereau had incorporated the old Boulevard d'Enfer and the external boulevard (part of the Boulevard de Montrouge) into a single road by the law of 16 June 1859. Its width was 70 m before the decree of 14 September 1892.

The modernist architect Le Corbusier criticizes the Boulevard Raspail in Toward an Architecture for its disregard of proper proportion and capriciousness.

In 1933, the enlarged part of the Boulevard Raspail surrounding no. 51, where it meets the Rue du Cherche-Midi, was named the Place Alphonse-Deville. The Chemin de ronde d'Enfer was annexed from the Boulevard Raspail and the Boulevard Edgar-Quinet.

== Sites of interest ==
- At no. 48 is an annex of the Banque de France at the junction of the Rue de Babylone.
- At no. 45 is the Hôtel Lutetia, a large hotel, on the corner of the Rue de Babylone, which welcomed deportees returning from Nazi camps in 1945.
- At no. 54 is the École des hautes études en sciences sociales (EHESS) (former site of the prison du Cherche-Midi) and at no. 105.
- At the crossroads of the Boulevard Raspail and the Boulevard du Montparnasse, also known as the Place Pablo-Picasso, is home of the statue of Honoré de Balzac by Auguste Rodin since 1939.
- At no. 101 are the headquarters of the Alliance française, state-funded organisation whose mission is to spread French language and culture internationally; it houses a school targeted at students on linguistic exchanges or foreigners who have moved to Paris.
- At no. 116–118, at the exit of the Notre-Dame-des-Champs metro station, is the statue of Alfred Dreyfus. The statue was commissioned by Jack Lang of French artist "Tim" in 1985, originally meant for the courtyard of the École Militaire where Dreyfus was court martialled in 1895, but was placed instead on the boulevard following the speech of Jacques Chirac in July 2006, to pacify the military.
- At no. 261 (14th arddt) is home of the Cartier Foundation since 1994. It is housed in an avant garde building by Jean Nouvel made of glass steel and concrete.
- At no. 291 is the head office of Aéroports de Paris.

== Metro stations ==
Located near the Metro stations: Rue du Bac, Rennes, Notre-Dame-des-Champs and Sèvres – Babylone.
