= Notre-Dame-des-Champs station =

Metro station in Paris, France

Notre-Dame-des-Champs
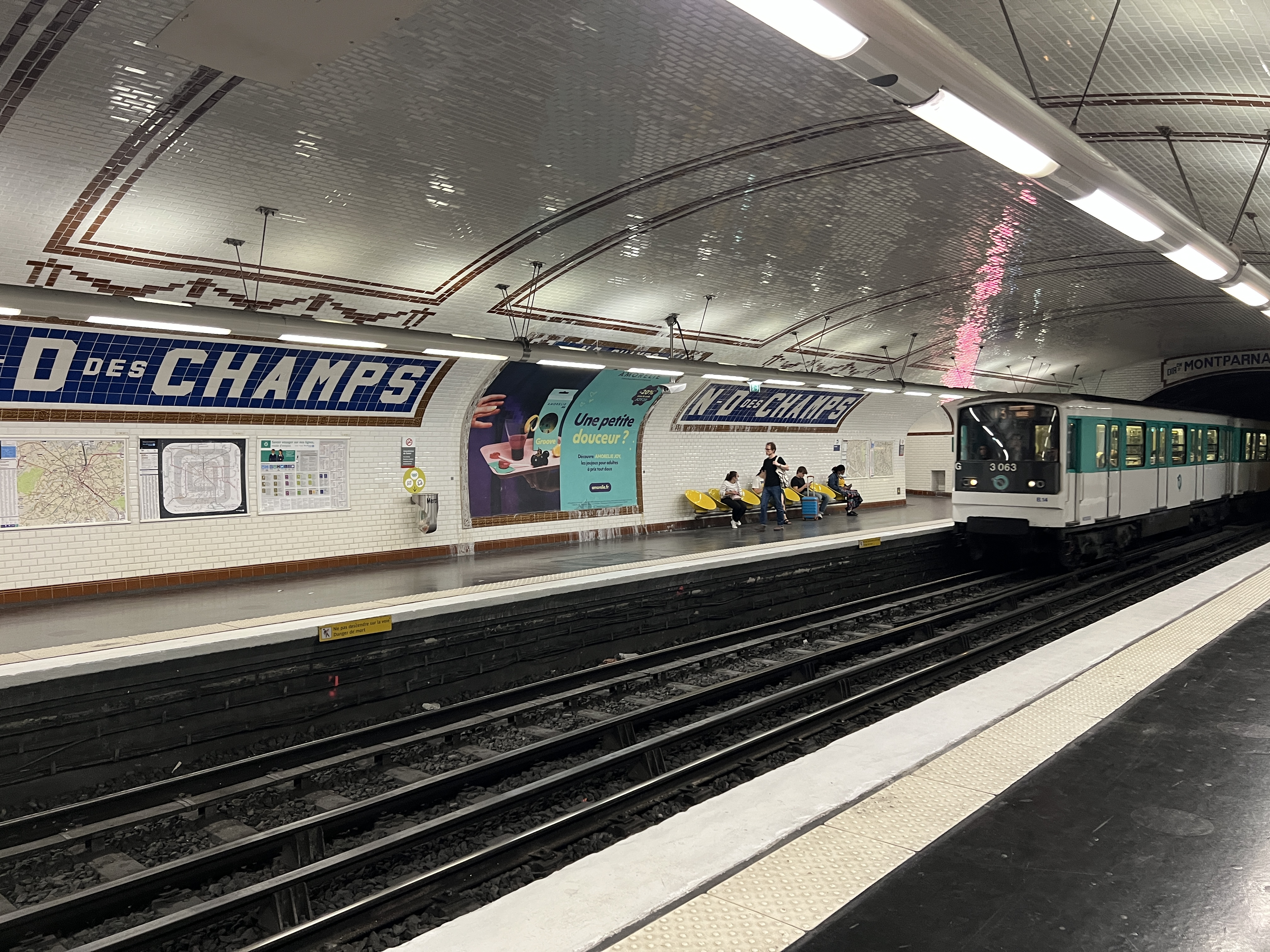
- MF 67 at Notre-Dame-des-Champs

General information
- Location: 6th arrondissement of Paris; Île-de-France; France
- Coordinates: 48°50′40″N 2°19′44″E
- System: Paris Métro station
- Owner: RATP
- Operator: RATP
- Line: Paris Metro Paris Metro Line 12
- Platforms: 2 (side platforms)
- Tracks: 2

Construction
- Accessible: no

Other information
- Station code: 0414
- Fare zone: 1

History
- Opened: 5 November 1910

Passengers
- 1,487,256 (2021)

Services
Preceding station	Paris Metro	Following station
Montparnasse–Bienvenüe towards Mairie d'Issy	Line 12	Rennes towards Mairie d'Aubervilliers
Location
- Location within Paris

Notre-Dame-des-Champs (French pronunciation: [notʁə dam de ʃɑ̃]; lit. 'Our Lady of the Fields') is a station on Line 12 of the Paris Métro in the 6th arrondissement.

It is named after the nearby Notre-Dame-des-Champs Catholic church (under which the line runs) on the Boulevard du Montparnasse, which was designed by the architect and engineer Gustave Eiffel (1832–1923).

== History ==
The station opened on 5 November 1910 as part of the original section of the Nord-Sud Company's Line A between Porte de Versailles and Notre-Dame-de-Lorette. On 1 January 1930, the line was taken over by the Compagnie du chemin de fer métropolitain de Paris (CMP), and was subsequently renamed Line 12 on 27 March 1931.

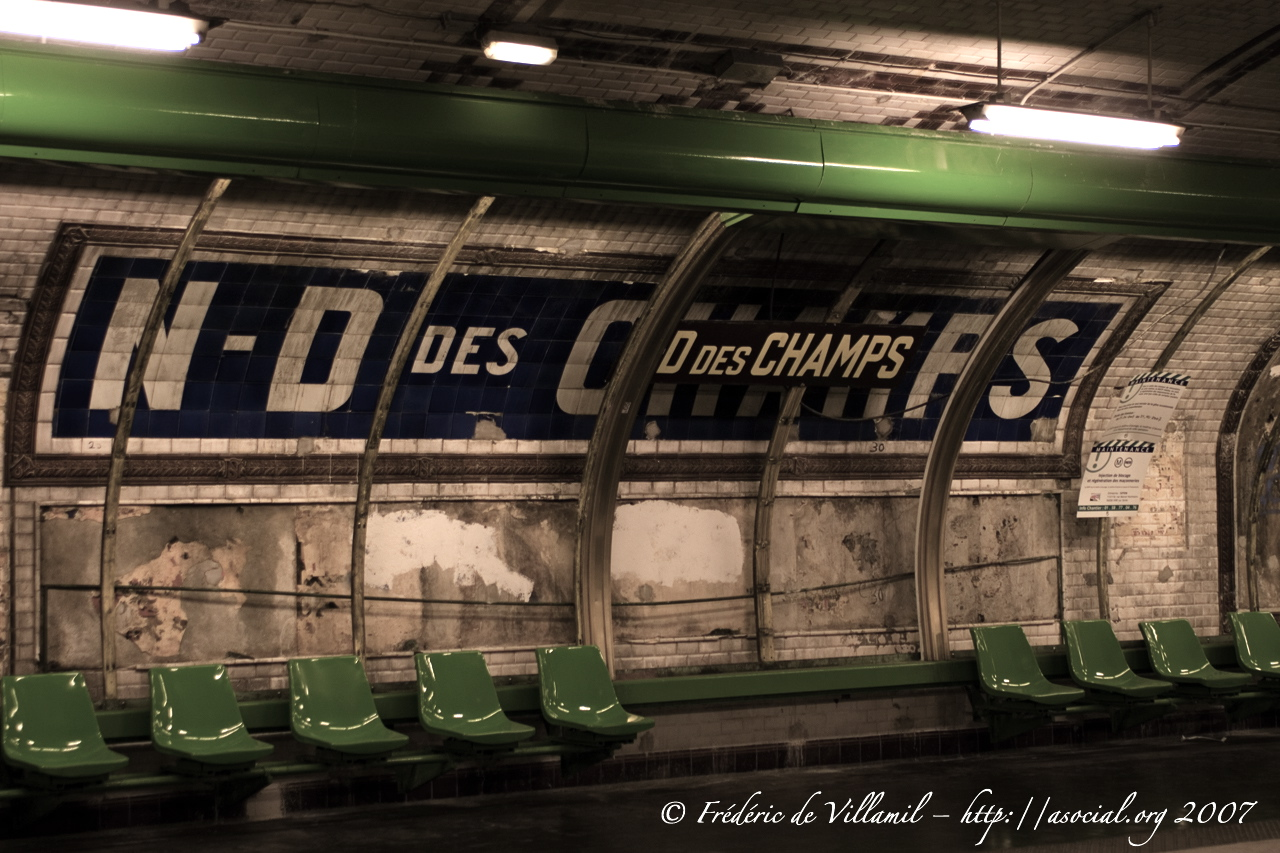
Removal of the metal sheath in progress in 2007, revealing its original Nord-Sud decor.

From the 1950s until 2007, the original tiling on the platforms by Boulenger & Co. was hidden behind a green metal sheath (carrossage). It was removed as part of the "Un métro + beau" programme by the RATP which were completed on 24 June 2008, restoring its original Nord-Sud decor.

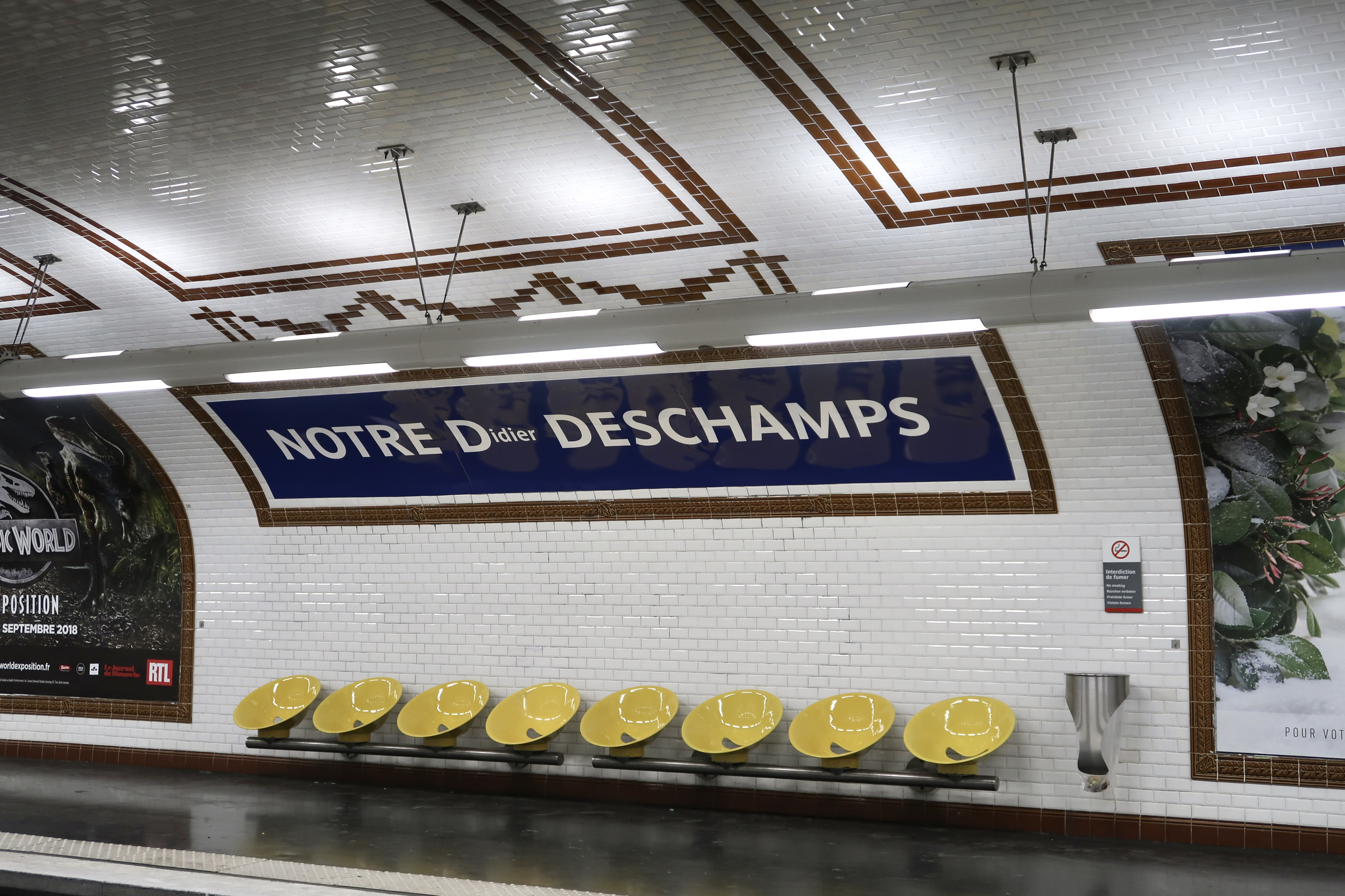
Station temporarily renamed "Notre Didier Deschamps" after the French win at the 2018 FIFA World Cup

On 16 July 2018, the station was temporarily renamed "Notre Didier Deschamps" (Our Didier Deschamps) in homage to Didier Deschamps, manager of the France national football team which had won the 2018 FIFA World Cup the previous day. Five other stations were also similarly renamed, with Champs-Élysées–Clemenceau (Lines 1 and 13) also in homage to Deschamps ("Deschamps–Élysées–Clemenceau").

In 2019, the station was used by 2,051,828 passengers, making it the 241st busiest of the Métro network out of 302 stations.

In 2020, the station was used by 996,587 passengers amidst the COVID-19 pandemic, making it the 244th busiest of the Métro network out of 304 stations.

In 2021, the station was used by 1,487,256 passengers, making it the 237th busiest of the Métro network out of 304 stations.

== Passenger services ==
=== Access ===
The station has a single access at Place Pierre Lafue, consisting of a staircase and an ascending escalator.

=== Station layout ===
Street Level
B1	Mezzanine
Platform level	Side platform, doors will open on the right
Platform level	Southbound	← toward Mairie d'Issy (Montparnasse – Bienvenüe)
Platform level	Northbound	toward Mairie d'Aubervilliers (Rennes) →
Platform level	Side platform, doors will open on the right

=== Platforms ===
The station has a standard configuration with 2 tracks surrounded by 2 side platforms. The lower portion of the side walls are vertical instead of elliptical, as are the other stations constructed by the Nord-Sud company (today on lines 12 and 13).

=== Other connections ===
The station is also served by lines 58, 68, and 82 of the RATP bus network.

== Nearby ==
- Allée Claude Cahun–Marcel Moore
- Alliance française
- Notre-Dame-des-Champs

== Gallery ==
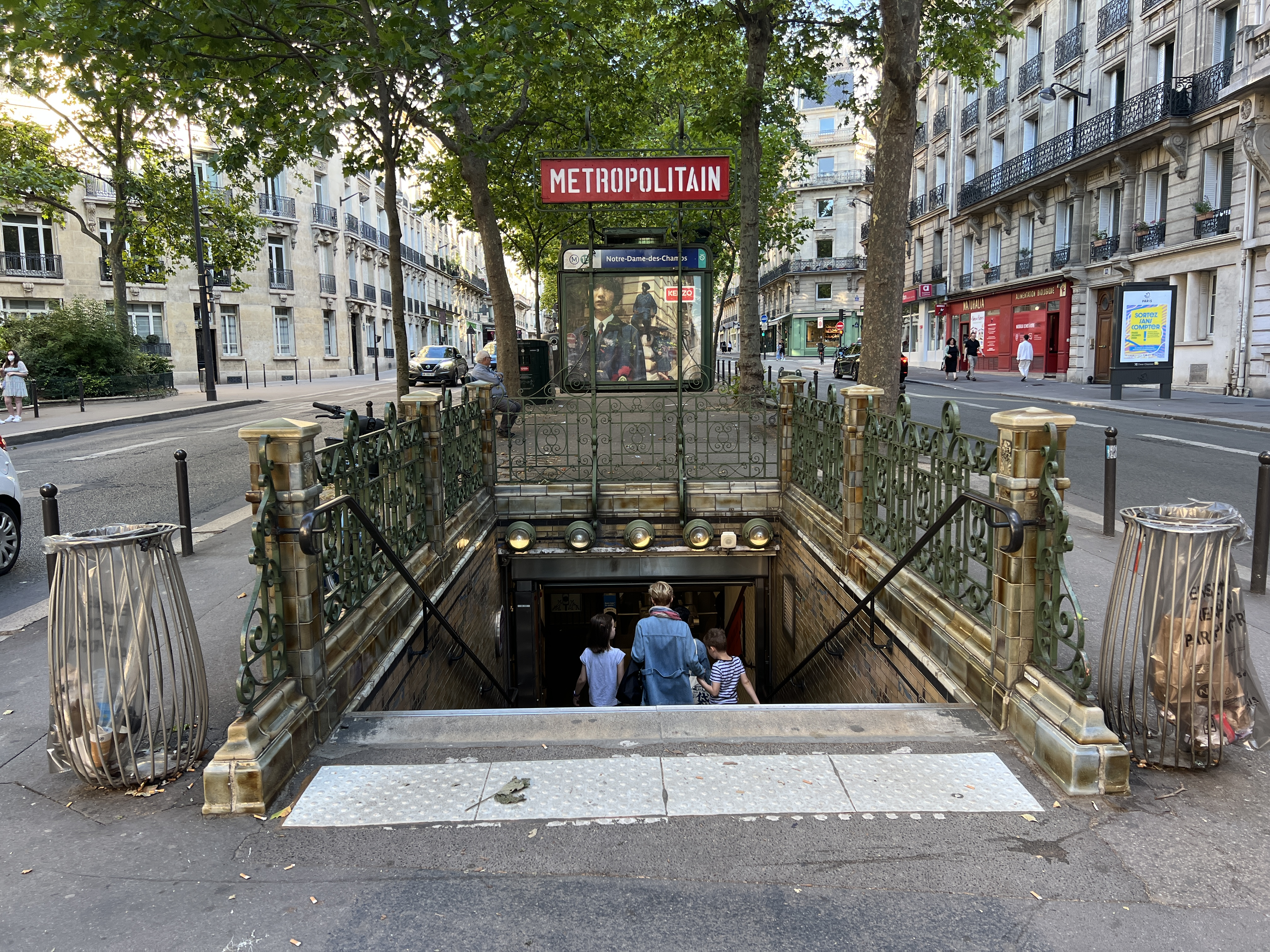
Access along Boulevard Raspail

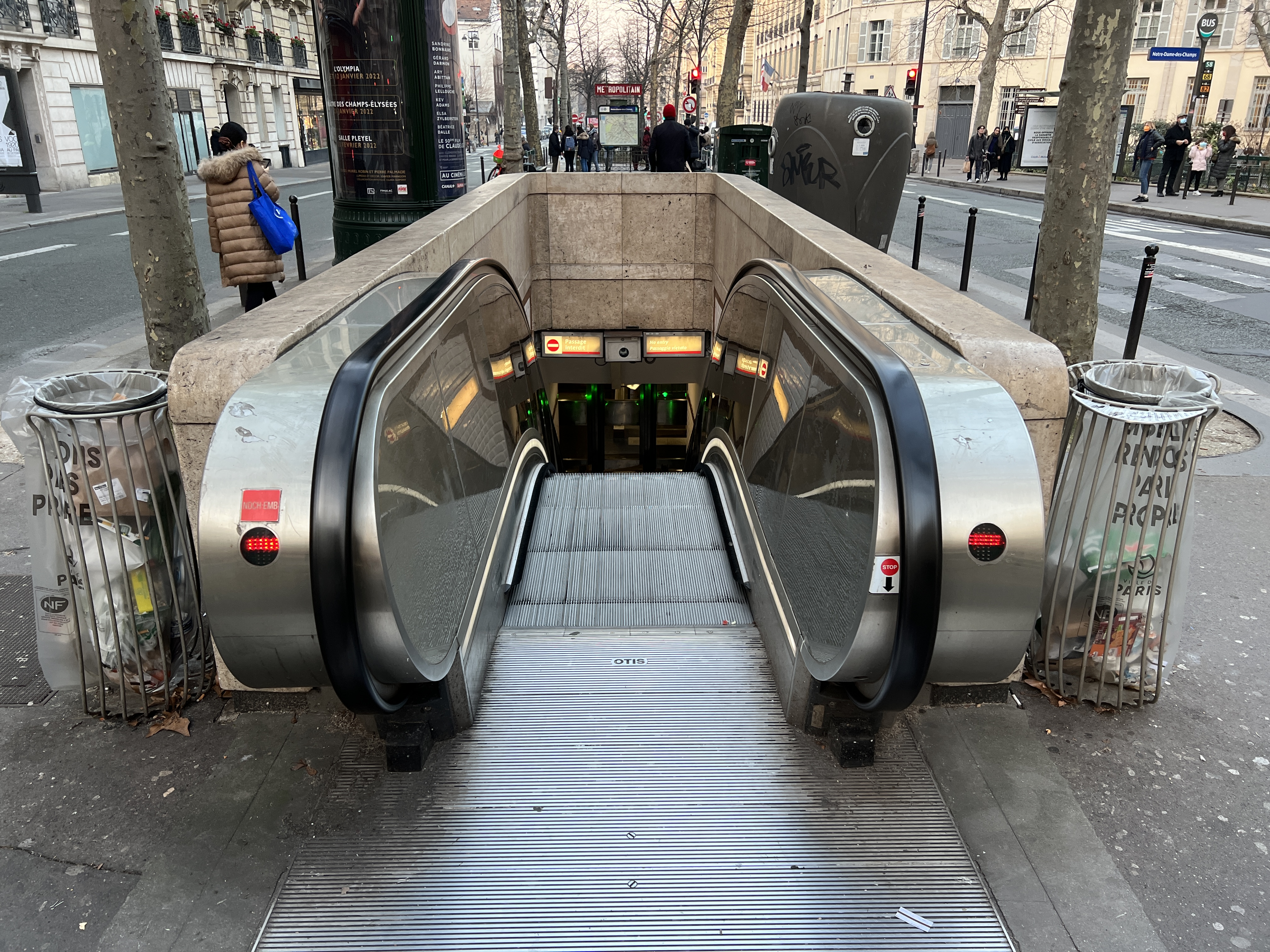
Exit-only escalator
