= Rennes station (Paris Metro) =

Metro station in Paris, France

Rennes
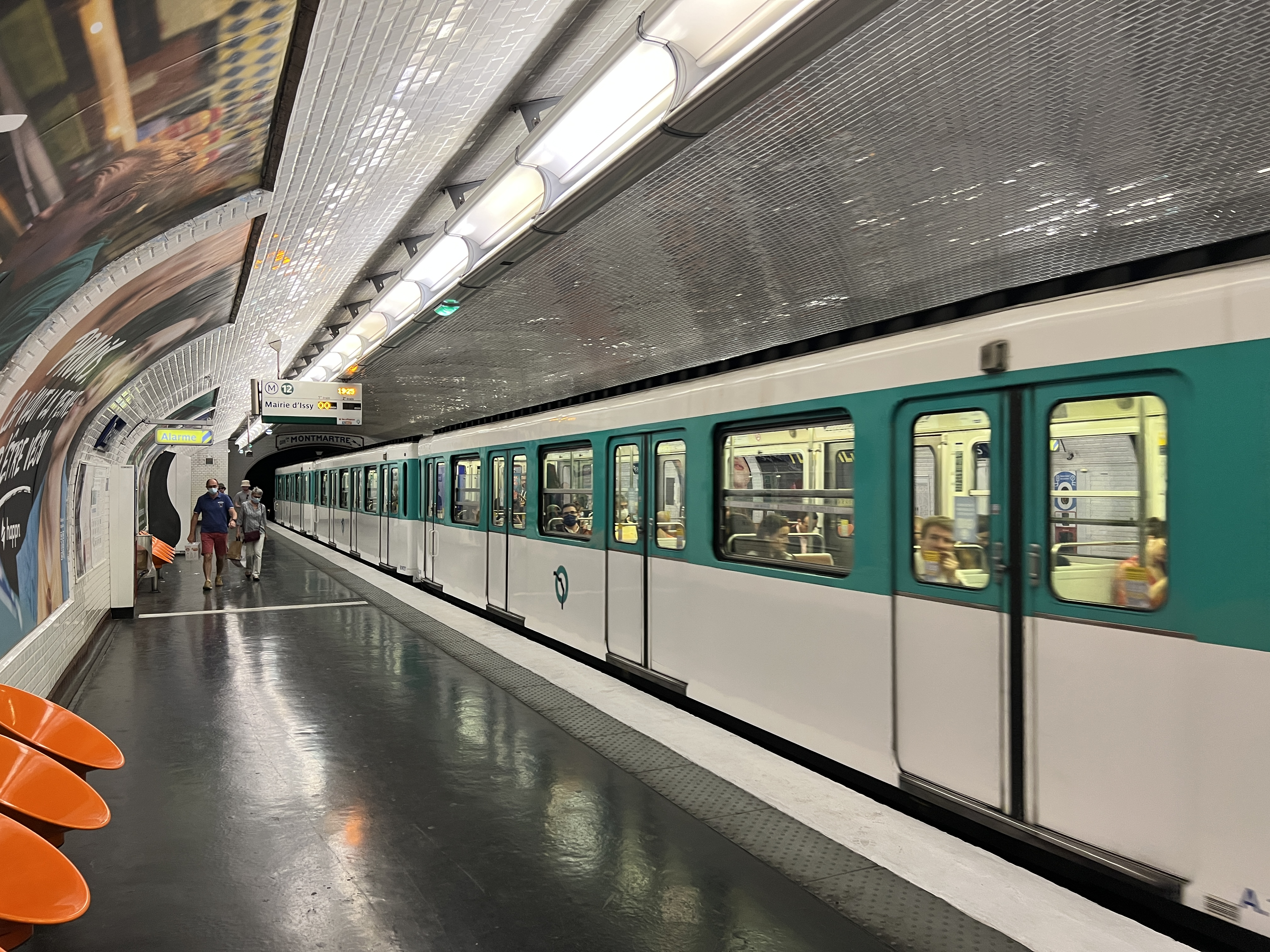
- MF 67 at Rennes

General information
- Location: 6th arrondissement of Paris; Île-de-France; France
- Coordinates: 48°50′53″N 2°19′40″E
- System: Paris Métro station
- Owner: RATP
- Operator: RATP
- Line: Paris Metro Paris Metro Line 12
- Platforms: 2 (side platforms)
- Tracks: 2

Construction
- Accessible: no

Other information
- Station code: 0211
- Fare zone: 1

Key dates
- 5 November 1919: Opened
- 2 September 1939: Closed
- 20 May 1968: Reopened

Passengers
- 861,334 (2021)

Services
Preceding station	Paris Metro	Following station
Notre-Dame-des-Champs towards Mairie d'Issy	Line 12	Sèvres–Babylone towards Mairie d'Aubervilliers
Location
- Location within Paris

Rennes (French pronunciation: [ʁɛn]) is a station on Line 12 of the Paris Métro in the 6th arrondissement.

Located in the heart of the Rive Gauche, Rennes is one of four stations on Line 12 that lie beneath Boulevard Raspail, in this case at its intersection with the Rue de Rennes. It is from this street that it takes its name, which in turn is named after the city of Rennes.

It was one of the stations that were closed in 1939 at the outbreak of World War II; Rennes did not reopen until 1968.

== History ==
The station opened on 5 November 1910 as part of the original section of the Nord-Sud Company's Line A between Porte de Versailles and Notre-Dame-de-Lorette. On 27 March 1931, Line A became Line 12 when It was taken over by its competitor, the Compagnie du chemin de fer métropolitain de Paris (CMP), incorporating it into the Paris Métro.

On 2 September 1939, the day prior France joining World War II, the station was closed as part of the government's plan that reduced service on the Métro network as a cost-saving measure in light of the onset of the war, with all but 85 stations closed. Most reopened after the war, although some of them, including Rennes, remained closed due to their light traffic, hence becoming a ghost station. For a period of time while it was closed, it was used to experiment with advertising schemes which could be viewed from passing trains.

On 20 May 1968, after 29 years of closure and amid May 68, the station was finally reopened, albeit with limited operating hours as a cost saving measure. It was closed after 8pm from Monday to Saturday, and was closed all day on Sundays and public holidays. The walls of the station were coated with a white layer of paint due to the lack of maintenance causing the tiles on the walls to deteriorate.

In 2002, it was reported that the station had 4,400 "incoming" commuters per day.

This arrangement lasted until 7 September 2004, when it was adjusted to the standard operating hours of most other stations at the local residents' request. This was due to changes in commuting patterns, where more commuters returned home later in the evening in addition to high traffic to Marché Raspail, a traditional market nearby, on Sundays. Only Liège on Line 13 retained limited operating hours, until 4 December 2006.

As part of the "Un métro + beau" programme by the RATP, the station was renovated and modernised on 7 October 2008.

In 2019, the station was used by 1,181,641 passengers, making it the 287th busiest of the Métro network out of 302 stations.

In 2020, the station was used by 506,779 passengers amidst the COVID-19 pandemic, making it the 291st busiest of the Métro network out of 304 stations.

In 2021, the station was used by 861,334 passengers, making it the 287th busiest of the Métro network out of 304 stations.

== Passenger services ==
=== Access ===
The station has two accesses:

- Access 1: rue de Renne
- Access 2: Boulevard Raspail (exit only)

=== Station layout ===
Street Level
B1	Mezzanine
Platform level	Side platform, doors will open on the right
Platform level	Southbound	← toward Mairie d'Issy (Notre-Dame-des-Champs)
Platform level	Northbound	toward Mairie d'Aubervilliers (Sèvres – Babylone) →
Platform level	Side platform, doors will open on the right

=== Platforms ===
The station has a standard configuration with 2 tracks surrounded by 2 side platforms. The lower portion of the side walls are vertical instead of elliptical, as were the other stations constructed by the Nord-Sud company (today on lines 12 and 13).

=== Other connections ===
The station is also served by lines 39, 68, 89, 94, 95, and 96 of the RATP bus network, and at night, by lines N01, N02, N12, and N13 of the Noctilien bus network.

== Gallery ==
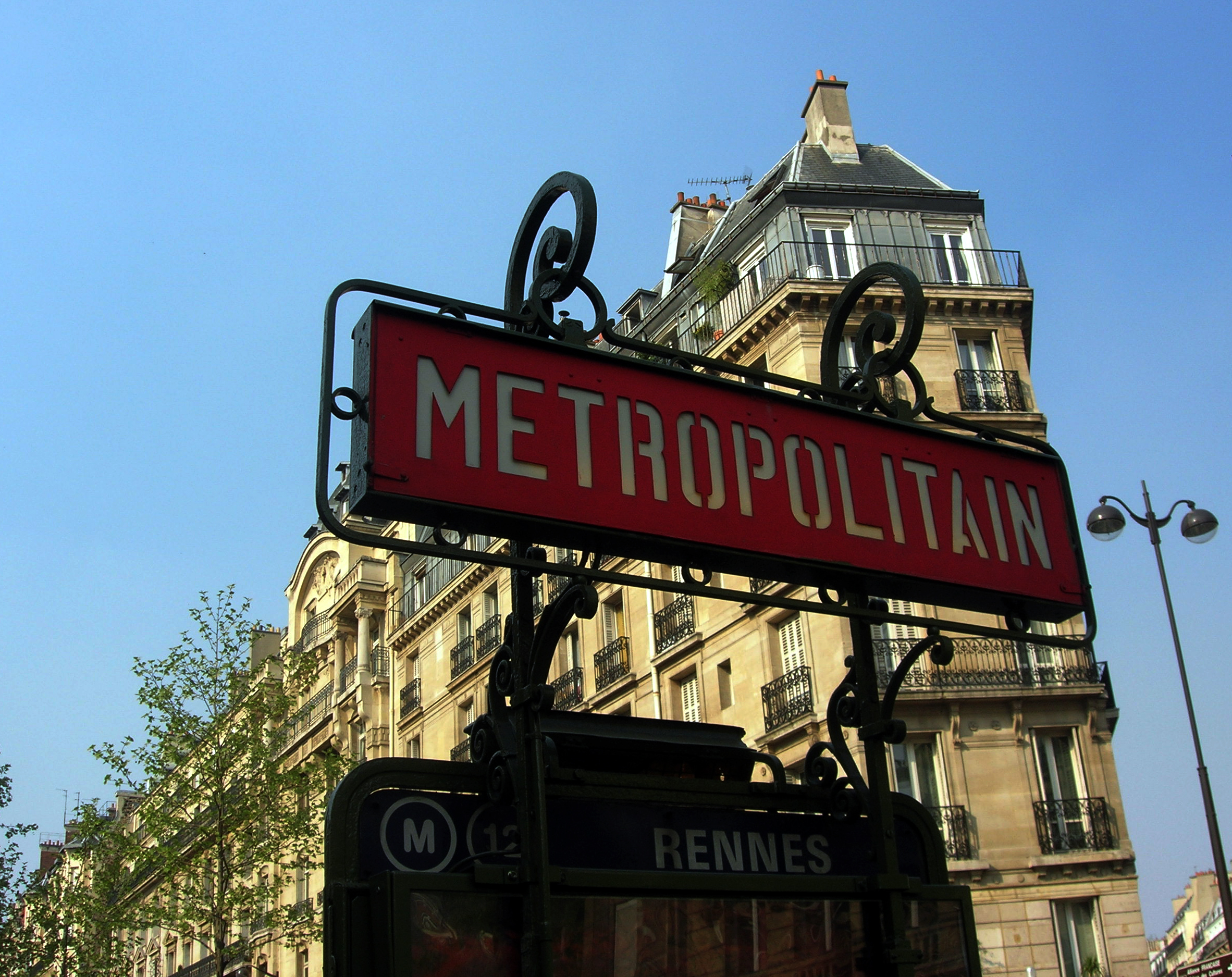
Signage

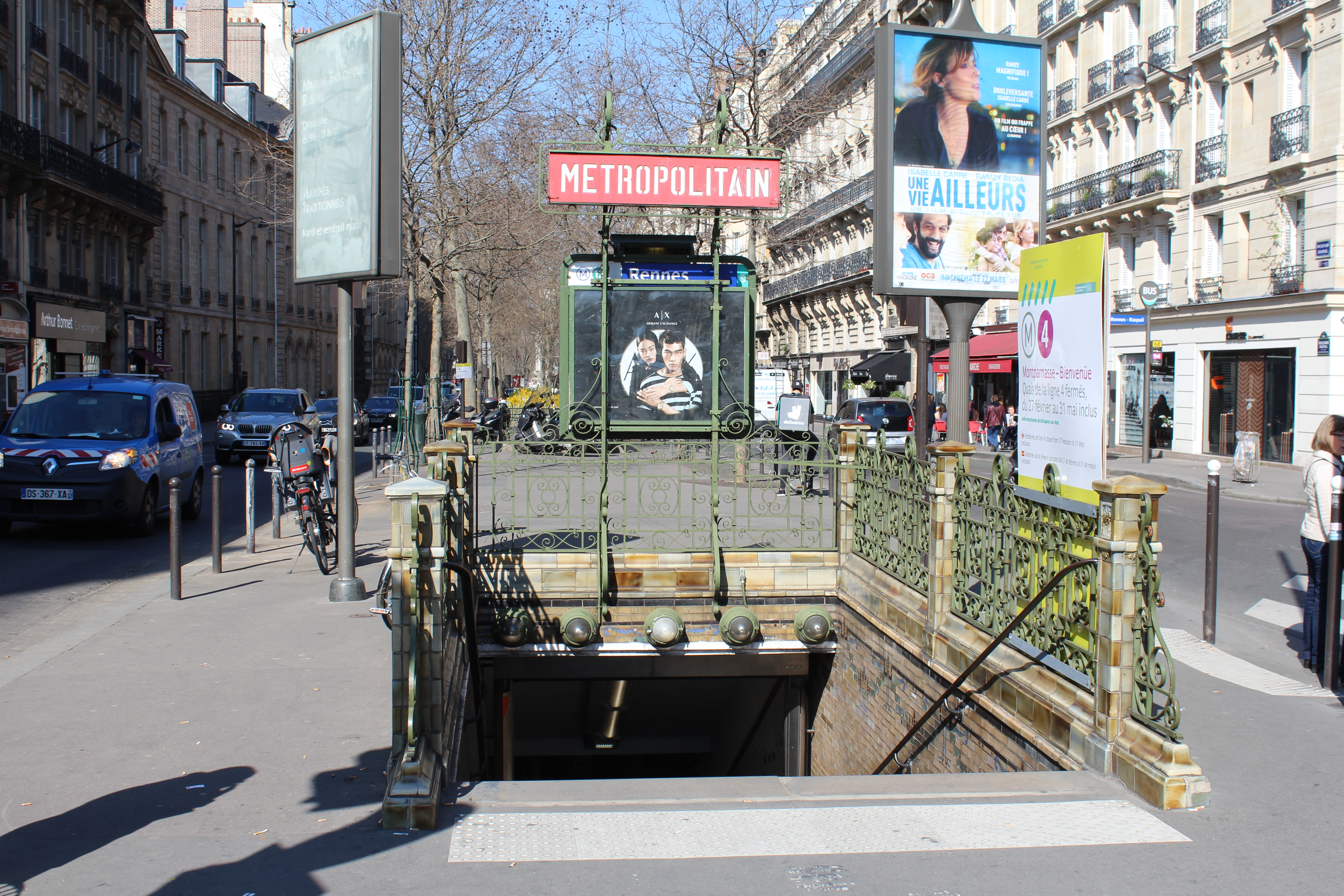
Access 1

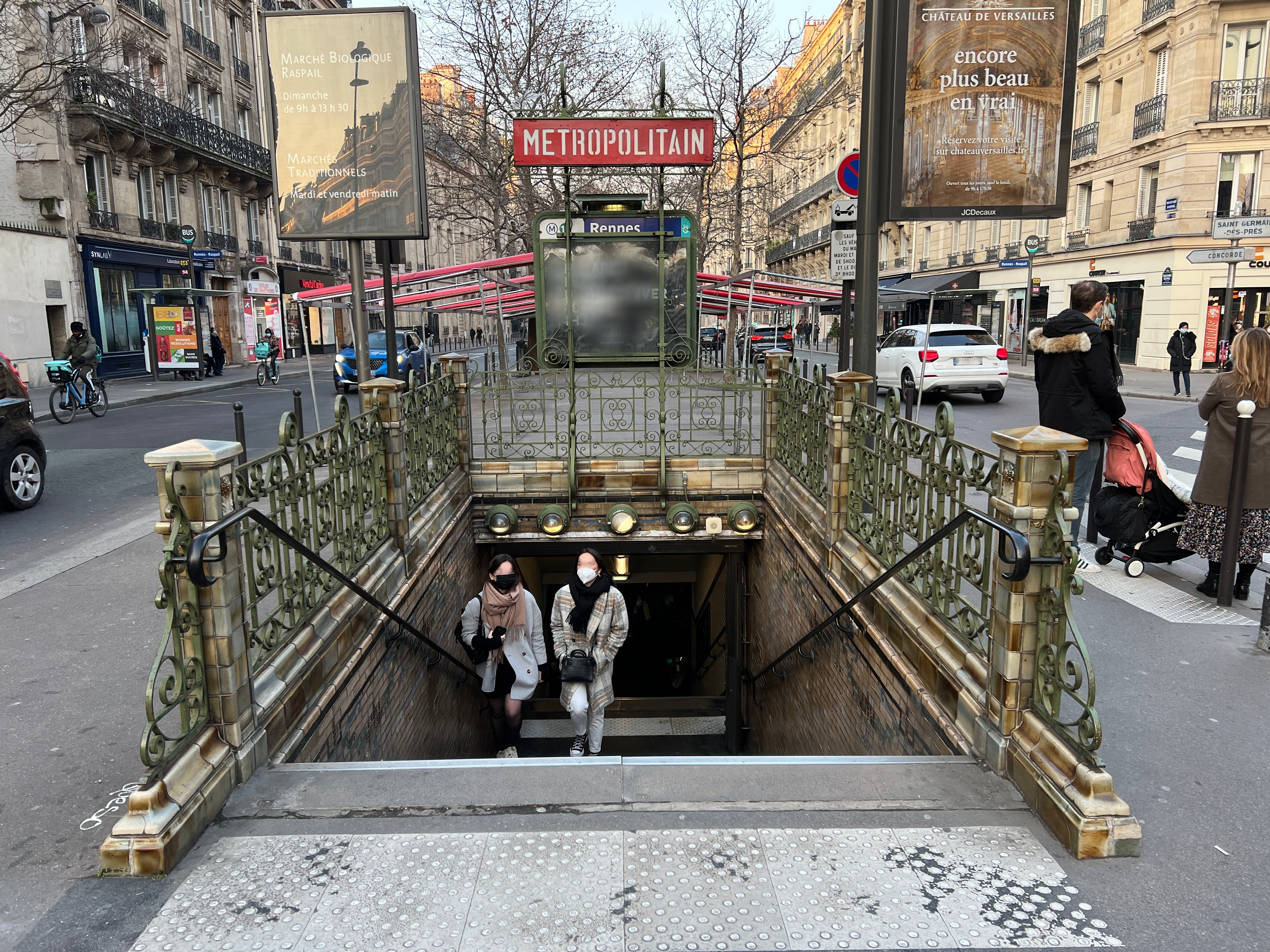
Access 2

== Nearby ==
- Marché Raspail
