= Our Lady of the Fields =

- Madonna dei Campi
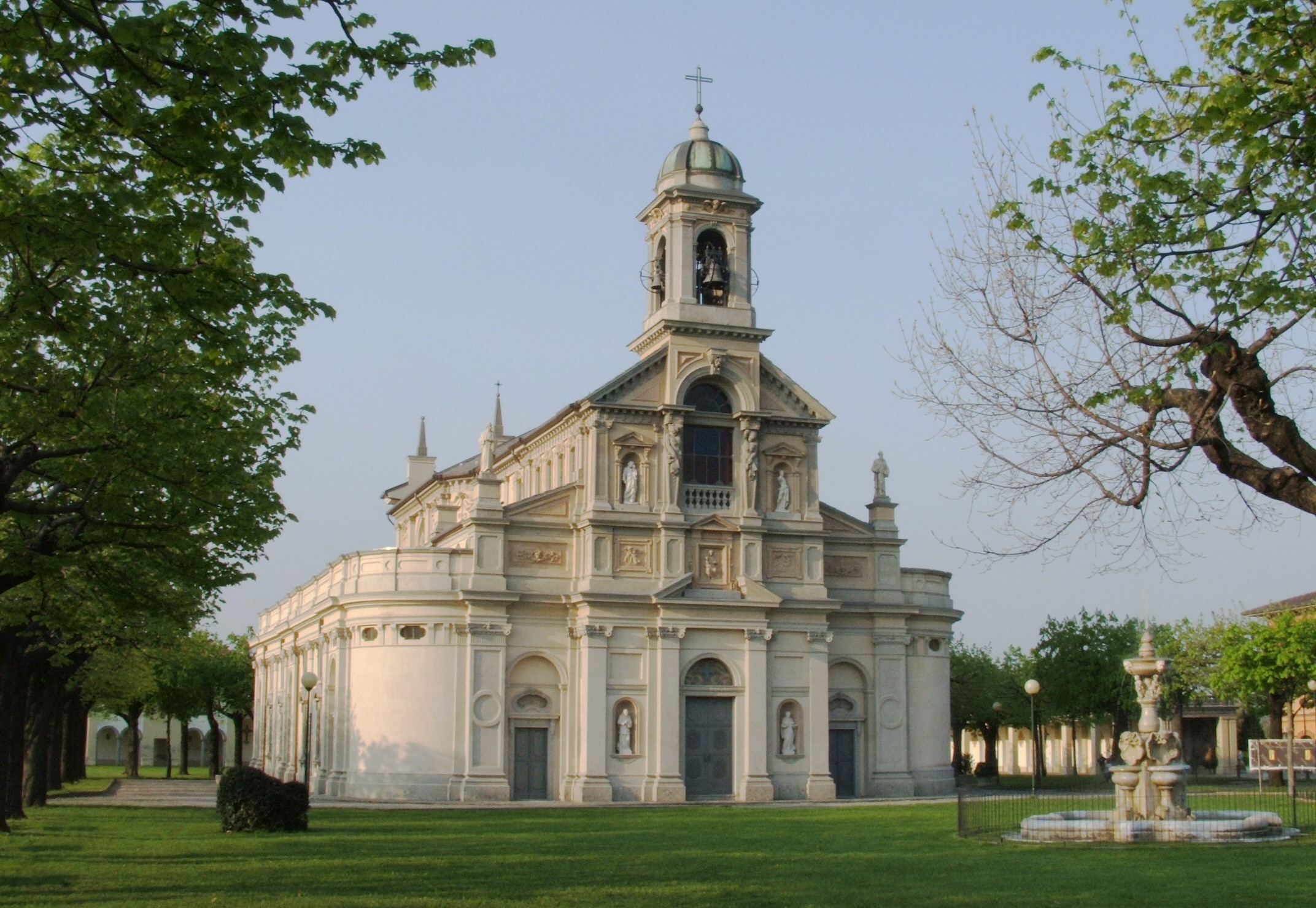
- The sanctuary of the Madonna dei Campi at Stezzano (2006 photograph)
- Location: Stezzano, near Bergamo
- Country: Italy
- Denomination: Roman Catholic

Our Lady of the Fields (Italian: Madonna dei Campi; French: Notre Dame des Champs; Spanish: La Virgen del Campo; also known as Our Lady of Prayer) is a title of Mary mother of Jesus in Roman Catholic Marian veneration. The name is based on a sanctuary in the countryside of Stezzano, near Bergamo, where Marian apparitions have been recorded since the 13th century.

Veneration of Mary under this name was taken to Canada by Jesuit Xavier Donald Macleod, who reports a Marian apparition in a village of New France in 1841.

Mary is venerated under this name by the Glenmary Home Missioners, a Catholic society of priests and brothers that serve the rural United States.

== See also ==
- Notre-Dame-des-Champs, Paris
- Notre-Dame-des-Champs (Paris Métro)
- Madonna di Campiglio
- Brothers of Our Lady of the Fields
