= Joseph Aubert =

French painter

Joseph-Jean-Felix Aubert
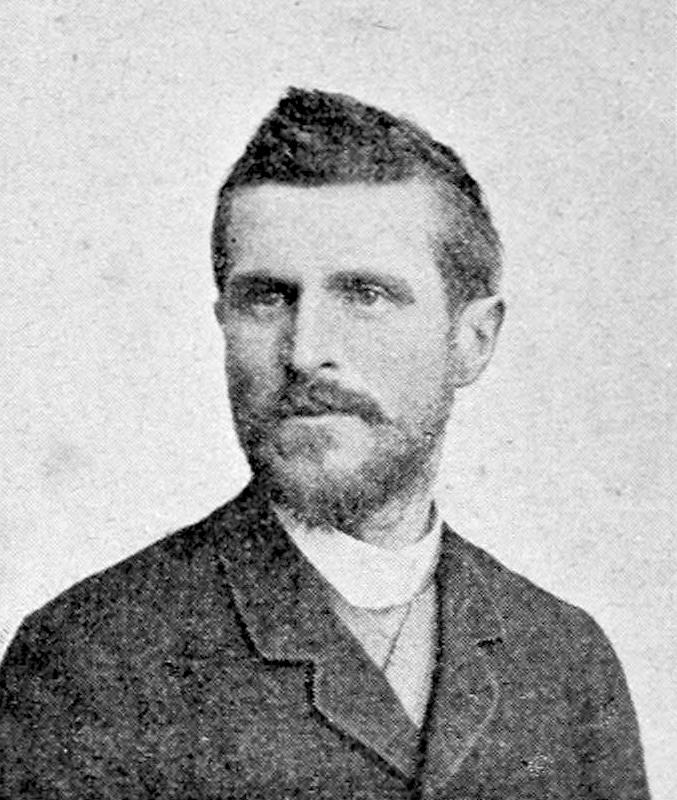
- Joseph Aubert by César
- Born: 20 August 1849; Nantes, France
- Died: 23 May 1924 (aged 74); Saint-André-d'Ornay, France
- Known for: Painting

Joseph-Jean-Felix Aubert (20 August 1849 – 23 May 1924) was a French artistic painter.

== Biography ==
Joseph Aubert married the daughter of the mathematician Jean Claude Bouquet in 1872. In 1873, he was admitted to the Ecole des Beaux-Arts in Paris in the studio of Alexandre Cabanel. He specialized in religious painting and stained glass design.

He notably decorated frescoes of the churches Notre-Dame des Champs in Paris and Notre-Dame de Besançon.

== Gallery ==
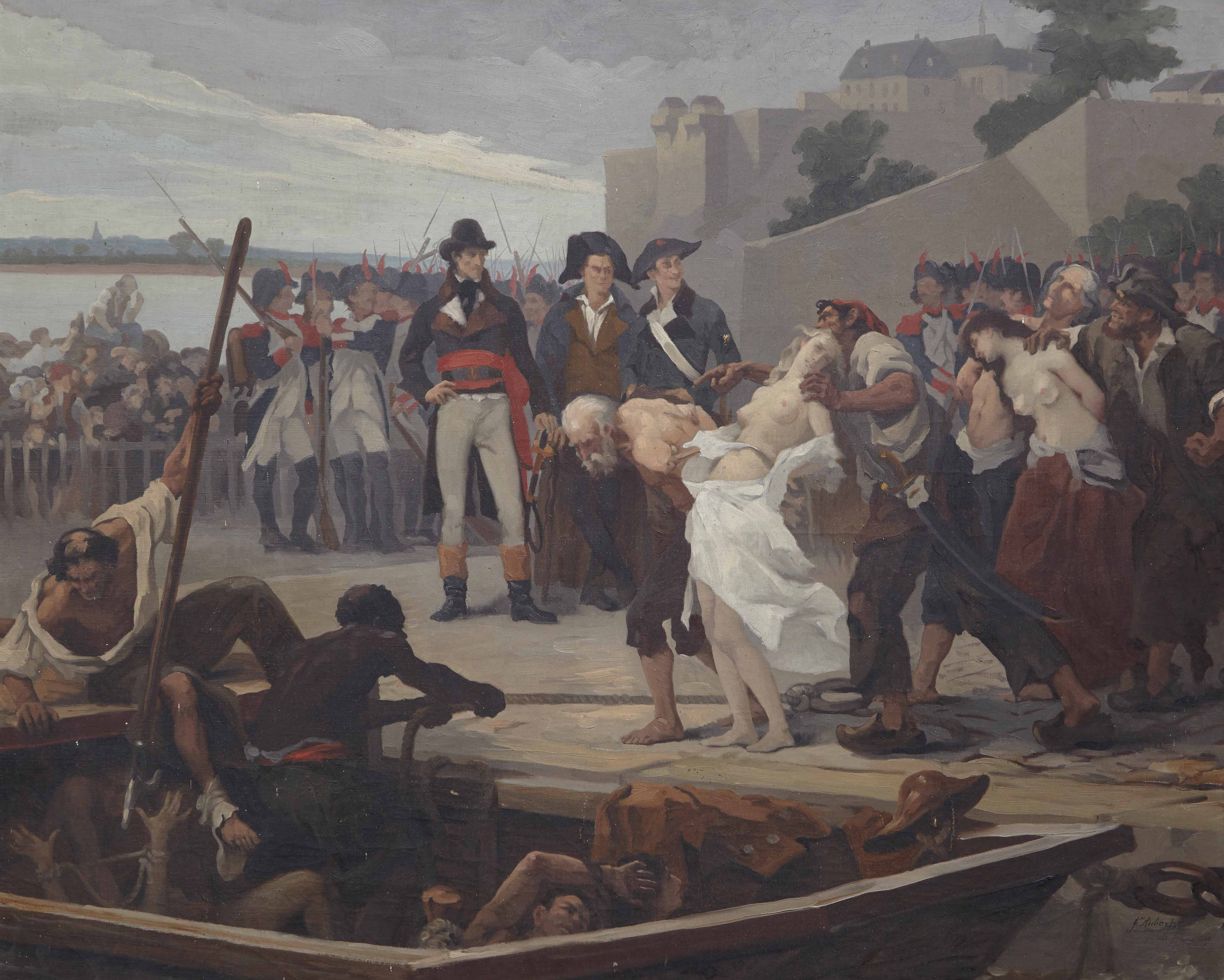

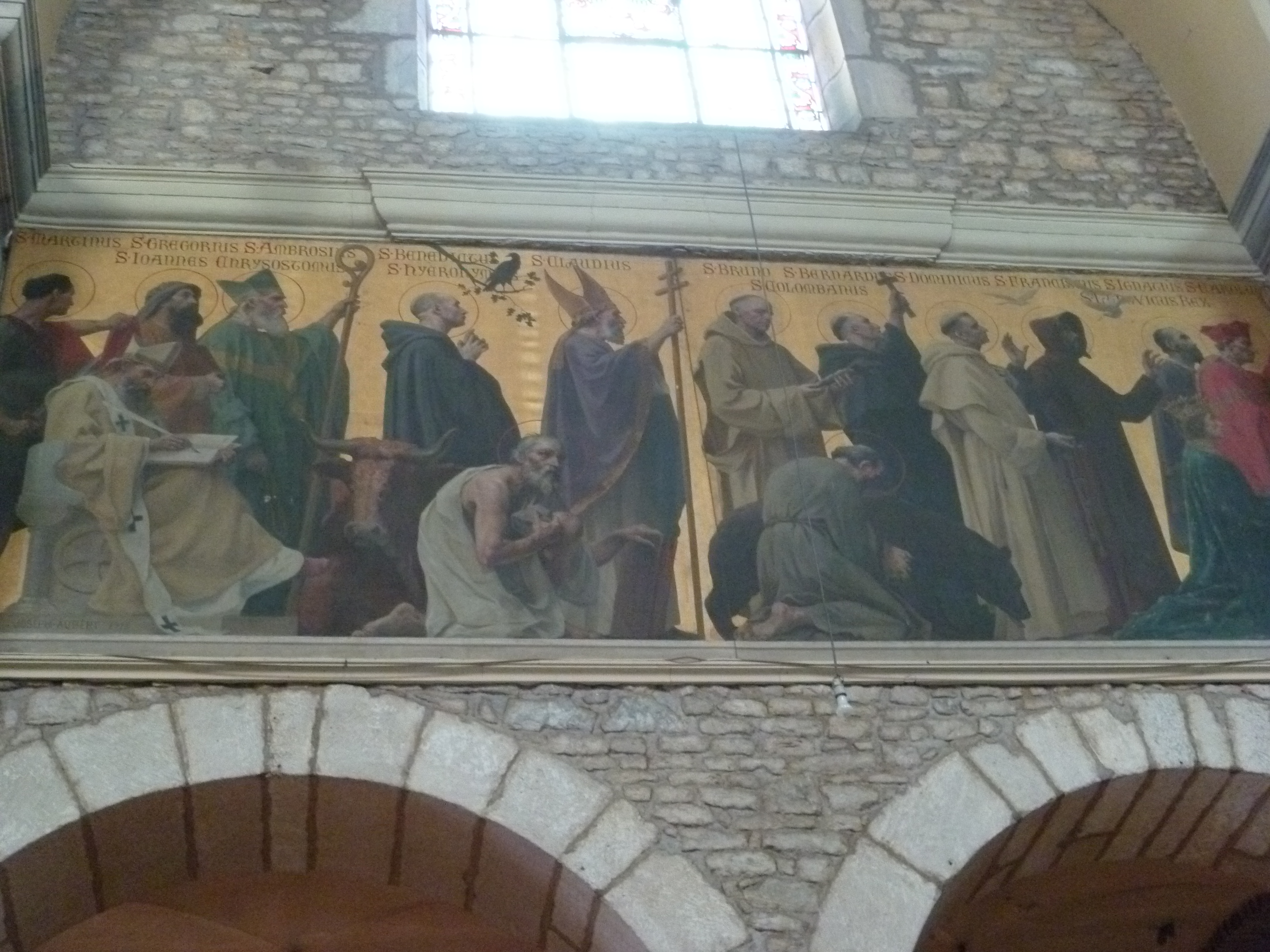
