= Notre-Dame-des-Champs, Paris =

Catholic church in Paris

Notre-Dame-des-Champs
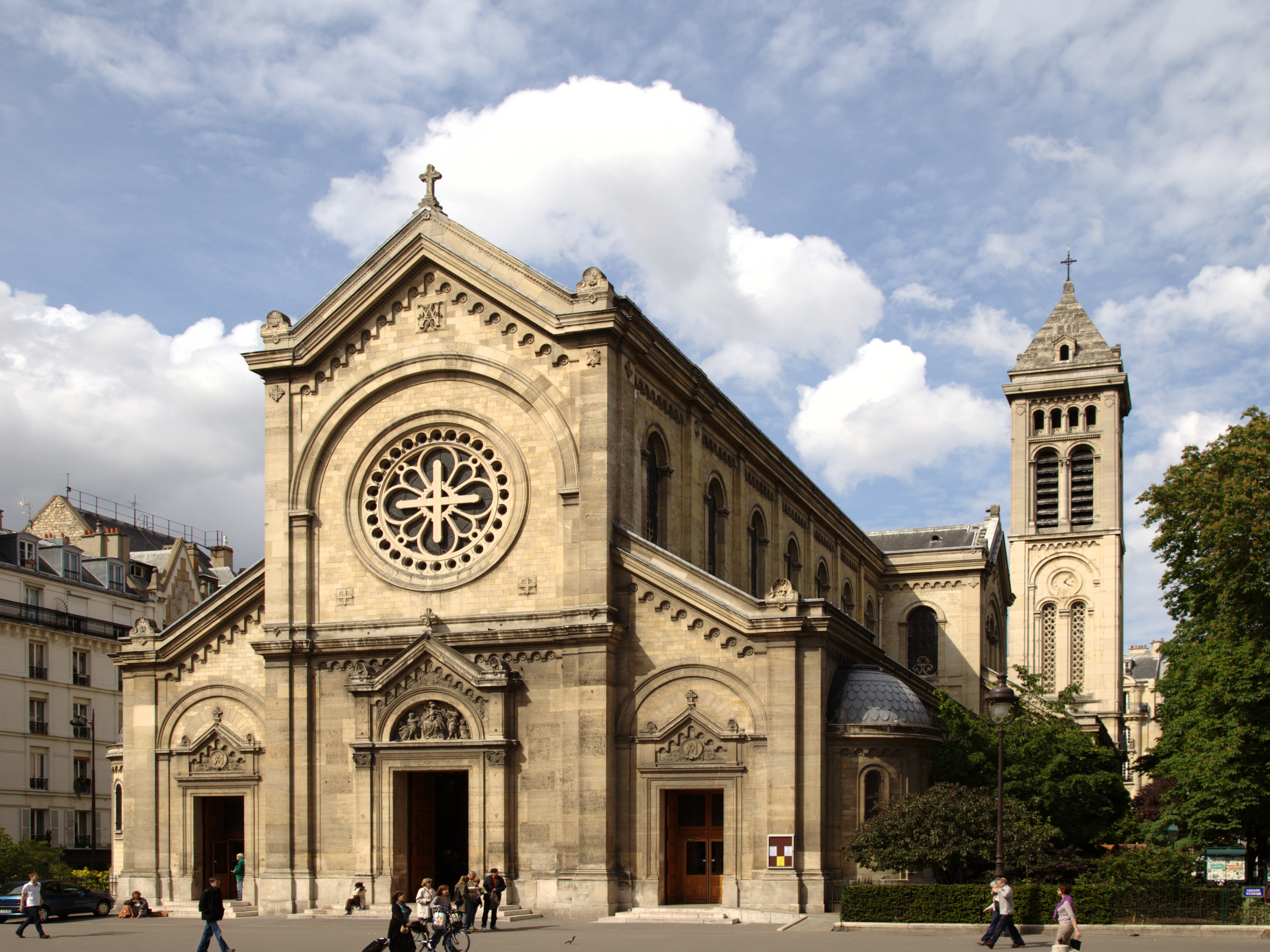
- Notre-Dame-des-Champs in 2012

Religion
- Affiliation: Roman Catholic Church
- Diocese: Roman Catholic Archdiocese of Paris
- Region: Île-de-France
- Rite: Latin Rite
- Status: Active

Location
- Location: 6th arrondissement, Paris, France
- Interactive map of Notre-Dame-des-Champs
- Coordinates: 48°50′37″N 2°19′38″E

Architecture
- Architect: Gustave Eiffel
- Style: Romanesque
- Groundbreaking: 1867
- Completed: 1876

Website
- notredamedeschamps.fr

Notre-Dame-des-Champs is a Catholic church located at 91 Boulevard du Montparnasse, at the southern edge of the 6th arrondissement of Paris. The church is named after the Blessed Virgin Mary, under the title of Our Lady of the Fields. It was completed in 1876, built using an iron framework designed by Gustave Eiffel.

== History ==
Originally located on the site of the church was a Roman temple dedicated to the god Mercury. After the Christianization of France, the temple was dedicated to the Blessed Virgin Mary and was named Notre-Dame-des-Vignes. Robert II made additions to the church and rededicated it to both the Virgin Mary and Saint Denis. The church was later made into a priory by the Benedictine monks of Marmoutier Abbey, renaming it Notre-Dame-des-Champs in honor of Our Lady of the Fields.

In 1604 the Benedictines ceded the priory to Princess Catherine Gonzaga, Duchess of Orleans-Longueville who installed Carmelites from Spain. This was the Carmelite convent where both Louise de La Vallière and Françoise-Athénaïs de Rochechouart, Marquise de Montespan both retired from the French court and entered religious life.

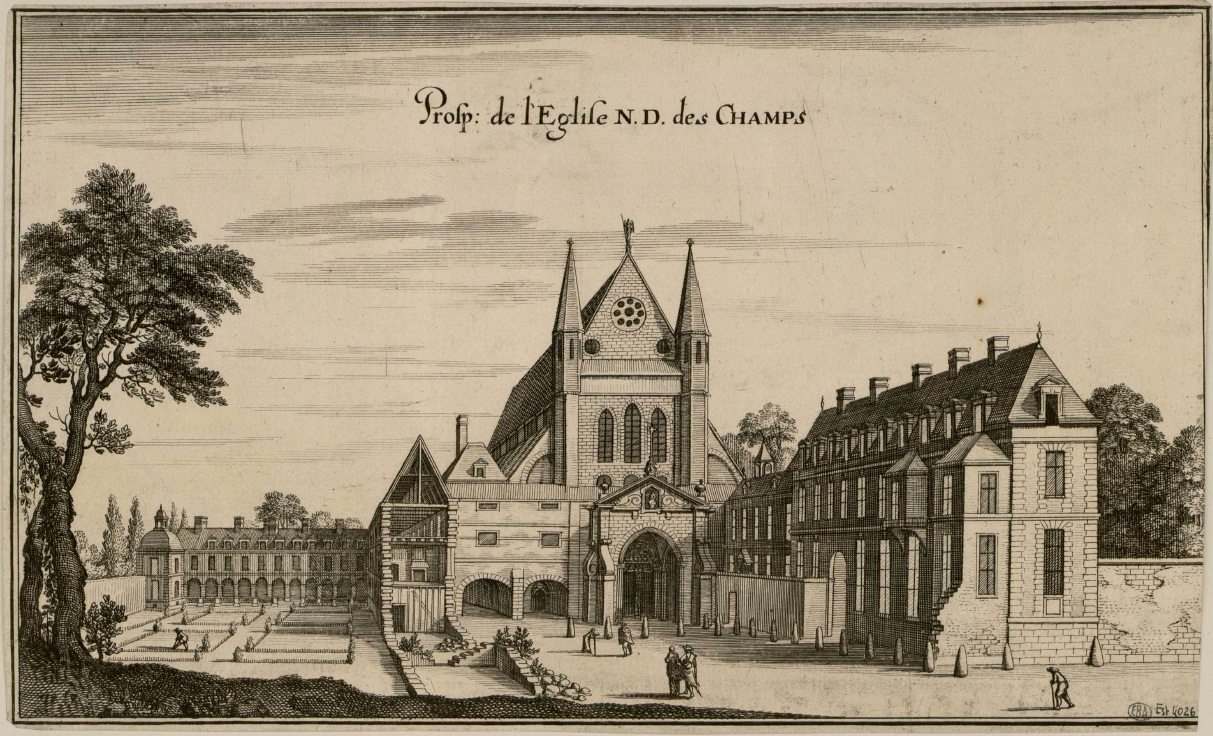
The first convent church, destroyed during the French Revolution

During the French Revolution the convent was closed and the church destroyed. In 1802 the Carmelite Order bought back a small portion of the estate. A small chapel dedicated to Notre-Dame-des-Champs was built, along with a new cloister and living quarters. The order left in 1906.

In 1858 a temporary wooden chapel was built as a neighborhood parish. The current structure was built by the architects Paul-René-Léon Ginain Eugène Bonté, and Léon Ginain, on an iron frame designed by the engineer Gustave Eiffel. The foundation stone was laid on 17 March 1867. The stone came from quarries in Châtillon, Hauts-de-Seine.

The iron framework created for the church by Gustave Eiffel was Eiffel's first church structure, and predated his work on the Eiffel Tower by twenty years. It permitted the church to have greater height, fewer supporting columns and larger windows.

After being interrupted by the Franco-Prussian War in 1870, the completed church was blessed on 31 October 1876. On 25 March 1912 the church was consecrated by Archbishop Léon-Adolphe Amette of Paris.

== Exterior ==
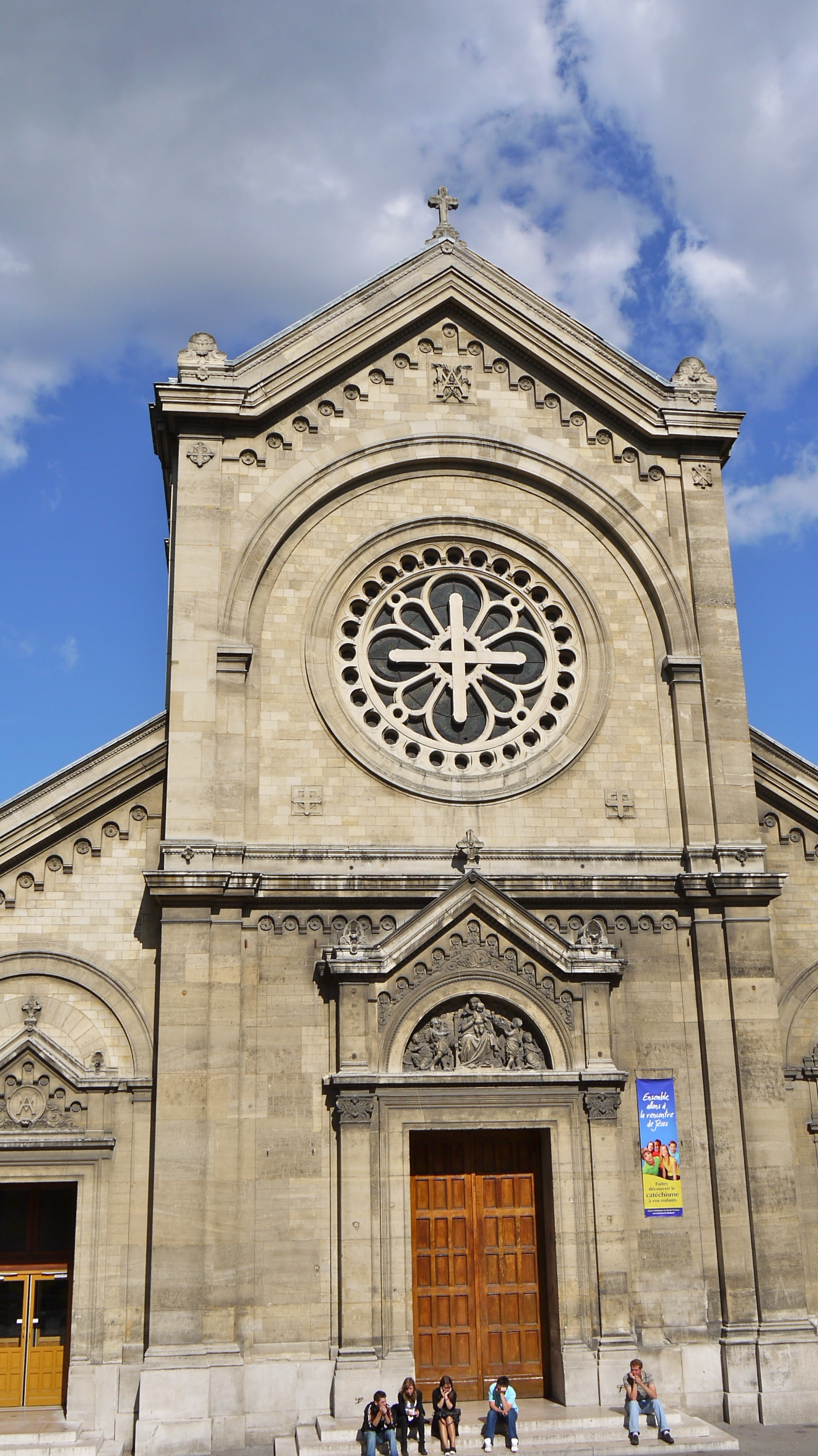
The portal onto Boulevard du Montparnasse

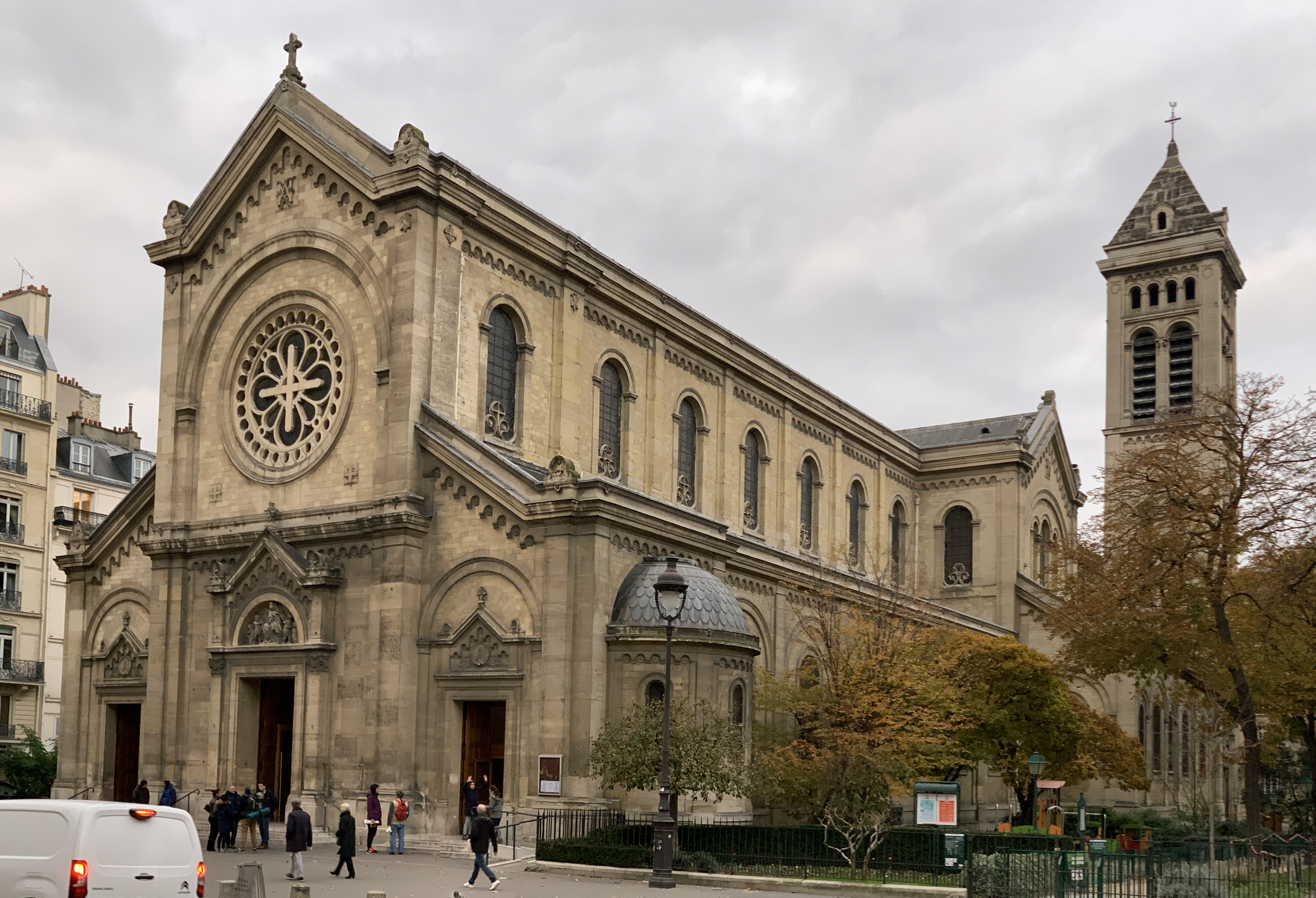
Portal, nave and bell tower

The design of the exterior was inspired by Romanesque architecture, with classical columns and decoration. The tympanum over the central portal, facing Boulevard du Montparnasse, is decorated with bas-relief depicting the Virgin Mary and the Infant Christ, sculpted by Gabriel-Jules Thomas (1824-1904). It was completed in 1863. Other works by Thomas are found in the Cour-Carré of the Louvre Museum and his statue of "Frankfurt" made for the facade of the Musée d'Orsay, when it was a railway station.

== Interior ==
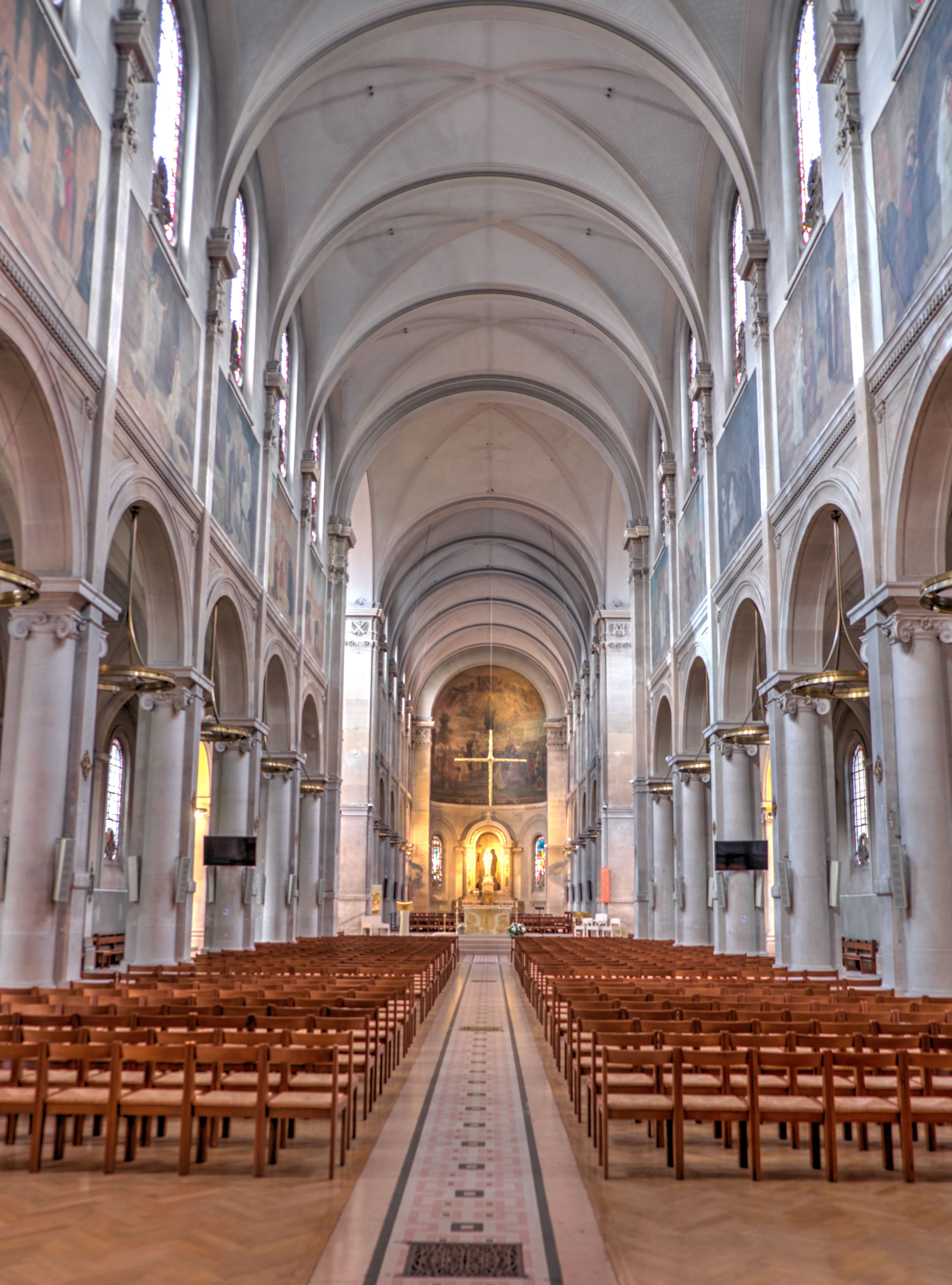
The nave

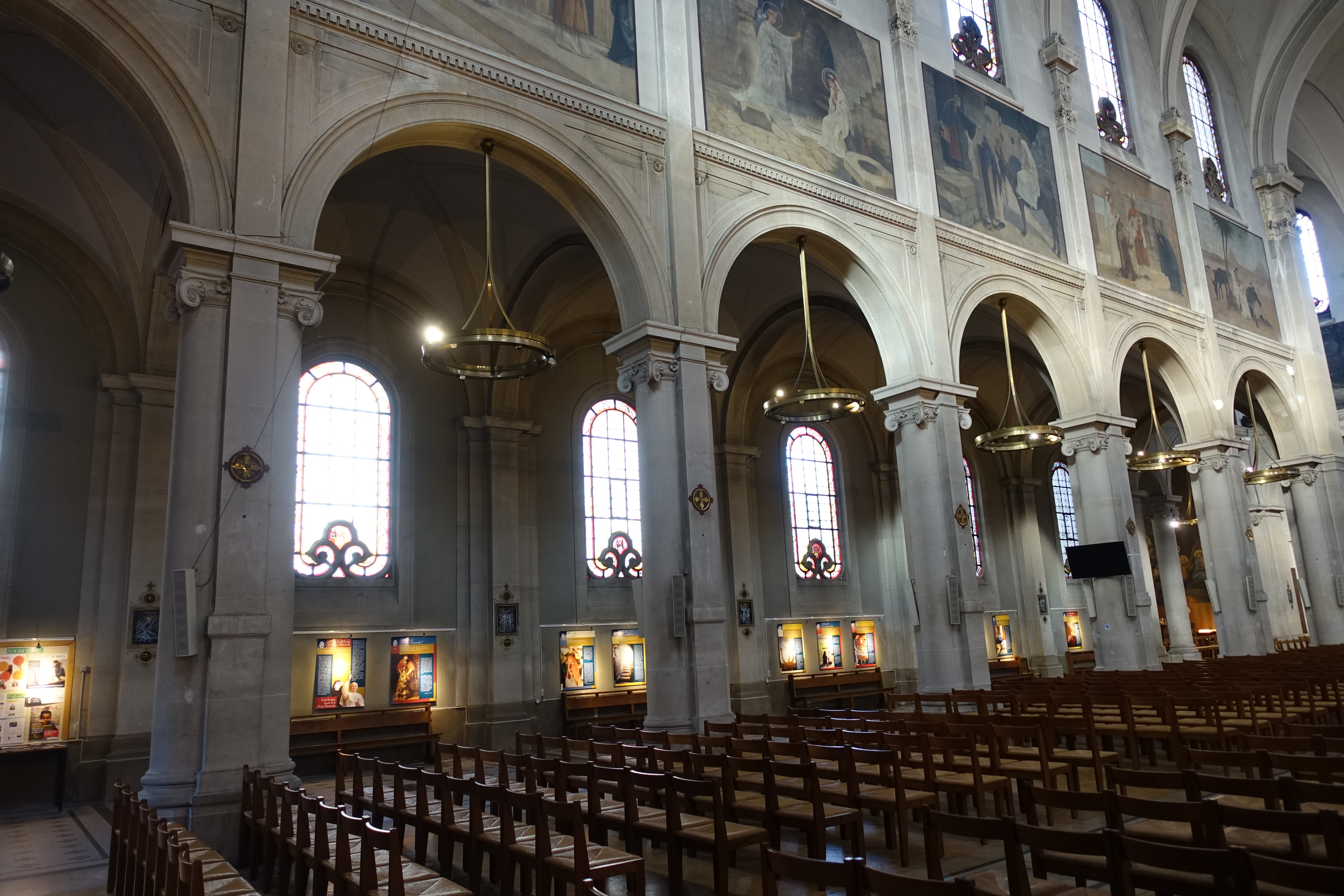
Arcades and collateral aisle in the nave

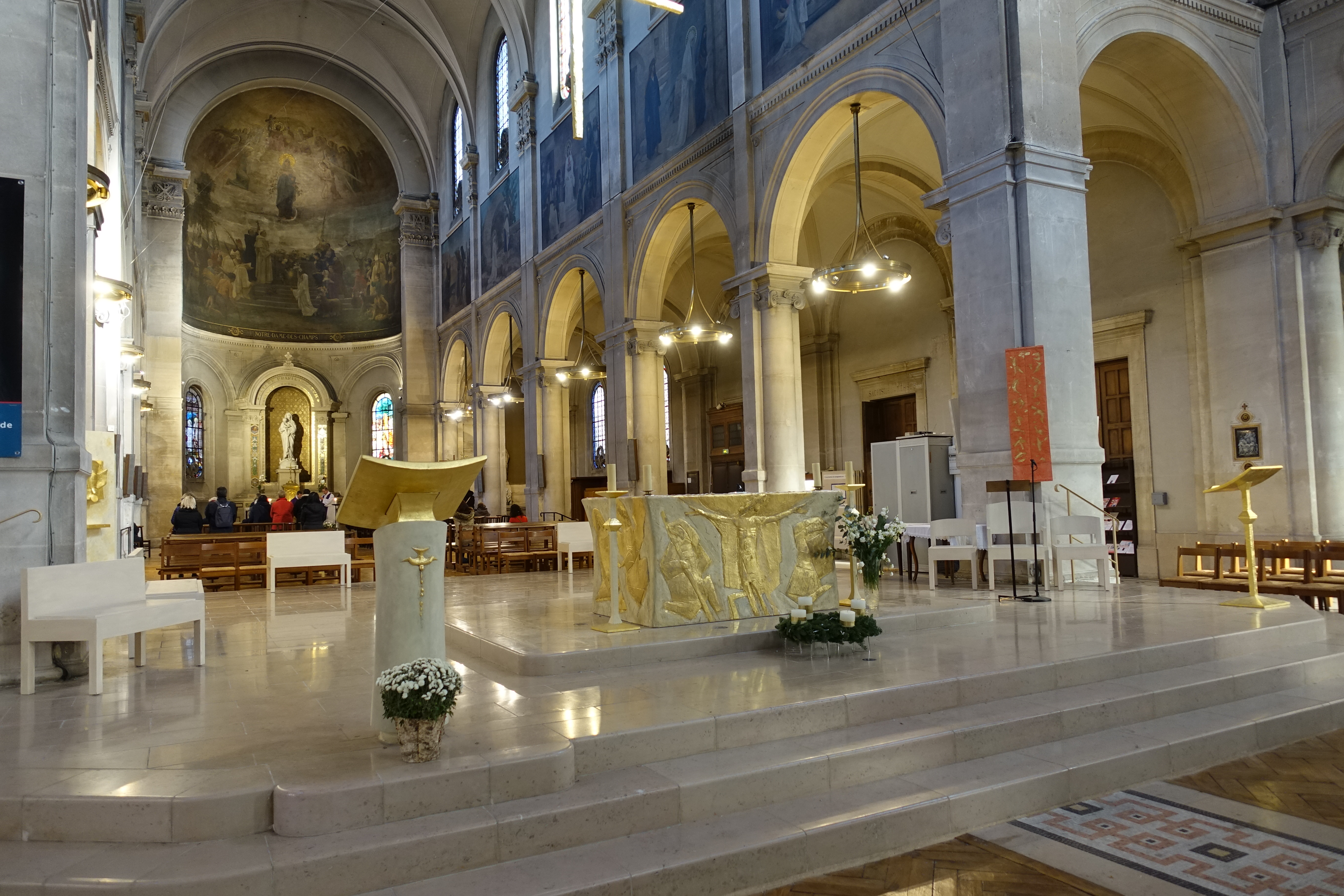
The altar and choir

The plan of the church was also freely inspired by Romanesque architecture. Eiffel's iron frame permitted the church to be higher and to have greater interior space than earlier churches.

The nave is linked on either side by rows of cruciform pillars, supporting the rounded arches of the arcade. The columns are decorated with classical capitals of the ionic order, and continue upwards to support the rounded double arches of the vault. the walls of the nave and choir have rows of large windows on the lower and second level, which fill the church with abundant light.

== Art and decoration ==
=== Paintings ===
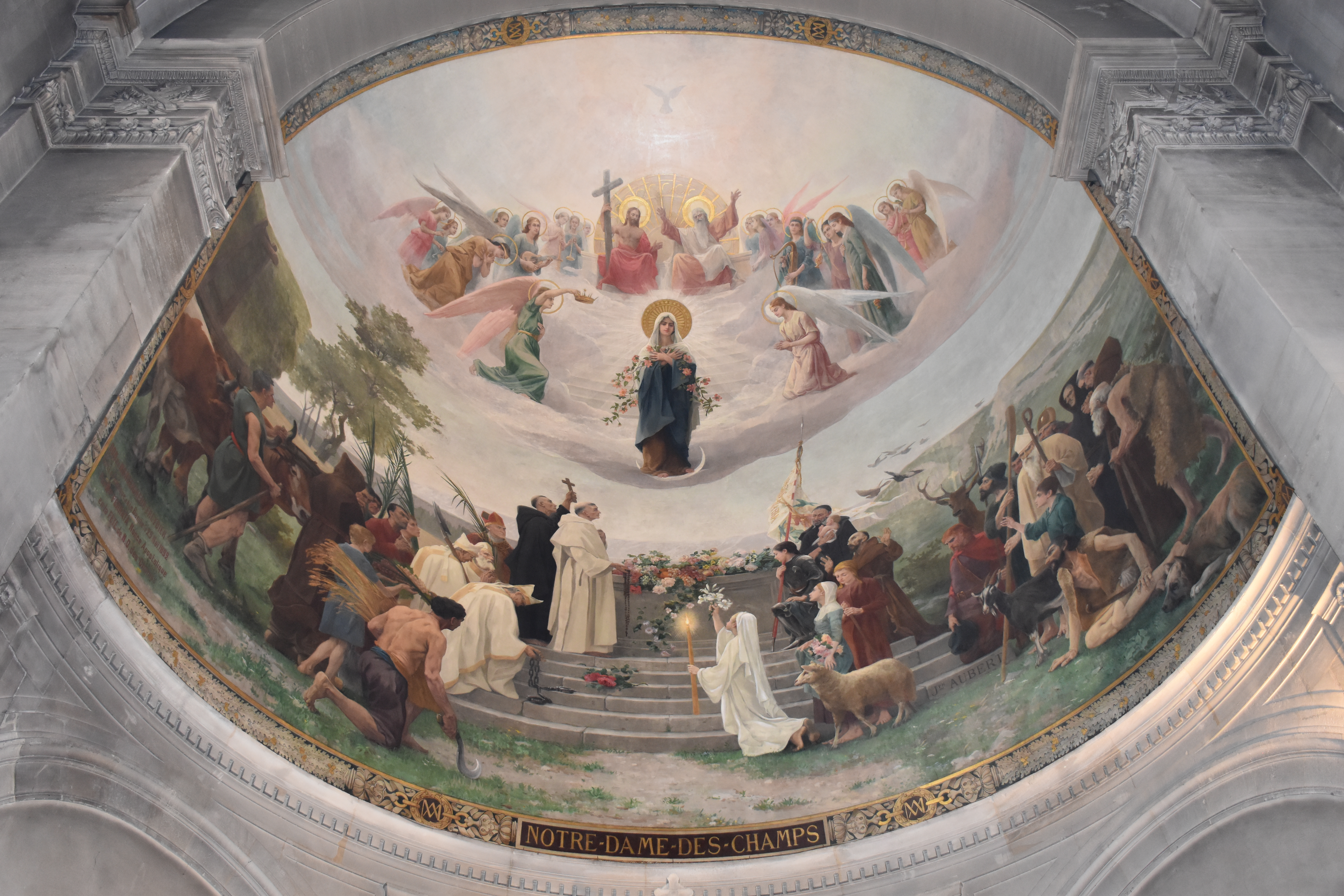
"Life of the Virgin" by Joseph Aubert over the choir)

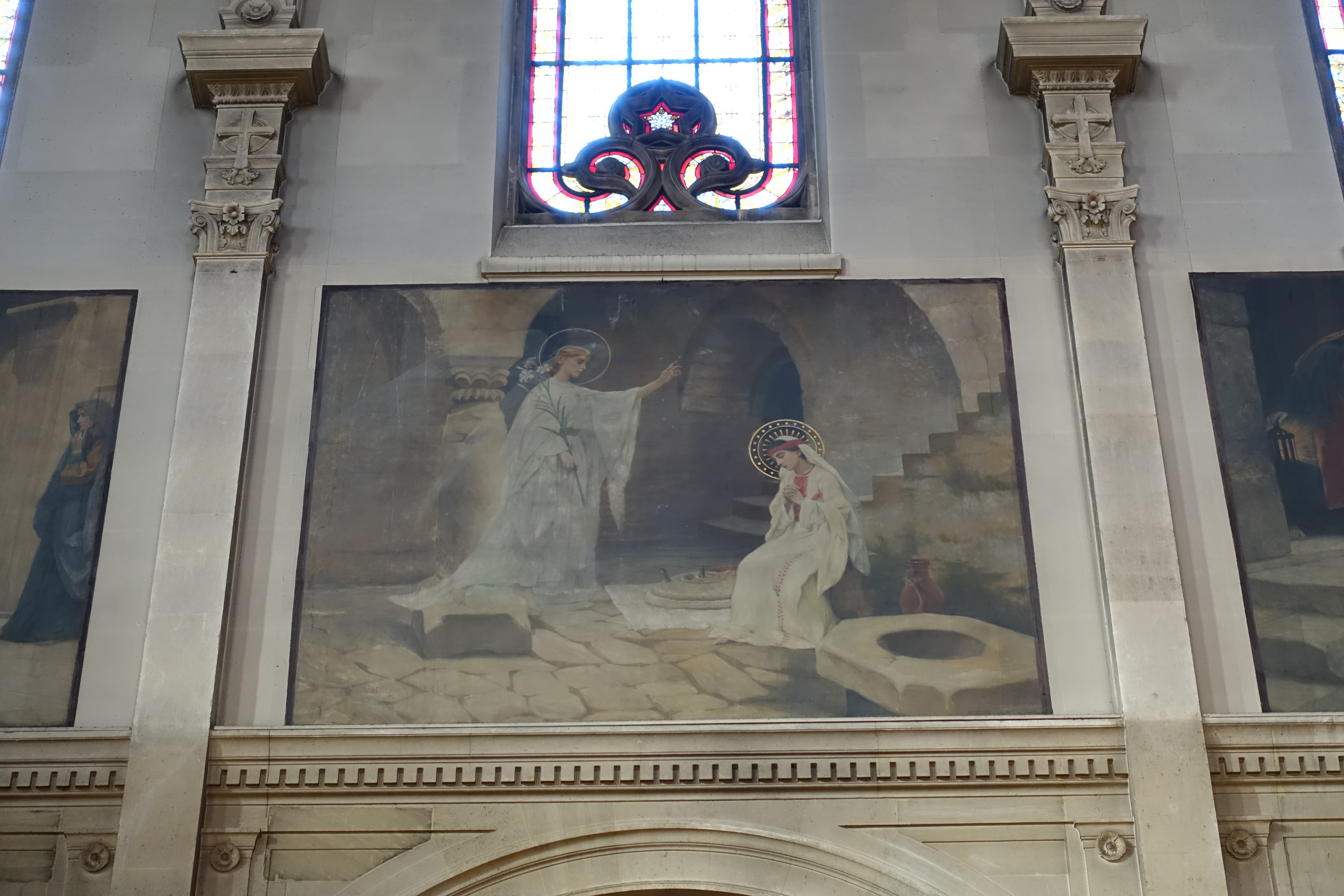
Scene from the Life of the Virgin Mary, by Joseph Aubert (Nave)

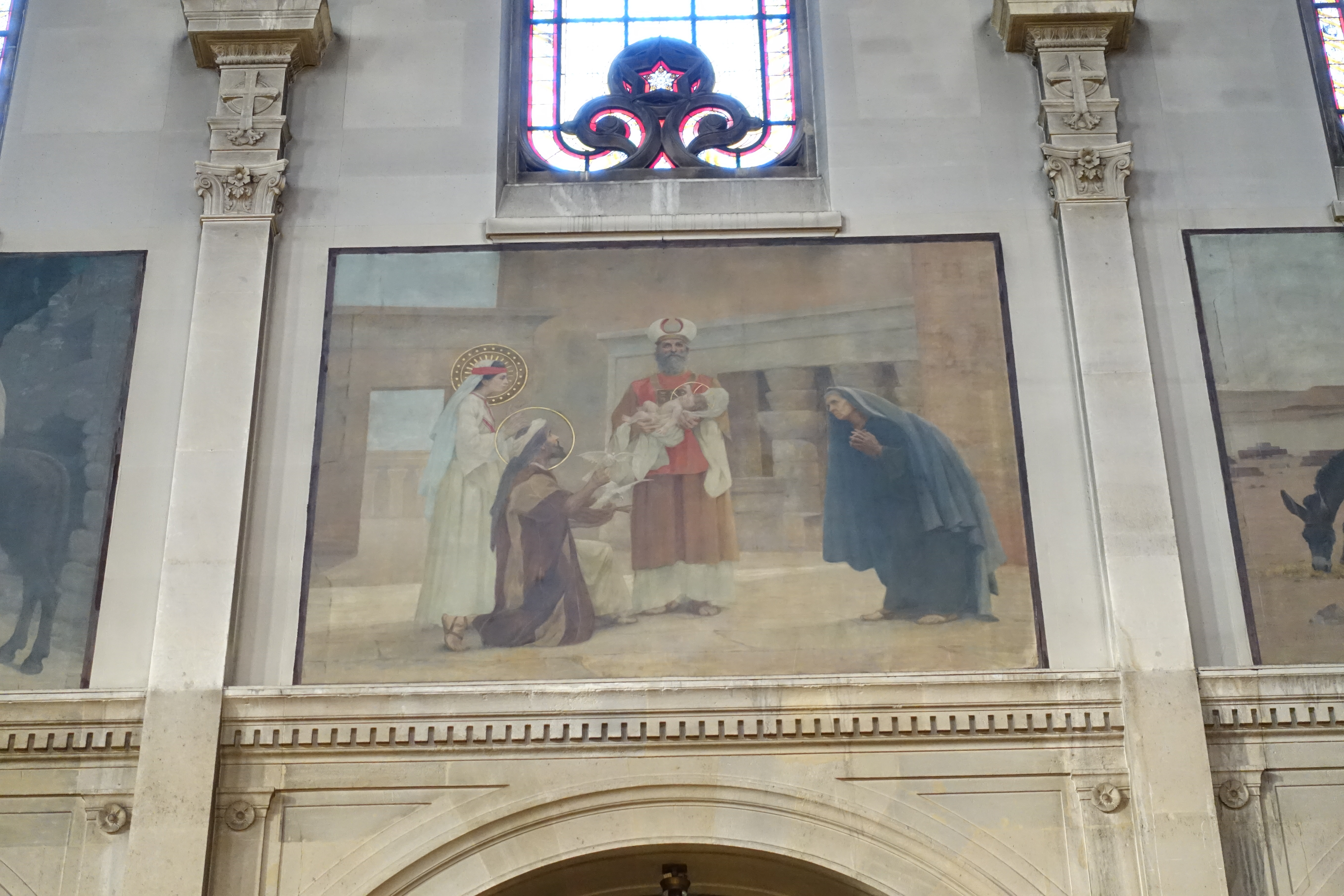
Scene from the Life of the Virgin Mary, by Joseph Aubert (Nave)

The most notable works of art within the church are a series of twenty-two paintings above the galleries in the nave and the choir, depicting the life of the Virgin Mary by the artist Joseph Aubert (1849–1924). The series is notable for the careful detail of the paintings. He devoted twenty-six years to the series, and traveled to Palestine during the project to carry out enthnographic research, particularly to study the costumes and daily life of women. In addition to the series, he painted a fresco over the choir with scenes of the life of the Virgin.

=== Grisailles ===
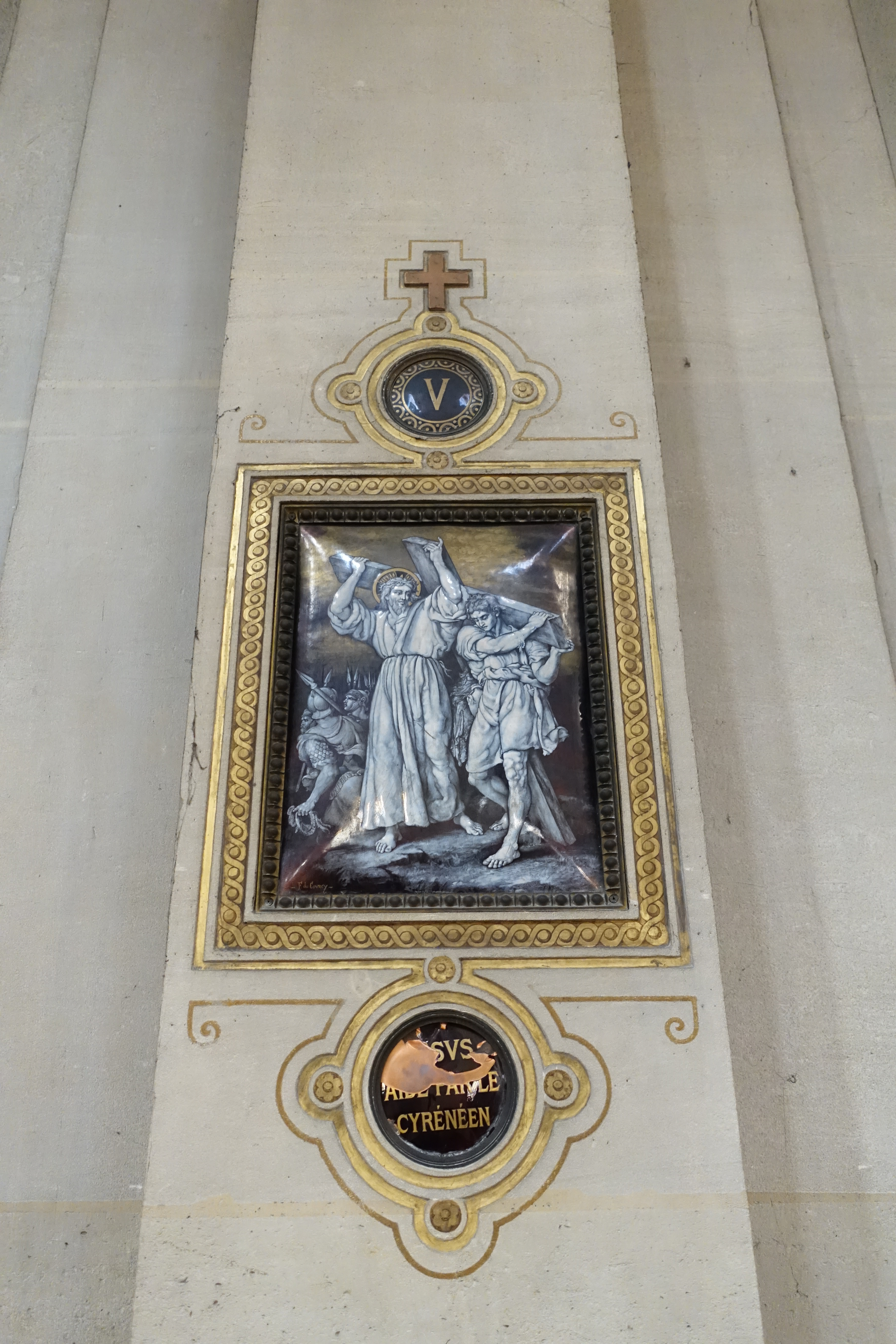
A Grisalle image illustrating the Way of the Cross.

In addition to the traditional paintings, the church displays a group of fourteen grisaille paintings, painted on enamelled copper, which depict scenes from the Biblical Way of the Cross. They were made by the artist Frédéric de Courcy. They were displayed at the Paris Salon of 1879 before they were put into place in the church.

=== Stained glass ===
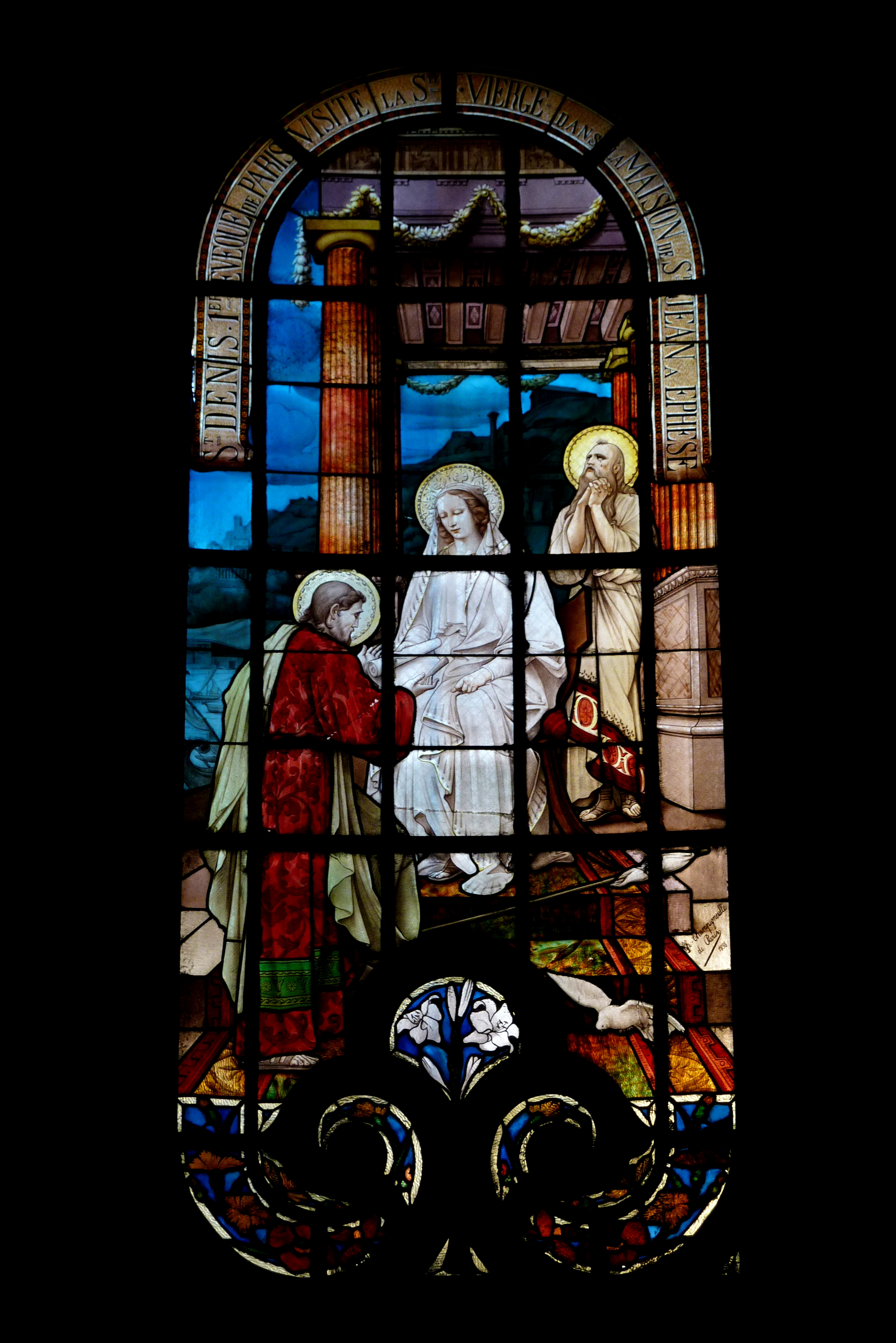
Scene from the Life the Virgin, in the Virgin chapel

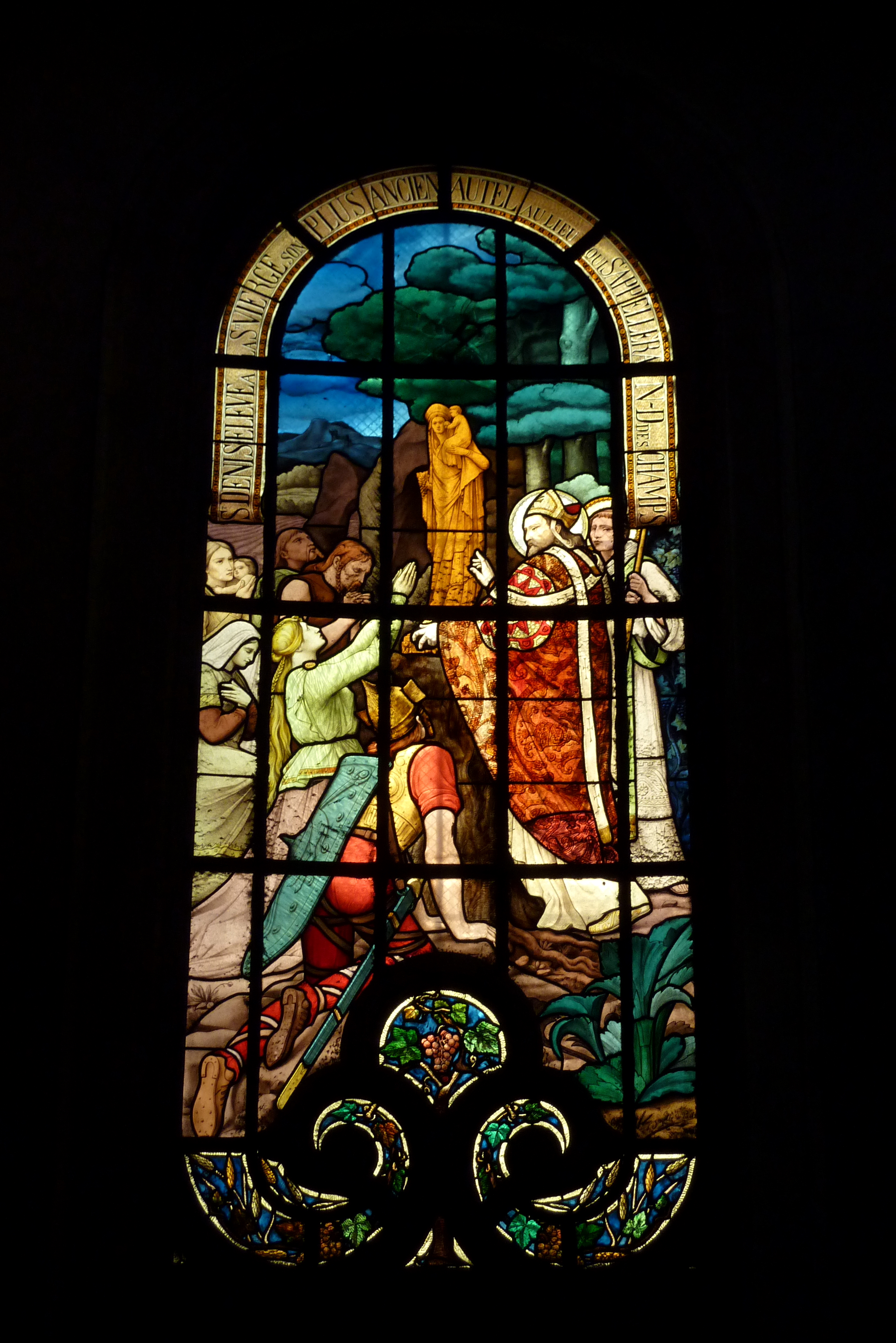
Scene from the life of the Virgin Mary, Virgin Chapel

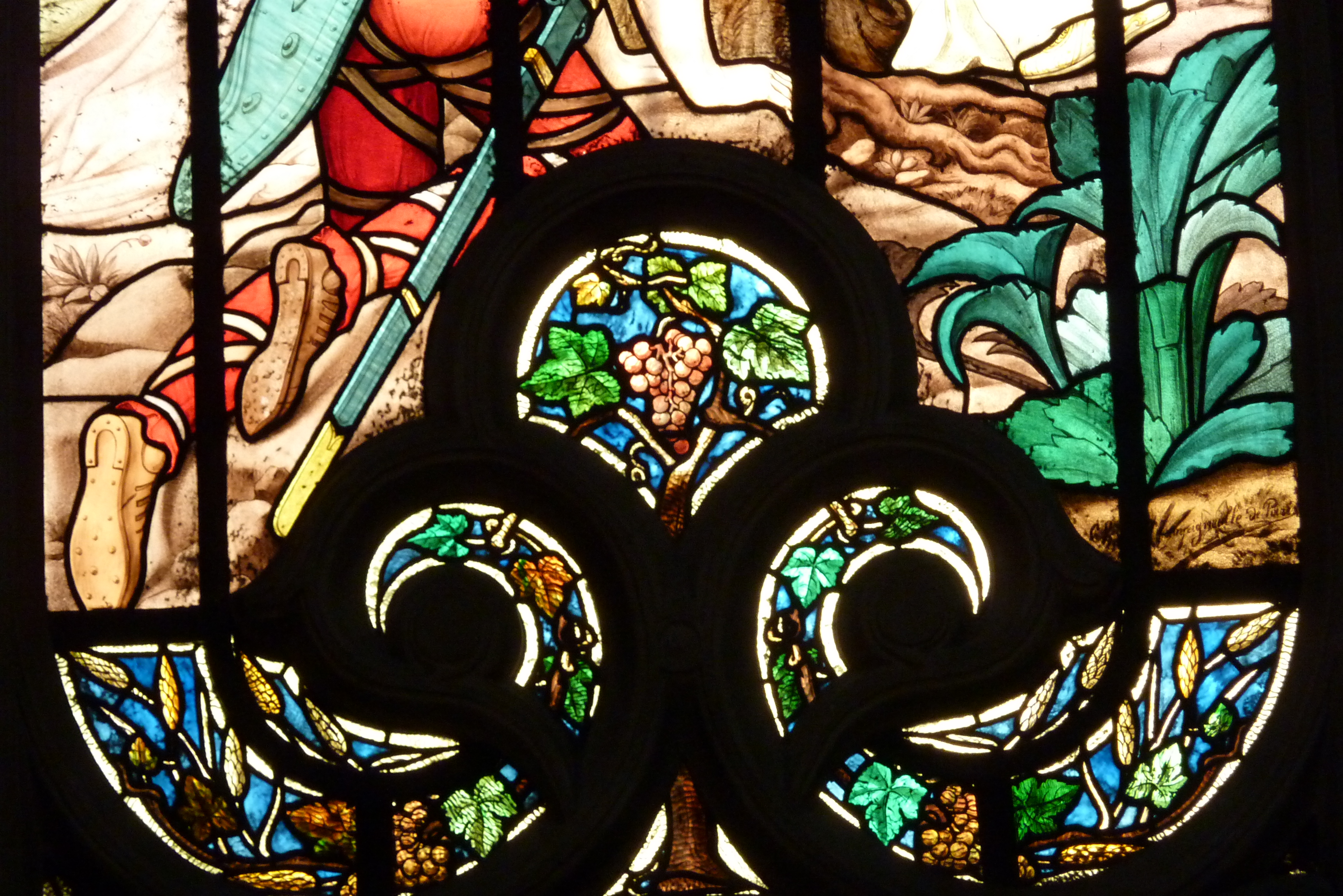
Detail from a Chapel of the Virgin window

The Chapels contain two colorful stained glass windows depicting scenes from the history of the Christian church in Paris. The window in the Chapel of the Virgin depicts "Saint Denis, the First Bishop of Paris, visiting the Virgin in the house of Saint John in Ephesus."

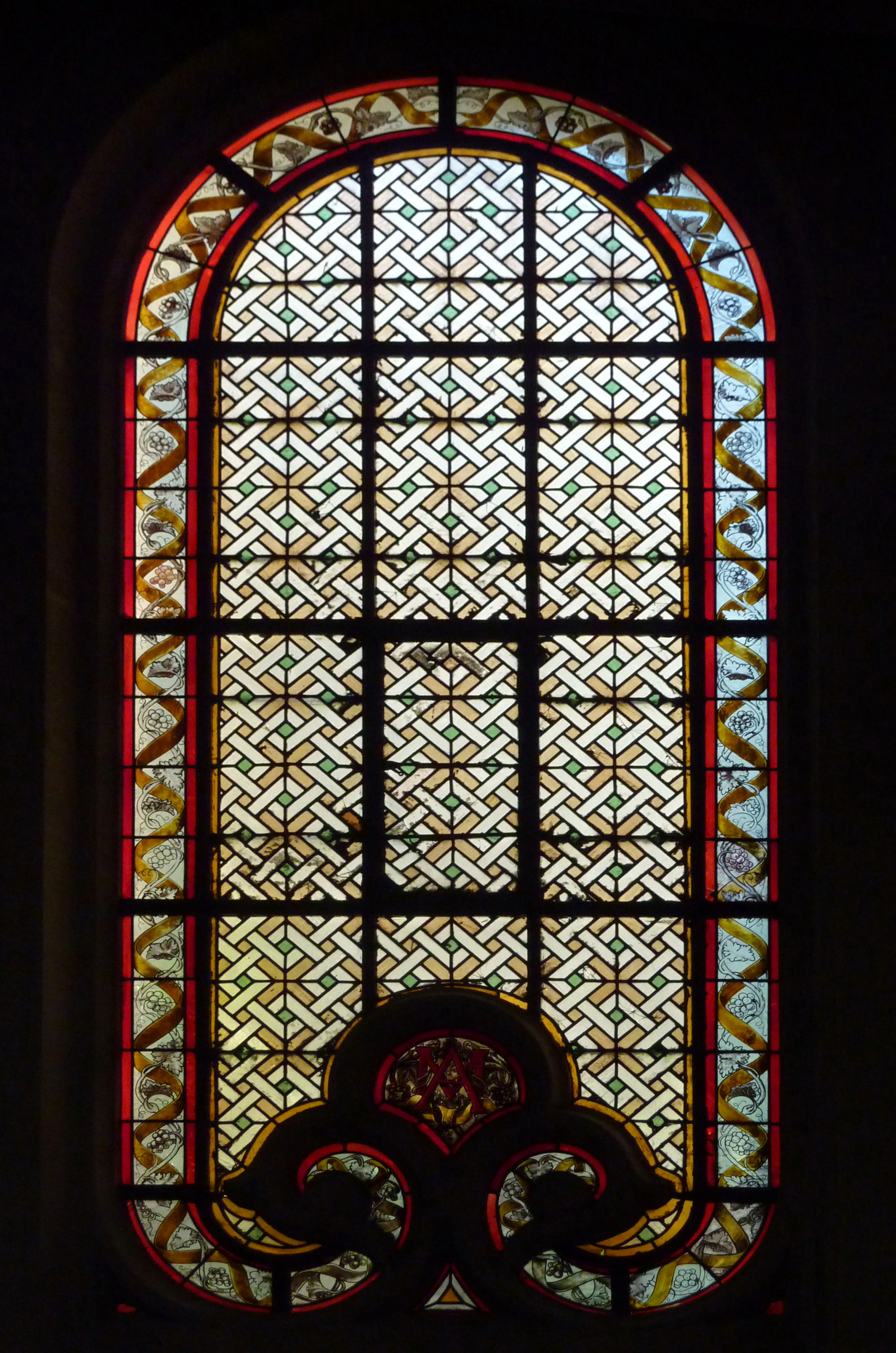
Grisaille window from nave

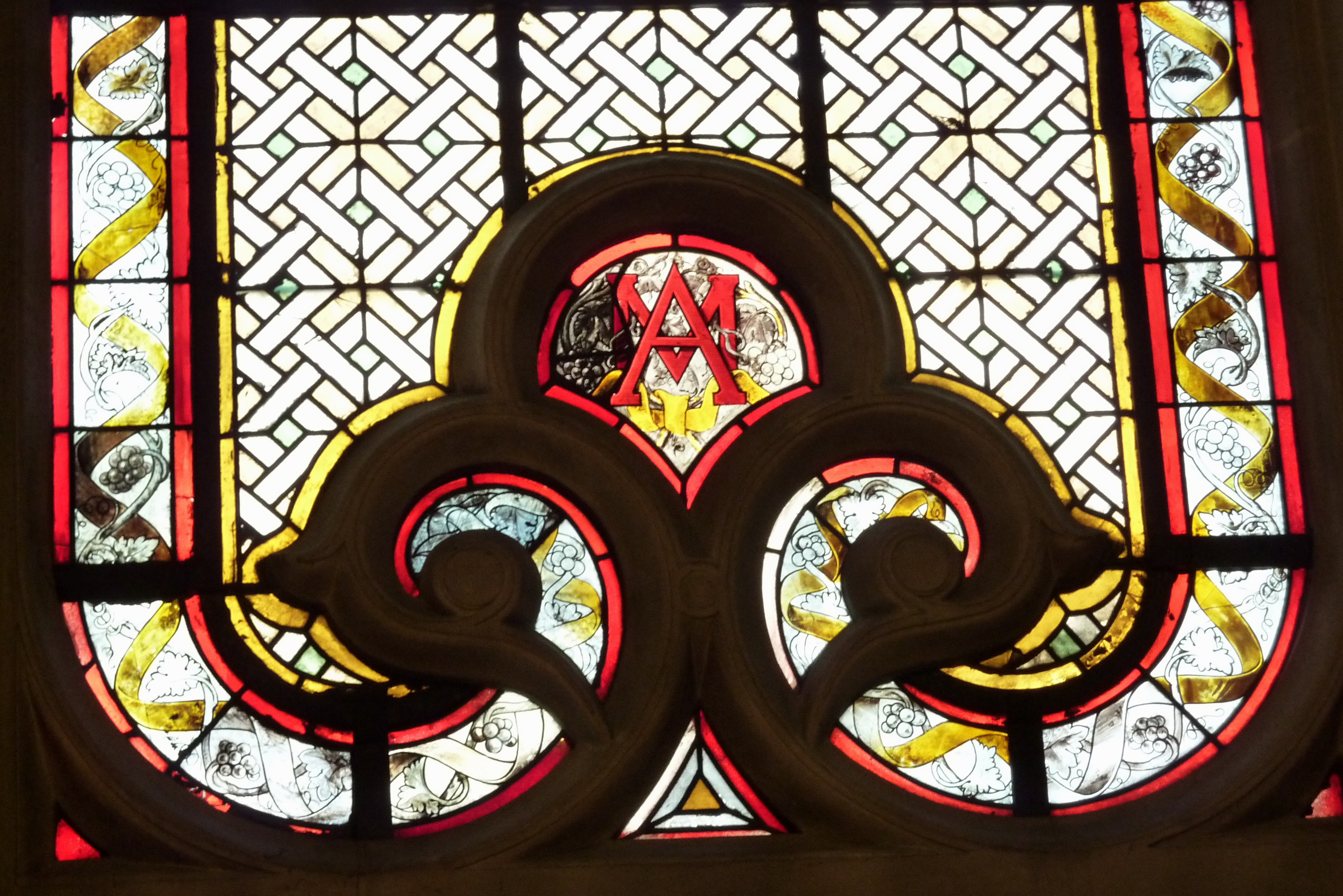
Detail of grisaille window

The large stained glass windows on the upper level along the side aisles are largely made of light-coloured glass to provide a maximum of light for the art in the interior, but the lower portions also display elaborate and colorful designs.

== The organ ==
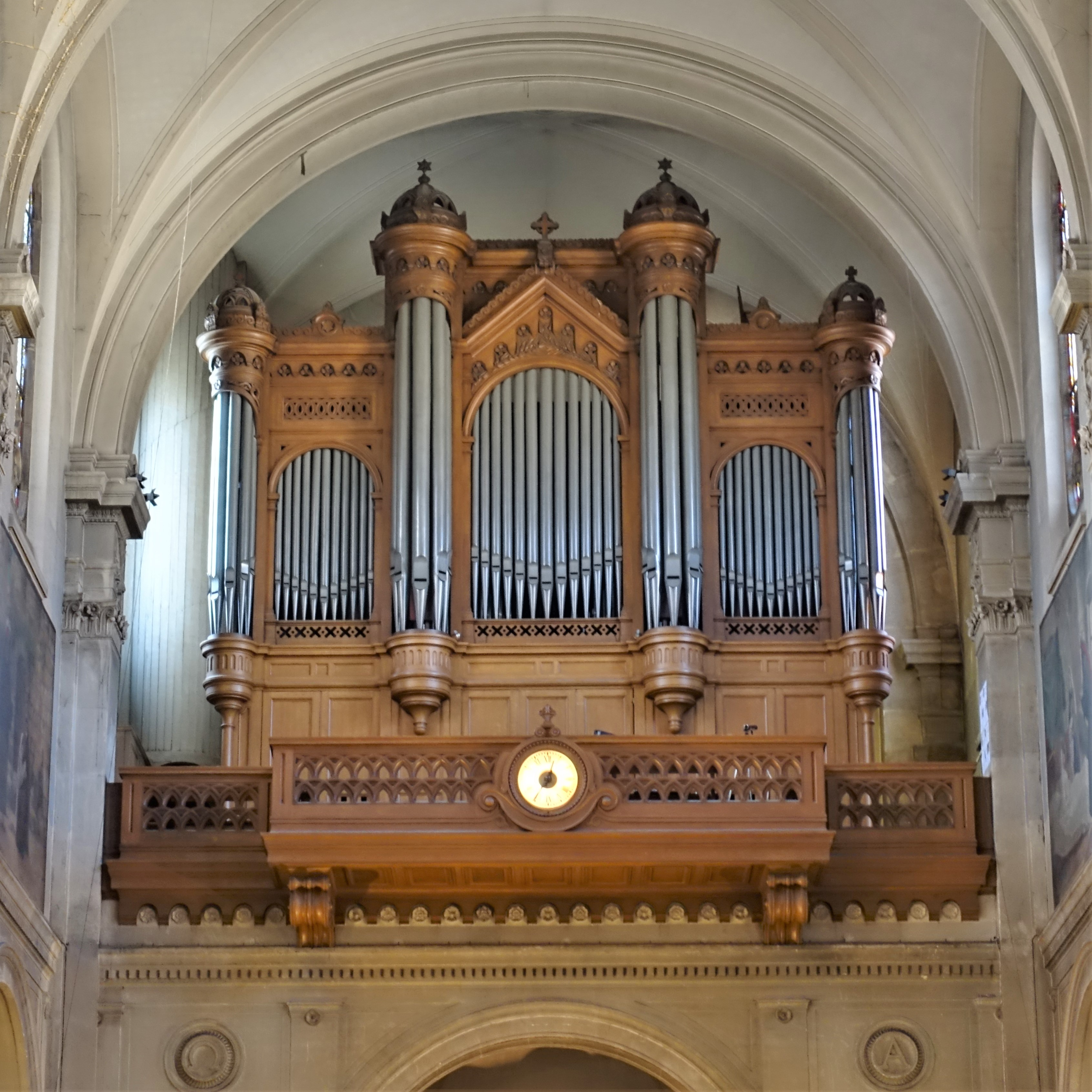

The organ of the church is located over the portal at the entrance to the nave. It was built by the firm of Cavaillé-Coll in 1877. It was restored in 1973 and again in 2004.
