= Trinité–d'Estienne d'Orves station =

Metro station in Paris, France

Trinité–d'Estienne d'Orves
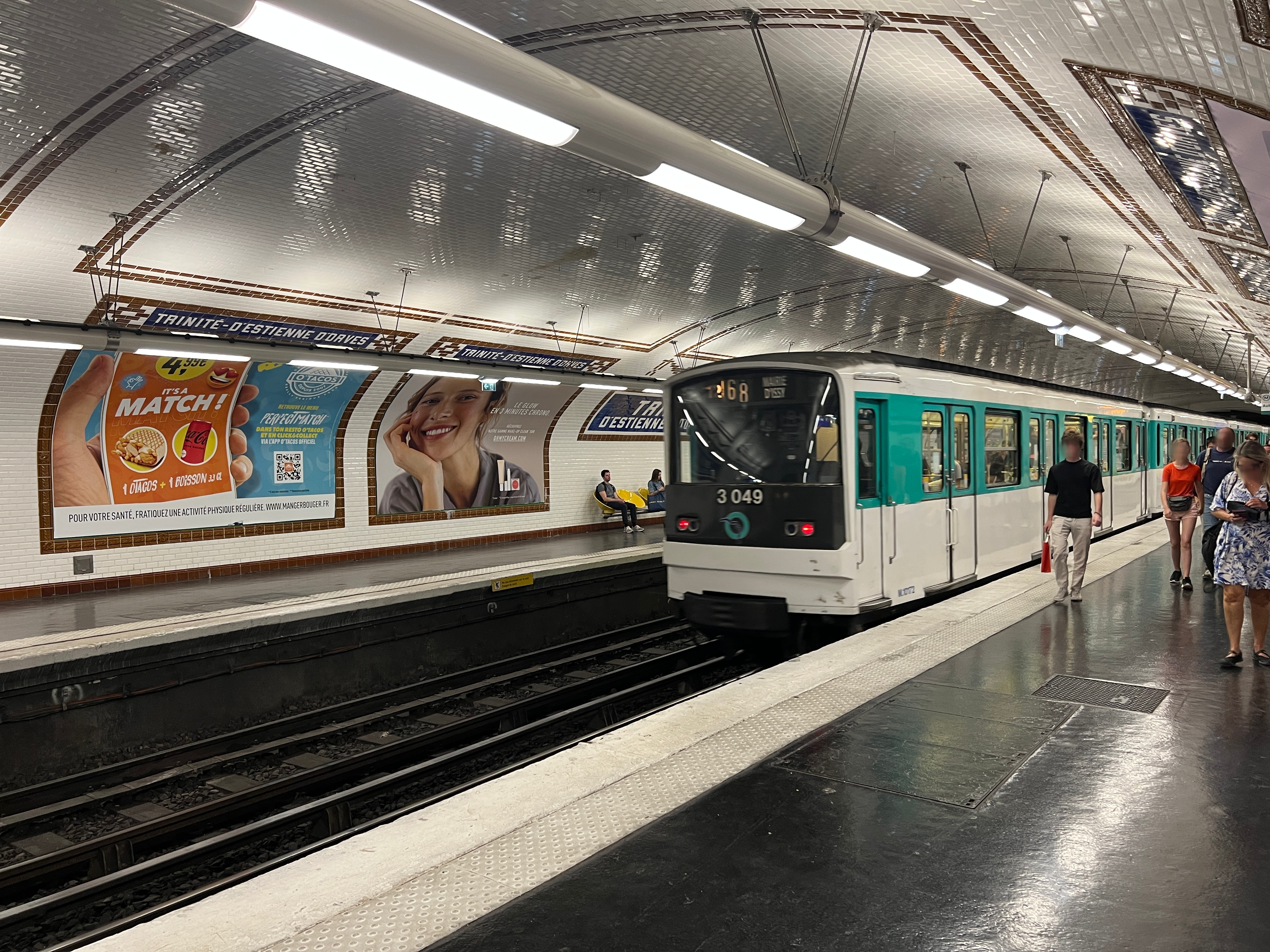

General information
- Location: 9th arrondissement of Paris; Île-de-France; France
- Coordinates: 48°52′35″N 2°20′00″E
- System: Paris Métro station
- Owner: RATP
- Operator: RATP

Other information
- Fare zone: 1

History
- Opened: 5 November 1910

Services
Preceding station	Paris Metro	Following station
Saint-Lazare towards Mairie d'Issy	Line 12	Notre-Dame-de-Lorette towards Mairie d'Aubervilliers
Location
- Location within Paris

Trinité–d'Estienne d'Orves (French pronunciation: [tʁinite detjɛn dɔʁv]) is a station on Line 12 of the Paris Métro in the commercial centre of Paris and the 9th arrondissement.

== History ==
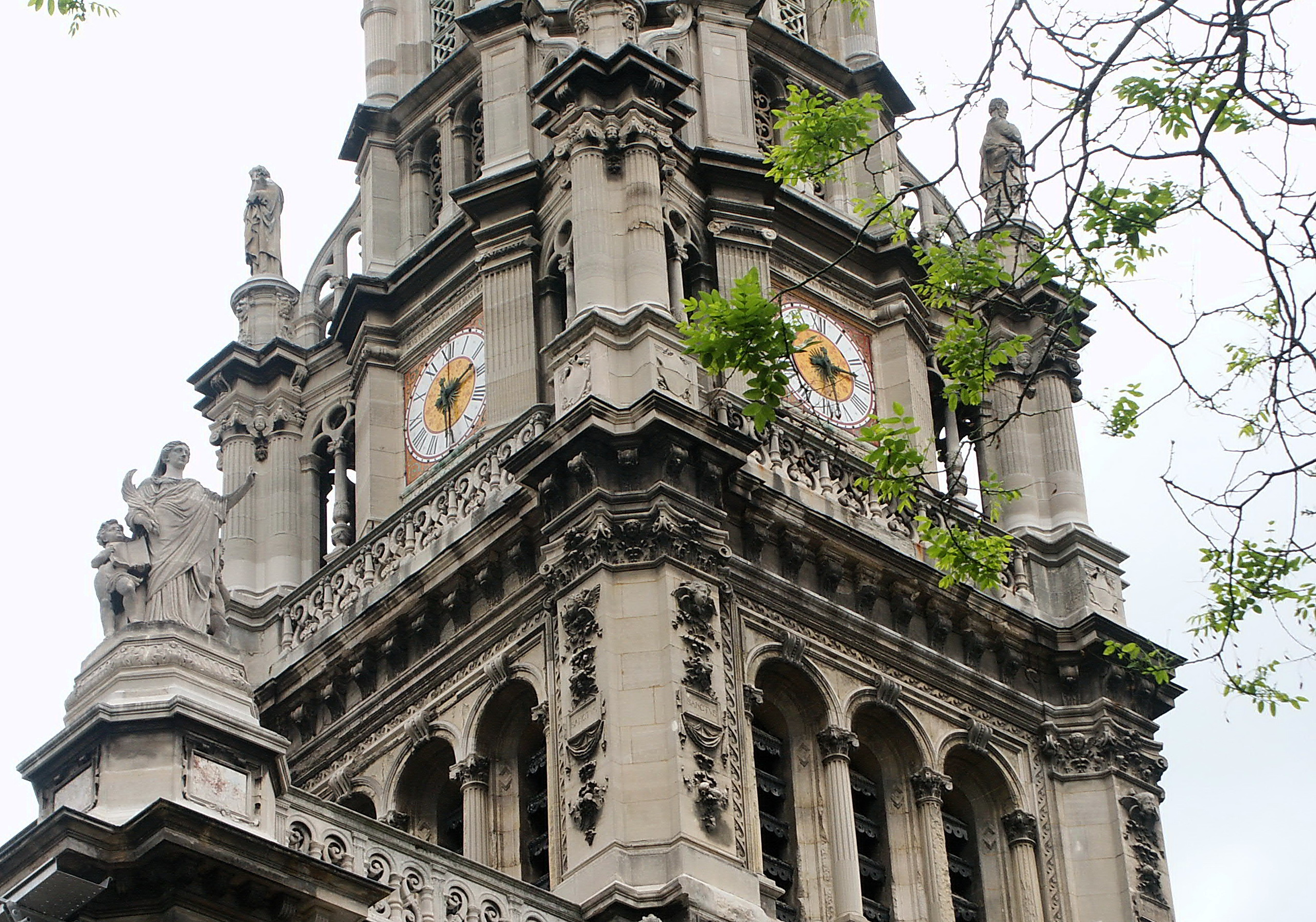
Trinité church

The station opened on 5 November 1910 as part of the original section of the Nord-Sud Company's Line A between Porte de Versailles and Notre-Dame-de-Lorette. On 27 March 1931 Line A became Line 12 of the Métro network. The station is named after the nearby church of the Trinité and the Place d'Estienne d'Orves, named after Henri Honoré d'Estienne d'Orves (1901–1941), a French Navy officer and Resistance fighter.

Nearby are the theatres of the Théâtre de Paris and Casino de Paris.

== Station layout ==
Street Level

B1	Mezzanine

Line 12 platforms	Side platform, doors will open on the right
Line 12 platforms	Southbound	← toward Mairie d'Issy (Saint-Lazare)
Line 12 platforms	Northbound	toward Mairie d'Aubervilliers (Notre-Dame-de-Lorette) →
Line 12 platforms	Side platform, doors will open on the right
