= Paris Metro Line 12 =

Subway route in the French capital

Line 12
- Paris Metro Line 12
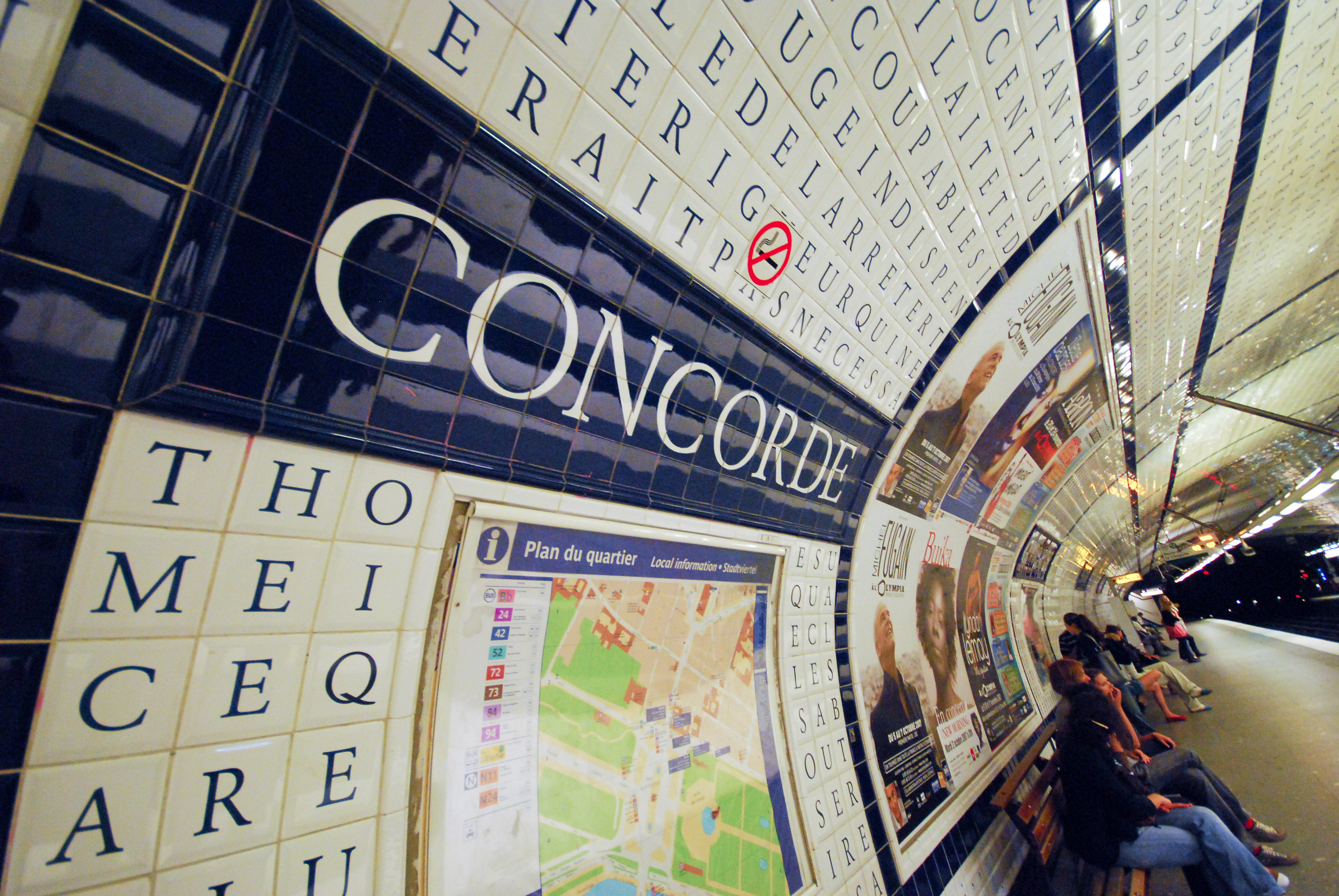
- The line's platforms at Concorde, each tile featuring one letter of the Declaration of the Rights of Man and of the Citizen

Overview
- Locale: Saint-Denis, Aubervilliers, Paris, Issy-les-Moulineaux
- Termini: Mairie d'Aubervilliers; Mairie d'Issy
- Connecting lines: Paris Metro Paris Metro Line 1 Paris Metro Line 2 Paris Metro Line 3 Paris Metro Line 4 Paris Metro Line 6 Paris Metro Line 8 Paris Metro Line 9 Paris Metro Line 10 Paris Metro Line 13 Paris Metro Line 14 RER RER E Transilien Transilien Line J (Paris-Saint-Lazare) Transilien Line L (Paris-Saint-Lazare) Transilien Line N (Paris-Montparnasse) Tramways in Île-de-France Île-de-France tramway Line 2 Île-de-France tramway Line 3a Île-de-France tramway Line 3b
- Stations: 31

Service
- System: Paris Métro
- Operator: RATP
- Rolling stock: MF 67 (51 trains as of 30 July 2023)
- Ridership: 84.3 million (avg. per year); 11th/16 (2025)

History
- Opened: 5 November 1910; 116 years ago

Technical
- Line length: 17.2 km (10.7 mi)
- Track gauge: 1,435 mm (4 ft 8 1/2 in) standard gauge
- Electrification: 750 V DC third rail
- Conduction system: Conductor (PA)
- Average inter-station distance: 573 m (1,880 ft)

Paris Metro Line 12 (French: Ligne 12 du métro de Paris : initially opened as Ligne A du Nord-Sud (North-South Line A)) is one of the sixteen lines currently open on the Paris Métro. It links Issy-les-Moulineaux, a suburban town southwest of Paris, to Aubervilliers, in the northeast. With around 54 million passengers per year, Line 12 was the twelfth busiest line of the network in 2021. It services several major stops, such as Porte de Versailles, Concorde, Madeleine, and two national railway stations, Gare Montparnasse and Gare Saint-Lazare. The service runs every day of the week, and the line uses MF 67 series trains, the network's standard since the early 1970s.

Line 12 was founded in 1905 as Line A by the Nord-Sud Company, who also built Line 13. It was built between 1905 and 1910, to connect the districts of Montparnasse, in the south, and Montmartre, in the north of the French capital. The first trip, from Porte de Versailles to Notre-Dame-de-Lorette, was on 5 November 1910. The line was the second to be built on the north–south axis of the city, in competition with Line 4 of the Compagnie du chemin de fer métropolitain de Paris (CMP; Paris Metropolitan Railway Company). It was extended bit by bit until 1934 when it reached Mairie d'Issy in the south. Tunnelling to the northern terminus at the Porte de la Chapelle on the perimeter of Paris had been completed in 1916. In 1930, the CMP bought the failing Nord-Sud company and Line A was integrated into the new, unified network as Line 12. In 1949, the CMP was itself merged into the RATP, Paris's public transport company, which still operates the line today.

The line was built using cut-and-cover excavation techniques. Since this method cannot be used under buildings, the route follows the streets above. It remains unchanged today and many original design features, such as the Nord-Sud company's refined ceramic decor, remains in the stations. Some stations are decorated thematically: Assemblée Nationale has murals explaining the intricacies of the lower house of the French Parliament, while the tiling at Concorde represents an extract from the Declaration of the Rights of Man and of the Citizen (1789).

== History ==
=== Planning (1901–1905) ===
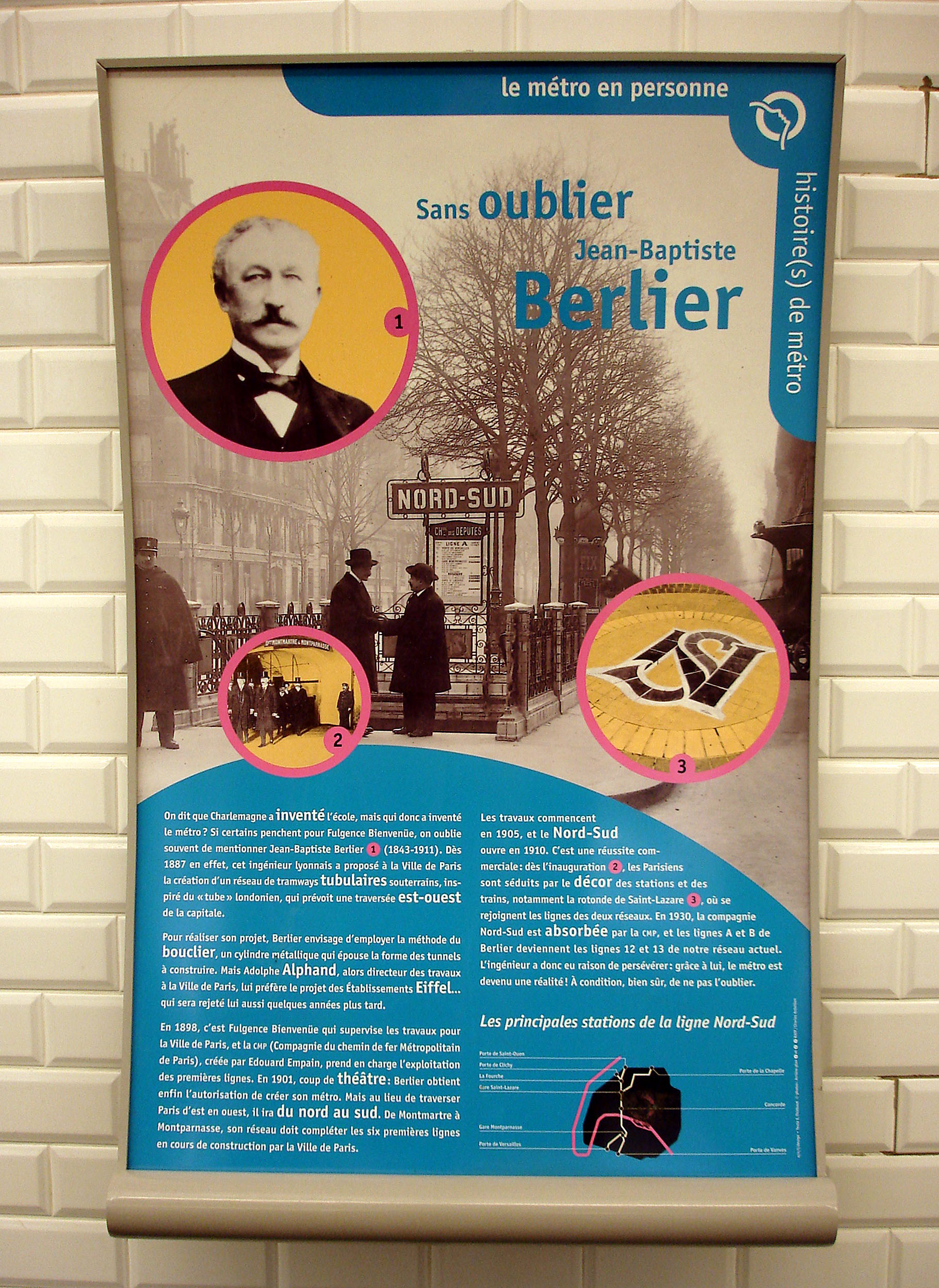
Tribute to Jean-Baptiste Berlier, founder of Line 12, in the Saint-Lazare station

Engineer Jean-Baptiste Berlier proposed to the City of Paris to finance and build a new line linking the areas of Montmartre and Gare Saint-Lazare in the north with Montparnasse and Vaugirard in the south. The line would establish a second north–south transport axis of the city, west of the existing line four. Berlier's design of two deep, parallel, iron-lined tunnels was modelled on the London Underground system. This method allowed the straightest line possible to be built, without passing underneath buildings and free from interference with underground sewers. The City Council liked the plan and on 28 December 1901 granted the tender for a Montparnasse-Montmartre line to Misters Janicot and Berlier. In June 1902, a new company, rival of the "Parisian Metropolitan Rail Company" (CMP), was established : the Nord-Sud Company (in French French: Société du chemin de fer électrique souterrain Nord-Sud de Paris). The grant to build what would become Line A was transferred to the Nord-Sud Company; which was approved on 26 March 1907. While the infrastructure of the CMP was financed by the city corporation, Nord-Sud project was the sole responsibility of the Nord-Sud Company.

The link between two important but distant urban centres guaranteed heavy traffic for the line and it would also directly compete with the CMP and tramway companies, threatening their monopoly across the city. The City was wary of inciting new demands to license other lines, and of eventually provoking industrial disorder, something already experienced on the tramway network. French law required a Déclaration d'utilité publique ("Declaration of Public Utility"), a statement of the project's public benefit before municipal construction, the concerns meant that it was not promulgated for the 6.216 km (3.862 mi) line until 3 April 1905. The law announced the creation "of public utility, of local interest, this establishment, in Paris, of a railroad, electrically powered, dedicated to the transport of passengers and their hand-luggage, from Montmartre to Montparnasse". The law became active on 19 July 1905, the southern terminus was at Porte de Versailles, 3.154 km (1.960 mi) long, with a northern branch from Gare Saint-Lazare to Porte de Saint-Ouen. On 10 April 1908, the northern extension from Place des Abbesses to Place Jules Joffrin, 1.32 km (0.82 mi) long, was in turn authorised, followed by the final section to Porte de la Chapelle (2.067 km or 1.284 mi) on 24 January 1912.

=== Construction and opening (1907–1910) ===
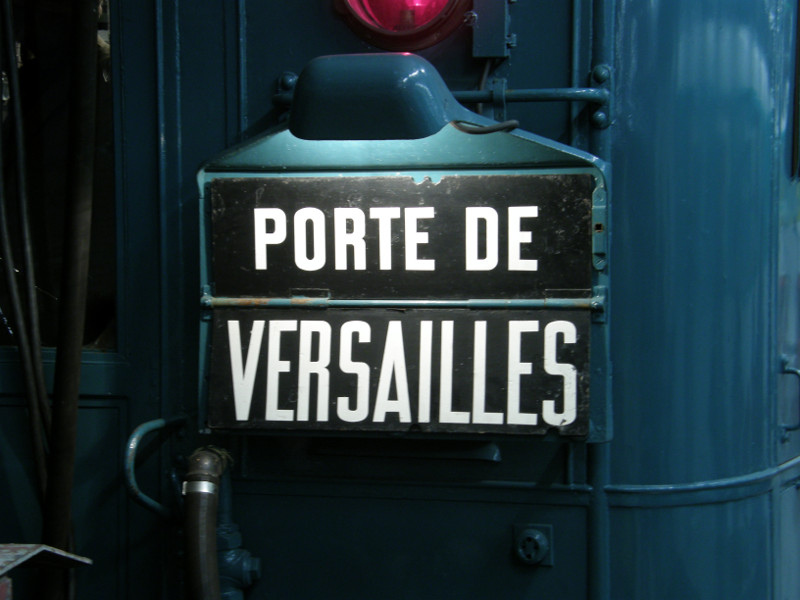
Porte de Versailles terminus indicator on a Nord-Sud Sprague-Thomson train

The boggy undersoil of Paris made it impossible for the engineers to follow their initial concept of deeply excavated, metal-lined tunnels, foiling Berlier's original idea. Digging deeper to more stable grounds would raise costs, which were at Berlier's own expense. The line was finally established immediately underneath the streets using the cut and cover method of the CMP's lines, the then-standard in use on the Metropolitan system. As a consequence, the layout contains several difficult curves especially in the northern part where narrow streets have a winding route. The line had 23 stations, all with vaulted roof construction. An interchange with lines A and B was established at Saint-Lazare, but there was no connection with the CMP's lines.

Work on the sub-fluvial tunnel underneath the Seine, between the Chambre des Députés station (now known as Assemblée nationale) and Concorde, took place between July 1907 and July 1909. This 657 m (2,156 ft) long section runs through a bed of limestone after a break in the sand on the Rive Gauche. The under-river passage was bored by two early tunnel boring machines, each with an external diameter of 5.24 m (17 ft 2 in). The head of the machine cut into the rock, while in two intermediate chambers 24 hydraulic jacks exerted a pressure of 2.4 tonnes (2.6 short tons) on the rock walls so the machine could advance. At the back, a mobile arm turned on the axis of the tunnelling shield to install panels on walls of the tunnel.

The two tubes, with an internal diameter of 5 m (16 ft 5 in), were made from 60 cm (24 in) thick rings of cast iron. Each ring was constructed from ten 1.54 m (5 ft 1 in) panels, with one 0.77 m (2 ft 6 in) counter-key panel and a 0.29 metres (11 in) key panel to lock the segments in place. The casing extended 548 m (1,798 ft) downstream and 533 metres (1,749 ft) upstream. The two tubes are not parallel: the distance between them varies from 5.80 to 18.60 m (19 ft 0 in to 61 ft 0 in). Work was delayed by the 1910 Great Flood of Paris. During the works, the future Chambre des Députés station housed an air and water compressor. The compressed air prevented the collapse of the digging shield from the weight of the waters above. The tubes, initially unlined apart from the cast iron rings, were covered with an internal protective layer of masonry in 1920.

The section from Porte de Versailles to Notre-Dame-de-Lorette was inaugurated on 4 November 1910 and opened to the public on the next day. Porte de Versailles was set up as a terminus station with a connection to a workshop. The latter was joined by to the Petite Ceinture rail line, which allowed for the transfer of trains between lines. At the other end, the provisional terminus at Notre-Dame-de-Lorette was set up with three tracks including a central depot.

On the opening day, public representatives rode from Notre-Dame-de-Lorette to Porte de Versailles, and returned to Gare Saint-Lazare for a buffet held in the rotunda. The press reports were laudatory, citing the journey's smoothness, and the stations' brightness. From the beginning, the traffic on the line was significant and the quantity of rolling stock had quickly to be increased. From 5 November 1910 until 30 June 1911, the line carried 29,263,610 passengers.

=== Developments to the present ===
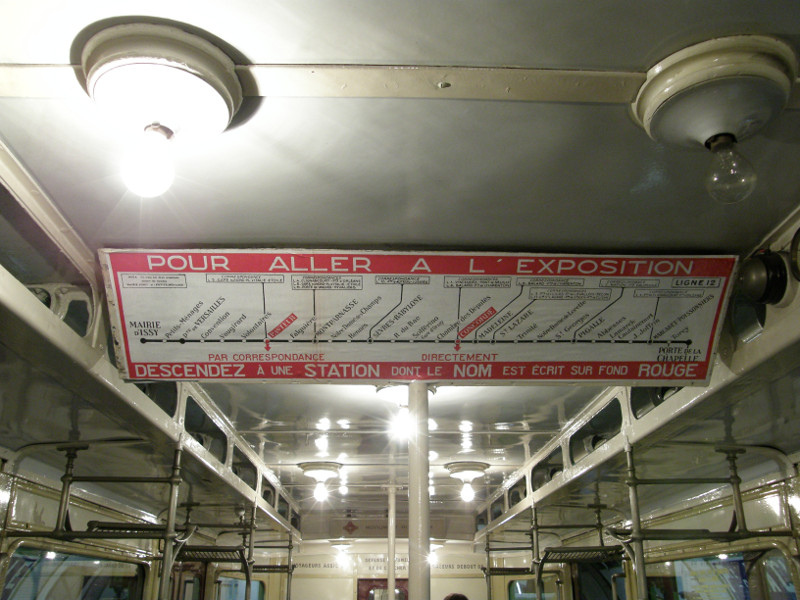
The route of line 12 as it was displayed in 1931 for the Paris Colonial Exposition

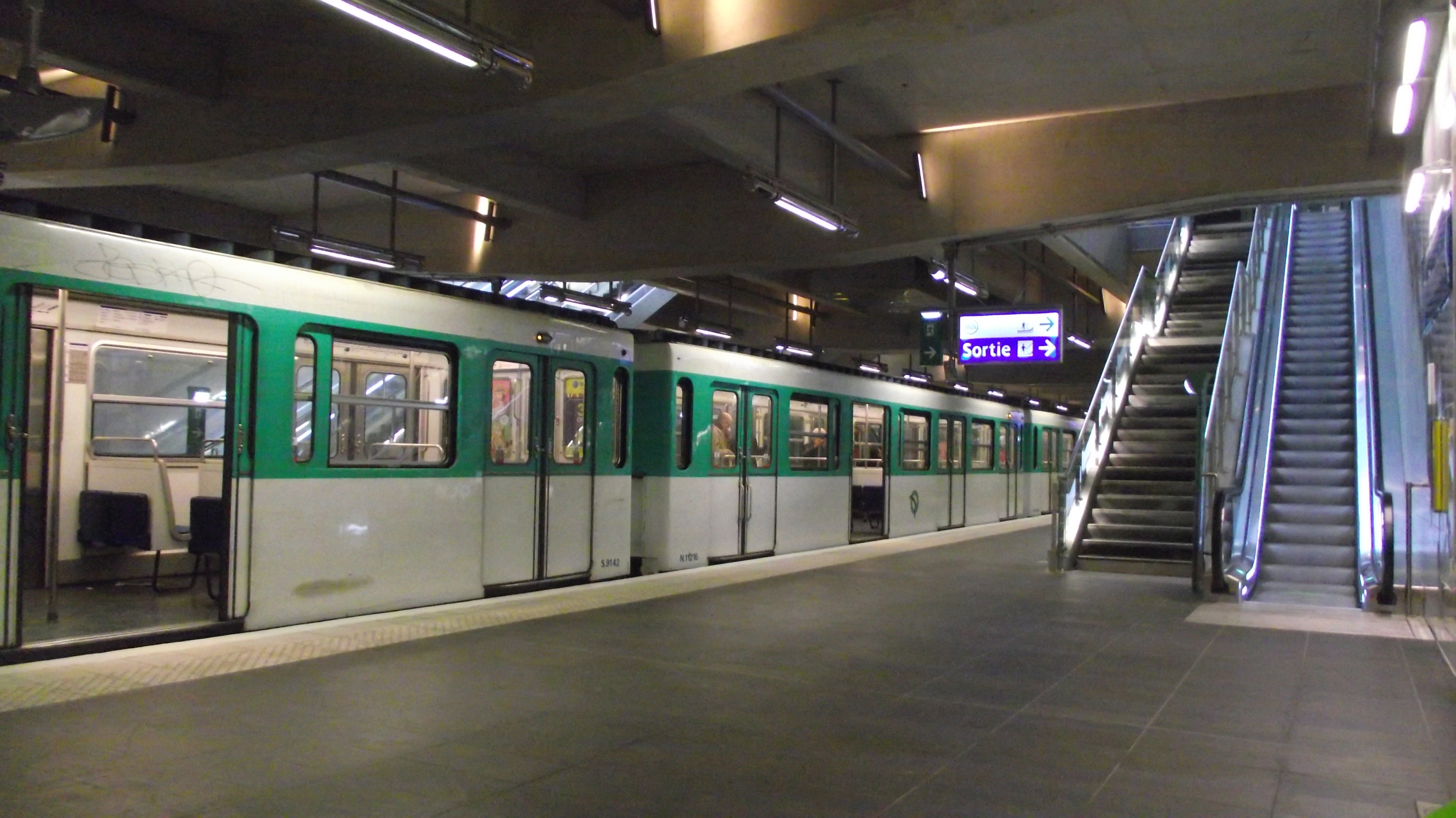
Front Populaire (south of Aubervilliers), the very first modern station of Line 12.

On 8 April 1911, the line was extended north to Pigalle. A subsequent three station extension to Jules Joffrin proved particularly difficult, as the route passed underneath the hill of Montmartre, which had long been quarried and mined for gypsum to make plaster of paris. During the tunnel's construction, numerous unknown quarries were discovered forcing a change in the line's route to avoid them. The two intermediate stations, Abbesses and Lamarck – Caulaincourt, are particularly deep : 36 m (118 ft) and 25 m (82 ft) below ground level, respectively, with Abbesses holding the network's depth record until Villejuif — Gustave Roussy opened in 2025, which itself will be dethroned by Saint-Maur–Créteil in 2026. The Nord-Sud engineers constructed arches underground to support the weight of the gypsum above. The extension was put into service on 30 October 1912.

Work on the final extension northwards began in September 1912, but the tunnel was not finished at the beginning of the First World War. Though lacking personnel, the construction work continued at a slower pace. On 23 August 1916, in the middle of the war, the line reached Porte de la Chapelle. This extension comprised three new stations, of which the final included three tracks and two central platforms, the central track being used by trains leaving or arriving. Line A intersected with Line 4 at Marcadet – Poissonniers, but no transfer had yet been set up.

On 1 January 1930, the CMP absorbed the Nord-Sud company, and line A became line 12 of the Métropolitain network on 27 March 1931, stealing the number 12 from an abandoned Fulgence Bienvenüe's complementary line from Porte d'Orleans to Porte d'Italie. Deeming the number of trains on the line insufficient, the CMP transferred four trains from their holding to augment the service.

The Nord-Sud company lines were powered through overhead cables, whereas the third rail system was in use on the CMP's network. With the ownership transition, the CMP standard was adopted on the lines 12 and 13. As a result, the overhead cables of the Nord-Sud were decommissioned in 1932, one year after those of line 13. Pantographs continued to be used in the Vaugirard workshops. To improve the lines' connection and carriages transfer, a new switch track was built in 1935 between the Montparnasse station of Line 12 and the Vavin station of line 4, still standing by to this day.

On 23 April 1930, a collision was caused by human error close to the Porte de Versailles station. A train moving north was stopped before a red signal between Porte de Versailles and Convention stations. A second hit it hard from behind, the driver passing two stop signals at full speed. Two people were killed, and numerous injuries were reported.

On 12 July 1928, the Seine general council decided to extend the Métropolitain by 1.5 km (0.93 mi), taking it beyond the limit of Paris so that line A would serve the town of Issy-les-Moulineaux with two new stations. Work began in 1931 and led to the relocation of Porte de Versailles station further south, the new station being set up with two platforms staggered by 40 m (130 ft). The platforms of the old station were removed and sidings were installed to house trains not in use. The extension comprised only two stations with 75-metre (246 ft) long platforms, terminating at standard two track station, followed by a reversing area. On 24 March 1934, the southern extension to Mairie d'Issy was inaugurated, the same day as the line 1 extension east to Château de Vincennes.

On the night of 20 April 1944, during the Liberation of Paris, the freight station of Porte de la Chapelle and the RATP central workshop on rue Championnet were bombarded. The former, which is also the line's terminus, was severely damaged though hasty repairs returned it to service a few days later.

The line was equipped with a centralised control room in 1971. In 1977 the arrival of MF 67 rolling stock allowed the inauguration of Automatic Train Control on Line 12.

On 30 August 2000, the ATC was put under question as an accident happened due to its constant use : A train's automatic control function broke down, forcing its unused driver to operate manually. The defective train arrived too fast into the steep curved decline between Saint Georges and Notre-Dame-de-Lorette stations. The front car derailed, and 24 people were injured. The investigation concluded that a specific emergency signal be installed on the approach to the latter station, and that drivers must preserve their skills by running at least one of their daily line runs in full manual mode.

A project to extend the line northwards began in the second half of 2007, with the tunnel boring machine started to operate in 2009. The tunnel was dug as far as Aubervilliers, but the entrances to the Pont de Stains and Mairie d'Aubervilliers stations were not built immediately.

The first phase of the extension led Line 12 to Front Populaire, which was opened to public service on 18 December 2012. The station sits on the boundary between Saint-Denis and Aubervilliers, and serves La Plaine Saint-Denis, a diverse industrial district home to many television studios. Initially called "Proudhon – Gardinoux" in the planning stages of the project (after the intersection of rue Proudhon and rue des Gardinoux), the station was renamed "Front Populaire" after the adjacent well-known square.

Works on the first phase cost 198.5 million euros (48% from regional funding, 27.5% from the state, 8.5% from the Department's General Council, 16% from the RATP – on a loan approved by the region).

In a second phase, two further stations, at Aimé Césaire and Mairie d'Aubervilliers, opened on 31 May 2022.

=== Timeline ===
- 28 December 1901: Paris concedes rights to a subway line connecting Montmartre to Montparnasse to Mr Berlier and Mr Janicot.
- 5 November 1910: Line A of the Nord-Sud company was opened from Porte de Versailles to Notre-Dame de Lorette.
- 8 April 1911: The line was extended northbound from Notre-Dame de Lorette to Pigalle.
- 31 October 1912: The line was extended from Pigalle to Jules Joffrin.
- 23 August 1916: The line was extended from Jules Joffrin to Porte de la Chapelle.
- 1 January 1930: The Nord-Sud company was bought by the CMP company. Line A became line 12.
- 23 April 1930: First serious accident on the line, caused by a driver's fault, led to two casualties and several injured.
- 24 March 1934: The line was extended from Porte de Versailles to Mairie d'Issy.
- September 1939: The Rennes station, alongside many others on the network, are closed at the dawn of World War II.
- 20 May 1968: Rennes station reopens, albeit with reduced opening hours.
- 30 August 2000: Second serious accident on the line, caused by a defective Auto Traction Control feature leading a train too fast on a steep curve at Notre-Dame de Lorette. Mandated manual runs per service are put in place for the Line 12's drivers as a result.
- 6 September 2004: Rennes station recovers normal opening hours.
- 18 December 2012: The line was extended from Porte de la Chapelle to Aubervilliers - Saint-Denis - Front Populaire.
- 31 May 2022: The line was extended from Front Populaire to Mairie d'Aubervilliers.

== Route ==
Geographically accurate route of Line 12

Line 12 is 18.37 km (11.41 mi) long and completely underground. It is, by design, a particularly twisting route with multiple corners and steep climbs.

Beginning at Issy-les-Moulineaux, south-west of Paris, with a three-way tunnel underneath avenue Victor-Cresson, the terminus is at Mairie d'Issy, and has only two tracks on a standard layout station. It runs north-east, entering Paris at Porte de Versailles, a major station with three tracks, one of which gives access to the Vaugirard workshops. The line then runs underneath the eponymous street.

After Falguière, the line veers back south-east in a 150 m (490 ft) radius bend underneath the Boulevard du Montparnasse. It connects with line 4, line 6, and line 13 at Montparnasse – Bienvenüe, and exit leads toward the Tour Montparnasse. Before the station, a single-track branches south : the beginning of a planned branch line to Porte de Vanves (which later became line C of the Nord-Sud Company). This branch was in turn integrated into the original line 14 of the Métropolitain system, which itself got absorbed by line 13 in 1976. The Vanves branch now serves as a depot and workshop.

After the junction with Line 4 at Montparnasse – Bienvenüe, Line 12 goes north-west underneath the Boulevard Raspail; at 1,274 m (4,180 ft) long. After the Rue du Bac station, it runs north underneath the Boulevard Saint-Germain until reaching the Seine at the Palais Bourbon (Assemblée Nationale station), under which it dips under RER Line C through a 4 per cent descent and 3.5 per cent climb, to reappear on the Right Bank. After Concorde, the tunnel burrows below Line 1's own, then follows a twisting route through Rue Saint Florentin, then Rue du Chevalier-de-Saint-George and finally Rue Duphot before reaching Madeleine, named after the Église de la Madeleine, where the bend necessitates curved platforms.

The route also goes underneath the tunnel of the new Line 14, and twists north underneath Rue Tronchet. After intersecting with Line 13, it reaches Saint-Lazare by a curve with a radius of just 60 m (200 ft), turning east under Rue Saint-Lazare.

Between the Trinité station and the Notre-Dame-de-Lorette station the tunnel has three lines, including a central one which connects the two at the exit of Trinité. This extra track was used for a long time to move the trains of Line 13 from the Vaugirard workshop back to their line (before the merger with the old line 14 the extension towards Châtillon – Montrouge and the creation of a new workshop).

In preparation for the ascent of the Montmartre hill, the line veers sharply north in two curves of 50 m (160 ft) radius, putting the tunnel under Rue Notre-Dame-de-Lorette. There it climbs on a 4 per cent slope until the next station, Saint-Georges, where the tracks are divided by a supporting wall. Then Line 12 climbs on towards Pigalle station, where it intersects with and runs under Line 2 and passes under a sewer.

Between Abbesses and Lamarck-Caulaincourt stations, line 12 crosses Montmartre at a maximum depth of 63 m (207 ft), close to the Sacré Cœur Basilica, making Line 12 the network's deepest. At Lamarck-Caulaincourt station, the line reaches its highest point, after which it makes a 4 per cent descent towards Jules-Joffrin station, situated under Rue Ordener, then to Marcadet-Poissoniers station, where the line again crosses Line 4. The tunnel runs underneath the railways departing from Gare du Nord, then slants northwards in a 50 m (160 ft) radius curve into Marx Dormoy station, in the Goutte d'Or neighbourhood. The line continues down a slope of 2.6 per cent, with new bends, before arriving at Porte de la Chapelle station, on the northern edge of Paris. This station was previously the northern terminus and has three lines with platforms, leading into a four-tunnel depot. Beyond the depot, a new tunnel was constructed for the first phase of the extension towards Aubervillers, passing underneath the ring road, and exiting the northern fringe of Paris for the first time. After an eastward curvature, the line arrives at Aubervillers - Front Populaire, the first modern station of Line 12. The new station is situated at the edge of Saint-Denis and Aubervilliers, and is a traditional 2-track layout with platforms on either side of the track. After this, the line continues via Aimé Césaire to Mairie d'Aubervilliers(From fr:Ligne 12 du métro de Paris).

== Stations ==
Station	Image	Commune	Opened	Interchanges	Distance (in km)	
Mairie d'Aubervilliers; Plaine des Vertus		Aubervilliers	31 May 2022		–	0.0
Aubervilliers; Aimé Césaire		Aubervilliers	31 May 2022		0.8	0.8
Aubervilliers–Saint-Denis; Front Populaire		Aubervilliers, Saint-Denis	18 December 2012		0.9	1.7
Porte de la Chapelle; Saint-Denis		Paris (18th)	23 August 1916	Tramways in Île-de-France Île-de-France tramway Line 3b	1.4	3.1
Marx Dormoy		Paris (18th)	23 August 1916		0.8	3.9
Marcadet–Poissonniers		Paris (18th)	23 August 1916	Paris Metro Paris Metro Line 4	0.8	4.7
Jules Joffrin		Paris (18th)	31 October 1912		0.4	5.1
Lamarck–Caulaincourt		Paris (18th)	31 October 1912		0.7	5.8
Abbesses; Butte Montmartre		Paris (18th)	30 January 1913		0.6	6.4
Pigalle		Paris (9th, 18th)	8 April 1911	Paris Metro Paris Metro Line 2	0.2	6.6
Saint-Georges		Paris (9th)	8 April 1911		0.5	7.1
Notre-Dame-de-Lorette		Paris (9th)	5 November 1910		0.4	7.5
Trinité–d'Estienne d'Orves		Paris (9th)	5 November 1910		0.4	7.9
Saint-Lazare		Paris (8th, 9th)	5 November 1910	(at Saint-Augustin) (at Haussmann–Saint-Lazare) (at Saint-Lazare)	0.5	8.4
Madeleine		Paris (1st, 8th, 9th)	5 November 1910	Paris Metro Paris Metro Line 8 Paris Metro Line 14	0.7	9.1
Concorde		Paris (1st, 8th)	5 November 1910	Paris Metro Paris Metro Line 1 Paris Metro Line 8	0.5	9.6
Assemblée Nationale		Paris (7th)	5 November 1910		0.6	10.2
Solférino; Musée d'Orsay		Paris (7th)	5 November 1910	(at Musée d'Orsay)	0.4	10.6
Rue du Bac		Paris (7th)	5 November 1910		0.4	11.0
Sèvres–Babylone		Paris (6th, 7th)	5 November 1910	Paris Metro Paris Metro Line 10	0.5	11.5
Rennes		Paris (6th)	5 November 1910 (Note: Closed in 1939 Reopened on 20 May 1968)		0.4	11.9
Notre-Dame-des-Champs		Paris (6th)	5 November 1910		0.4	12.3
Montparnasse–Bienvenüe		Paris (6th, 14th, 15th)	5 November 1910	(at Paris–Montparnasse)	0.5	12.8
Falguière		Paris (15th)	5 November 1910		0.5	13.3
Pasteur		Paris (15th)	5 November 1910	Paris Metro Paris Metro Line 6	0.4	13.7
Volontaires		Paris (15th)	5 November 1910		0.4	14.1
Vaugirard; Adolphe Chérioux		Paris (15th)	5 November 1910		0.5	14.6
Convention		Paris (15th)	5 November 1910		0.4	15.0
Porte de Versailles; Parc des Expositions de Paris		Paris (15th)	5 November 1910	Tramways in Île-de-France Île-de-France tramway Line 2 Île-de-France tramway Line 3a	0.8	15.8
Corentin Celton		Issy-les-Moulineaux	24 March 1934		0.9	16.7
Mairie d'Issy		Issy-les-Moulineaux	24 March 1934		0.6	17.3

=== Design features ===
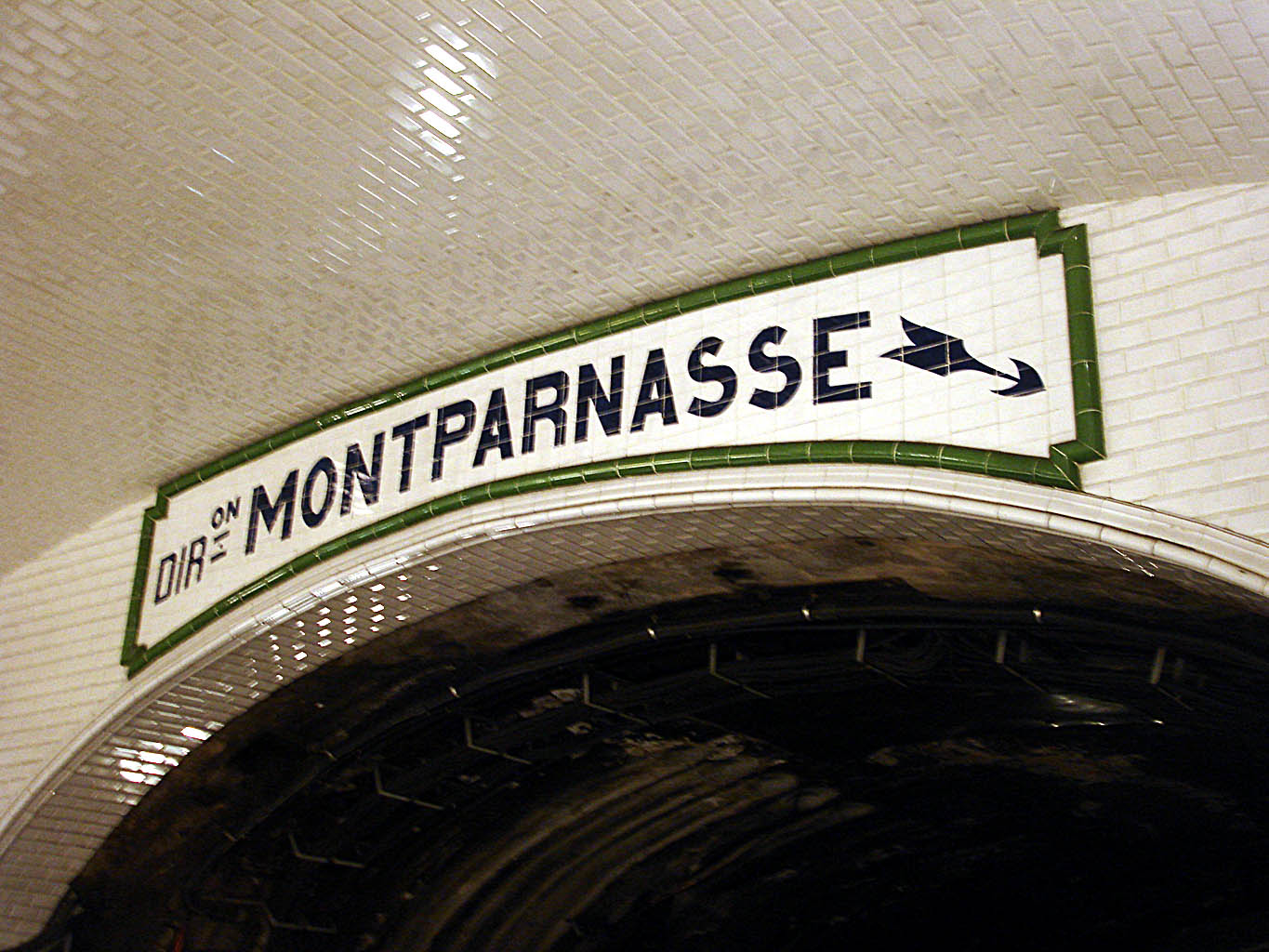
The headwall indicates the direction towards the terminus in all the stations of the Nord-Sud line, seen here at Sèvres – Babylone station

Because of competition with the CMP, the Nord-Sud company paid a special attention to design elements. One of the notable elements is the Saint-Lazare station in which architect Lucien Bechmann designed a rotunda for the tickets and transfer room. The station entrances of the Nord-Sud company, in ceramic and iron, are of a more sober styling than the Art Nouveau designs of Hector Guimard for the CMP's entrances. The word "Nord-Sud" appeared in white on red for the maximum visibility at a distance. In the 1970s, the Hector Guimard entrance from Hotel de Ville station was moved to Abbesses station.

The stations' supporting walls are vertical instead of vaulted, and the colored ceramic tiles carry the customary "NS" logo of the company. The tile trims are brown in stations without transfers, green in those with, and blue at Madeleine station because of its connection with the CMP network. In addition, on the stations' headwalls, an additional signage indicates the direction of the trains entering said tunnel. All stations on the line inside Paris had this signage, though some have disappeared in renovations over the years. At each station between Solférino and Notre-Dame des Champs (except Rue du Bac), the signages indicate either "DIR^{ON} MONTPARNASSE" or "DIR^{ON} MONTMARTRE". Marcadet – Poissonniers, Lamarck – Caulaincourt and Abbesses stations' headwalls indicate either "DIR^{ON} PTE de VERSAILLES" or "DIR^{ON} PTE de LA CHAPELLE". Falguière, since it's beyond Montparnasse, indicates "DIR^{ON} PTE de VERSAILLES"/"DIR^{ON} MONTMARTRE".

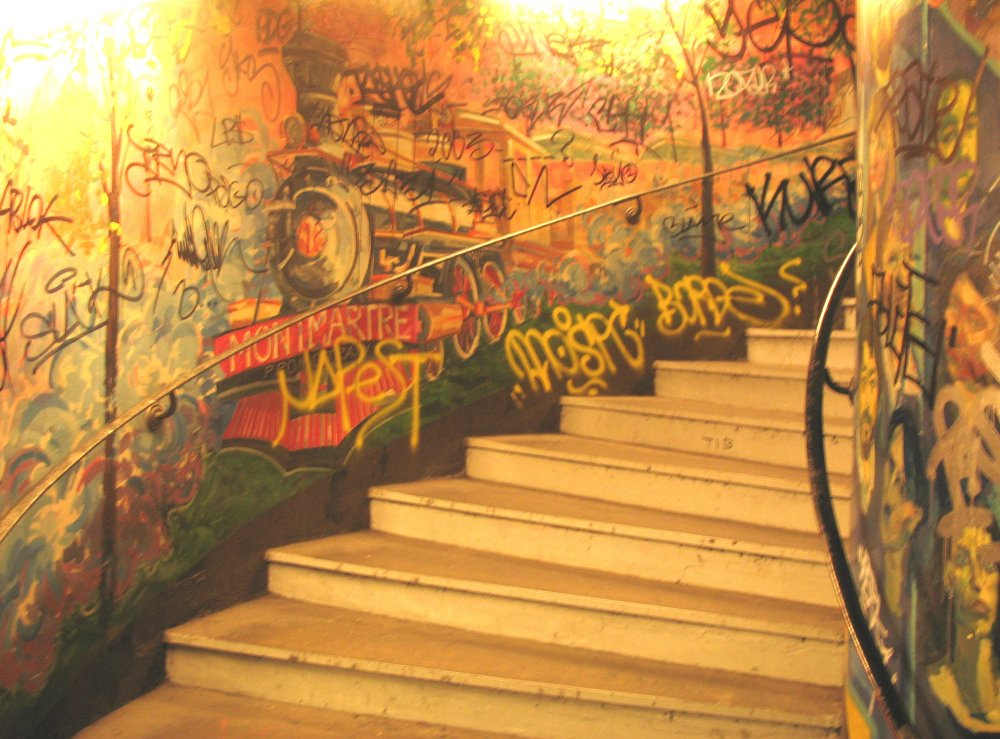
Graffiti at Abbesses station. The walls have since been re-painted

Due to their depth underground the surface of Butte Montmarte, Abbesses and Lamarck – Caulaincourt both have lifts. Five stations have unique décor, each based around a single theme: Abbesses, Concorde, Assemblée nationale, Montparnasse – Bienvenüe, and Pasteur.

Abbesses station can be accessed via two shafts : One for the lifts, the other for the stairs decorated with famous sights in Montmartre such as the Moulin Rouge, Sacré Coeur or place des Abbesses while descending, as well as depictions of nature and daily life while ascending. This installation was painted in 2007 to replace a mosaic patchwork previously done by artists from the area, which had been vandalised over the years.

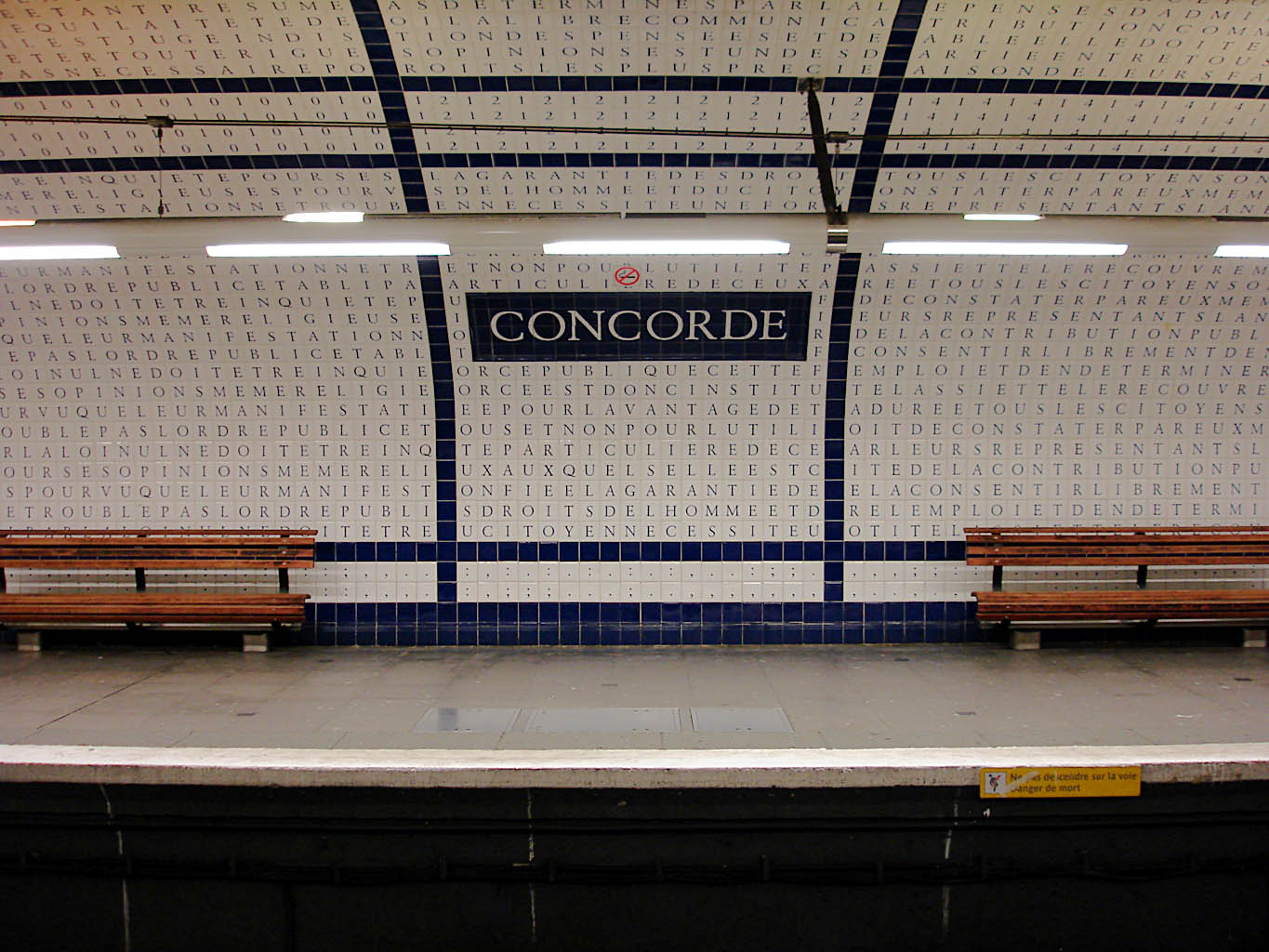
Representation at Concorde station of the Declaration of the Rights of Man and of the Citizen

Concorde station was renovated in the early 1990s, it is decorated with small ceramic tiles, each depicting a different letter from the Déclaration des droits de l'homme et du citoyen de 1789, the design was conceived by Françoise Schein.

Since 1990, Assemblée nationale station no longer carries election material, but the posters show heads in silhouette, representing the deputies of the French national assembly. It was designed by Jean-Charles Blais and is regularly refreshed according to the parliamentary calendar.

Montparnasse – Bienvenüe station is named after its location and the founding father of the Metropolitan system in Paris, Fulgence Bienvenüe. Thus it was a natural choice for an exhibition on the technology and literature of the metro, in celebration of its centenary in 2000. Extracts from works about the Metro adorn the walls of its corridors.

Pasteur station has an exhibition dedicated to medicine, installed during the centenary of the Metro and the renovation of the station on Line 6. The panels depict the evolution of biology and medicine since Louis Pasteur, in the context of the time, and with various anecdotes.

=== Renamed stations ===
Date	Former name	New name	Notes
30 October 1912	Pecqueur	Lamarck	Name changed before the line's opening : The station's only entrance is located on rue Lamarck while the station itself is under place Pecqueur.
????	Lamarck	Lamarck – Caulaincourt	It isn't clear when the Caulaincourt name was added to the station's name.
1923	Sèvres - Croix Rouge	Sèvres – Babylone	Due to rivalry between Nord-Sud and CMP, a settlement name was forced by the city of Paris on both stations.
25 August 1931	Poissoniers	Marcadet – Poissoniers	fusion with Marcadet on line 4 following Nord-Sud buyout in 1930.
6 October 1942	Montparnasse	Montparnasse – Bienvenüe	as a homage to Fulgence Bienvenüe, founding father of the Paris Métro.
May 1945	Trinité	Trinité – D'Estienne D'Orves	after a French resistant executed by the nazis on 29 August 1941.
15 October 1945	Petits Ménages	Corentin Celton	also after a French resistant executed by the nazis, and who worked at the eponymous nearby hospital.
1 May 1946	Torcy	Marx Dormoy	after a communist politician murdered by the far-right
30 June 1989	Chambre des Députés	Asemblée Nationale	after the lower house's name change

== Operation ==
=== Service ===
A MF67 train leaves the Sèvres-Babylone station (Video)

In 2011, the end to end journey time was 35 minutes southwards and 36 minutes northwards. As with all Metro lines, the first trains leave at 05:30, from both termini as well as an additional departure from Porte de Versailles station for a headstart north.

On most days, the last northbound train leaves Mairie d’Issy station at 00:39. The last southbound trains leave Porte de la Chapelle station at 00:39 and 00:42, the second terminating at Porte de Versailles station. On Fridays and Saturdays, the final departures are at 01:39. The train frequency is every two to four minutes during the day, and five to seven minutes in the late evening. The frequency on Sundays is four to six minutes. After 00:30 on Friday and Saturday evenings and bank holidays, the interval between trains is 10 minutes.

The RATP employs two categories of staff: ticketing agents and drivers. The former manage the stations, sell tickets and look after passengers. Drivers are responsible for the operation of the trains.

=== Rolling stock ===
At its inception Line 12 operated four-motor Sprague-Thomson trains, equipped with 600 volt pantographs and scrubbers, the overhead system which supplies the trains with electricity. After the integration of the line into the CMP network, the overhead lines and pantographs were removed. The trains remained unique, using a grey and blue colour scheme for the 2nd class cars and red and yellow for 1st class until 1972.

When Line 7 was modernised with new MF 67 stock between 1971 and 1973, its old Sprague-Thomson trains were transferred to Line 12 to replenish the worn out equipment from the Nord-Sud company. The last train was replaced in May 1972. Line 12 continued to use the Sprague-Thomson equipment for another six years, until 1978, when it was provided with new MF 67 stock.

Intermittently, the MF 2000 stock trains were tested along the Line 12 corridor around the time of their arrival on lines 2, 5 and 9. It is unclear whether they had been thought of for line 12, or not.

Between 2028 and 2030, the MF 67 trains will be progressively replaced by new MF 19 trains, currently in deployment on line 10.

=== Workshops ===
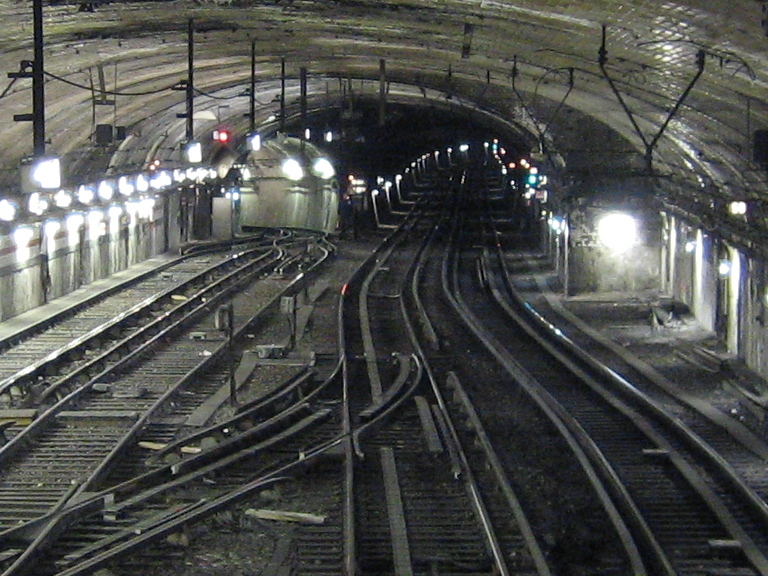
The tunnel on the left leads to the Vaugirard workshop

Line 12's rolling stock is maintained at the Vaugirard workshop, situated underground in the 15th arrondissement of Paris between the rues Croix-Nivert, Desnouettes and Lecourbe, and Lycée Louis-Armand. They connect with the main line on the tunnels toward the Mairie d'Issy station, north until the Porte de Versailles station. It is also connected to the Petite Ceinture, a minor disused railway, by tracks which cross Rue Desnouettes.

As with all rolling stock on the system, heavy maintenance, such as the replacement of worn parts (batteries, paint, springs, etc.), happens at the Choisy workshops. Opened in 1931, the Choisy workshops are underground in the 13th arrondissement, close to the Boulevard Périphérique, and accessible via a fork in line 7 at Porte d'Ivry station. There are two parts, one for maintenance of carriages of Line 7, the other for repairs on trains from all lines on the network. The workshops cover an area of approximately 3.435 hectares (34,350 m^{2}) and were staffed by 330 workmen in 2007.

=== Traffic ===
Line 12's traffic load is about average for the Métro; the total number of travellers is less than half that of Line 1 and approximately two-thirds of lines 6 and 13. From 1992 to 2004, traffic grew by 0.5%, the 11th (of 13) strongest in terms of traffic growth (excluding Line 14, completed in 1998).

Year	1992	1993	1994	1995 (Note: Due to strikes in December 1995)	1996	1997	1998	1999	2000	2001	2002	2003	2004
Number of travellers (in millions) (Note: Total number of journeys, direct entrances and RER transfers.)	71.7	69.3	68.6	59.6	63.3	64.6	67.6	69.8	73.6	73.8	74.4	70.9	72.1

The busiest stations are Saint-Lazare (34.53 million) and Montparnasse – Bienvenüe (29.46 million), both of which serve multiple lines. In 1998, average weekday traffic reached, 245,364 commuters, 162,937 on Saturday and 93,866 on Sunday.

== Future ==
=== Northern extension ===
After the first phase of the extension to Front Populaire, and the second phase to Mairie d'Aubervilliers, the final plan sees the extension running all the way to RER B at La Courneuve, where the SDRIF plans an ultimate terminus at the Six-Routes hub, for connection with subway lines 16 and 17, as well as Tramway Line 1. The line 12 tunnel after Mairie d'Aubervilliers goes all the way to the train station's surroundings, yet no station infrastructure has been built.

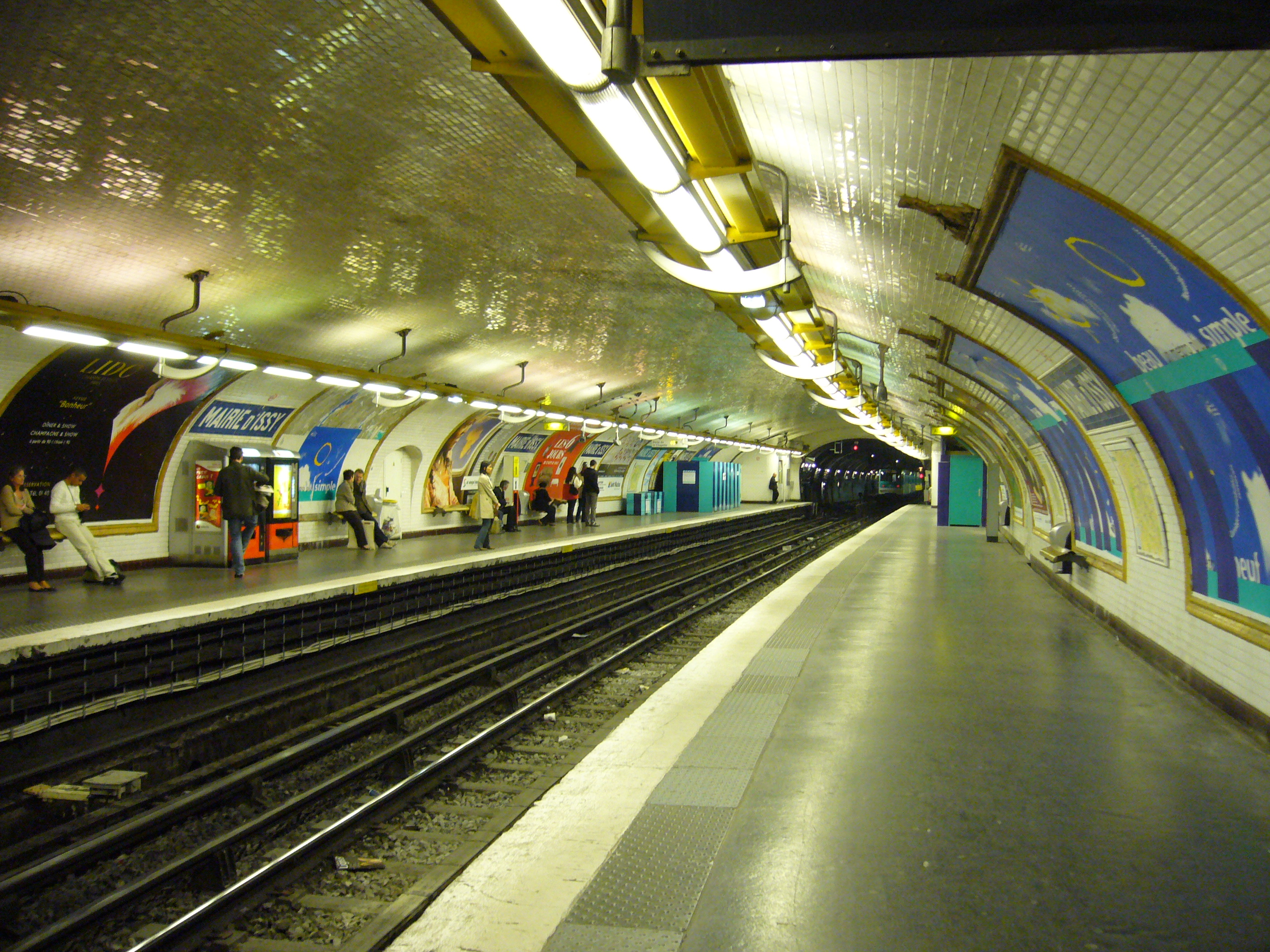
Mairie d'Issy. The southern extension would start from the transfer tracks visible on the back.

=== Southern extension ===
A southern extension into the municipality of Issy-les-Moulineaux is envisaged. Discussed at length since the last extension of the line to Mairie d'Issy in 1934, it would run at least up to Gare d'Issy – located about half a kilometer away from the line's actual train sidings – or possibly all the way to Les Moulineaux thus permitting transfers with Tramway T2 and creating the Issy-Ville station, in connection with RER Line C and the new rocade Métro line 15 in the area. The project was included in phases 2 or 3 of the Île-de-France regional master plan (SDRIF) adopted on 25 September 2008, with an expected start in 2014 or 2020. The arrival of Métro line 15, expected for late 2025, further pushes the project's utility. Despite this, pushes from both cities of Issy-les-Moulineaux and Meudon-sur-Seine, which also endorses the expansion project that could serve its territory as well, as well as a confirmation from the region president Valérie Pécresse on 29 May 2021 : No clear calendar nor precise layout for the Line 12's extension, is set today.

The line's onboard diagram, featuring both aforementioned extensions.

== See also ==
- Paris
- Transport in Paris
- List of stations of the Paris Métro
- List of stations of the Paris RER
- List of metro systems
- Rail transport in France

== Bibliography ==
- Berton, Claude; Ossadzow, Alexandre; Filloles, Christiane (2006). Fulgence Bienvenüe et la construction du métropolitain de Paris (in French) (2 ed.). Presses des Ponts. ISBN 978-2-85978-422-5.
- Doury, François (2007). Les coulisses du Métro de Paris: ateliers et voiries [The metro of Paris behind the scenes – Workshops and maintenance]. Éd. Men at Work. ISBN 978-2-9529367-0-5.
- Fourcaut, Annie; Bellanger, Emmanuel; Flonneau, Mathieu (2007). Paris-banlieues, conflits et solidarités: historiographie, anthologie, chronologie, 1788–2006 [Suburbs of Paris, conflicts and solidarities: historiography, anthology, chronology, 1788–2006] (in French). creaphis editions. ISBN 978-2-913610-97-2.
- Gasnault, François; Zuber, Henri, eds. (1997). Métro-Cité : le chemin de fer métropolitain à la conquête de Paris, 1871–1945 [Metro-city : the conquest of Paris by the rapid transit trains] (in French). Paris: Musées de la ville de Paris. ISBN 2-87900-374-1.
- Guerrand, Roger-Henri (1999). L'aventure du métropolitain (in French). Paris: La découverte. ISBN 978-2-7071-3111-9.
- Hardy, Brian (1999). Paris Metro Handbook (3 ed.). Capital Transport Publishing. ISBN 1-85414-212-7.
- Jacobs, Gaston (2001). Le métro de Paris : un siècle de matériel roulant [The metro of Paris: one century of rolling stock] (in French). Éditions La Vie du Rail. ISBN 2-902808-97-6.
- Lamming, Clive (2001). Métro insolite [Unusual metro] (in French). Paris: Parigramme. ISBN 978-2-84096-190-1.
- Marrey, Bernard; Hammoutène, Franck (1999). Le béton à Paris [Concrete in Paris] (in French). Editions du Pavillon de l'Arsenal. ISBN 978-2-907513-63-0.
- Ovenden, Mark (2008). Pepinster, Julian; Lloyd, Peter B. (eds.). Paris Métro Style in map and station design. Capital Transport Publishing. ISBN 978-1-85414-322-8.
- Robert, Jean (1983). Notre Métro [Our metro] (in French). OCLC 461957199.
- Ström, Marianne (1994). Métro-art et Métro-poles [Metro-art in the Metro-polis] (in French). ACR Edition. ISBN 978-2-86770-065-1.
- Tricoire, Jean (1999a). Un siècle de métro en 14 lignes. De Bienvenüe à Météor [A century of the Metro in 14 lines. From Bienvenüe to Météor] (in French). Paris: Éditions La Vie du Rail. ISBN 2-915034-32-X.
- Tricoire, Jean (1999b). Le métro de Paris – 1899 – 1911 : images de la construction [The metro of Paris – 1899–1911: pictures from the building site] (in French). Paris: Paris Musées. ISBN 2-87900-481-0.
- Zuber, Henri (1996). Le patrimoine de la RATP [The Patrimony of the RATP] (in French). éditions Flohic. ISBN 2-84234-007-8.
