= Front Populaire station =

Paris Métro station

Aubervilliers - Saint-Denis Front Populaire
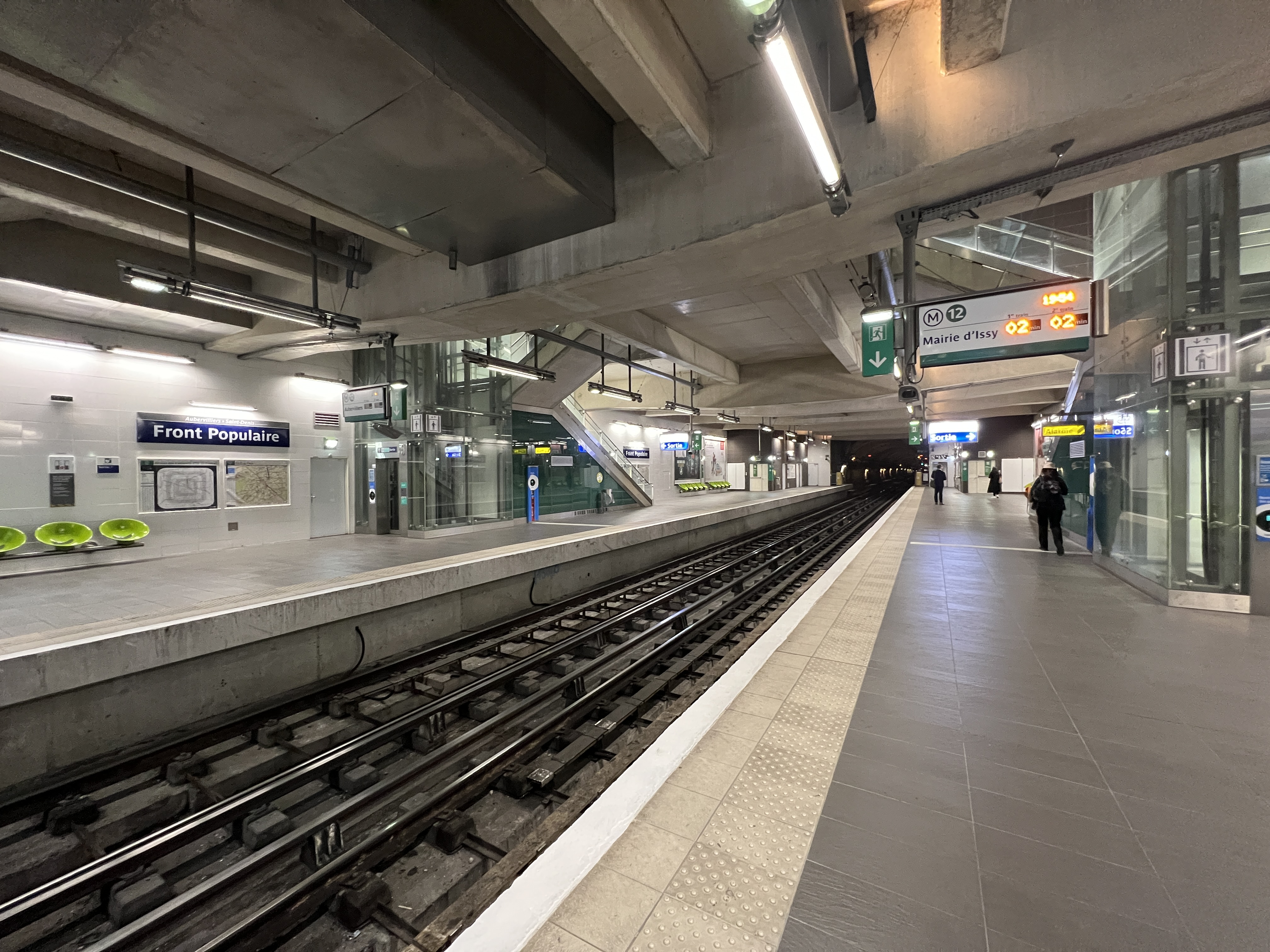
- Platforms

General information
- Other names: Proudhon–Gardinoux (during planning)
- Location: Aubervilliers/Saint-Denis, Seine-Saint-Denis; Île-de-France; France
- Coordinates: 48°54′24″N 2°21′58″E
- System: Paris Métro station
- Owner: RATP
- Operator: RATP
- Line: Paris Metro Paris Metro Line 12
- Platforms: 2 (side platforms)
- Tracks: 2

Construction
- Depth: 20 m (66 ft)
- Accessible: yes

Other information
- Station code: FPO
- Fare zone: 2

History
- Opened: 18 December 2012

Passengers
- 1,948,542 (2021)

Services
Preceding station	Paris Metro	Following station
Porte de la Chapelle towards Mairie d'Issy	Line 12	Aimé Césaire towards Mairie d'Aubervilliers
Location
- Location within Paris

Front Populaire ([fʁɔ̃ pɔpylɛːʁ]) is a station on Line 12 of the Paris Métro. Located in Aubervilliers on the border with Saint-Denis, the station is named in honour of the Popular Front, a coalition of left-wing parties that governed France from 1936 to 1938. It was the 301st station on the network to open, entering service on 18 December 2012 as the new northern terminus of Line 12.

== History ==
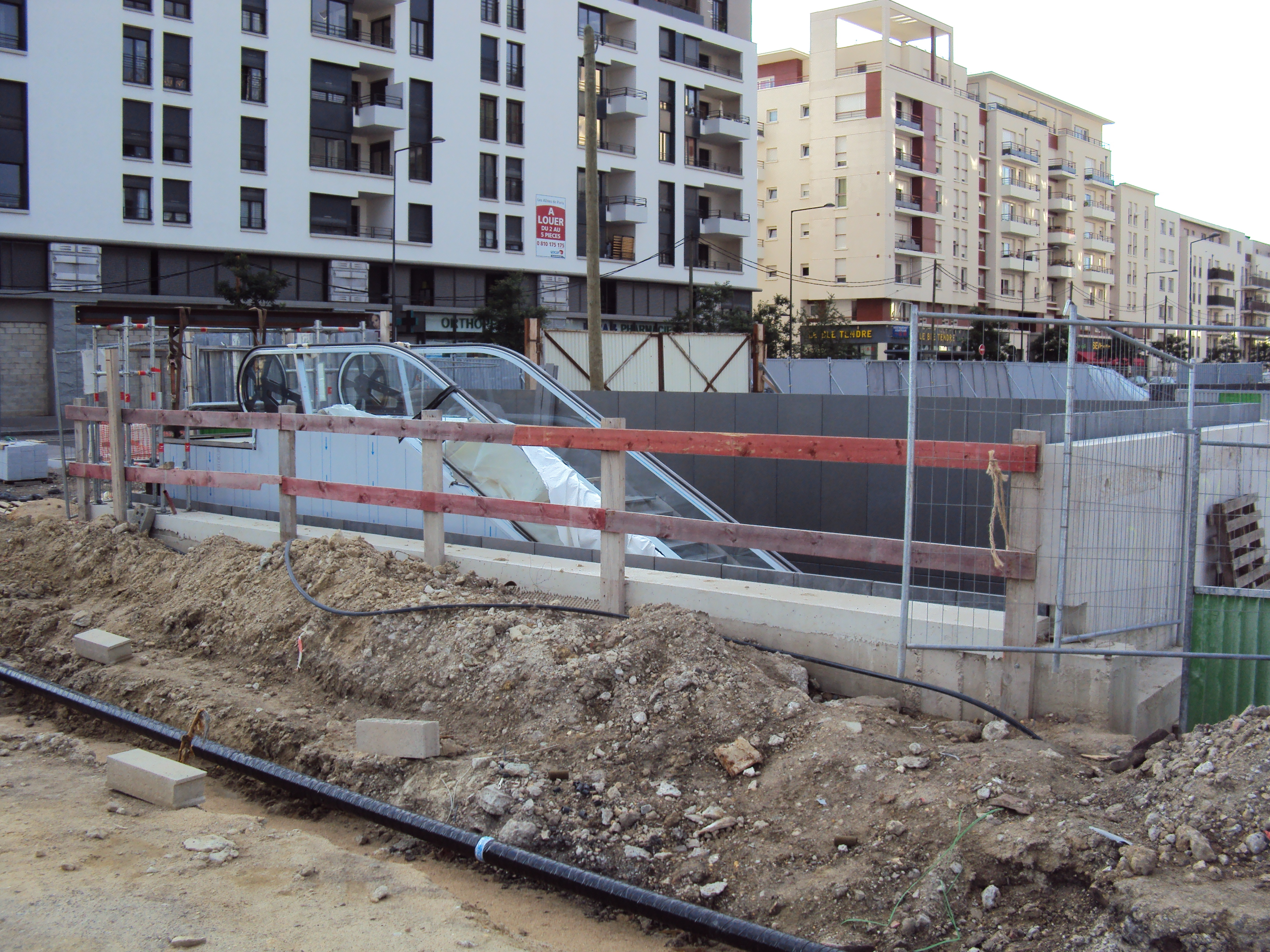
Construction in July 2012

Line 12 began operating on 5 November 1910 from Porte de Versailles to Notre-Dame-de-Lorette. During its construction, an extension to the north was planned and provisions were made at the end of the tunnels. These provisions were used in the 1960s for the construction of the A1 autoroute, putting an end to the possibility of using it for the line's extension.

Towards the end of the 1990s, when the fourth Contrat de plan État-région (2000-2006) was released, an extension of line 12 was included in the plan to provide métro service to the communes of Saint-Denis and Aubervilliers. Consultations began in 2001 and public inquiries were conducted from 10 June 2003 until 11 July 2003 to determine the construction details and location of the station, with the declaration of public utility occurring on 8 June 2004. The station was part of the Paris bid for the 2012 Summer Olympics.

=== Construction ===
Construction broke ground on 25 June 2008. The station was built by open-air excavation sheltered by diaphragm walls where the walls were built before excavation of the station box to prevent the ground from collapsing inwards. By the end of 2009, the platform walls and mezzanine were completed. On 15 July 2010, the tunnel boring machine, Élodie, reached the station from pont de Stains, then continuing its way towards Boulevard Périphérique, where the exit shaft was located in September 2010. In order to enter the station, a submerged drilling technique was employed; the station was flooded before the tunnel boring machine pierced a specially designed watertight diaphragm wall. The first escalator was installed on 3 February 2012.

=== Opening ===
The station opened as part of the first phase of the extension of line 12 from Porte de la Chapelle to Mairie d’Aubervilliers on 18 December 2012, although the tunnels had already been completed to Mairie d’Aubervilliers. The station was the northern terminus of line 12 until the second phase of the extension to Mairie d'Aubervilliers opened on 31 May 2022.

In 2019, the station was used by 2,802,852 passengers, making it the 190th busiest of the Métro network out of 302 stations. In 2021, the station was used by 1,948,542 passengers, making it the 183rd busiest of the Métro network out of 305 stations.

== Naming ==
During development and construction, the station was known as Proudhon–Gardinoux, after Rue Proudhon (named for Pierre-Joseph Proudhon, the "father of anarchism") and Rue des Gardinoux.

In 2011, Syndicat des transports d'Île-de-France agreed that the station would be known as Front Populaire, named after the nearby Place du Front Populaire in Aubervilliers. This would honour Front Populaire, a coalition of left-wing parties that governed France from 1936 to 1938.

The station has a subtitle of Aubervilliers - Saint-Denis, denoting its location on the border between the two communes.

== Passenger services ==
As with all new metro stations since 1992, the station is fully accessible.

=== Access ===
The station has 3 accesses:

- Access 1: rue Léon Blum (with a lift)
- Access 2: rue Waldeck Rochet Campus Condorcet
- Access 3: avenue George Sand

=== Station layout ===
Street Level
B1	Mezzanine
Platform level	Side platform, doors will open on the right
Platform level	Southbound	← toward Mairie d'Issy (Porte de la Chapelle)
Platform level	Northbound	toward Mairie d'Aubervilliers (Aimé Césaire) →
Platform level	Side platform, doors will open on the right

=== Platforms ===
The station has a standard configuration with 2 tracks surrounded by 2 side platforms.

=== Other connections ===
The station is also served by lines 139, 239, and 302 of the RATP bus network. The station could also be served in the future by Île-de-France tramway Line 8 when it is extended from Saint-Denis–Porte de Paris to Rosa Parks.

== Gallery ==
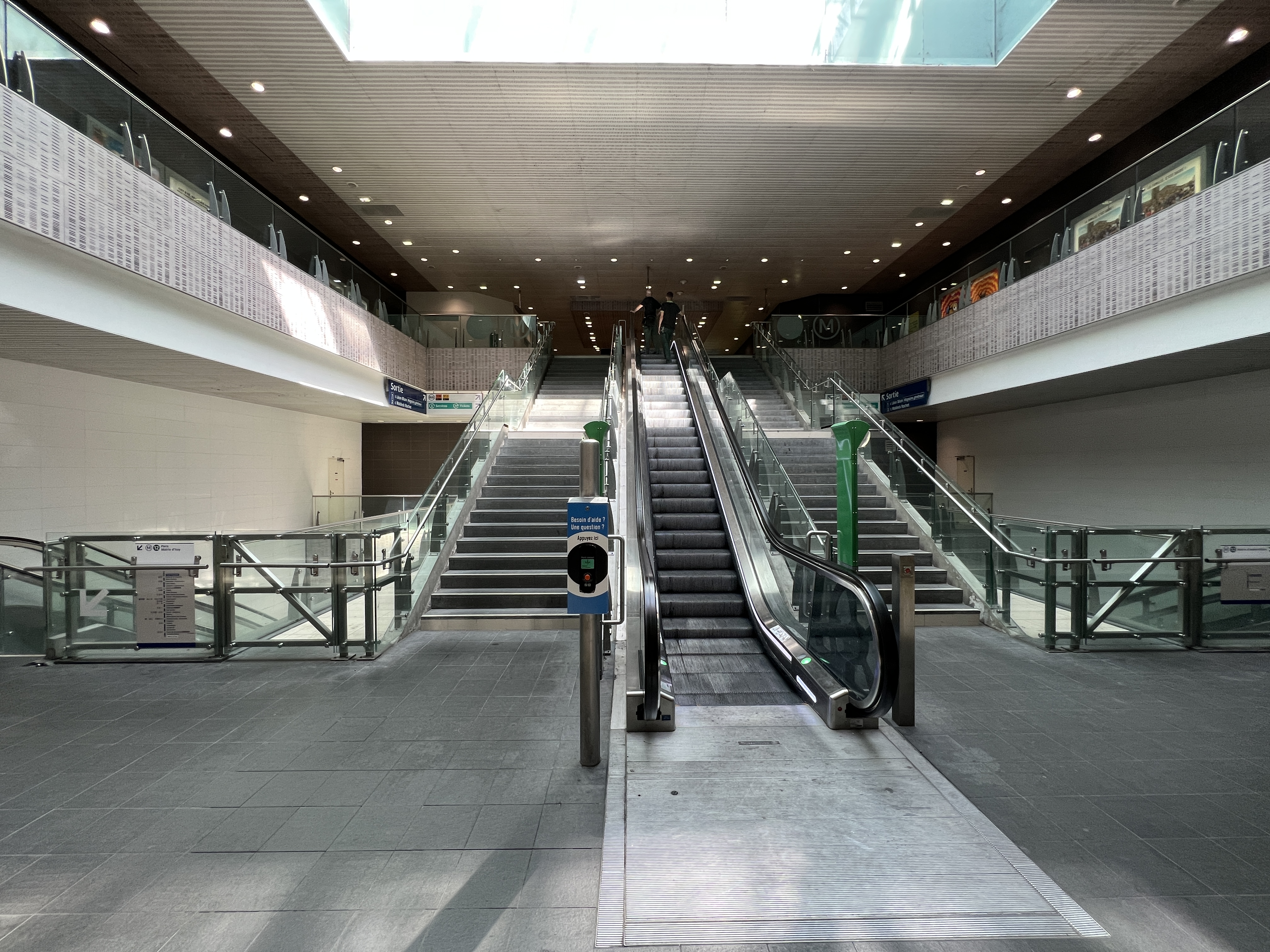
Escalators at the station

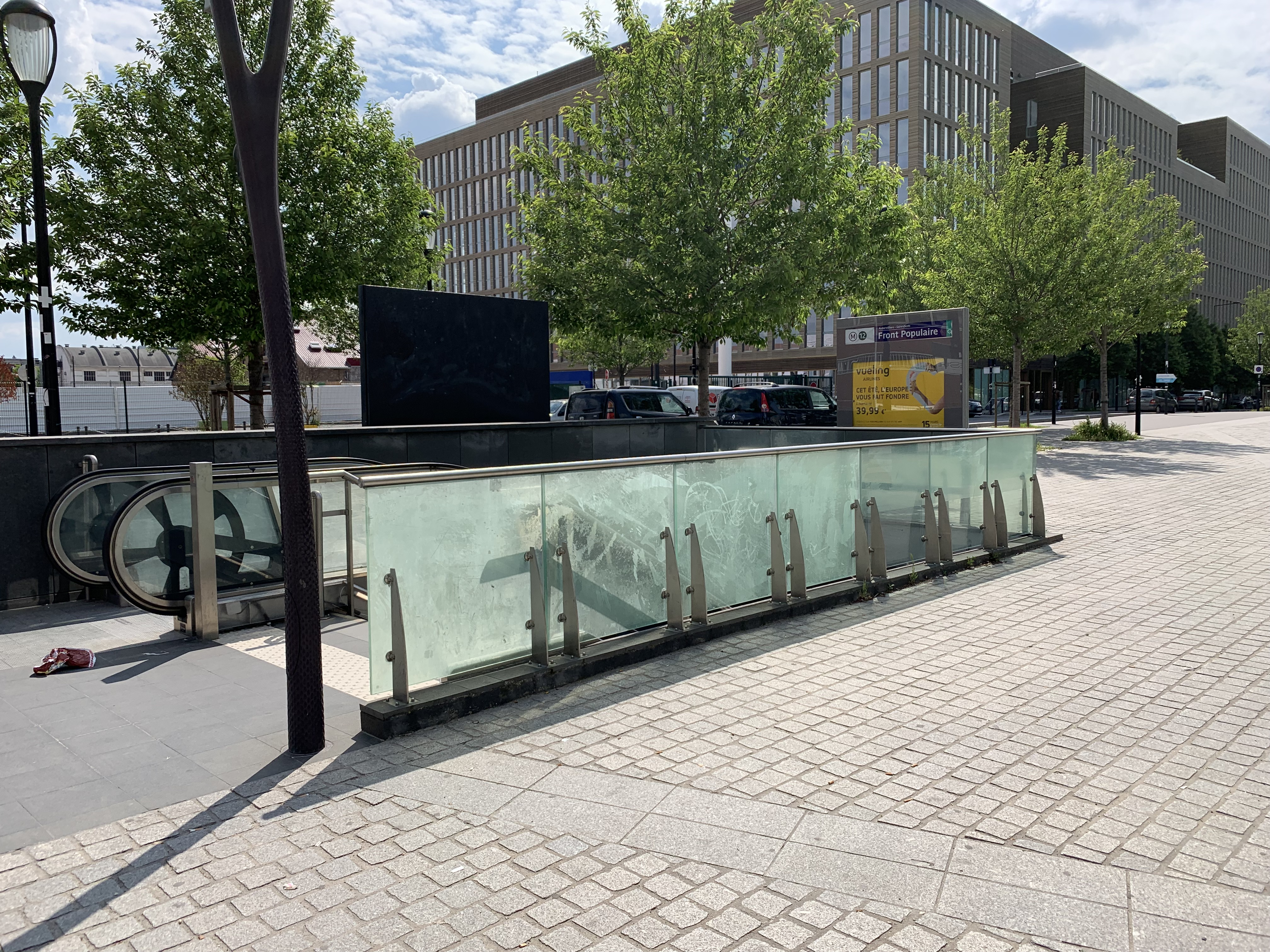
One of the accesses

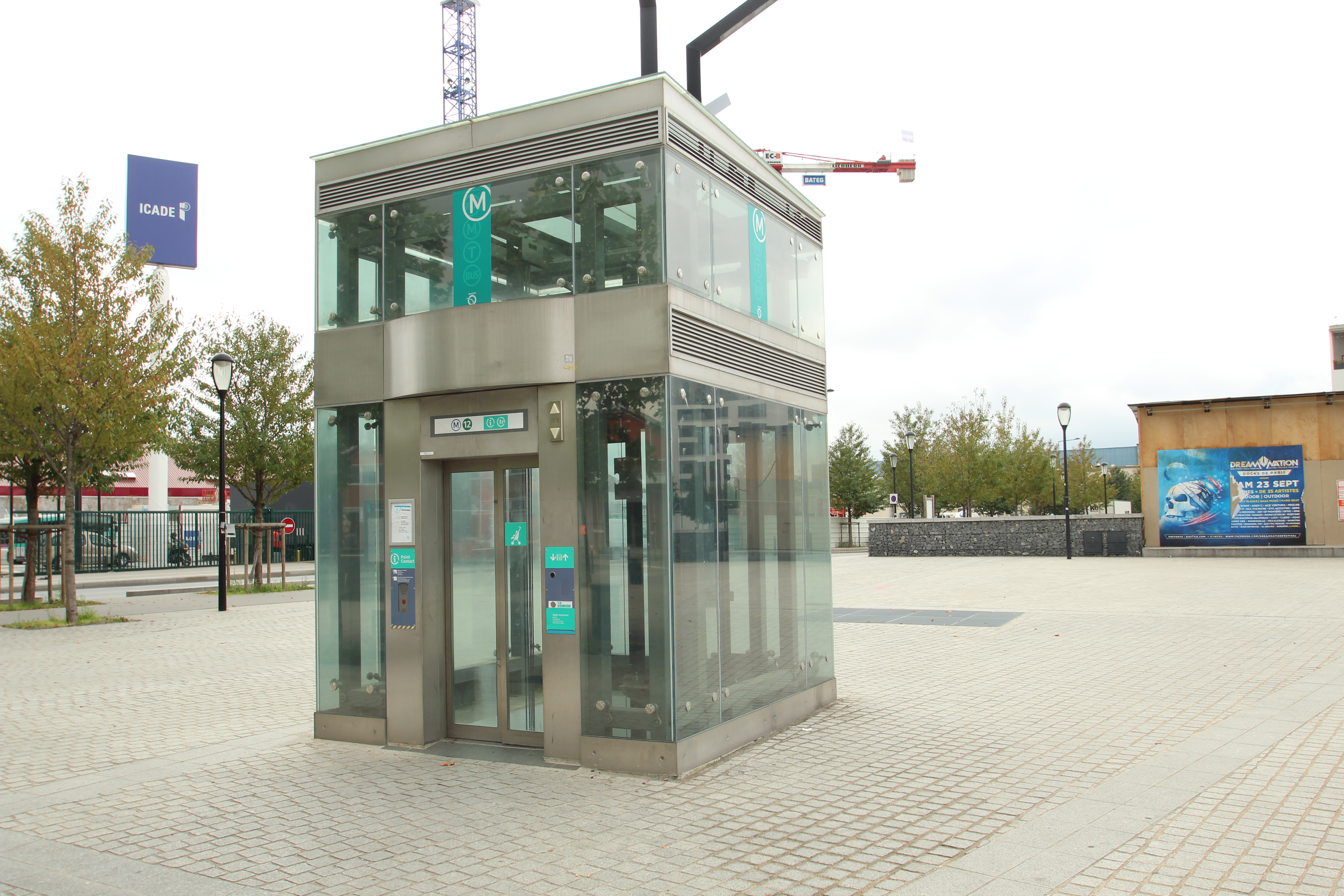
Lift at access 1

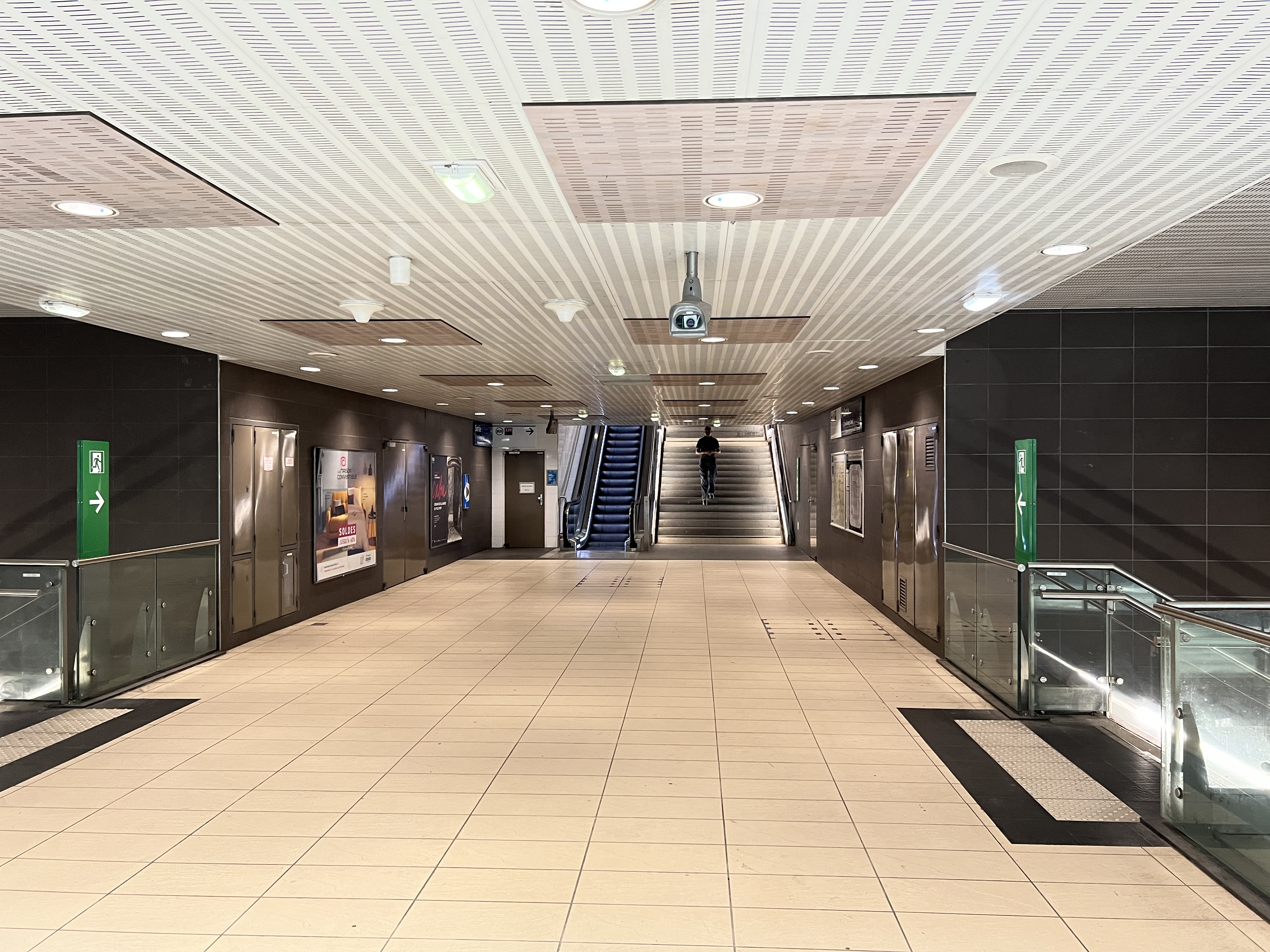
Mezzanine

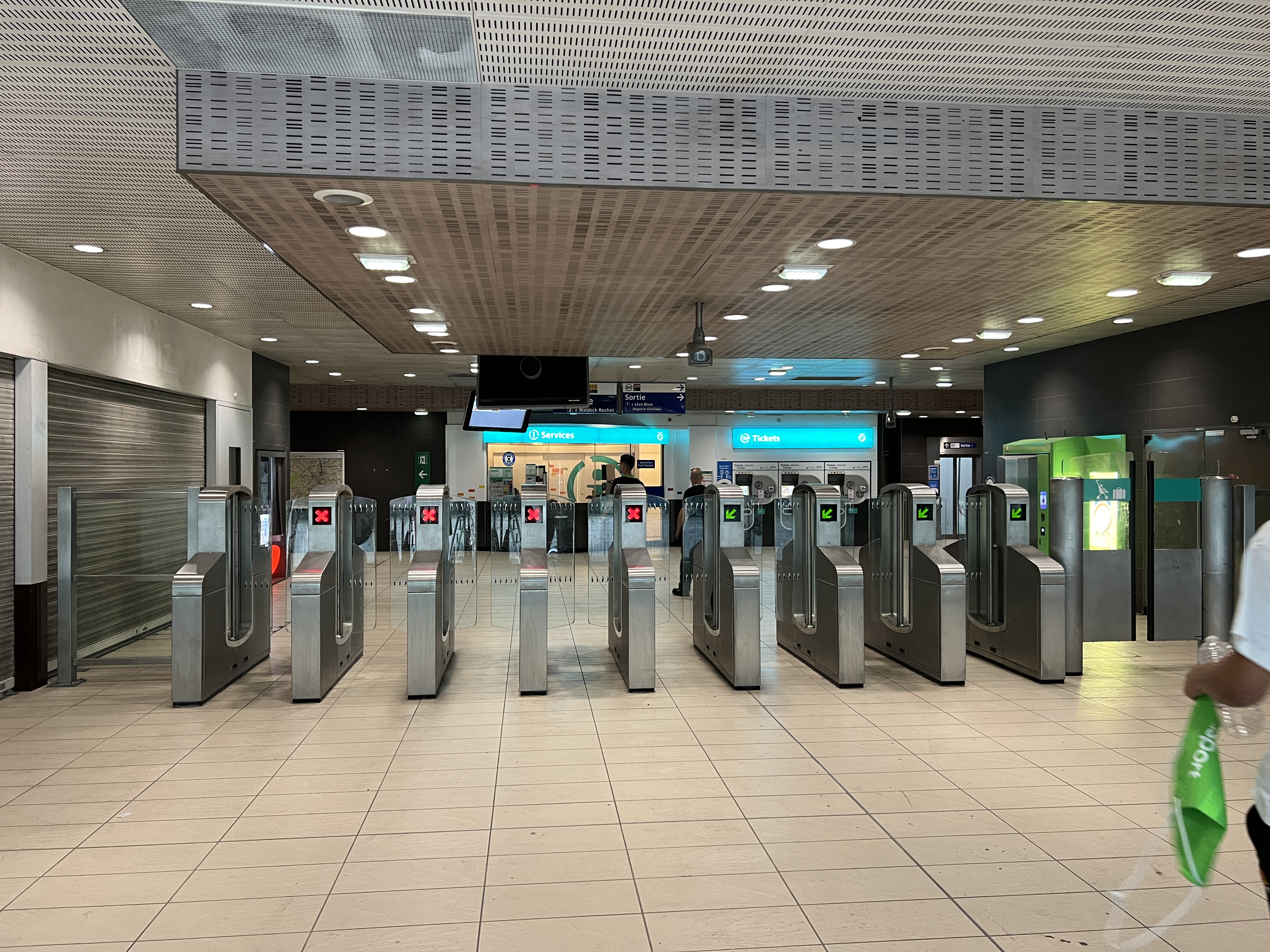
Ticket barriers

== See also ==
- List of stations of the Paris Métro
