= Aimé Césaire station =

Metro station in Paris, France

Aimé Césaire
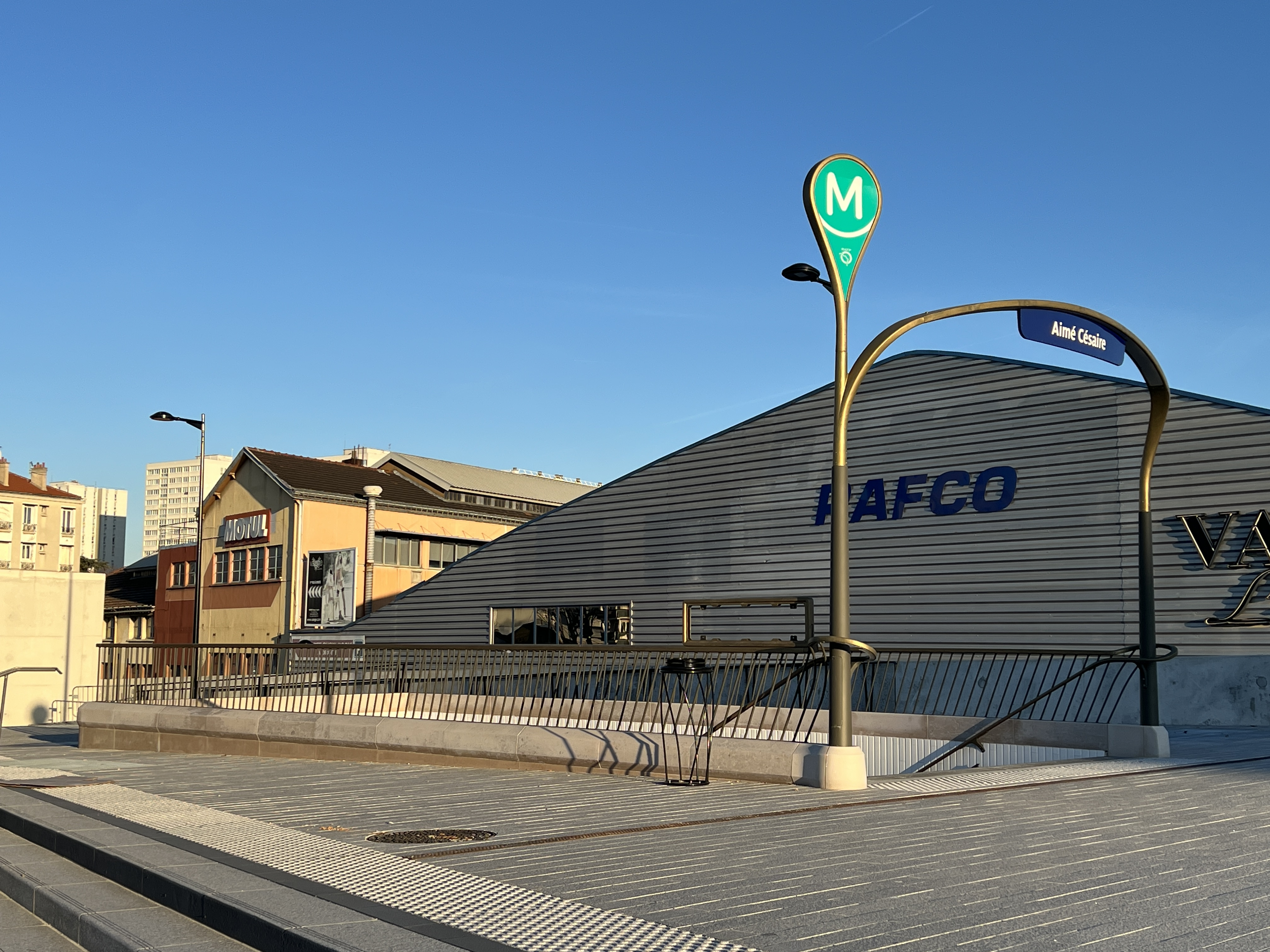

General information
- Other names: Pont de Stains (during planning)
- Location: Aubervilliers, Seine-Saint-Denis; Île-de-France; France
- Coordinates: 48°54′30″N 2°22′41″E
- System: Paris Métro station
- Owner: RATP
- Operator: RATP
- Line: Paris Metro Paris Metro Line 12
- Platforms: 2 (2 side platforms)
- Tracks: 2

Construction
- Depth: 22 m
- Accessible: Yes
- Architect: LIN (Finn Geipel and Giulia Andi)

Other information
- Status: Open
- Fare zone: 2

History
- Opened: 31 May 2022

Services
Preceding station	Paris Metro	Following station
Front Populaire towards Mairie d'Issy	Line 12	Mairie d'Aubervilliers Terminus
Location
- Location within Paris

Aimé Césaire (French pronunciation: [ɛme sezɛʁ]) is a station on line 12 of the Paris Métro. The station is located at Place Henri-Rol-Tanguy in Aubervilliers. It is named in honour of the French Martinican poet Aimé Césaire. It was the 307th station to open.

== History ==
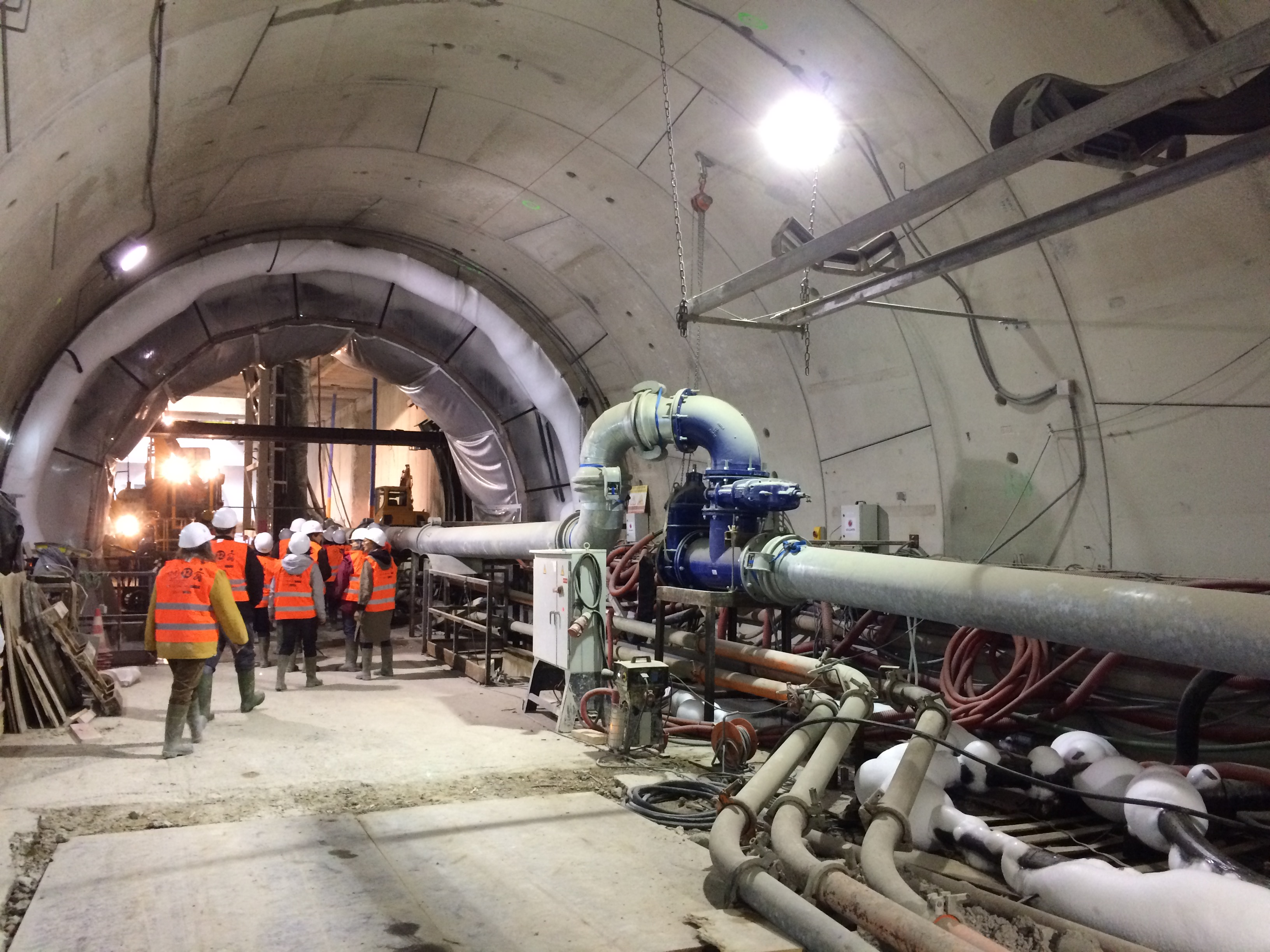
Construction in 2017

Towards the end of the 1990s, when the fourth Contrat de plan État-région (2000-2006) was released, an extension of line 12 was included in the plan to provide metro service to the communes of Saint-Denis and Aubervilliers. Consultations began in 2001 and public inquiries were conducted from 10 June 2003 until 11 July 2003 to determine the construction details and location of the stations, with the declaration of public utility occurring on 8 June 2004.

Construction of the tunnel began in September 2009. By 2011, the tunnel boring machine, Élodie reached the Boulevard Périphérique, where the exit shaft was located. The first phase of the extension was completed on 18 December 2012, with the opening of the station at Front Populaire. With the tunnel completed, the second phase of the extension would involve the construction of two stations at a later date.

Construction of the second phase of the extension began in the autumn of 2014, with its opening initially being scheduled for 2017. The opening date was eventually pushed back to mid-2019, then again to spring 2022 due to various administrative and technical problems as well as the COVID-19 pandemic. The station opened as part of the 2.8km second phase of the extension of line 12 from Porte de la Chapelle to Mairie d’Aubervilliers on 31 May 2022. The station is expected to handle around 15,000 passengers a day.

=== Naming ===
After the death of French Martinican poet Aimé Césaire in 2008, officials wanted to name a métro station after him. Jean-Christophe Lagarde, then the mayor of Drancy, proposed that Proudhon-Gardinoux station (later Front Populaire) be named after Césaire, however the request was turned down by the RATP due to odonymic requirements for the naming of métro stations. STIF then decided to name the station Front Populaire in 2011.

This station was initially called Pont de Stains, after a nearby bridge, but was renamed to Aimé Césaire, with reference to the nearby square Aimé Césaire that was inaugurated on 6 July 2008.

== Architecture and artwork ==
The station was designed by LIN (Finn Geipel and Giulia Andi). The design uses white corrugated metal panels on the walls, and large circular light fittings – a similar concept was also used at Barbara and Bagneux–Lucie Aubrac stations on Line 4. The station's external accesses and surroundings were designed by Marc Aurel, with fine curves made of brass.

The exterior façade of the station features a fresco on glass panels, featuring excerpts from Aimé Césaire's work, such as illustrations, motifs, and quotes from his poems or past interviews, reflecting his favourite themes in his work: Martinique, Africa, and nature. It was produced by graphic designers Hermine Poitou and Catherine Félix.

== Passenger services ==
=== Access ===
The station has 3 accesses:

- Access 1: Canal Saint-Denis
- Access 2: Pont de Stains
- Access 3: Boulevard Félix Faure

=== Station layout ===
Street Level
B1	Mezzanine
Line 12platforms	Side platform, doors will open on the right
Line 12platforms	Southbound	← toward Mairie d'Issy (Front Populaire)
Line 12platforms	Northbound	toward Mairie d'Aubervilliers (Terminus) →
Line 12platforms	Side platform, doors will open on the right

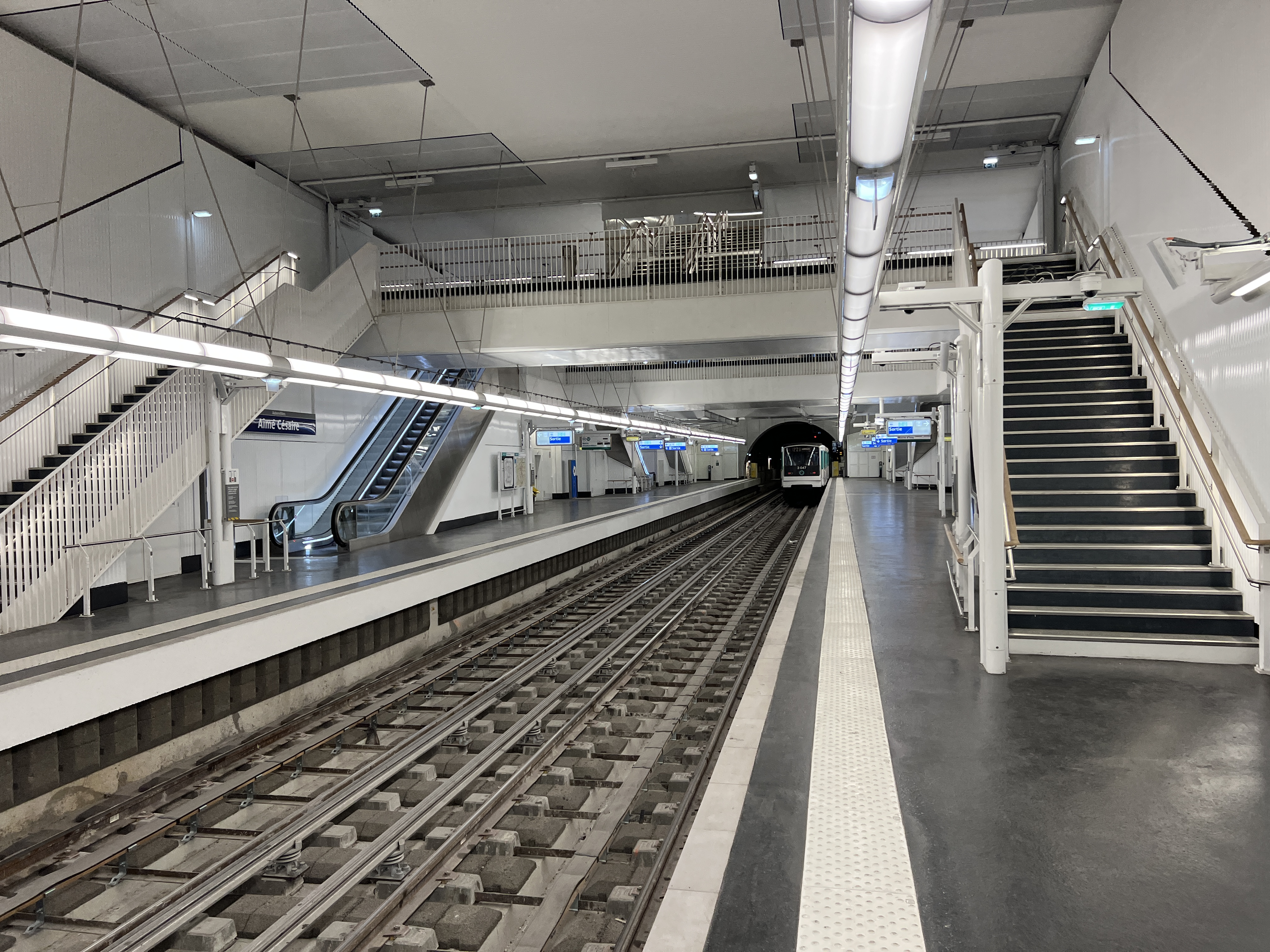
MF 67 departing Aimé Césaire

=== Platforms ===
The station has a standard configuration with 2 tracks surrounded by 2 side platforms.

=== Other connections ===
The station is also served by lines 35, 45, and 139 of the RATP bus network.

== Gallery ==
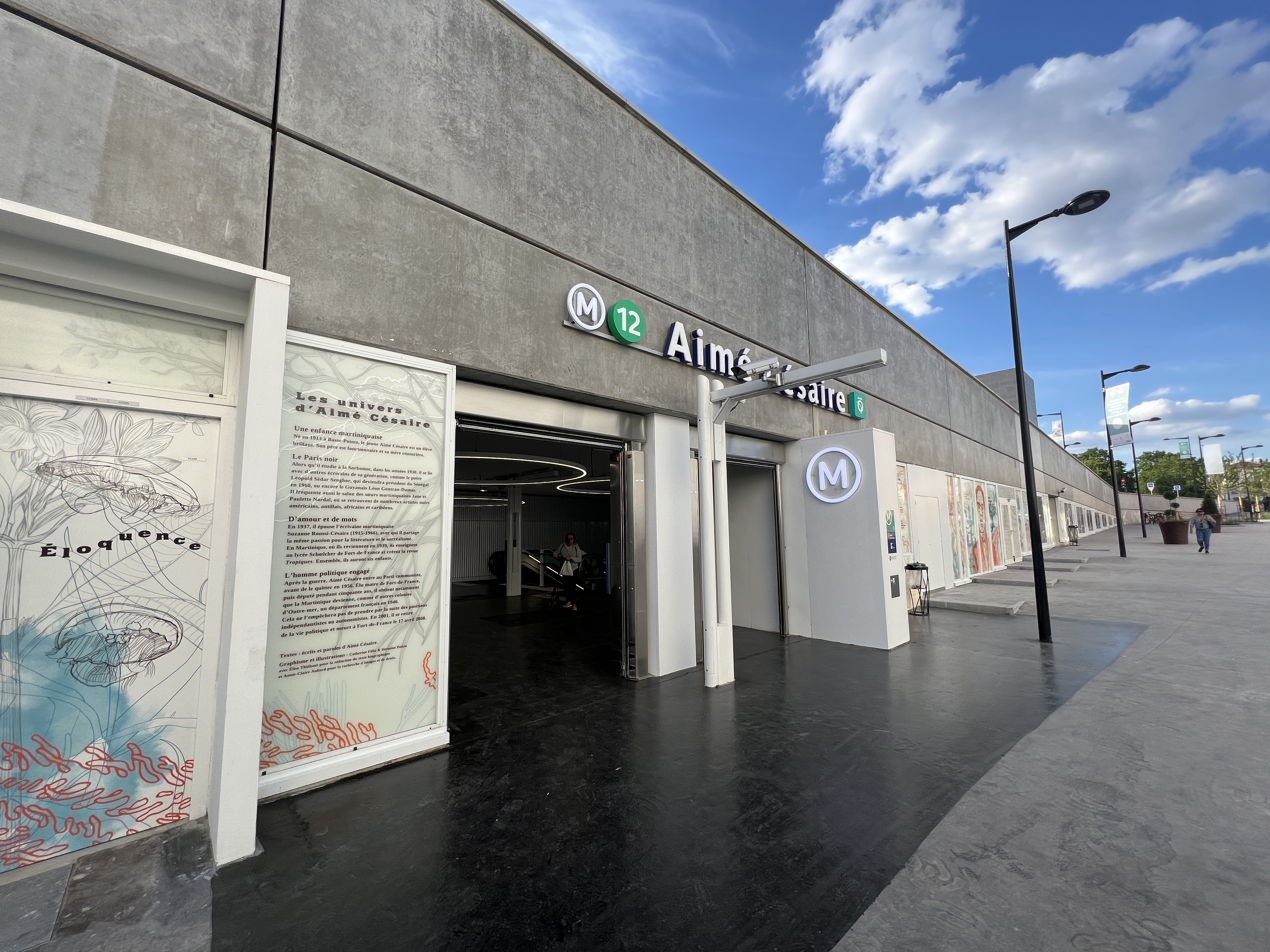
Frescoes along the façade

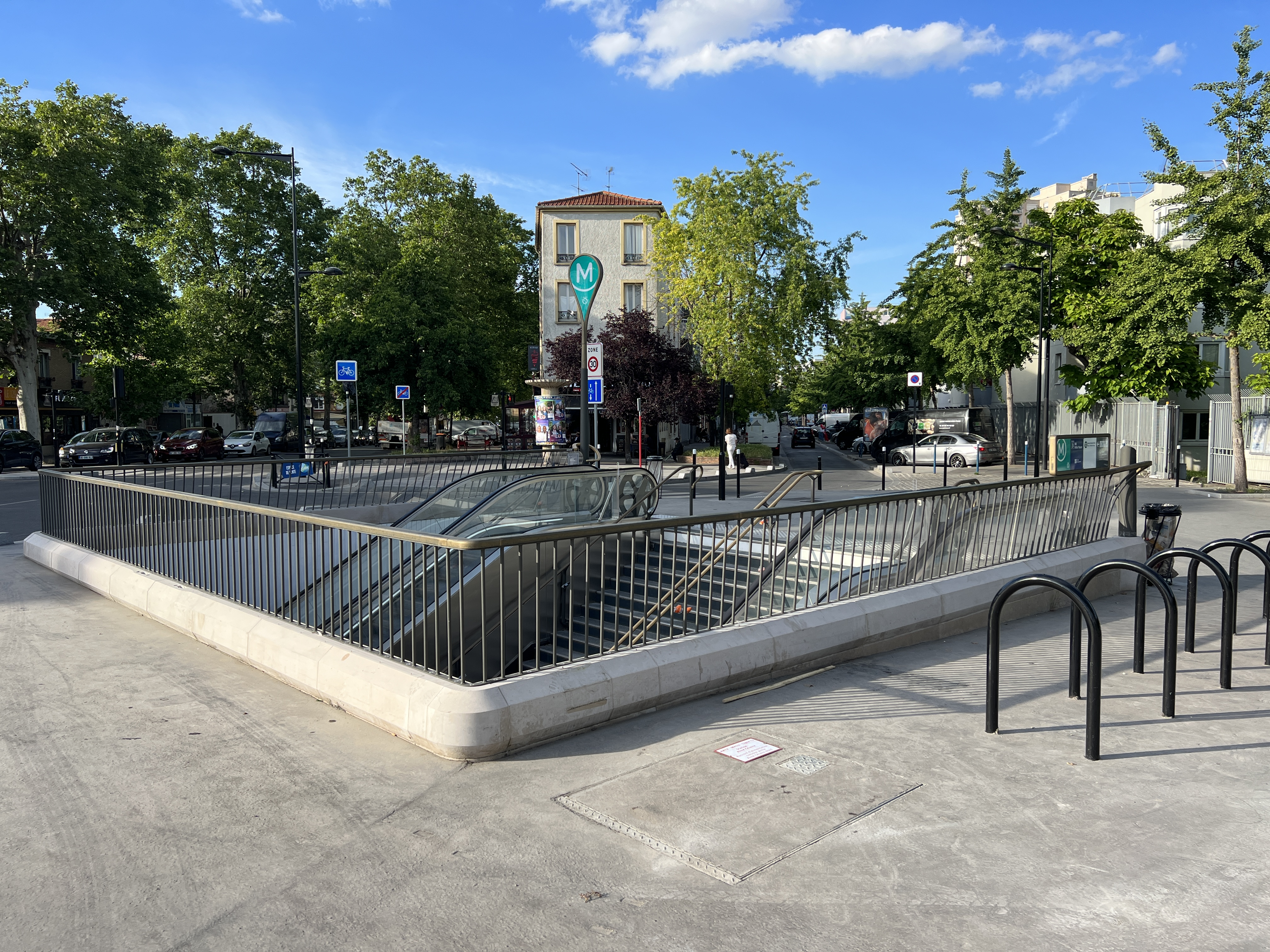
Access 3

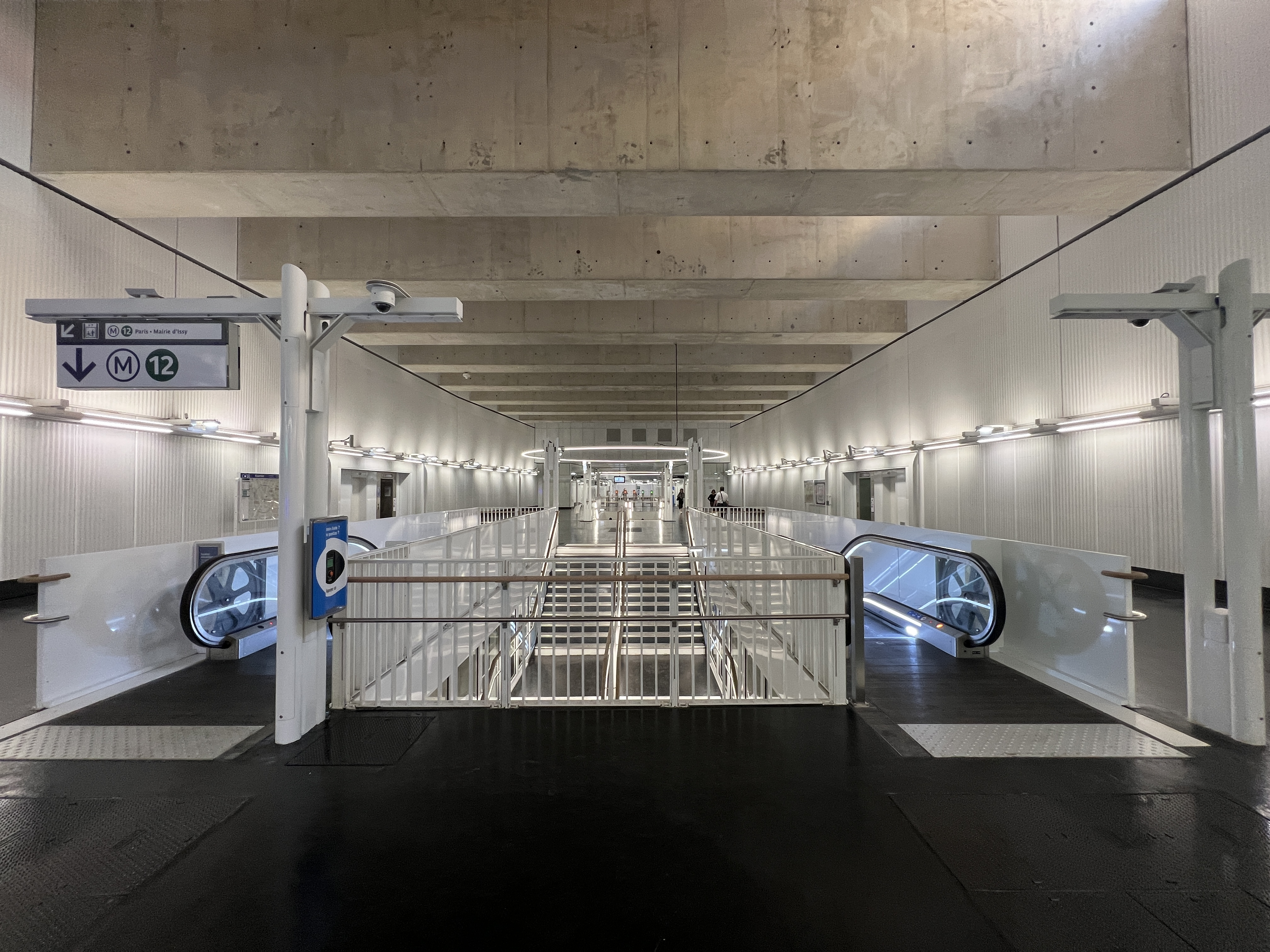
Mezzanine
