= Mairie d'Aubervilliers station =

Paris métro station

Mairie d'Aubervilliers Plaine des Vertus
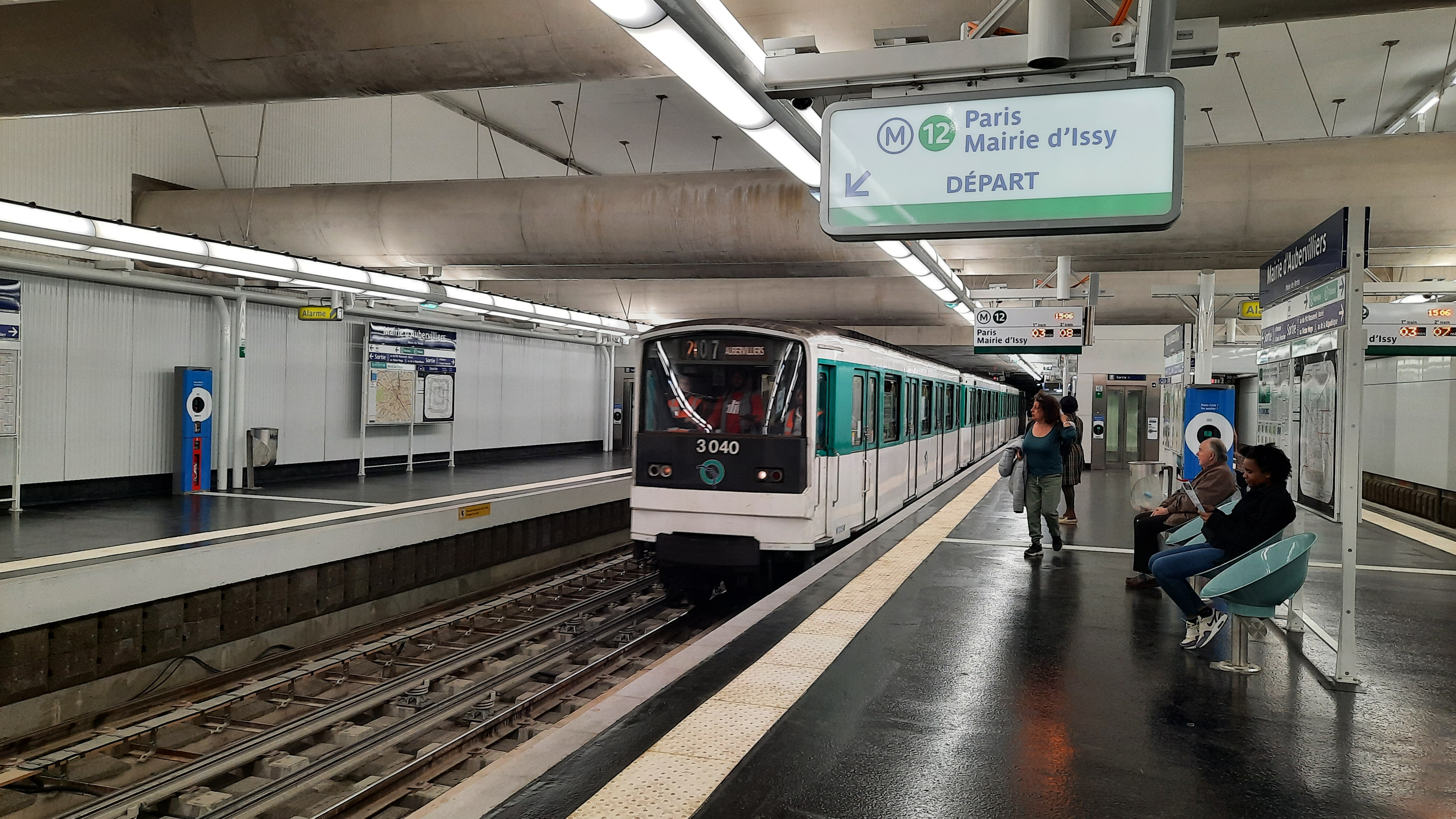
- MF 67 at Mairie d'Aubervilliers

General information
- Location: Aubervilliers, Seine-Saint-Denis; Île-de-France; France
- Coordinates: 48°54′50″N 2°22′50″E
- System: Paris Métro station
- Owner: RATP
- Operator: RATP
- Line: Paris Metro Paris Metro Line 12 Paris Metro Line 15
- Platforms: 2 (1 island platform, 1 side platform)
- Tracks: 3

Construction
- Depth: 26 m (85 ft) 34 m (Line 15)
- Accessible: yes

Other information
- Status: opened
- Station code: GA65 / 65MAU
- Fare zone: 2

History
- Opened: 31 May 2022

Services
Preceding station	Paris Metro	Following station
Aimé Césaire towards Mairie d'Issy	Line 12	Terminus
Location
- Location within Paris and inner ring

Mairie d'Aubervilliers (French pronunciation: [mɛʁi dobɛʁvilje]) is a station on Line 12 of the Paris Métro, and is the northern terminus of the line. The station is located near Aubervilliers town hall and opened on 31 May 2022. In the future, it will be served by Line 15 of the Grand Paris Express.

== History ==
=== Line 12 ===
Line 12 was extended north to Front Populaire in December 2012. As part of the construction of that extension, tunnelling had continued north beyond Front Populaire, allowing the Pont de Stains (later Aimé Césaire) and Mairie d'Aubervilliers stations to be constructed at a later date.

Construction on the station began in autumn 2014, with opening of the station planned for the end of 2017. However, technical difficulties due to sandy soil and a high water table led to substantial delays – with the opening of the station postponed to 2019 and then 2022.

The station opened as the 308th metro station on 31 May 2022, becoming the northern terminus of line 12. The station has the subtitle Plaine des Vertus.

=== Line 15 ===
In future, the station will be served by line 15 as part of the Grand Paris Express project. Approval for the eastern section of line 15 was given in 2020, with construction beginning in 2021. Major construction on the station itself will begin in 2024/25, with an opening date of 2030.

== Architecture and art ==
=== Line 12 ===
The station was designed by LIN (Finn Geipel and Giulia Andi). The design uses white corrugated metal panels on the walls, and large circular light fittings – a similar concept was also used at Barbara and Bagneux–Lucie Aubrac stations on Line 4. The station's external accesses and surroundings were designed by Marc Aurel, with fine curves made of brass.

=== Line 15 ===
Initial plans were that the station would be designed by Grimshaw Architects.

== Passenger services ==
As with all new metro stations since 1992, the station is fully accessible.

=== Access ===
The station has 5 accesses:

- Access 1: Avenue du Pdt Roosevelt
- Access 2: Avenue Victor Hugo
- Access 3: Rue Pasteur (accessible with an elevator)
- Access 4: Rue Fourrier
- Access 5: Avenue de la République (accessible with an elevator)

=== Connections ===
The station is also served by lines 35, 150, 170, and 173 of the RATP bus network.

== Gallery ==
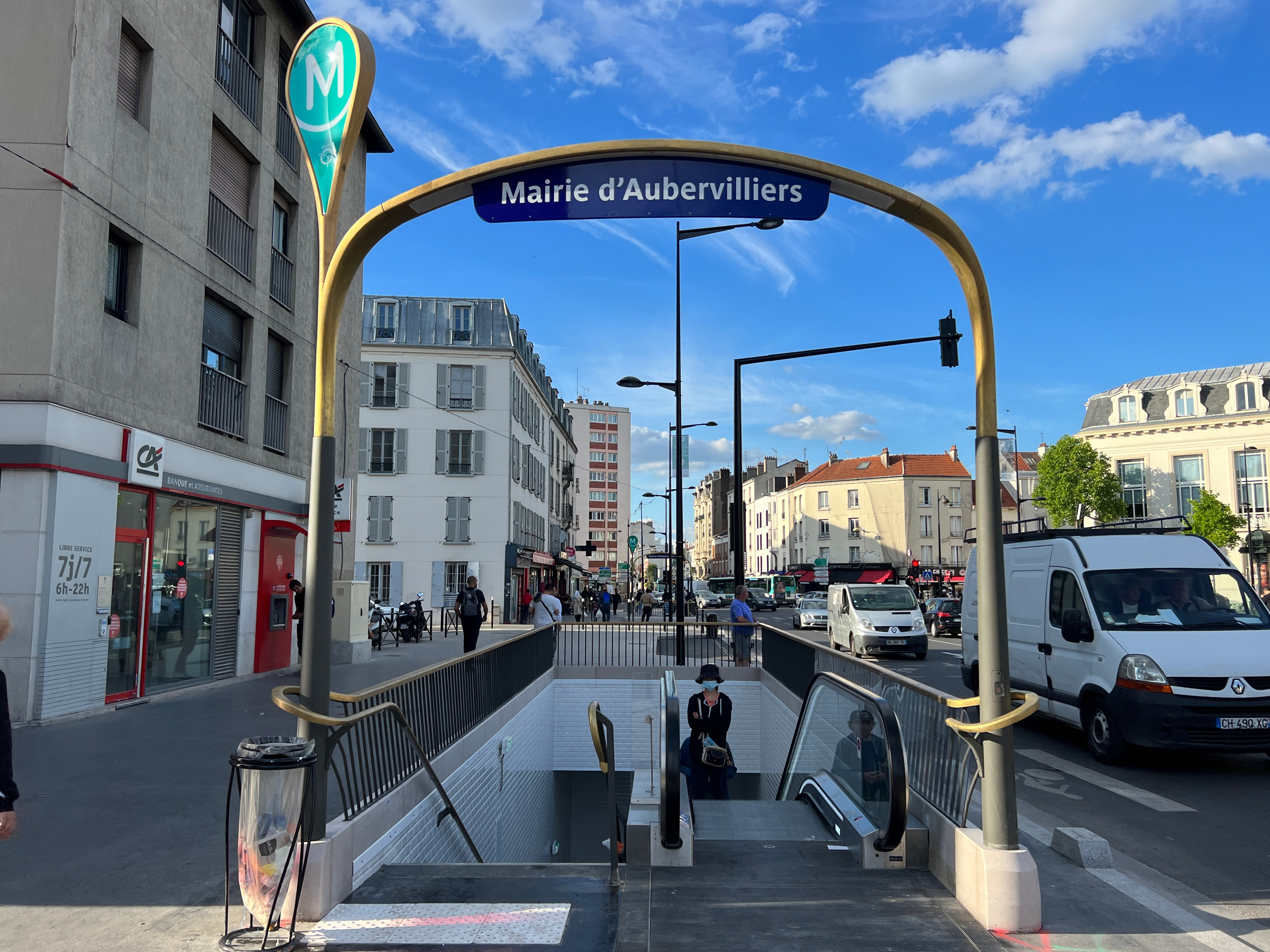
Entrance along avenue Victor Hugo

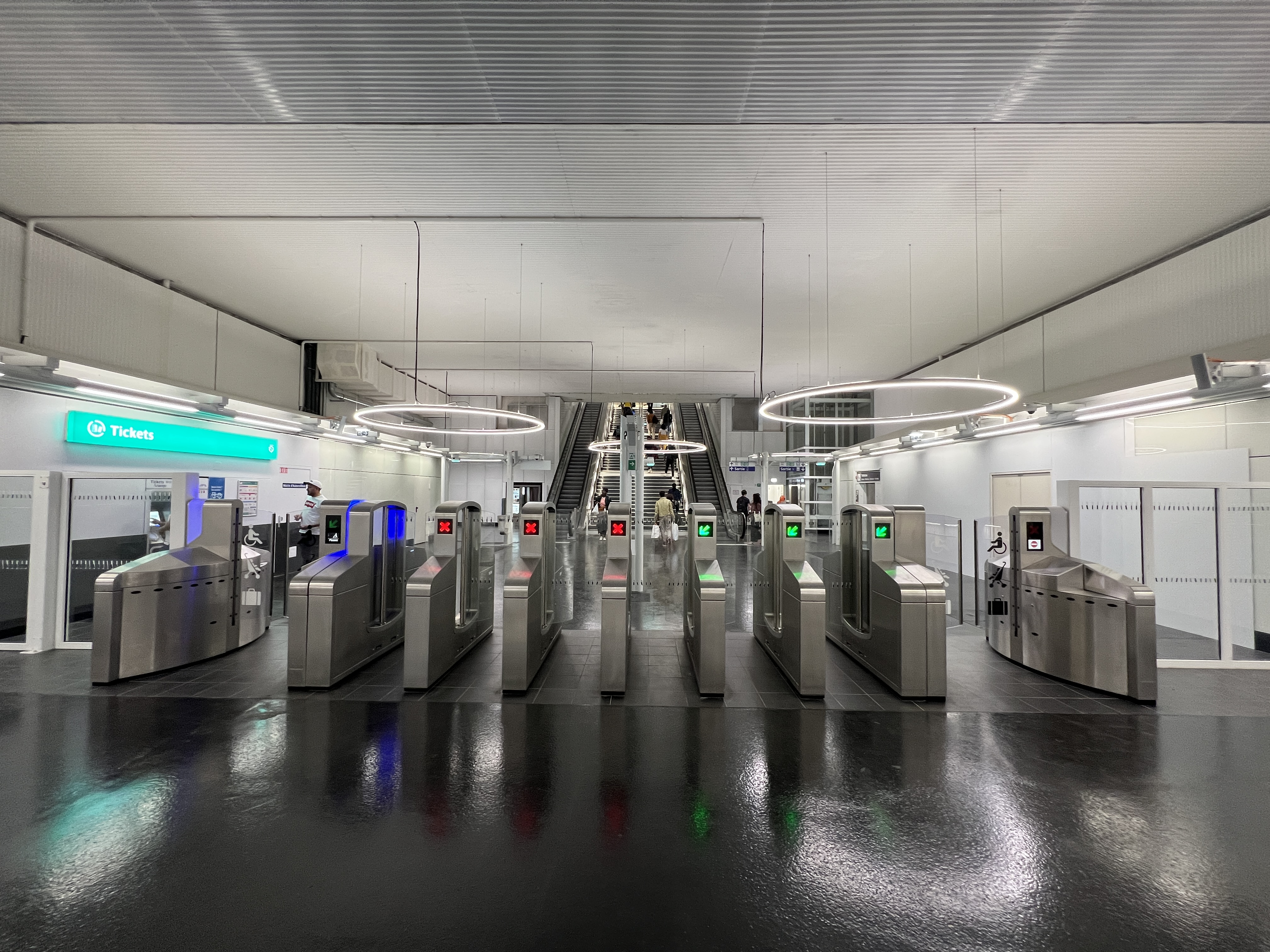
Concourse

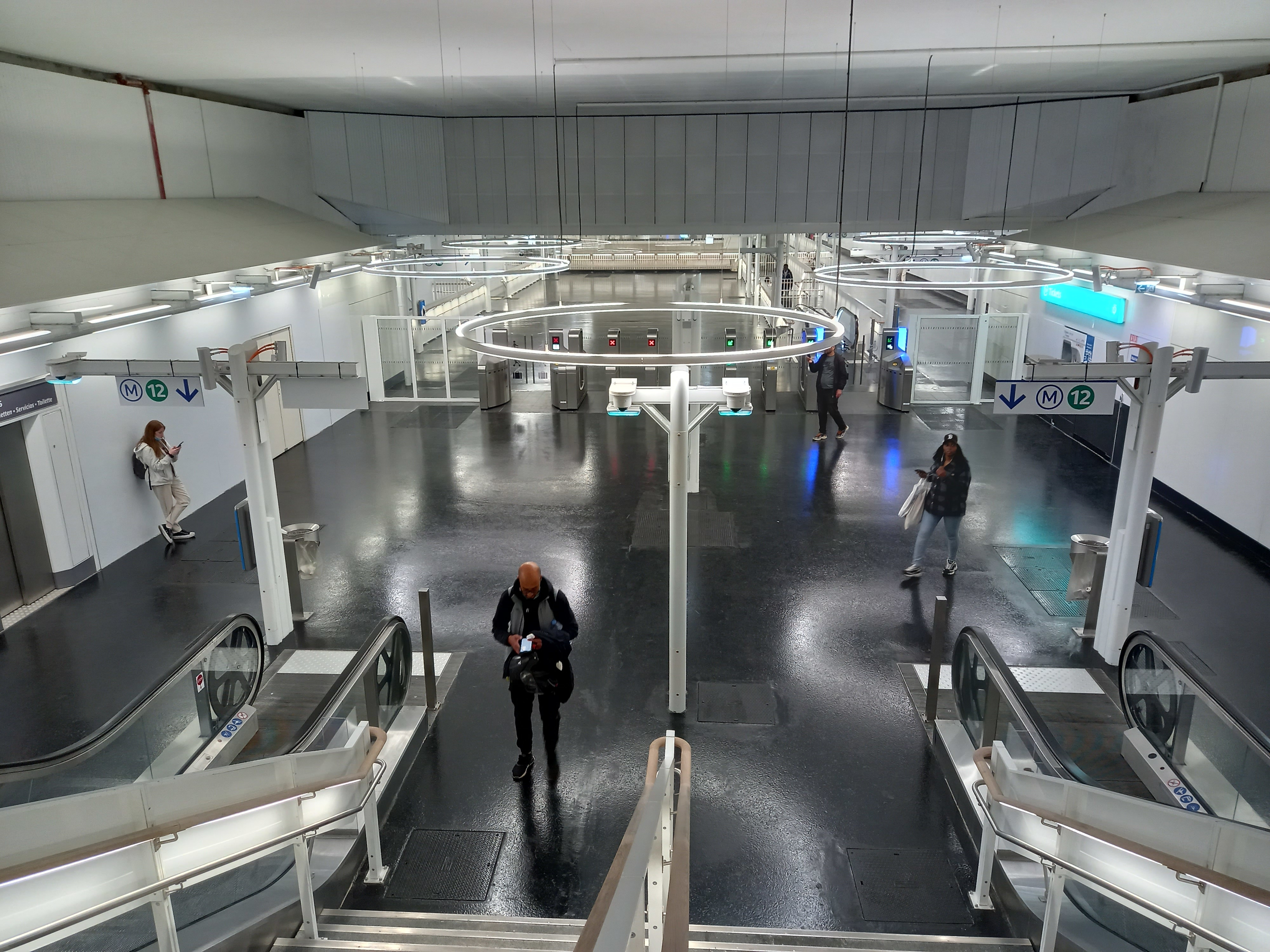
