= Saint-Bernard de la Chapelle =

Neo-gothic Roman Catholic church in Goutte d'Or, France

Saint-Bernard-de-La-Chapelle
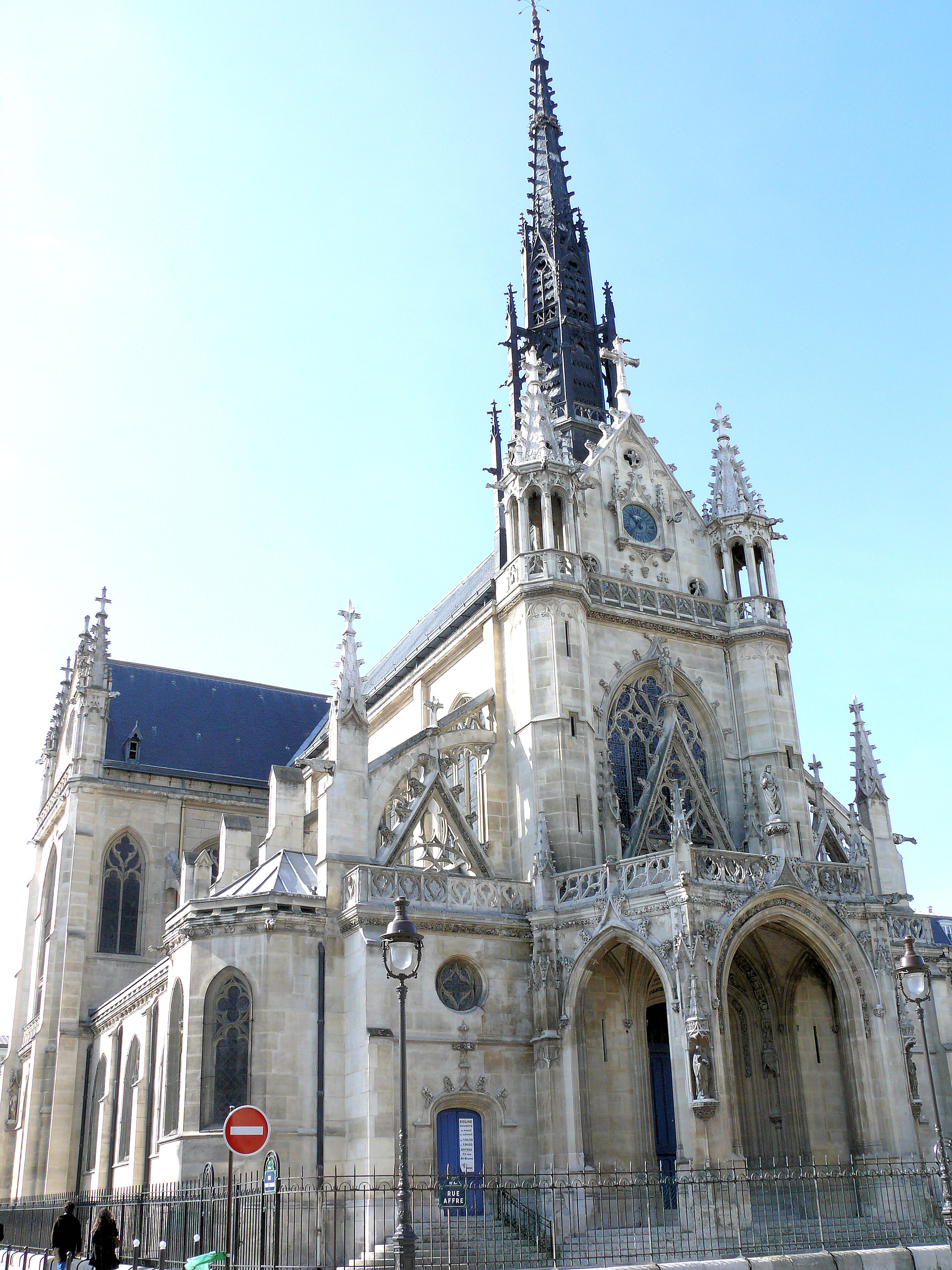
- Saint-Bernard-de-La-Chapelle
- 48°53′10″N 2°21′18″E
- Location: 18th arrondissement of Paris
- Country: France
- Denomination: Roman Catholic

Architecture
- Groundbreaking: 1858
- Completed: 1861

Saint-Bernard-de-La-Chapelle (French pronunciation: [sɛ̃.bɛʁ.naʁ.də.la.ʃa.pɛl]), is a Neo-Gothic Roman Catholic parish church located at 11 rue Affre in the 18th arrondissement of Paris in the quarter known as he Goutte d'Or It takes its name from Bernard de Clairvaux, a monk from Burgundy in the 12th century who reformed the Cistercian Order. "La Chapelle" was the name of the neighbourhood, and came from a legendary chapel that was believed to have been built there by in 475 by Saint Genevieve over the burial place of Saint Denis, decapitated there in about 250 A.D.

The architect of the new church was Joseph Magne, one of the principal city architects under Napoleon III and his chief city planner Baron Haussmann. Construction of the church started in 1858 and was completed in 1861. The church is considered one of the finest of the Neo-Gothic churches built in Paris in the 19th century.

== History ==
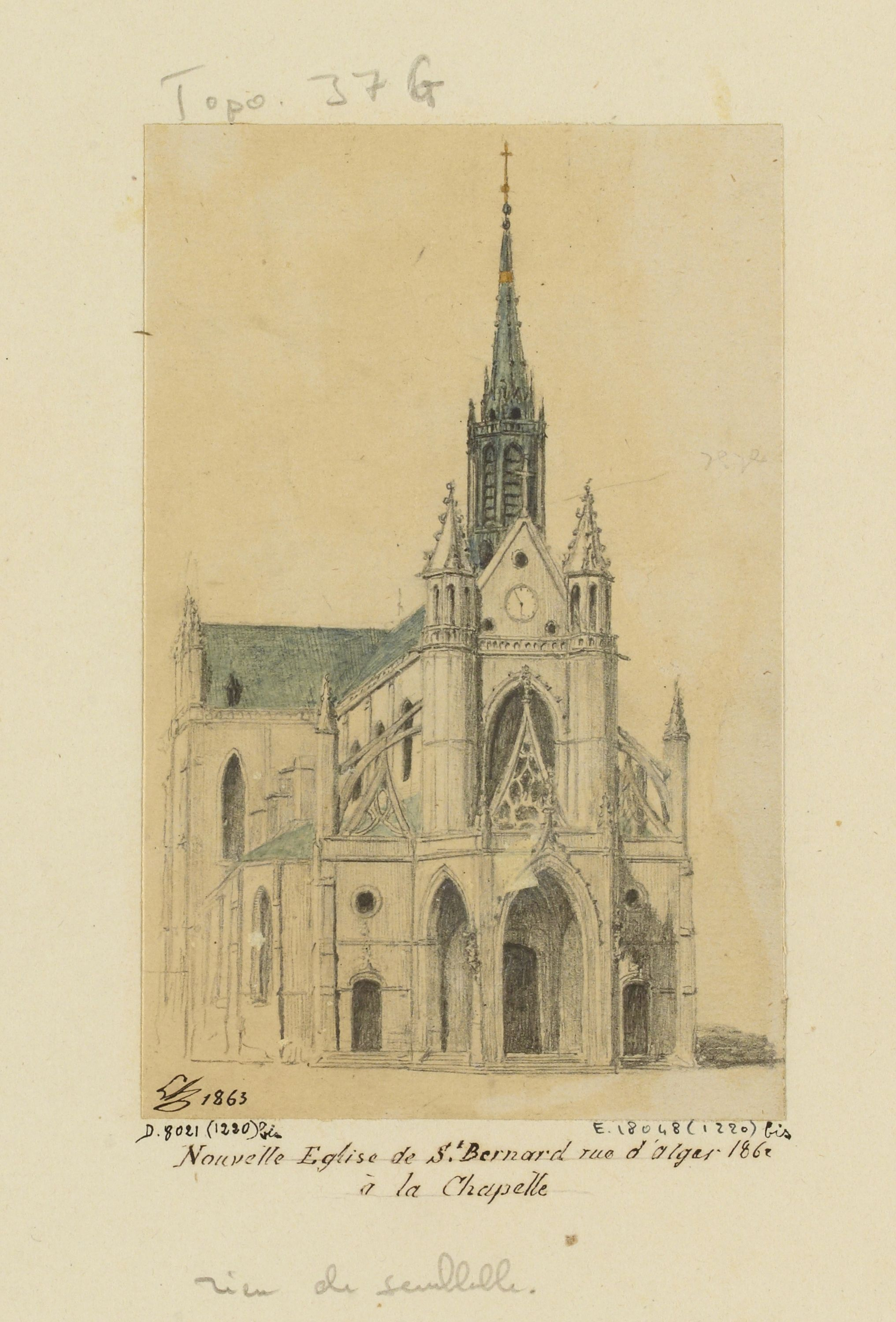
The church in 1863

Until 1860, the Goutte d'Or formed part of the commune of La Chapelle, and was thus served by the historic village Church of Saint-Denys de la Chapelle, where Joan of Arc paused when entering Paris in 1429. The construction and development of the Gare du Nord, immediately to the south of the Goutte d'Or, and the installation of new factories, led to a significant increase in the neighbourhood's population and the need for a larger church.

The architect of the new church was Auguste-Josephe Magne (1816-1885), under the direction of Baron Haussmann. the Prefect of the Seine, who supervised the major building projects launched by Napoleon III. The construction began in 1858 and was completed in 1861, shortly before the Goutte d'Or neighbourhood became part of the new 18th arrondissement of Paris.

The parish is considered one of the most ethnically diverse in Paris, with residents from seventy recorded nationalities. In the late 20th century, large numbers of immigrants, particularly from the former French colonies in North Africa, arrived in Paris, causing tensions. On 28 June 1996, a group of around 300 immigrants and their supporters occupied Saint-Bernard-de-la-Chapelle, attracting a significant amount of media attention. After nearly a month of occupation, on 23 August 1996 the police stormed the building and arrested the occupiers.

== Exterior ==
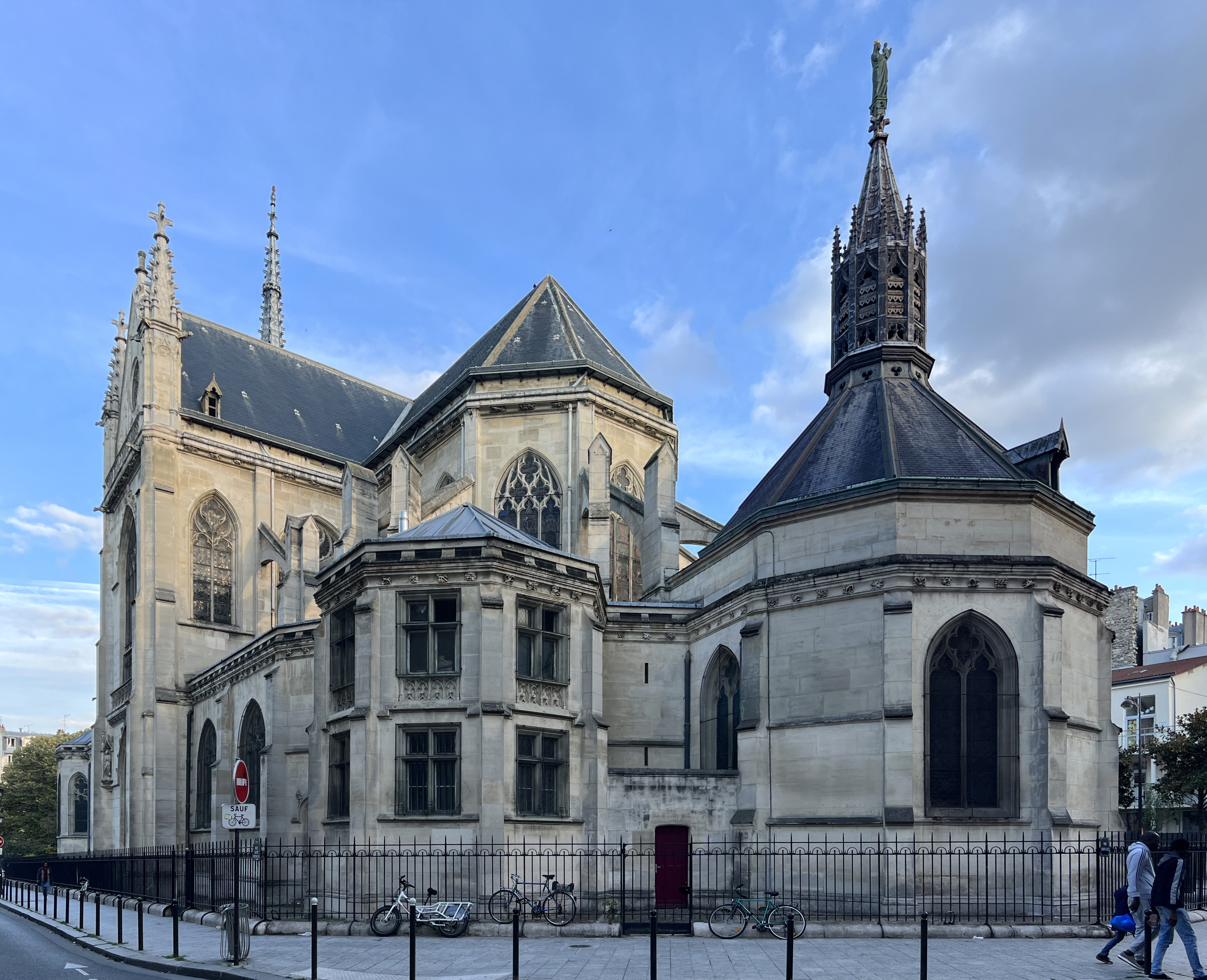
The apse chapel

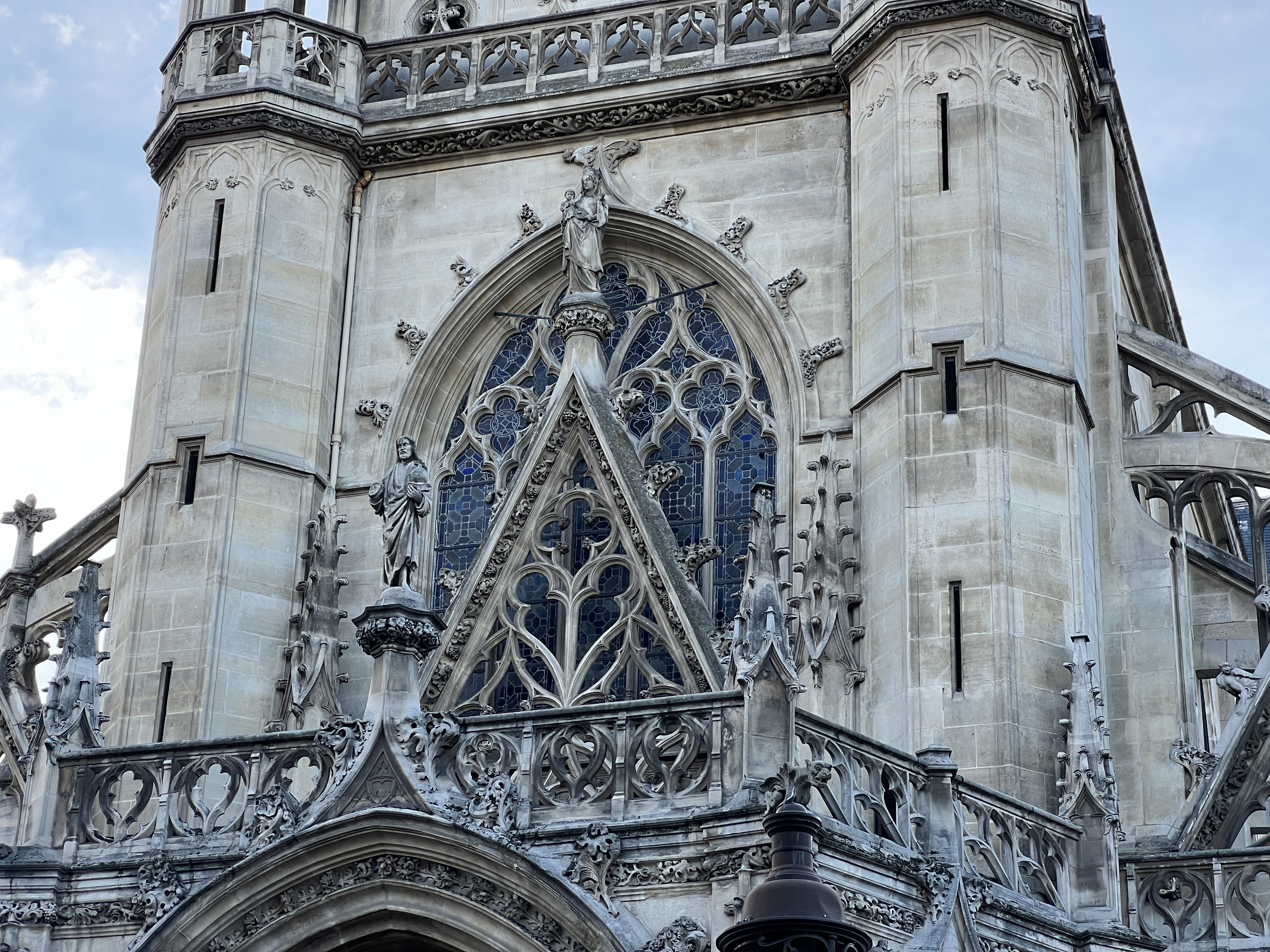
The upper facade arch, with Virgin and Child at the top

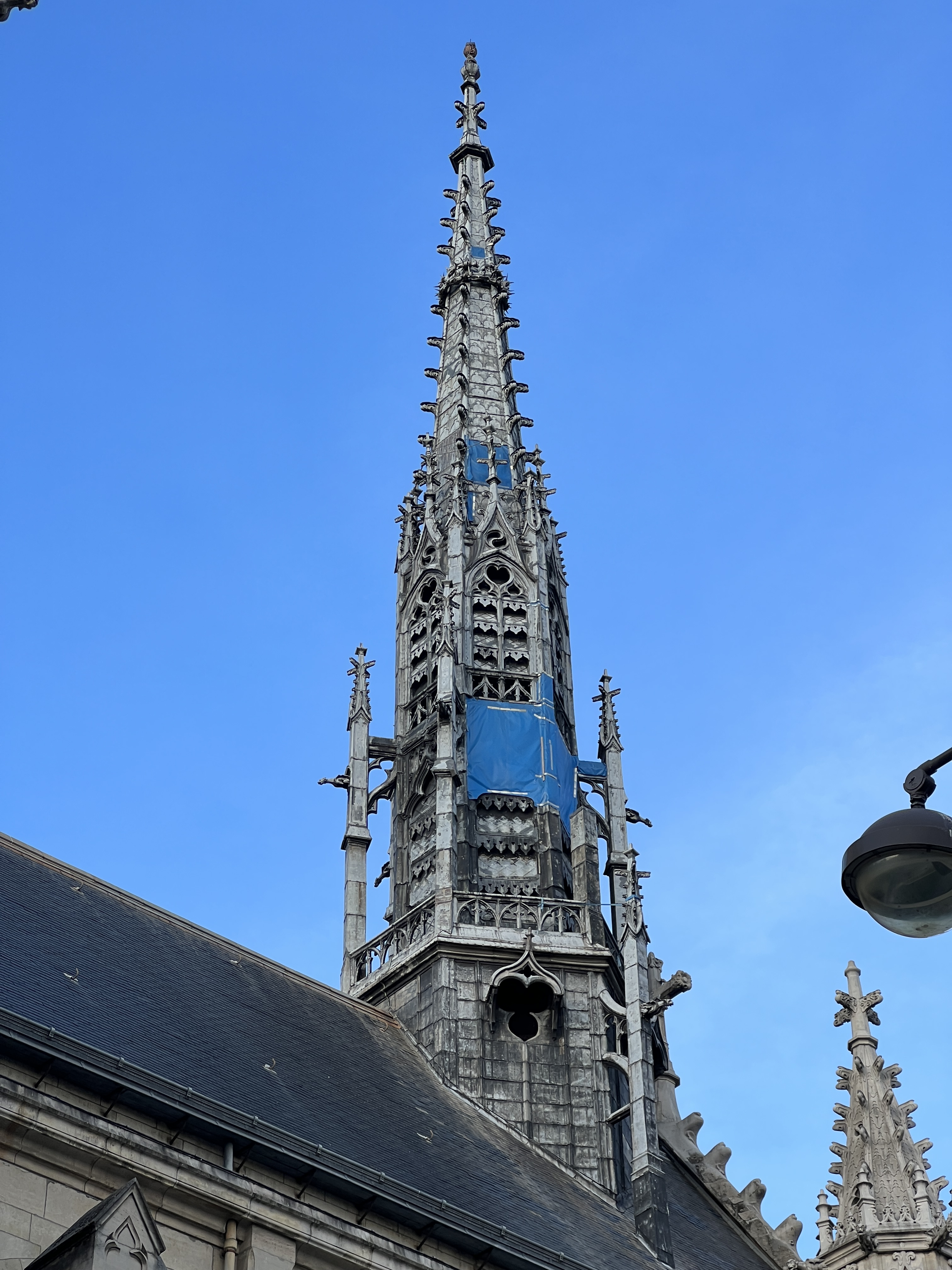
The spire

Due to the new street plan of the neighbourhood caused by the Haussmann modifications, the facade of the church faces to the west, rather than the east, with the sun rising behind the apse, rather than facing the facade.

The decor of the facade is devoted to the resurrection of Christ. On the pillars, one sculpted angel holds the Crown of Thorns, while another holds a cross and a book. At the peak of the central arch of the porch is a statue of Christ, visible from far away. Behind him, a Virgin and Child welcome the faithful. The tympanums to the sides of the central arch, have sculpture with similar themes; the south tympanum depicts the crowning of the Virgin, while the north depicts the Resurrection.

== Interior ==
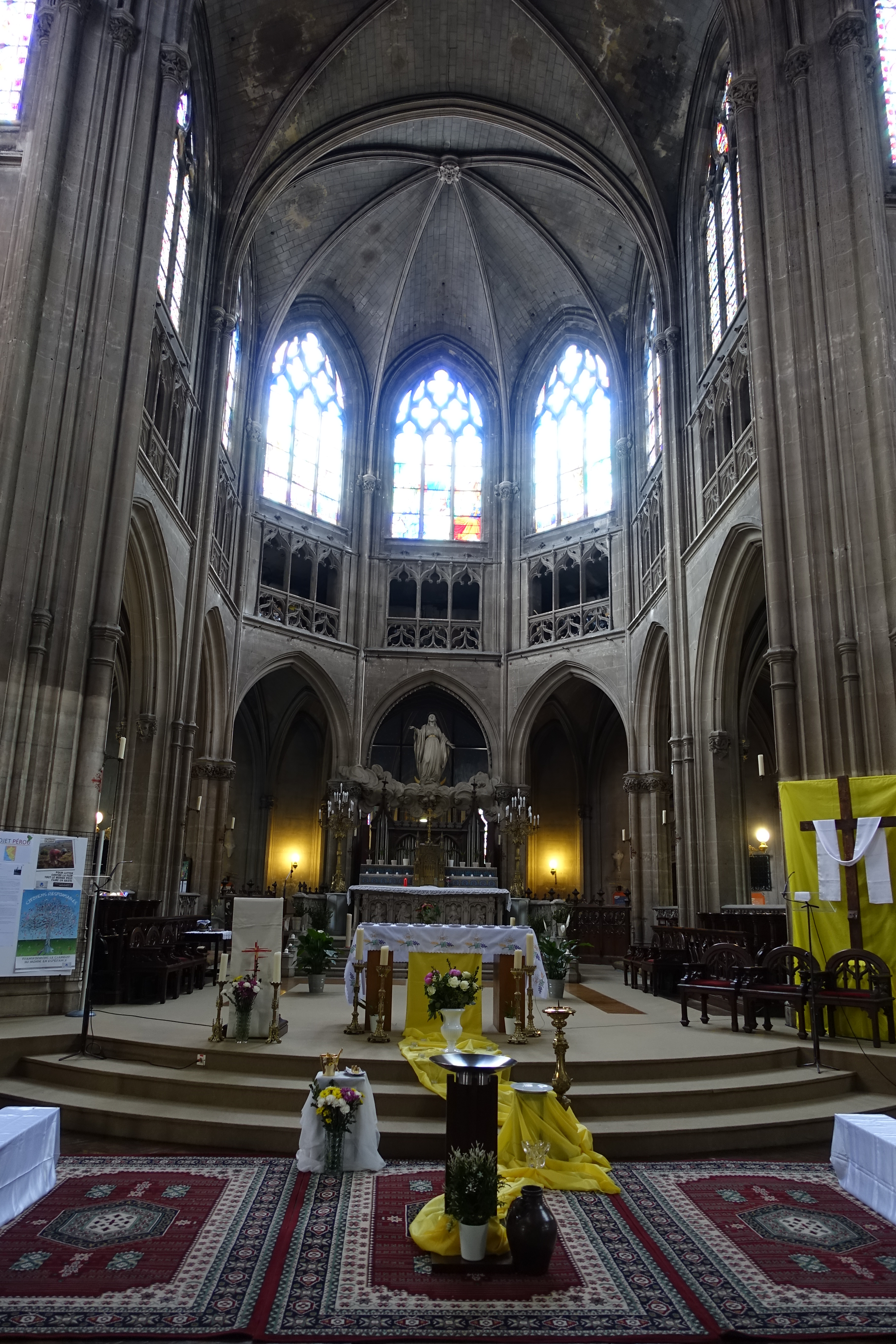
The Choir

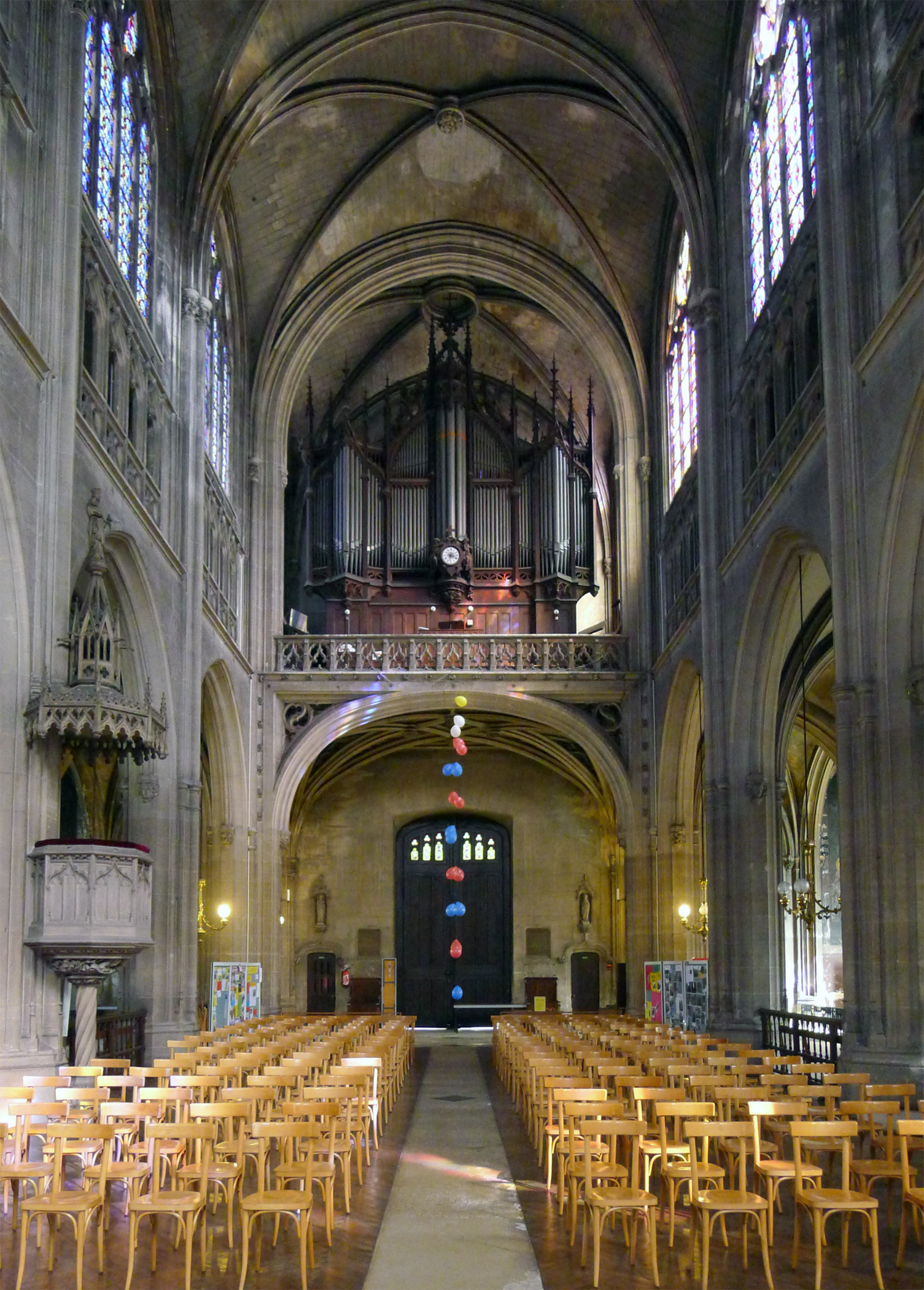
The nave and the tribune

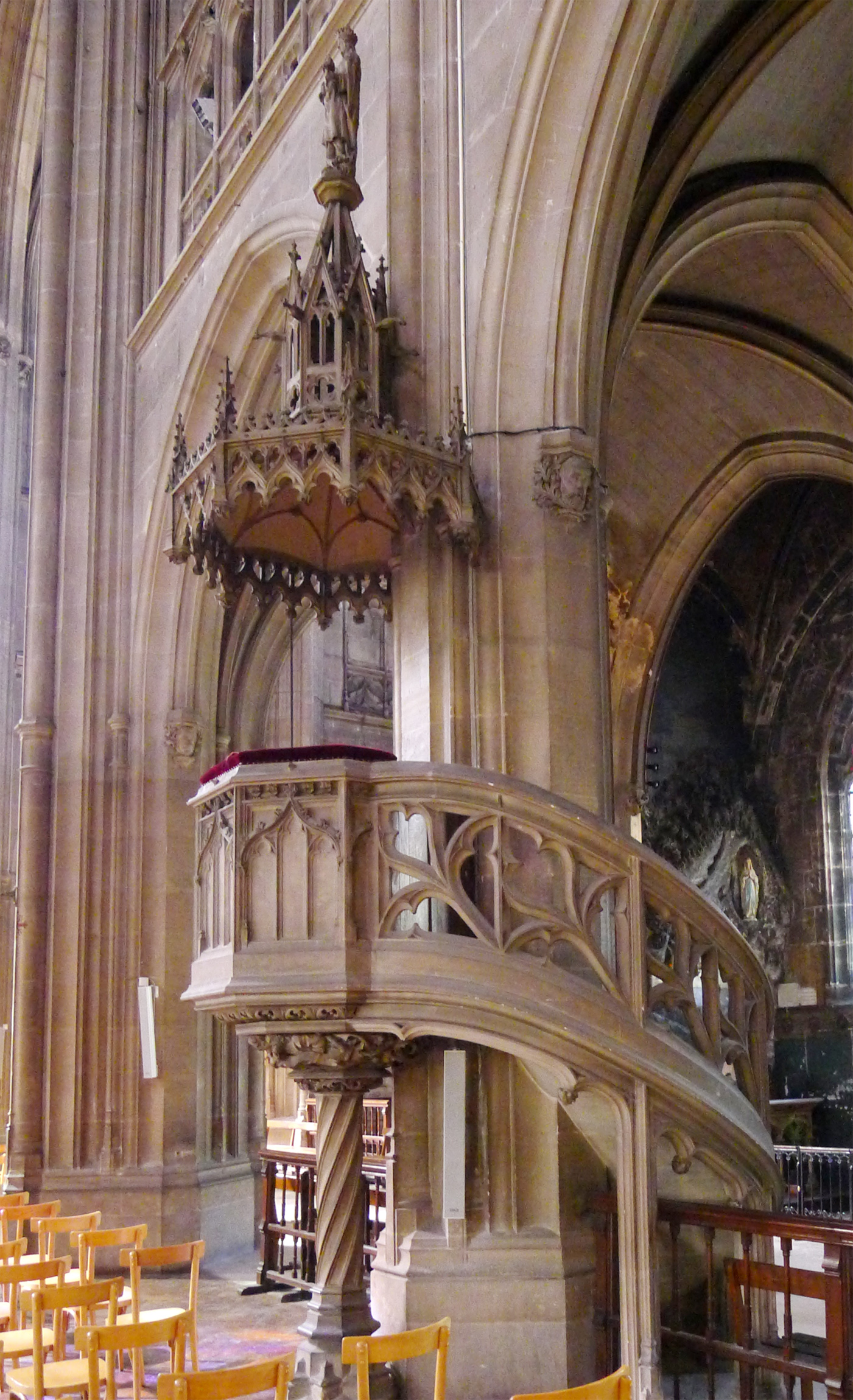
The pulpit

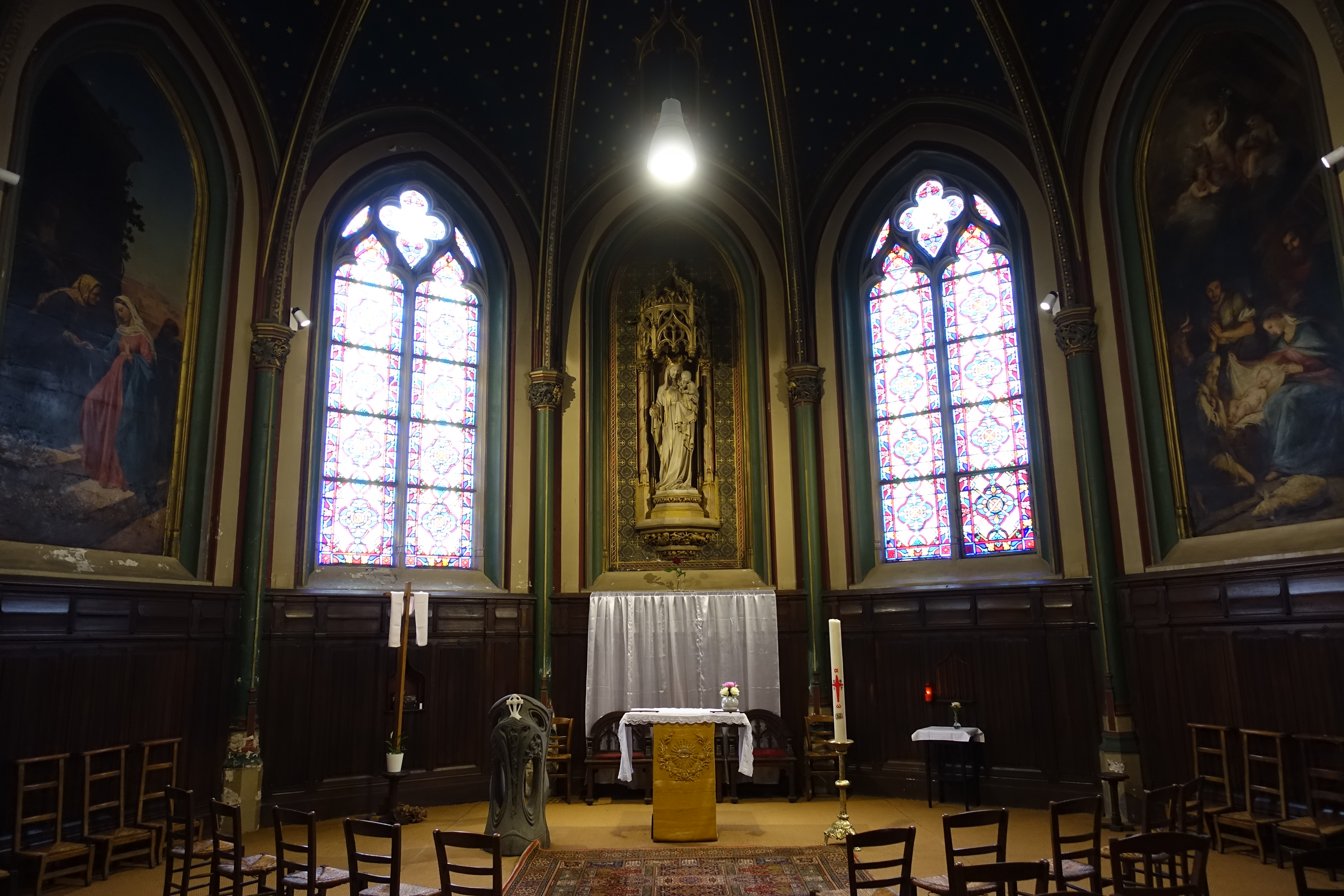
Chapel of the Virgin

While the exterior decoration looks agitated, the interior expresses harmony and calm. The disambulatory aisles around the nave, transept and choir form a large cross. At the end of the choir a statue of the Virgin Mary is the dominant element. Crowned with stars, in front of a crossing of the moon and a white sky, she represents the Immaculate Conception, a church doctrine which had been formerly promulgated by the Vatican in 1854.

The main altar features a tabernacle made of gilded bronze depicting the portal of a church in the Gothic style.

The Baptistry is located in the first chapel on the south side aisle. The font of the baptistry features enamels in turquoise and azur, and a covering of copper.

The transepts at the meeting of the nave and the choir are decorated with special furnishings; retables made of stone with altars dedicated to Saint Bernard (to the north) and Saint Genevieve, the defender of Paris, to the south.

The Chapel of the Virgin, located behind the choir, is decorated with four painted panels, illustrating the four major events of her life; the Annunciation by the Angel Gabriel; the Visitation, the Adoration of the Shepherds at the birth of Christ, and the Assumption of Christ into heaven.

== Art and Decoration ==
=== Stained Glass ===
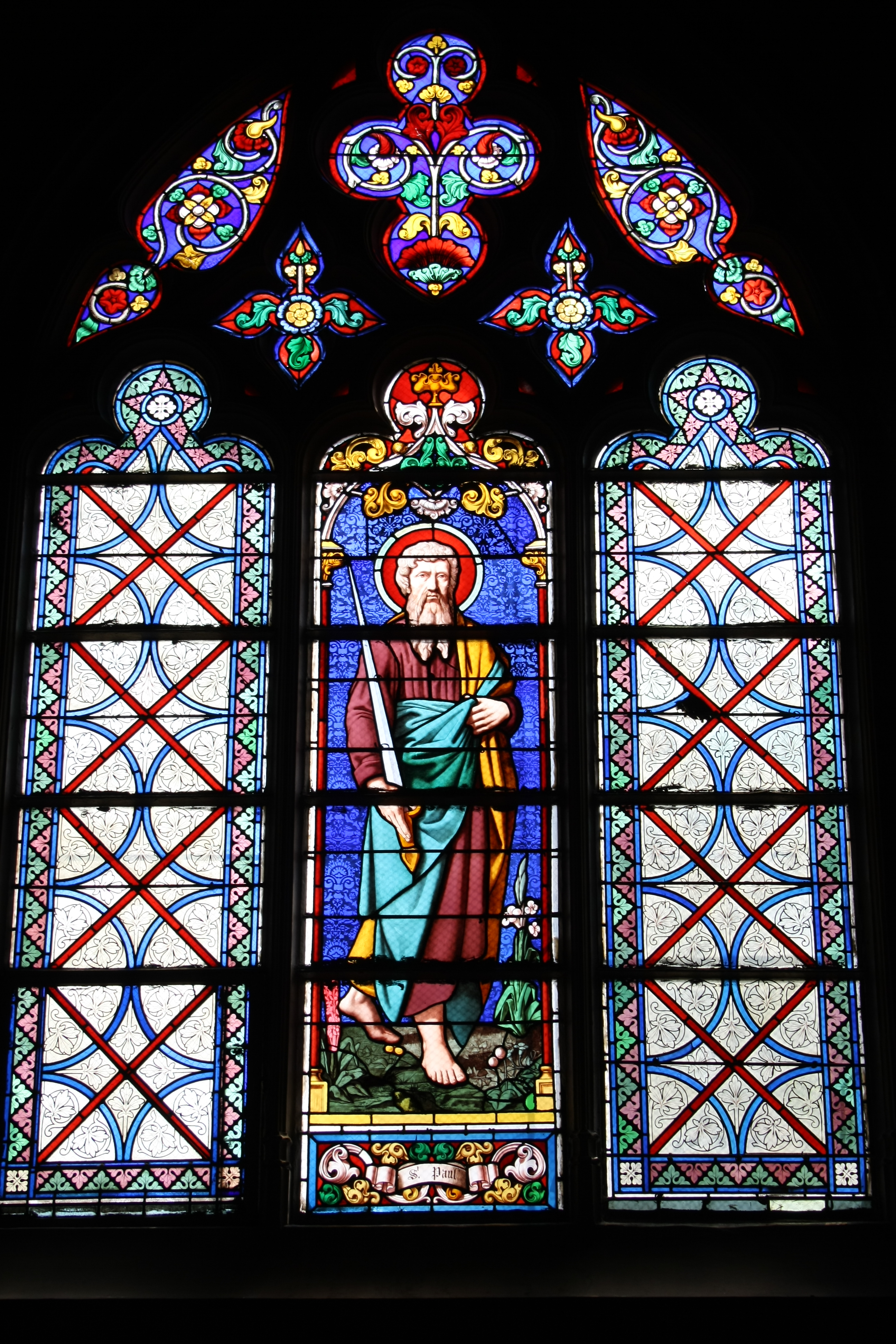
The Apostle Paul

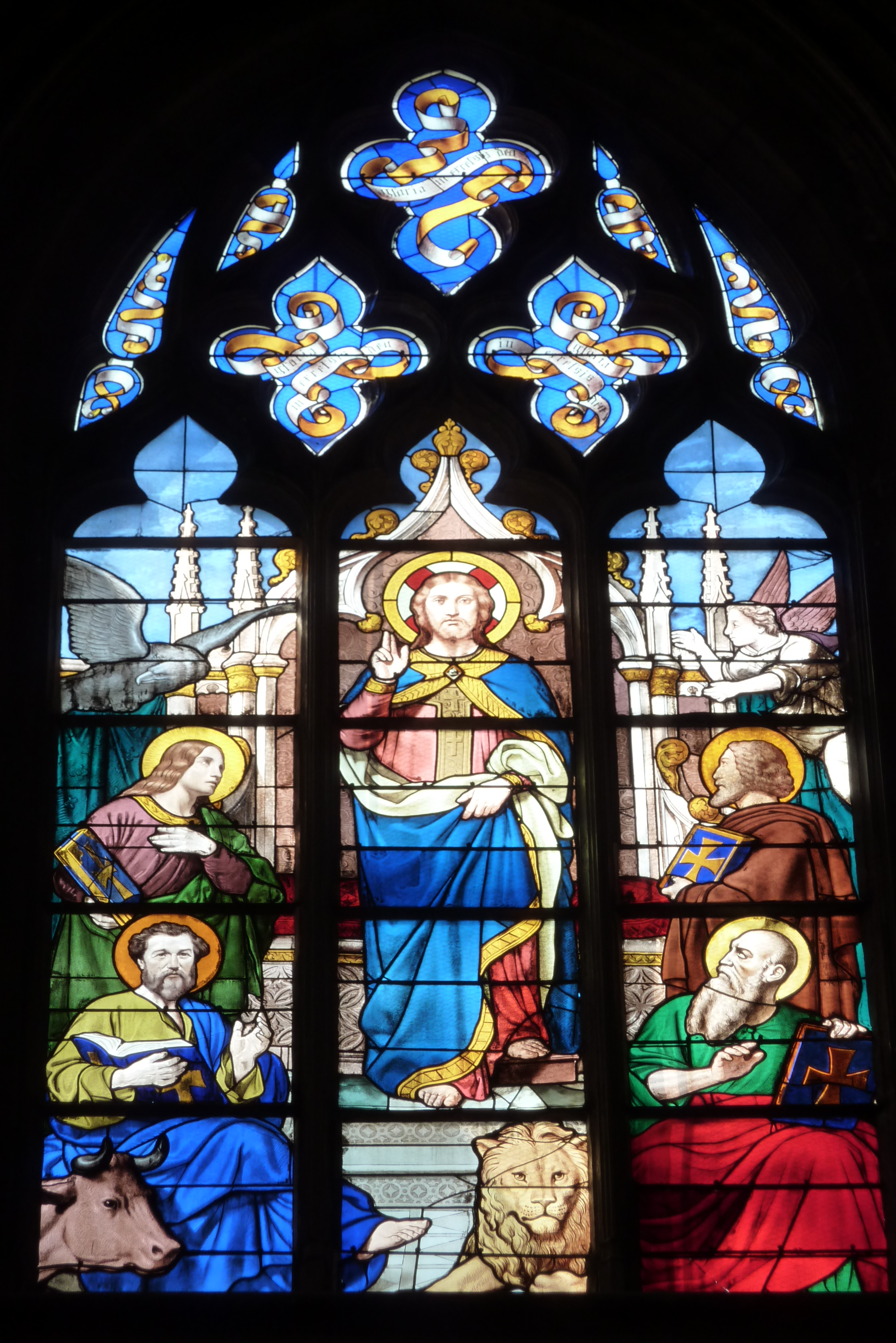
Christ and the Apostles (Center Choir window)

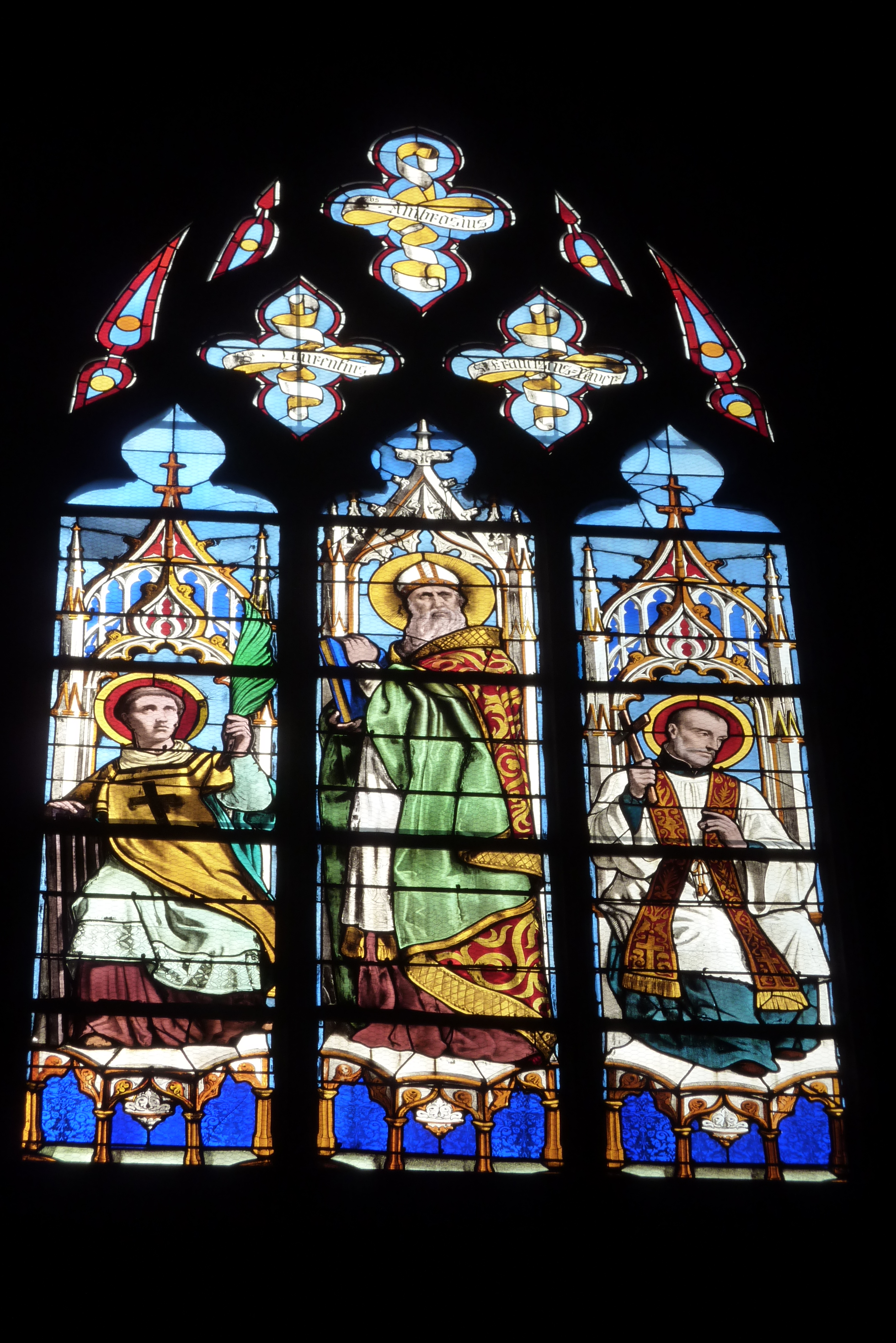
Saints Lawrence, Ambrose and Ignatius de Loyola

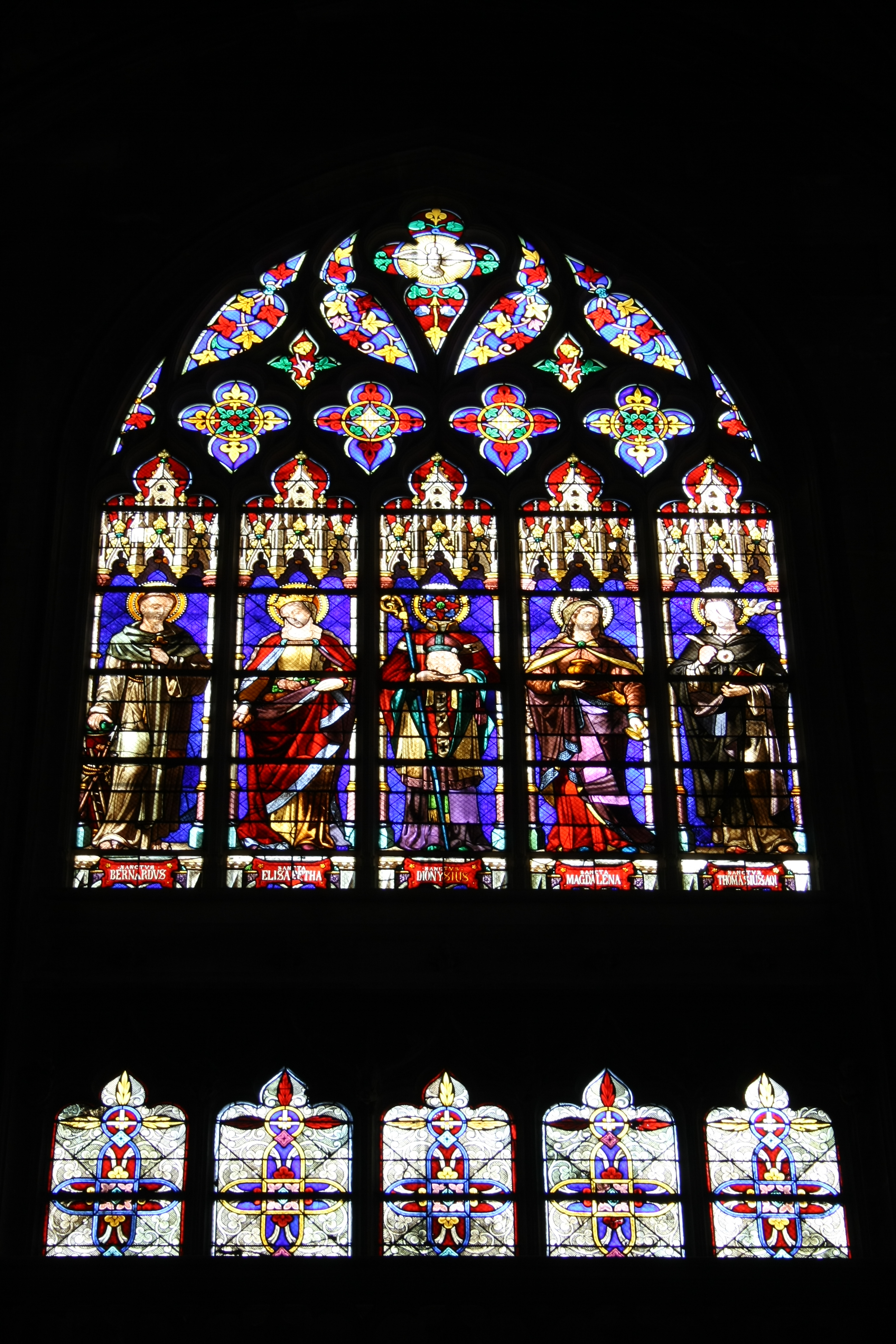
Saint Bernhard, Elisabeth, Dionysius and Thomas Aquinus

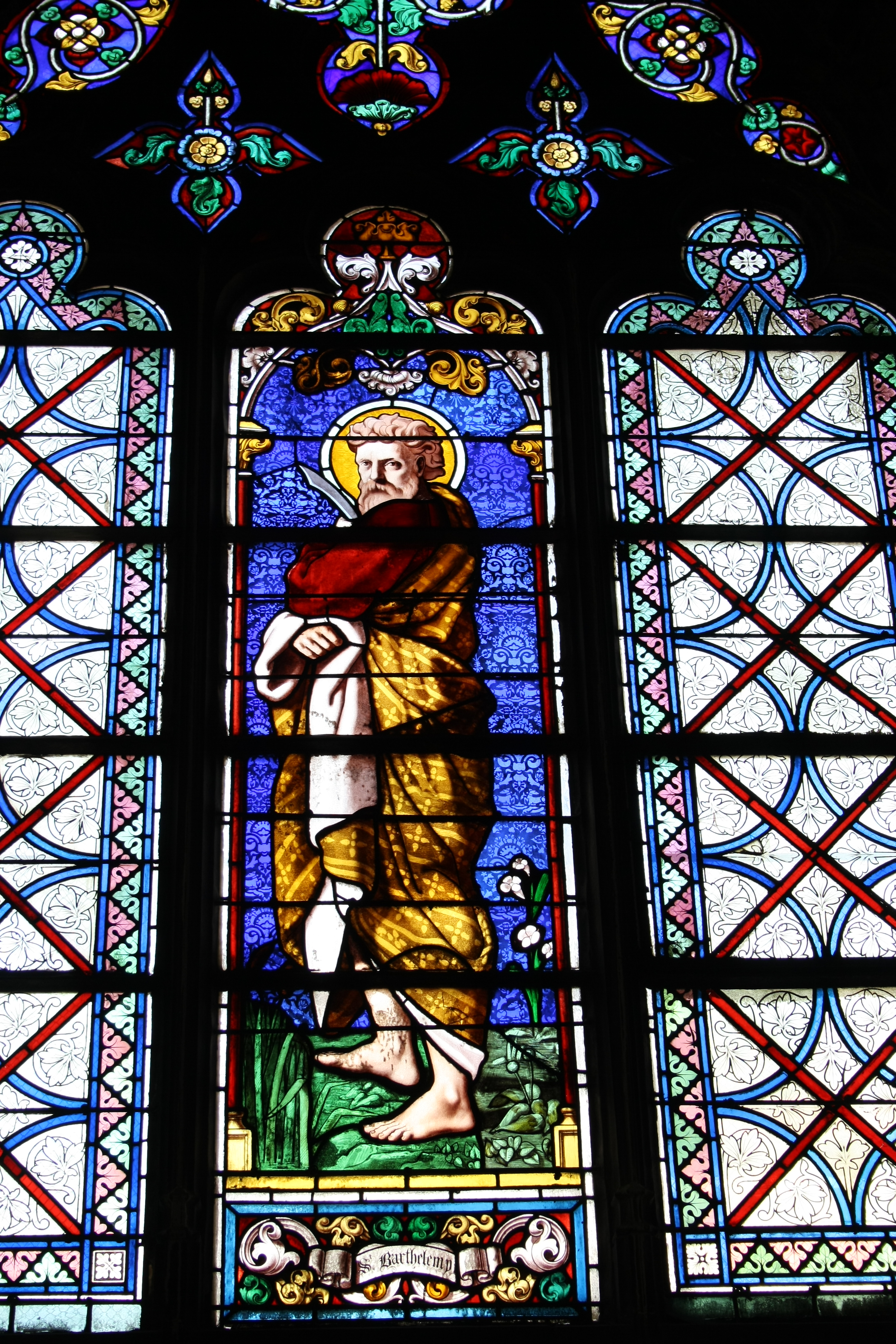
The Apostle Bartholomew

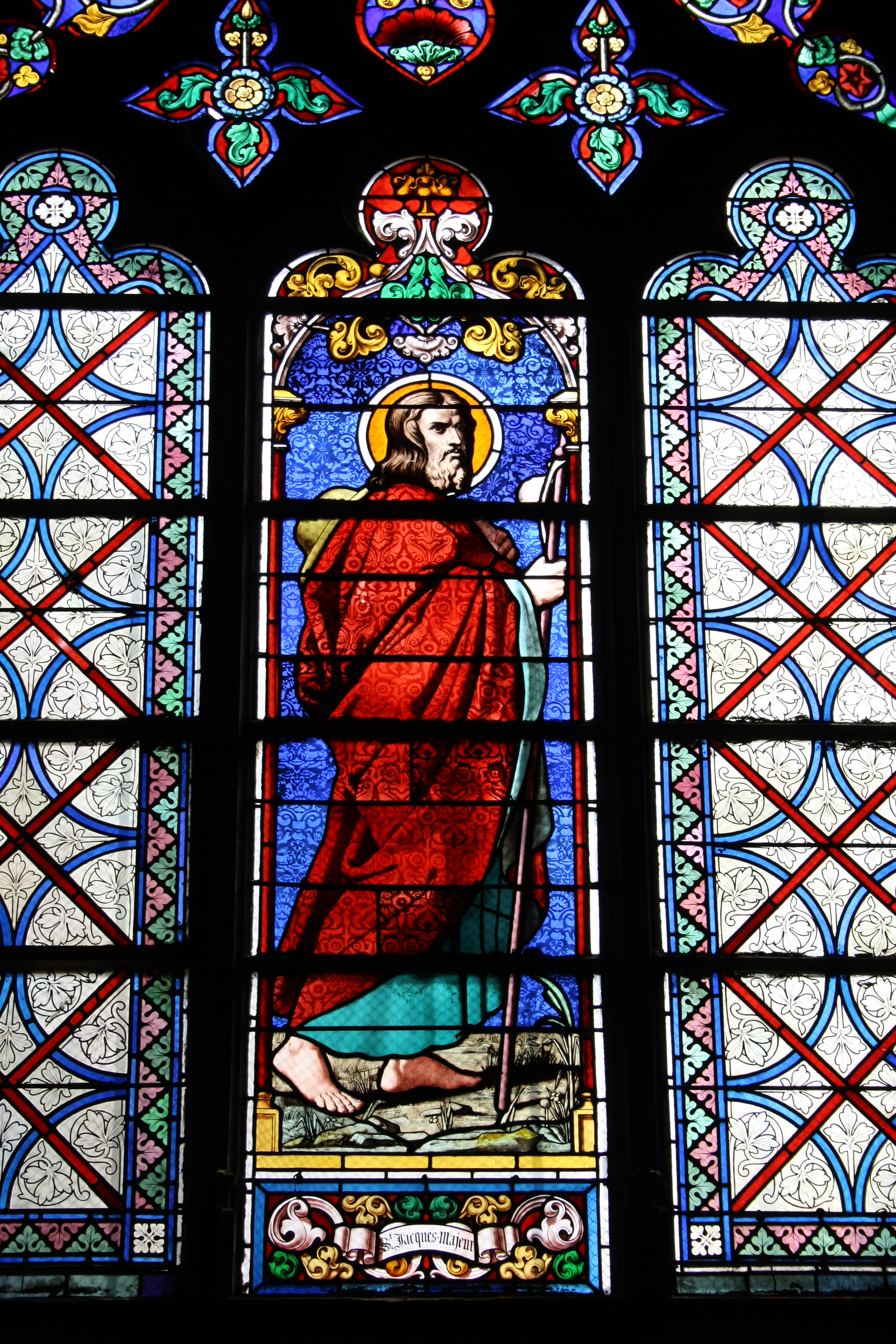
Saint John the Elder

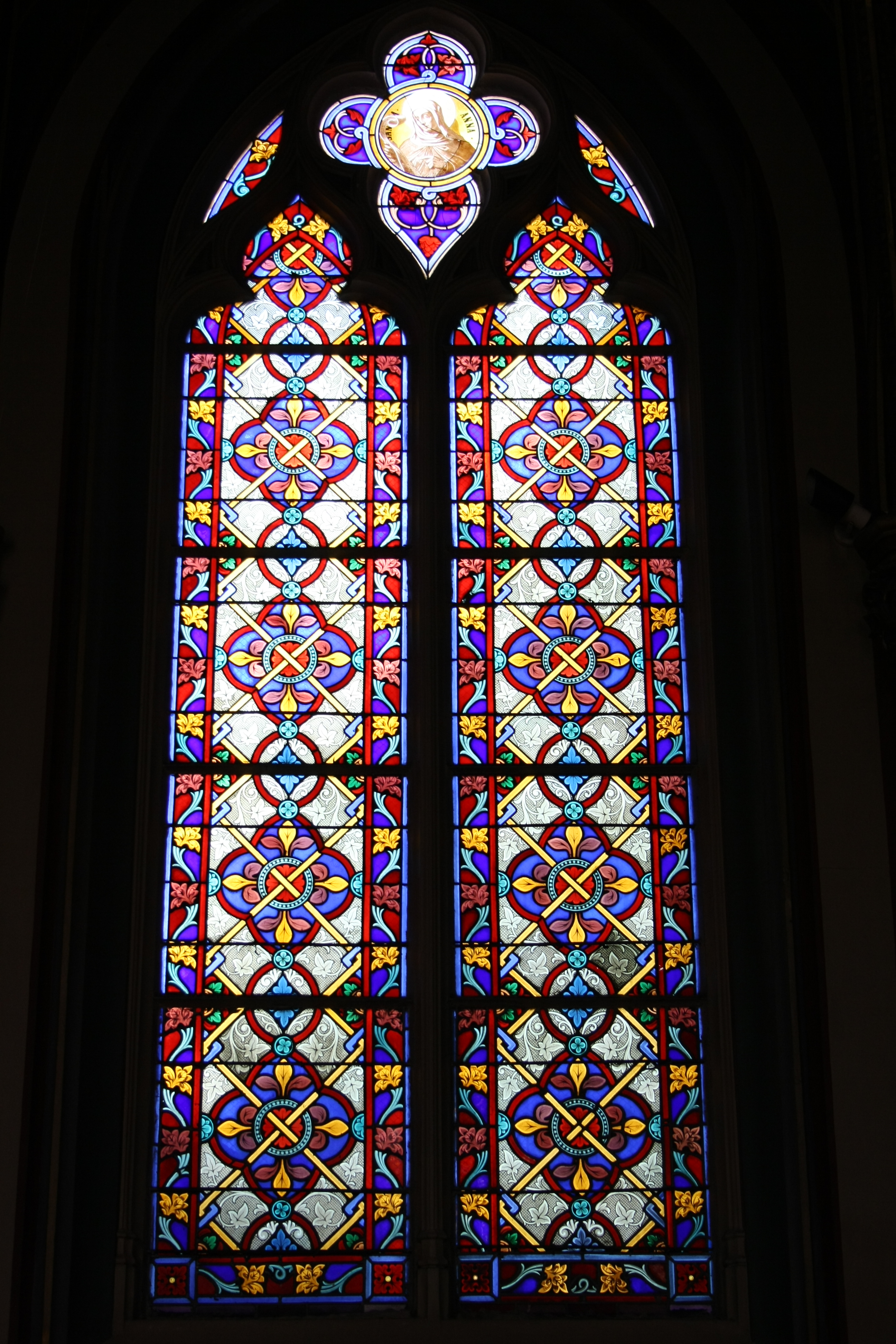
An ornamental window

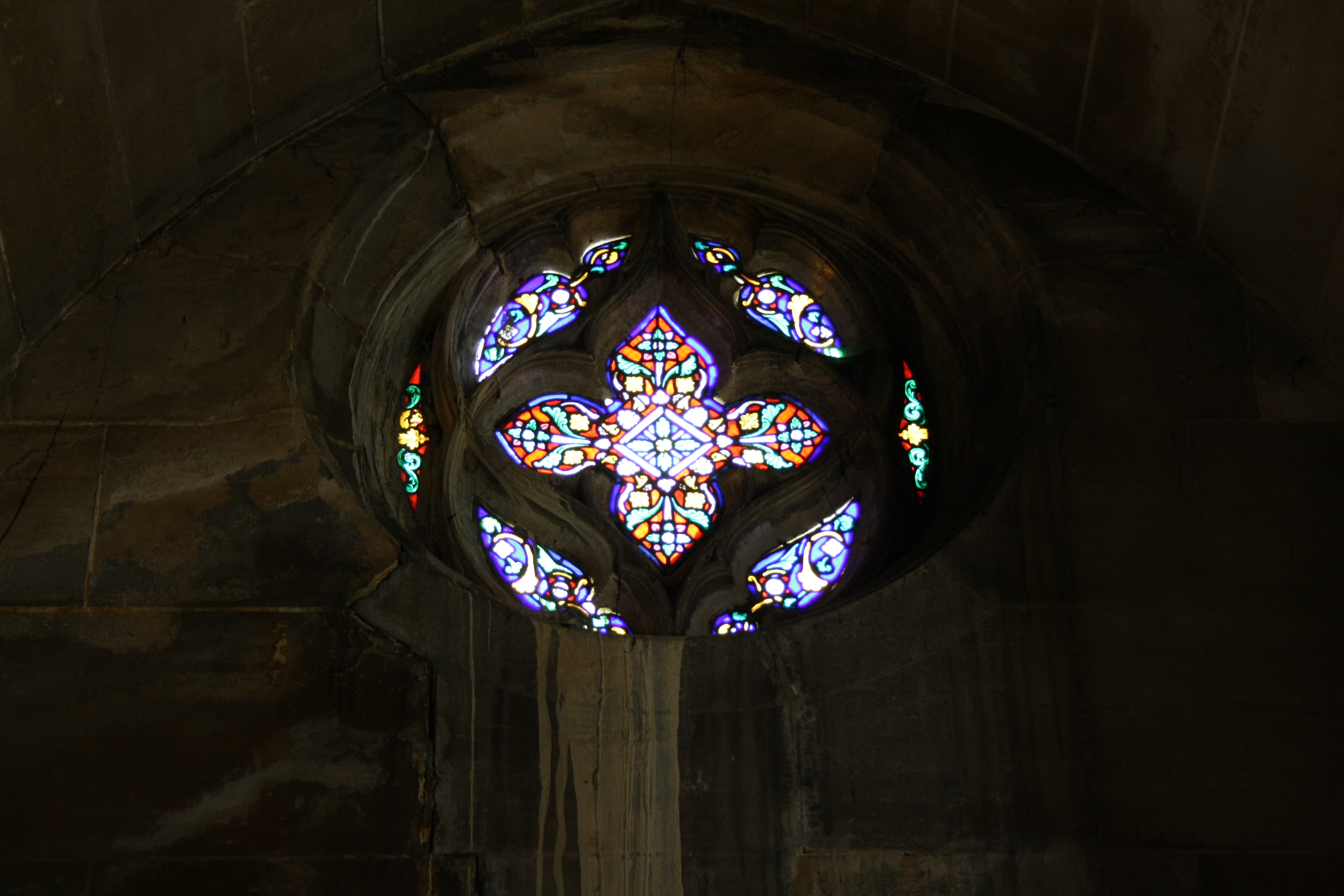
The dome window

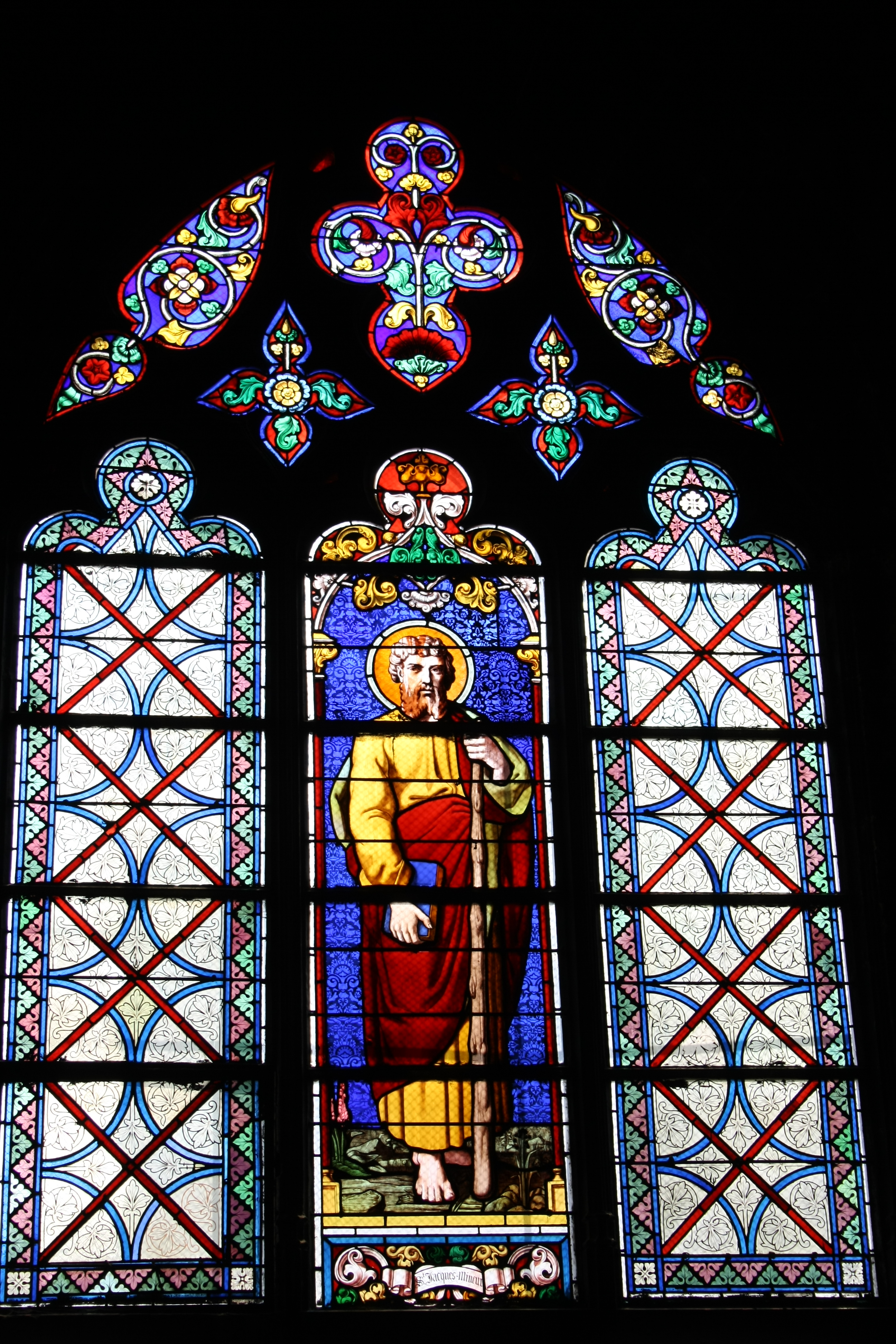
Saint Jacob

The stained glass windows are the work of the studio of Eugène-Stanislas Oudinot. He studied painting with Eugène Delacroix, and combined techniques of painting with traditional stained glass art to produce realistic and colourful windows for many churches of the period.

The choir is decorated with large stained glass windows in abstract designs. Over the triforium are large bay windows with clear glass as well as geometric designs, allowing a maximum of light to enter and to play on the bare walls and vaults.

The chapels along the aisles have more traditional stained glass windows, with figures of Saints and Apostles. which form a chain around the church. These lead to the main element in the choir; a window which depicts the four Evangelists at the feet of Christ, with their symbols; a Bull for Saint Luke; a Lion for Saint Mark; an Eagle for Saint John; and an Angel for Saint Matthew.

=== Painting and sculpture ===
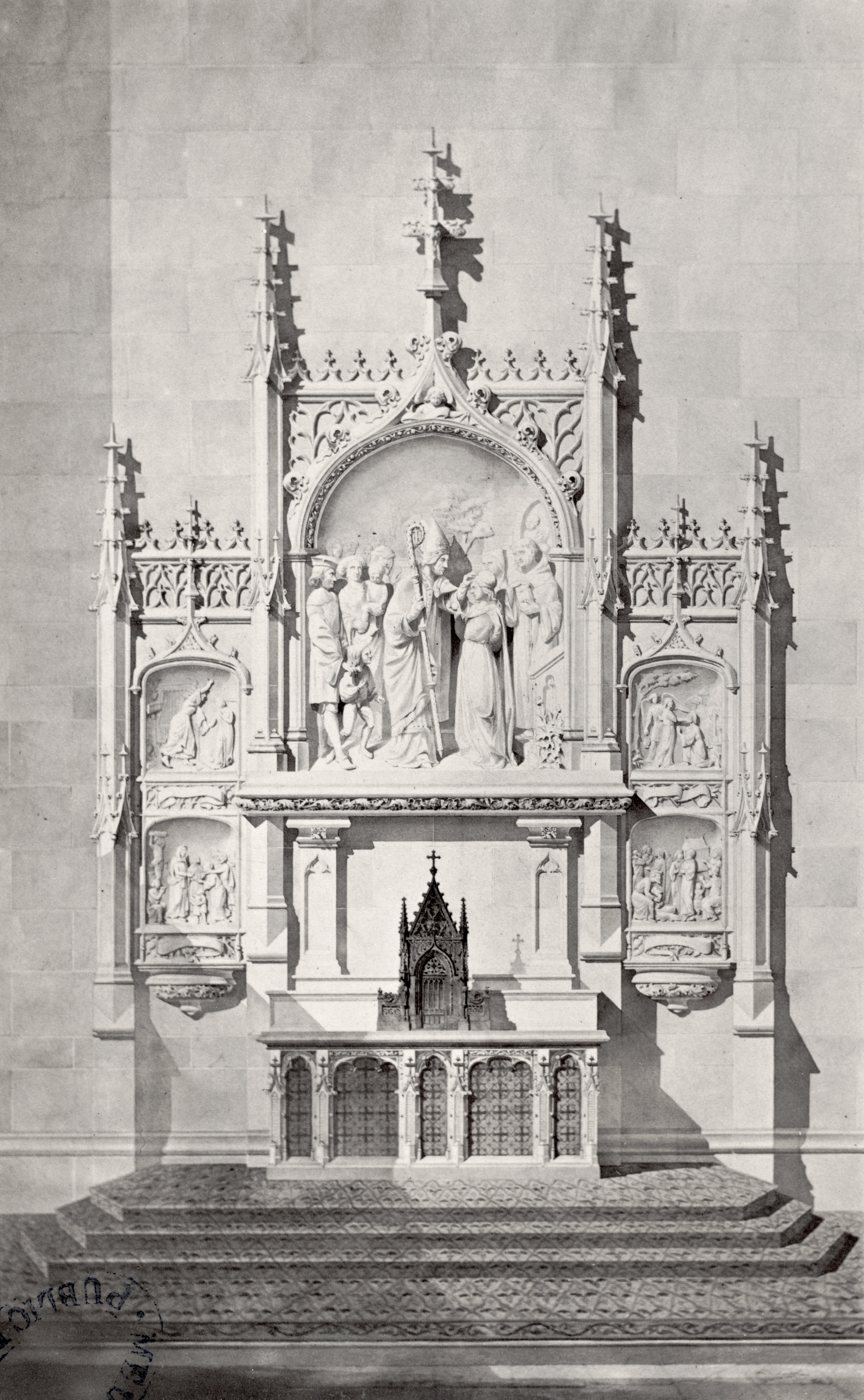
The altarpiece, photographic print by Charles Marville (1850)

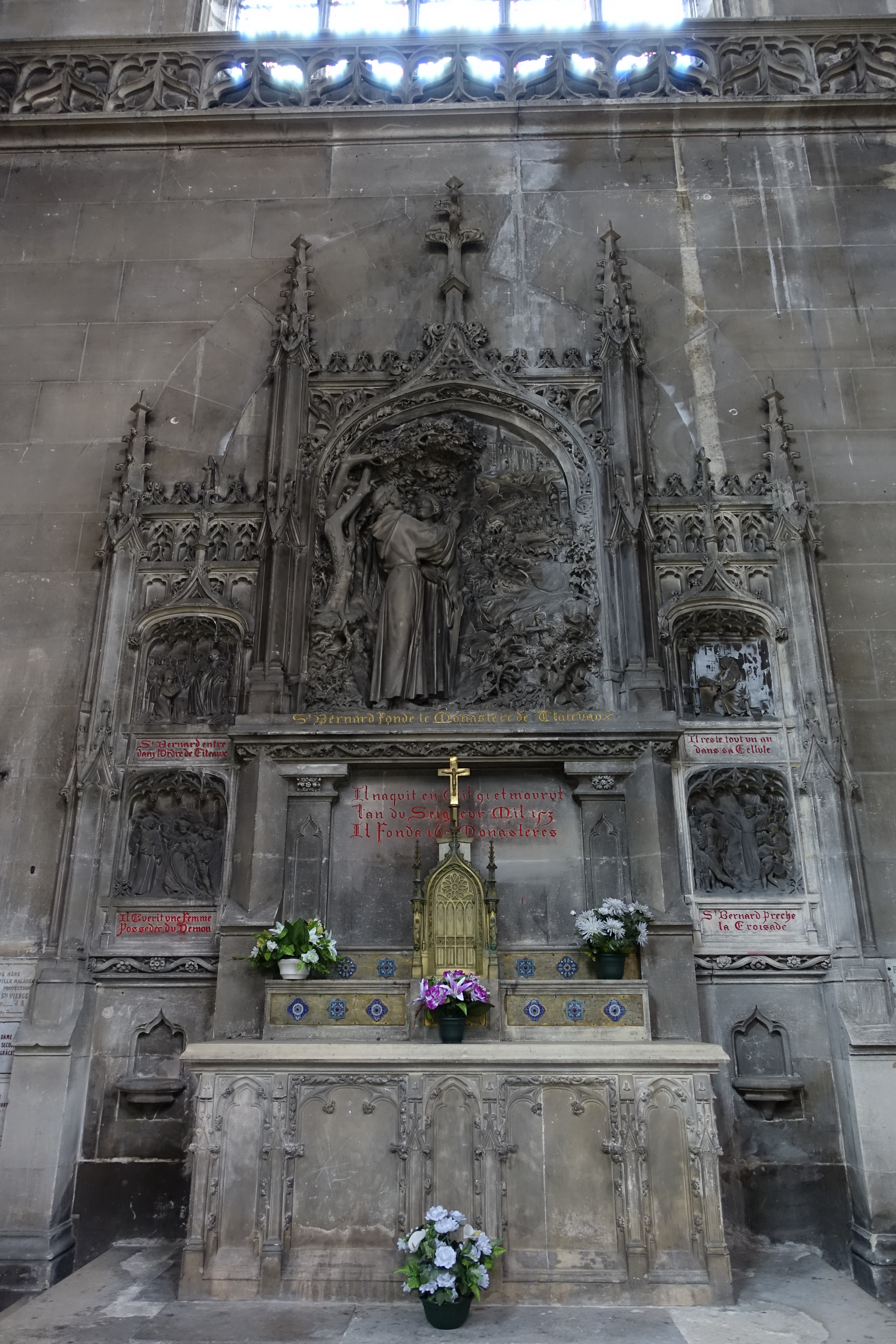
The altarpiece today

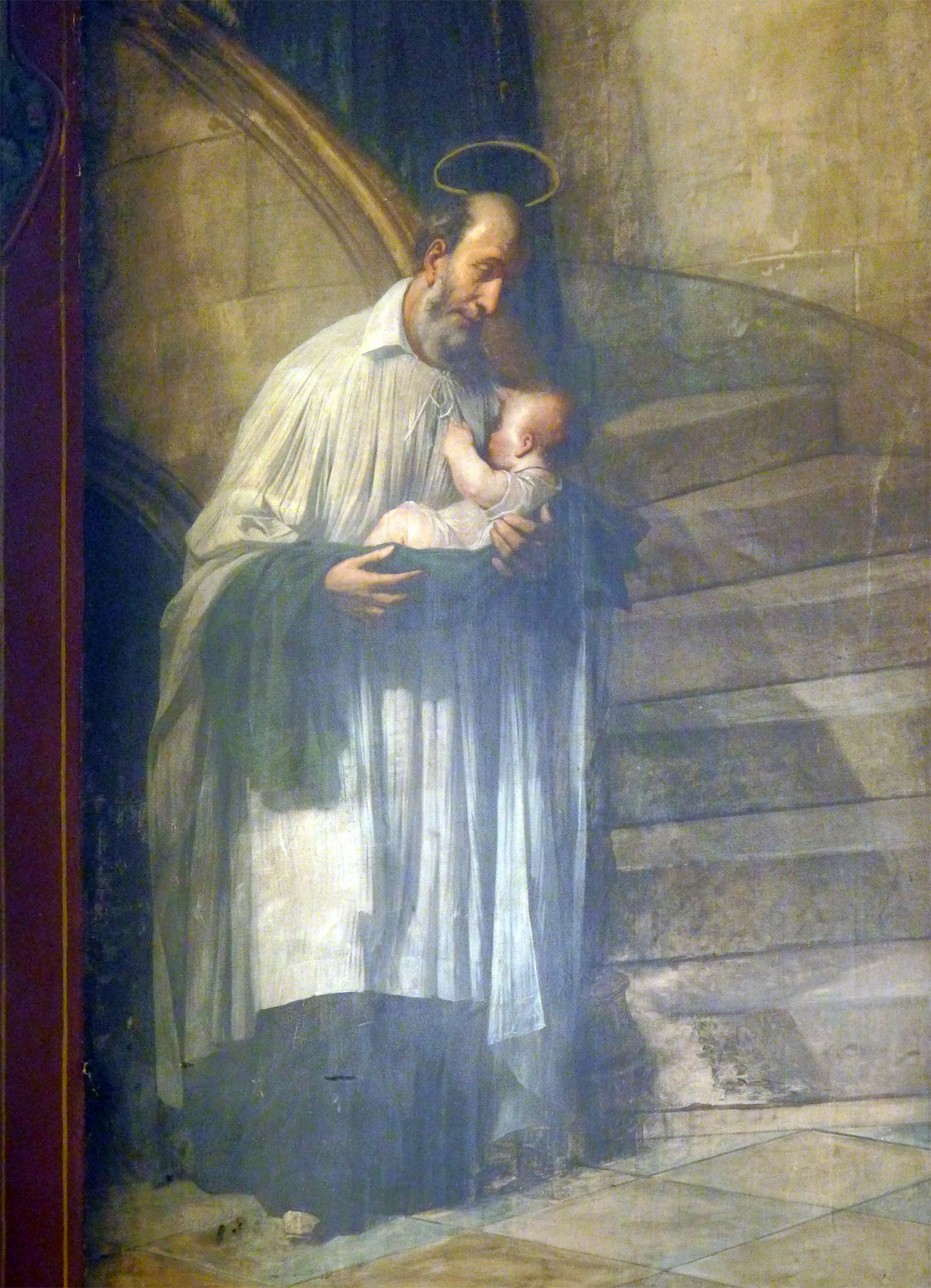
Detail of fresco by Claudius Jacquand

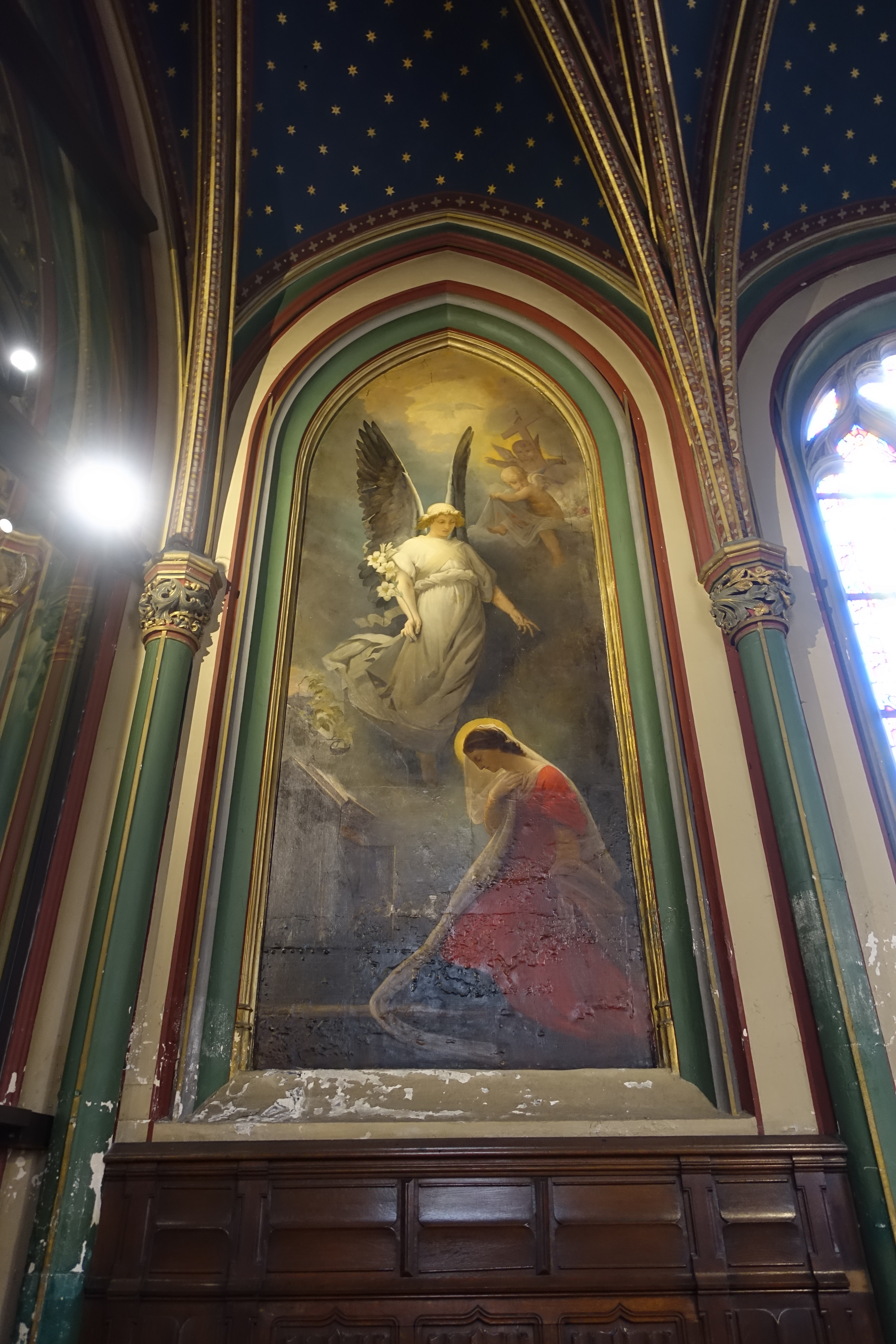
"The Annunciation" by Jean-Georges Vibert (1861)

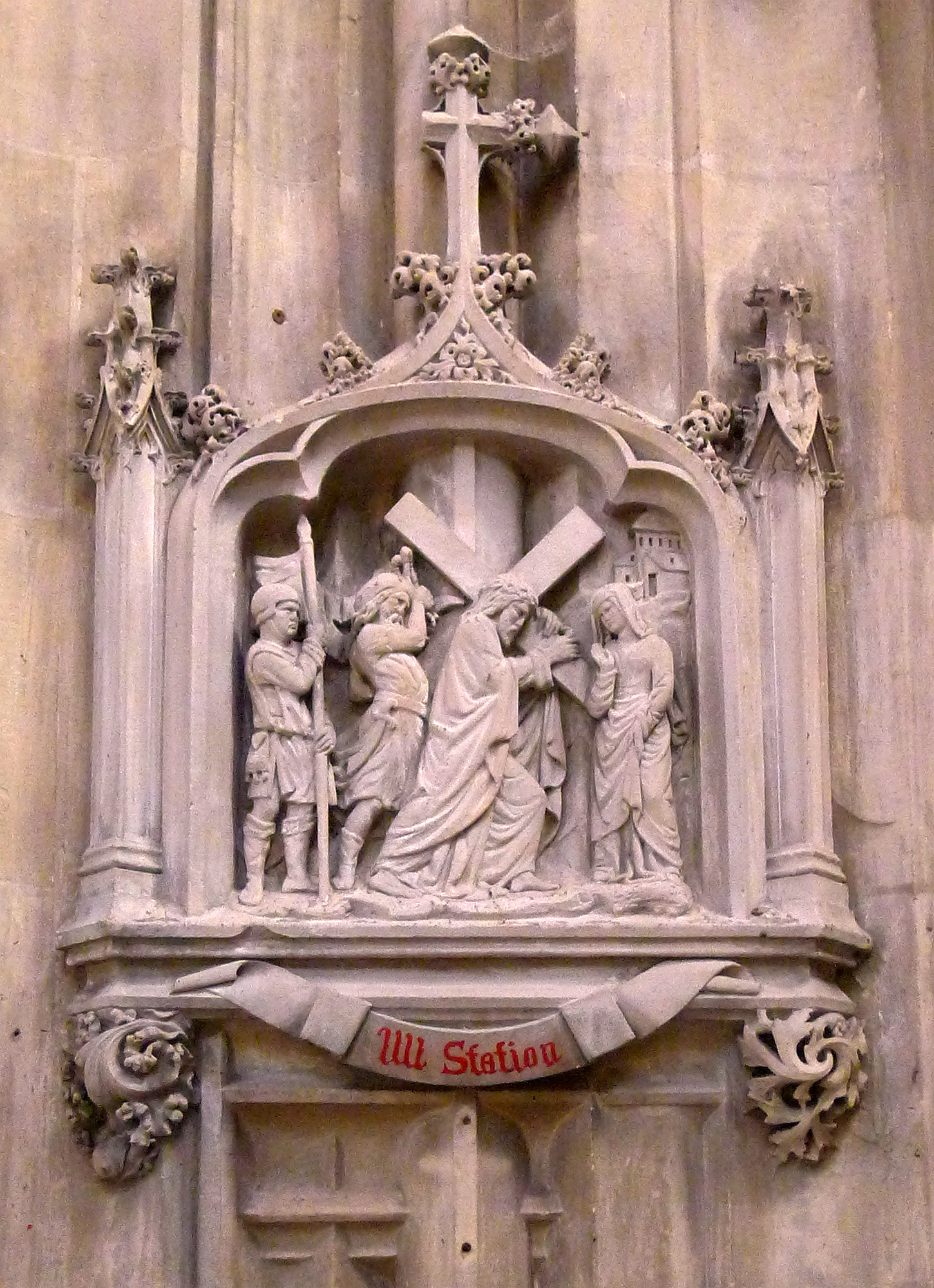
Station of the Pathway of the Cross

=== The Organ ===
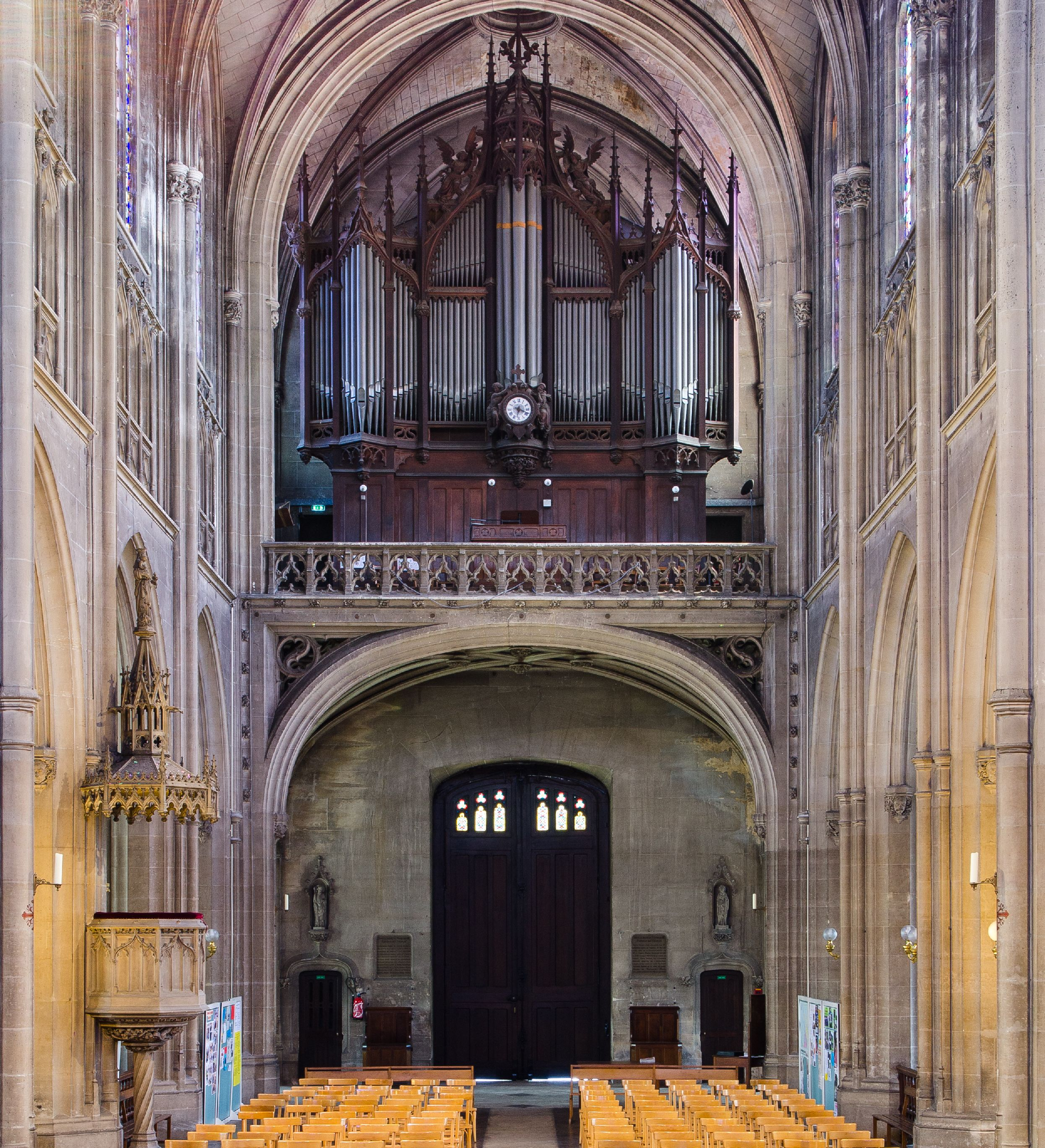
The organ in the tribune, made by Aristide Cavaille-Coll

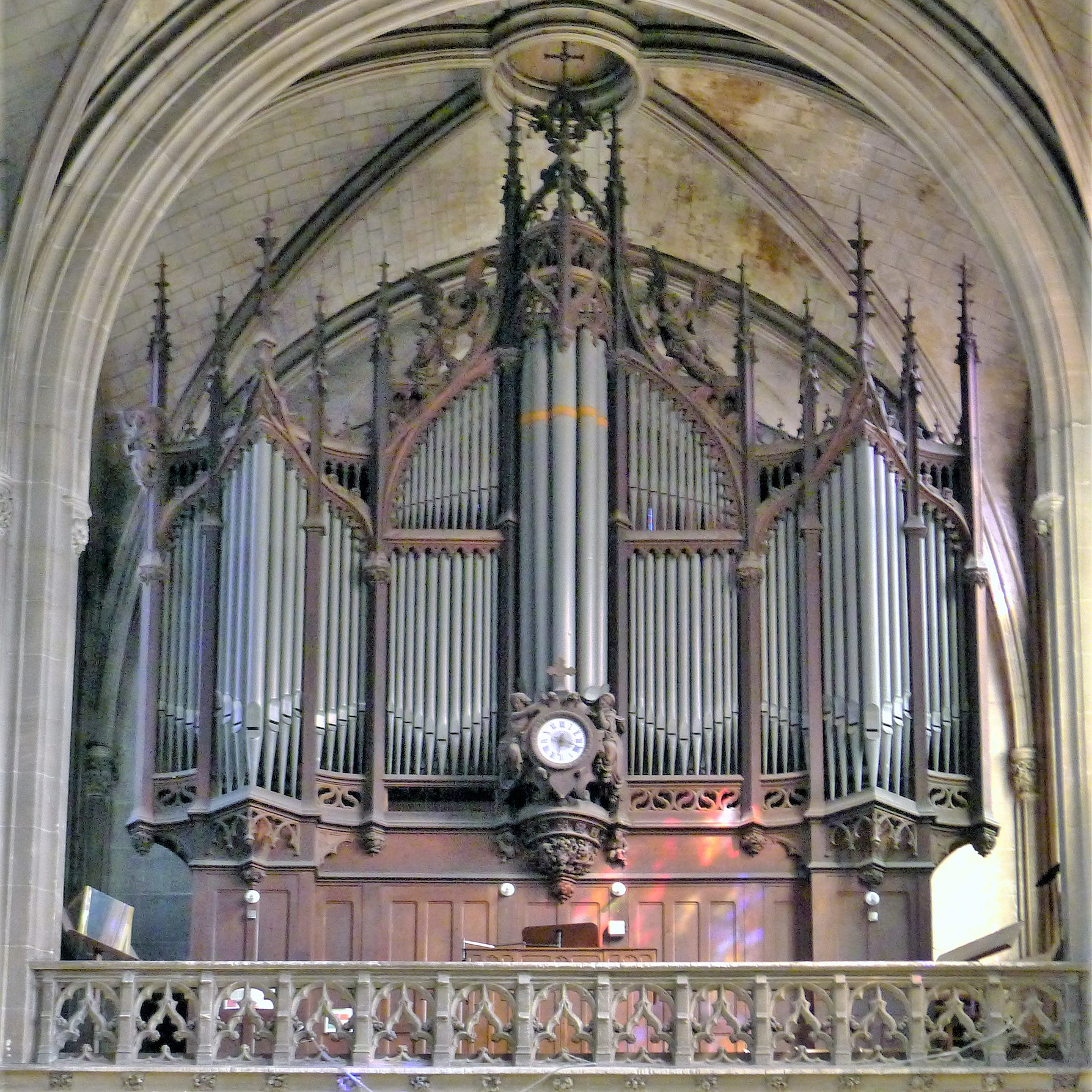
Closer view of the organ, with decorative cabinet made by Henri Parfait.

The organ was made by the workshop of Cavaille-Coll. who built the organs for the Cathedral of Notre-Dame-de-Paris, Church of Saint-Sulpice, the royal chapel of the Basilica of Saint-Denis, the and many other prominent French and European churches. The decorative cabinet that contains the organ was made by the sculptor Henri Parfait.
