= Georges Closson =

French architect (1865–1945)

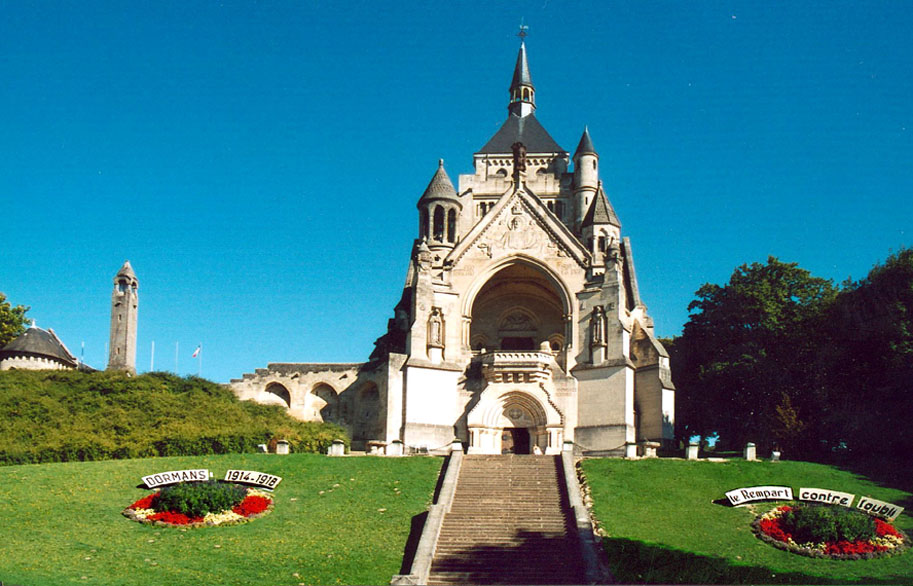
Memorial chapel at Dormans

Georges Alexandre Closson (1865, Reims – 1945, Paris) was a French architect.

== Biography ==
Closson's father, François Closson (1831 – 1874) was a contract metal worker, while his mother, Marie-Emilie Denis (1837 – 1921) was an architect. Closson married Marie-Geneviève Dissard (1868 – 1949) in Paris. Their children were Jean-Emile (1896 – 1940), an architect, and Paul-Charles (1900 – 1973), a chemical engineer.

Closson studied at the École des Beaux-Arts, developing a traditional design style that emphasized a neo-Gothic character, sometimes influenced by his work in Egypt. Closson did, however, take advantage of advances in the use of reinforced concrete and incorporated the technology into his otherwise traditional church designs.

== Works ==
Closson participated in the design of Heliopolis, a new city in the desert near Cairo commenced in 1905. Closson worked with chief architect Alexandre Marcel for developer Édouard Louis Joseph Empain. Closson also executed Marcel's competition-winning design for a memorial chapel commemorating the Battles of the Marne at Dormans, built between 1921 and 1931.

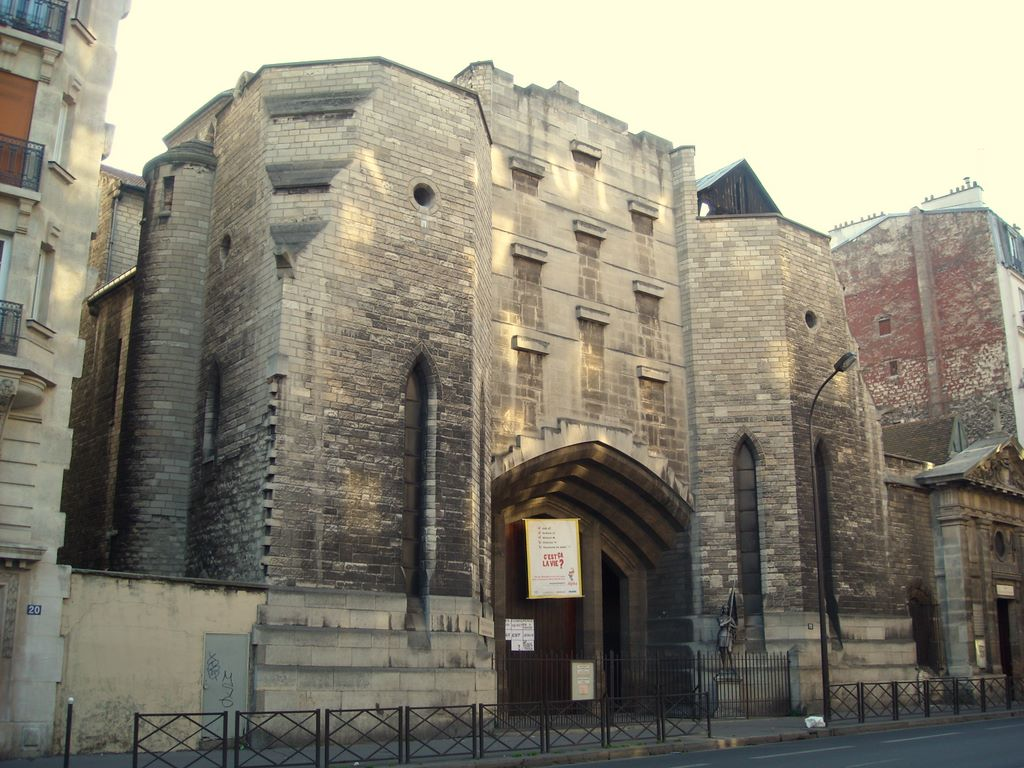
Original façade of the Basilica of Sainte-Jeanne-d'Arc

In 1926 Closson won a design competition for the new Basilica of Sainte-Jeanne-d'Arc in Paris over a competing design by Auguste Perret. The rejection of Perret's ambitious modern design in favor of Closson's more conservative design became a subject of controversy. Closson's design was itself less archeologically correct, nearer in style to the contemporary Église Saint-Pierre-de-Chaillot by Émile Bois. The new basilica was partially completed between 1928 and 1940. Construction was suspended by the Second World War. The church was completed in the 1960s to a more modern design by Pierre Isnard.
