= Sainte-Jeanne-d'Arc, Paris =

Coordinates: 48.8915°N 2.36014°E

Saint Joan of Arc Basilica
- Basilique Sainte-Jeanne-d'Arc
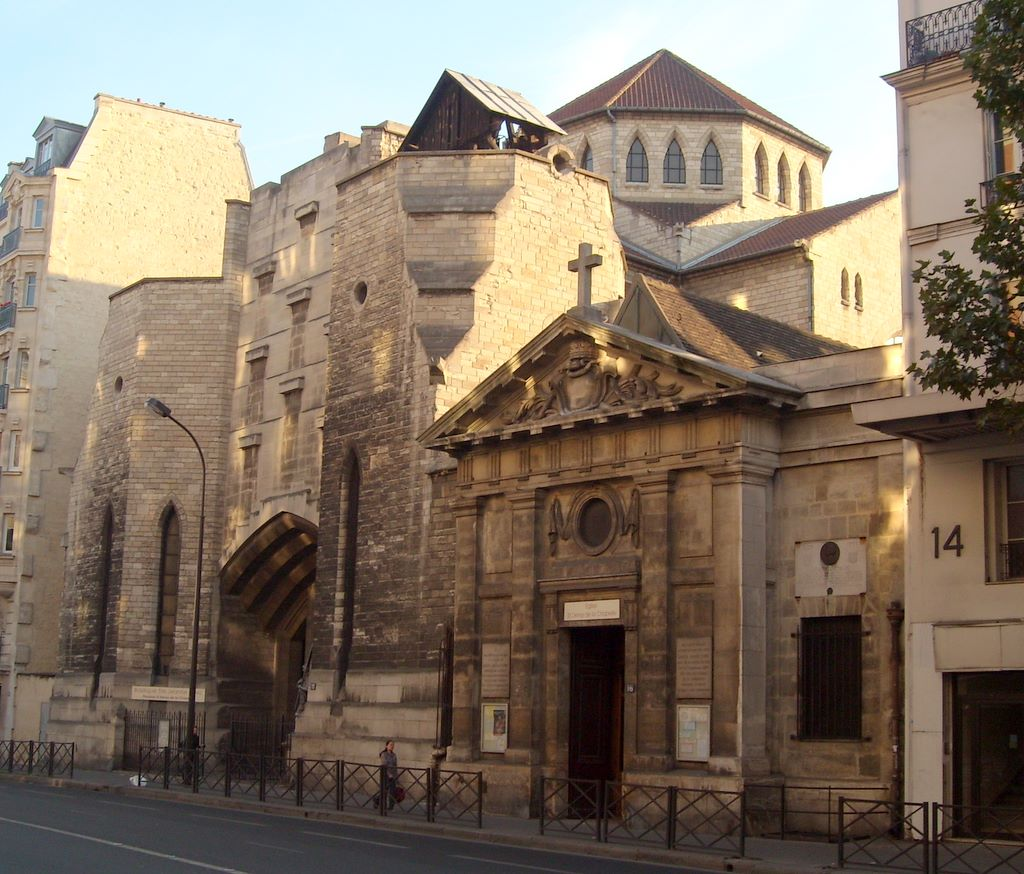
- Original façade on Rue de la Chapelle, with the Church of Saint-Denys de la Chapelle to the right
- Saint Joan of Arc Basilica
- Location: 18th arrondissement of Paris
- Country: France
- Denomination: Roman Catholic Church

The Saint Joan of Arc Basilica (French: Basilique Sainte-Jeanne-d'Arc) is located on the Rue de Torcy and the Rue de la Chapelle in the quartier de la Chapelle of the 18th arrondissement of Paris. Its design was the subject of a contentious design competition. The winning partially-completed design was eventually scrapped in favor of a more modest modernist design.

== History ==
The church was first proposed in 1914 as a votive offering for the safety of Paris during the opening stages of World War I, which was attributed to the intervention of Joan of Arc. The new church was to be built next to the only Parisian church known to have been visited by Joan, the church of Saint-Denys de la Chapelle, where Joan prayed one night in 1429.

In 1926 a contest was announced by the archdiocese of Paris for the design of a large church. Several designs were proposed. A design by Auguste Perret created a sensation with a 200-meter bell tower of reinforced concrete and stained glass. The Perret design was rejected in favor of a design by Georges Closson. Perret eventually used the scaled-down design for the emblematic church of St Joseph in Le Havre.

Closson proposed an eclectic design dominated by towers that flanked the entry and rose until they joined in a massive Gothic arch. The nave consisted of three bays, each capped by a cupola and flanked on either side by gabled projections with round windows. A narrower apse completed the composition.

Work began in 1930 on Closson's design, but progressed slowly and only the lower façade was built. The proposed tower-arch was not completed and the first cupola was incorporated into a narthex. After a long pause the main church, extending into the Place de Torcy was completed in an entirely different design in reinforced concrete in 1964 under the direction of architect Pierre Isnard. Isnard's design followed Closson's footprint, but substituted a simple box covered by a folded-plate concrete roof. The church's stained glass was executed by Leon Zack, while a statue of Joan of Arc was carried out by Maxime Real del Sarte.
