= Saint-Denys de la Chapelle =

Church of Saint-Denys de la Chapelle
- Église Saint-Denys de la Chapelle
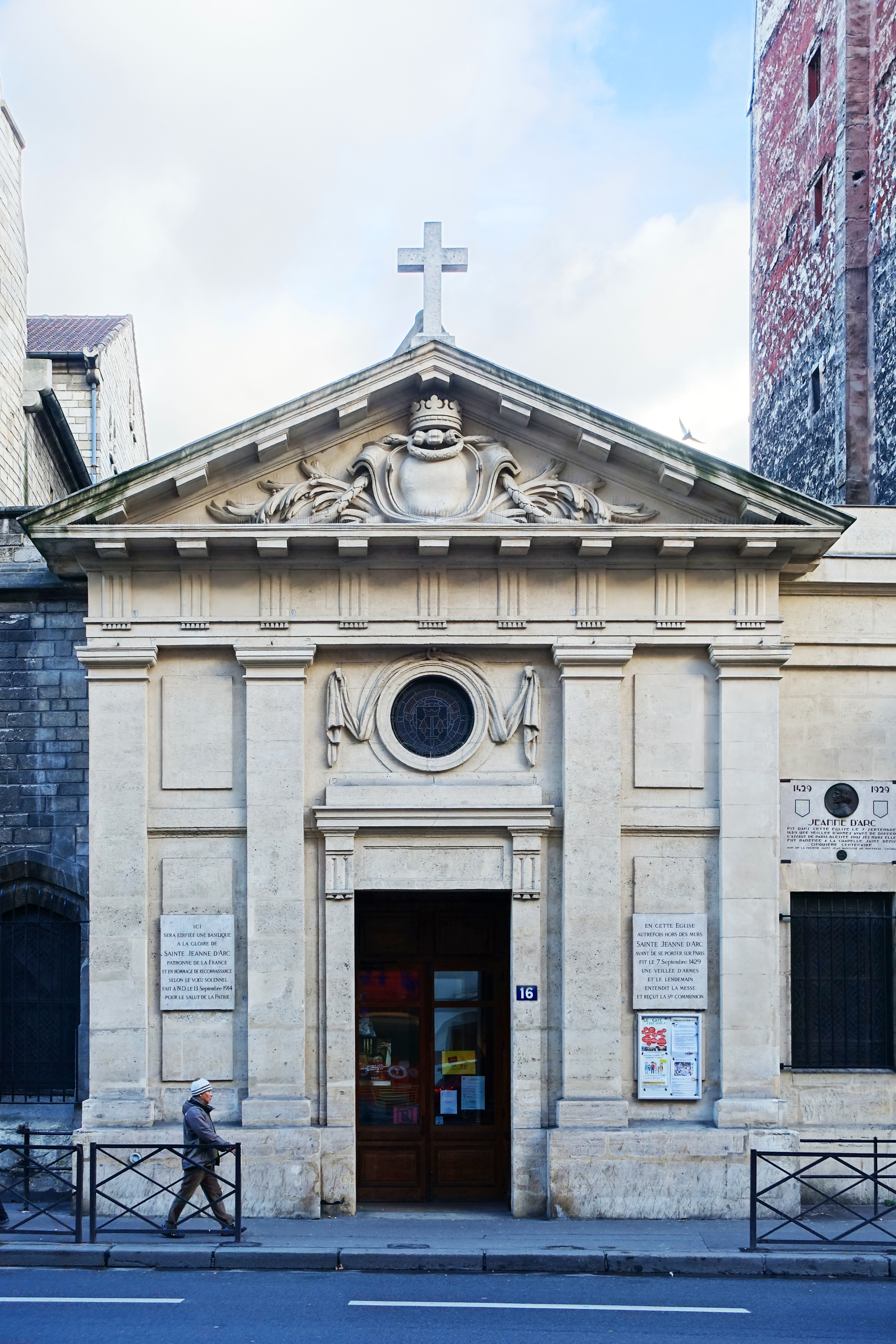
- Church of Saint-Denys de la Chapelle
- Location: 18th arrondissement Paris
- Country: France
- Denomination: Roman Catholic

History
- Status: Parish church

Architecture
- Functional status: Active
- Architect: George Closson
- Completed: 1204 (present building)

Administration
- Archdiocese: Paris
- Parish: Saint-Denys de la Chapelle

Saint-Denys de la Chapelle is a church in the 18th arrondissement of Paris. The interior dates to 1204, making it one of the oldest in Paris. The facade was added in the 18th century.

== History ==
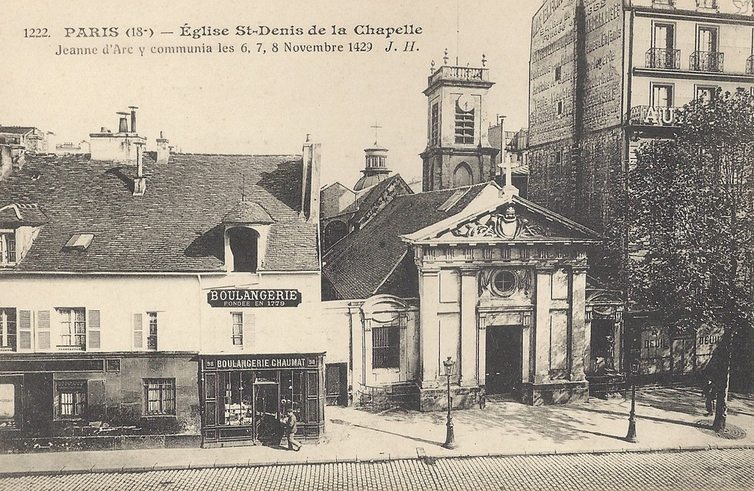
The church in 1900, with bell tower

According to legend, around 475 Saint Genevieve purchased land and built the first chapel on the site, to hold the relics of Denis of Paris, who first established Christianity in France. The Rue de la Chapelle, where the church is located, has existed since Gallo-Roman times, running from the suburb of Saint-Denis to the center of Paris. Due to the relics, the church became an important pilgrimage site. The relics remained there until 636 when, on the orders of Dagobert I, they were reinterred in the new Basilica of Saint-Denis. Without the relics, the church fell into disrepair. In the 9th century, the chapel was destroyed by the Vikings.

A new church was built in 1204, in the early Gothic style which was strongly influenced by Romanesque architecture. The church was burned by the English in 1358, but restored. According to a legend, Joan of Arc spent a night of prayer in the church in 1429, just before her unsuccessful attack on the Burgundians who had occupied Paris. Beginning in 1930, and to offer thanks for what was viewed as the intervention of Saint Joan in the French victory at the First Battle of the Marne in the First World War, a much larger new church, the Basilica of Sainte-Jeanne-d'Arc, was built next to it.

== Exterior ==
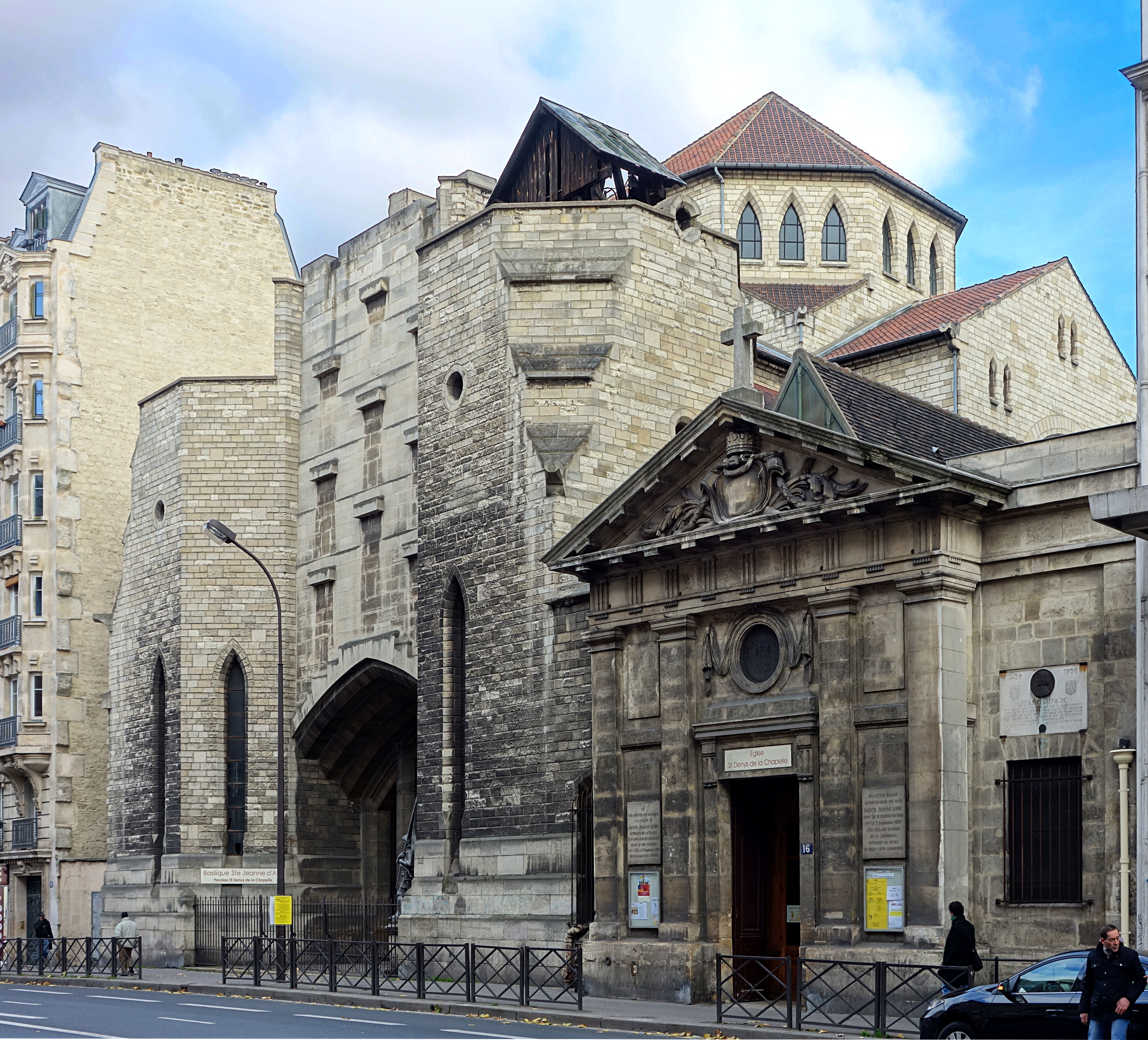
The church with the neighboring Sainte-Jeanne-d'Arc, Basilica

The exterior of the church is largely overshadowed by the more recent Basilica of Sainte-Jeanne-d'Arc, which looms over it. The classical facade of church on rue de la Chapelle was added in 1757. It has a small porch framed by four Doric order pilasters, and is topped by a triangular pediment. The church originally had a bell tower, built in 1770 and taken down in 1930.

A plaque on the facade and another in the interior commemorates the visit of Jeanne d'Arc to the chapel on September 7, 1429. The chapel at that time was well outside the walls of Paris, She attended mass and took communion. The next day she led an assault on the city, in an unsuccessful attempt to expel the British and their Burgundian allies.

== Interior ==
The interior of the church is a good example of the transition from Romanesque to Gothic architecture. The traverses of the nave and choir are covered with examples of the four-part rib vault. The nave is lined with aracades of columns with Gothic capitals. which separate it from the collateral aisles. The arches in the aisles are rounded, a heritage of the earlier Romanesque style. A massive cruciform pillar is located in the first traverse of the nave. It originally supported the bell tower, added to the church in 1770 and taken down in 1930.

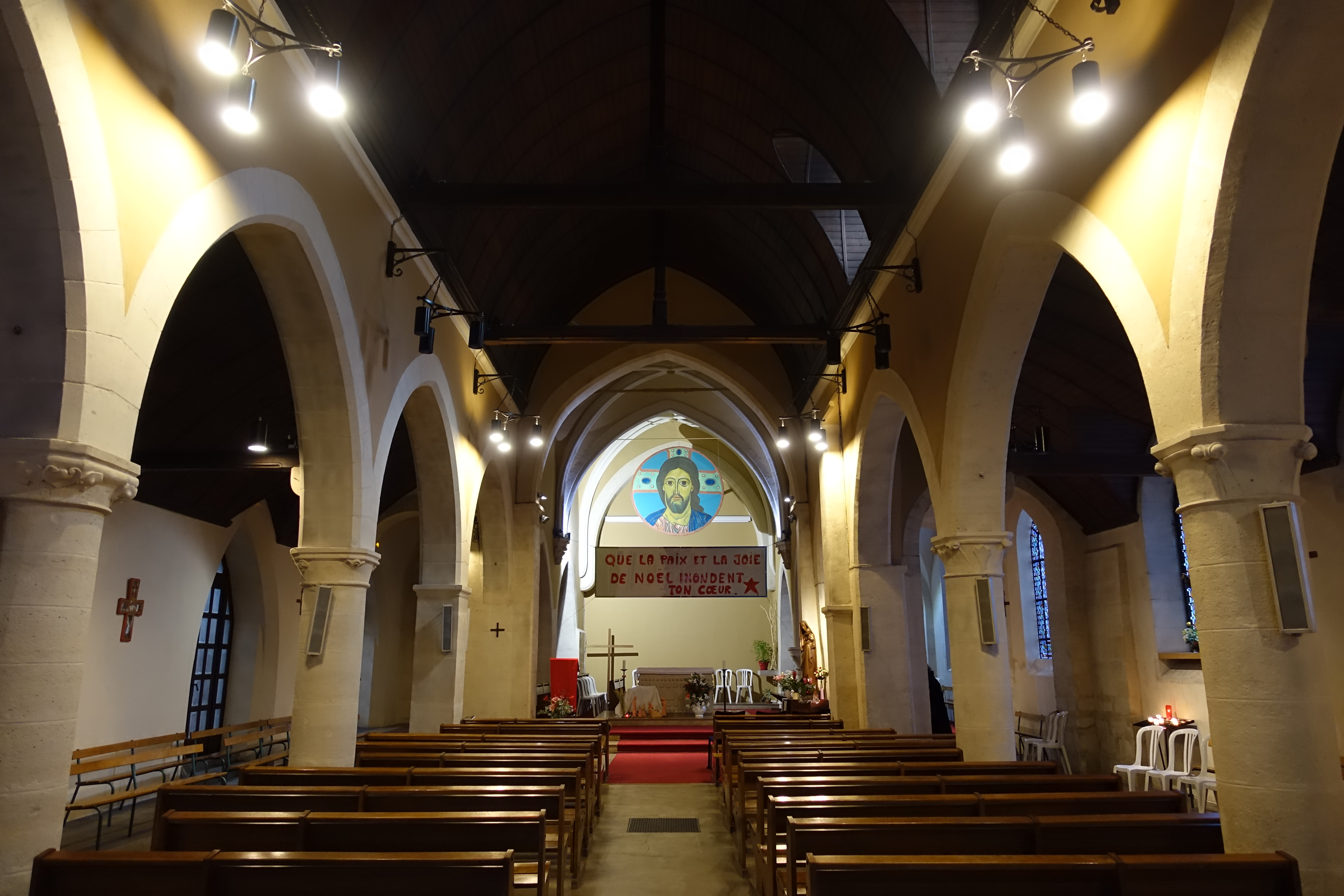
The nave, facing the choir (2016)

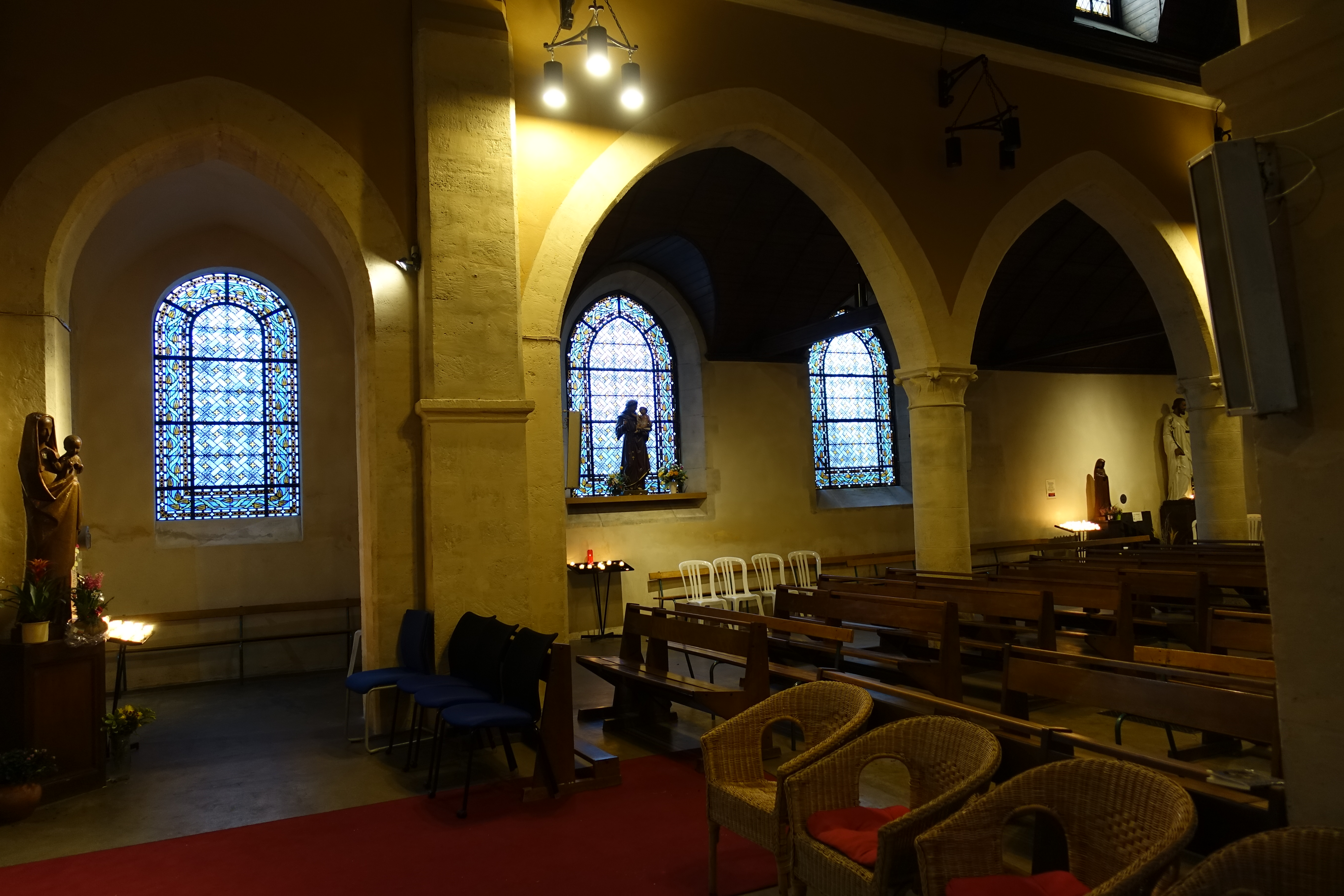
Collateral aisle and stained glass

== Art and decoration ==
While the structure is early Gothic, most of the art and decoration is more recent, from the 19th and 20th century. The stained glass windows from this period feature elaborate geometric designs.

A sculpture in the collateral aisle depicts Joan of Arc on the bonfire, vividly depicting her torment. It was made by Albert Pasche (1873–1964), to commemorate the visit of Joan to the church in 1429. Another sculpture, at entrance, depicts Saint Joseph holding the Christ child. This sculpture has color, adding a touch of brightness to the otherwise sober interior.

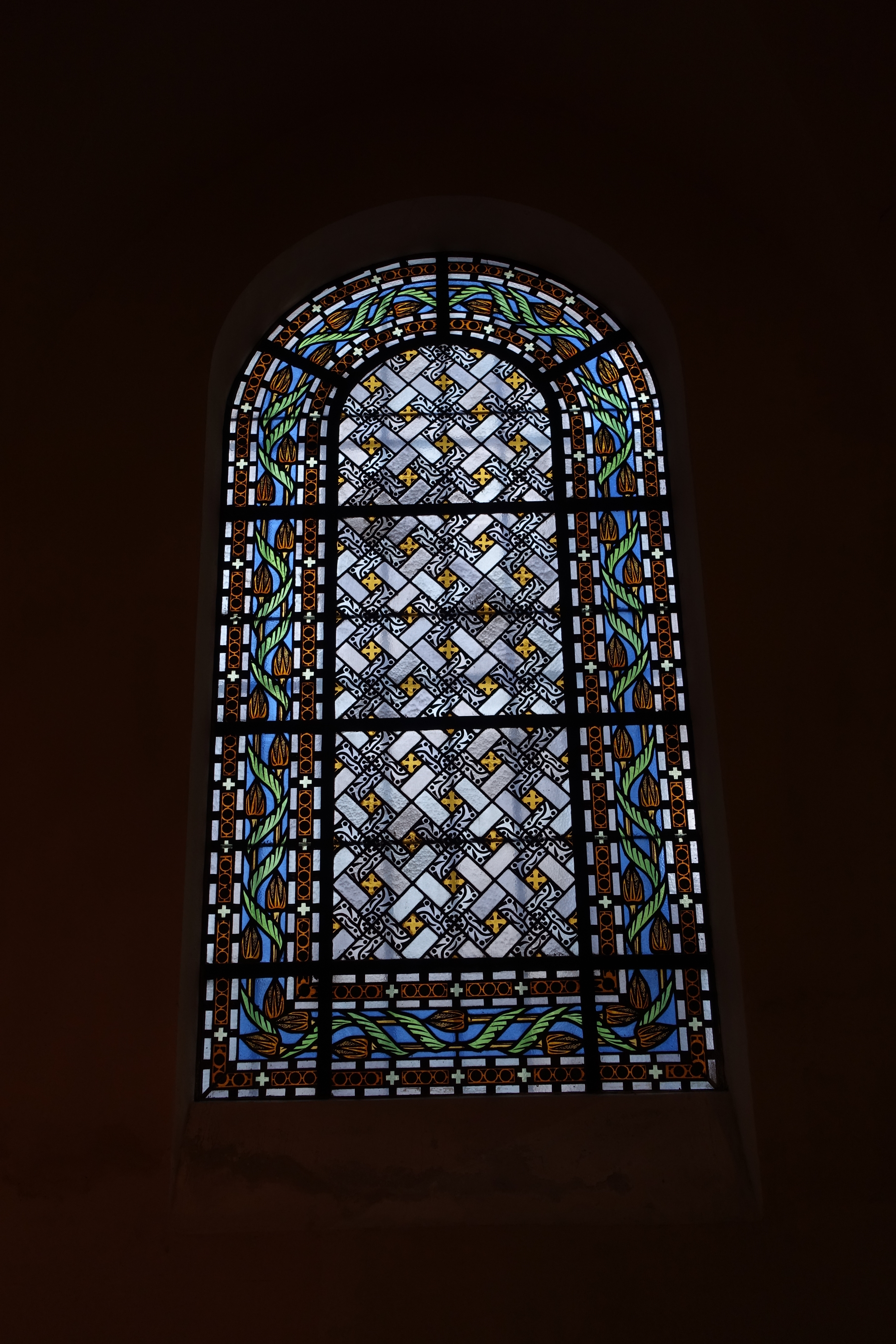
Stained glass in geometric designs

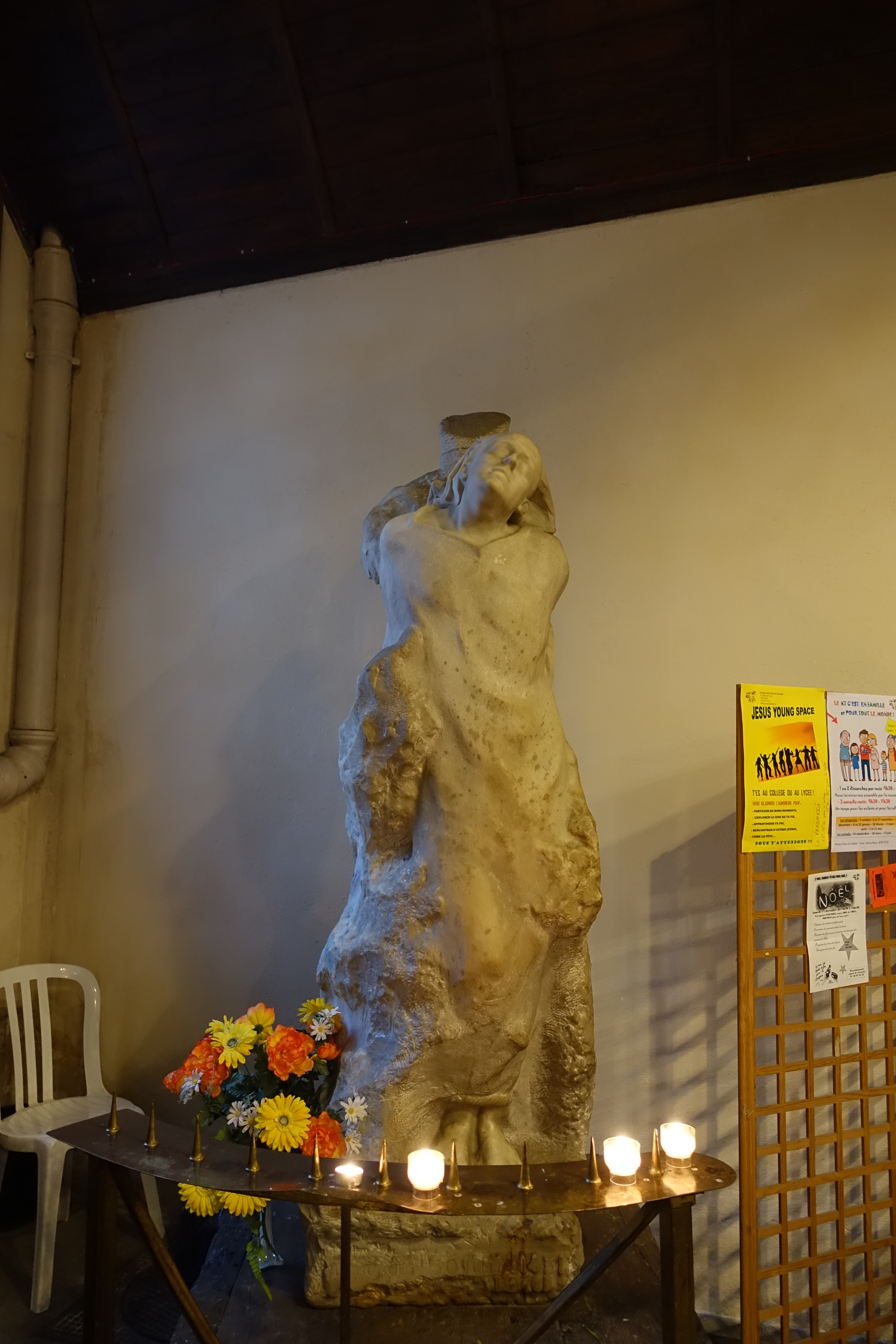
Joan of Arc on the bonfire

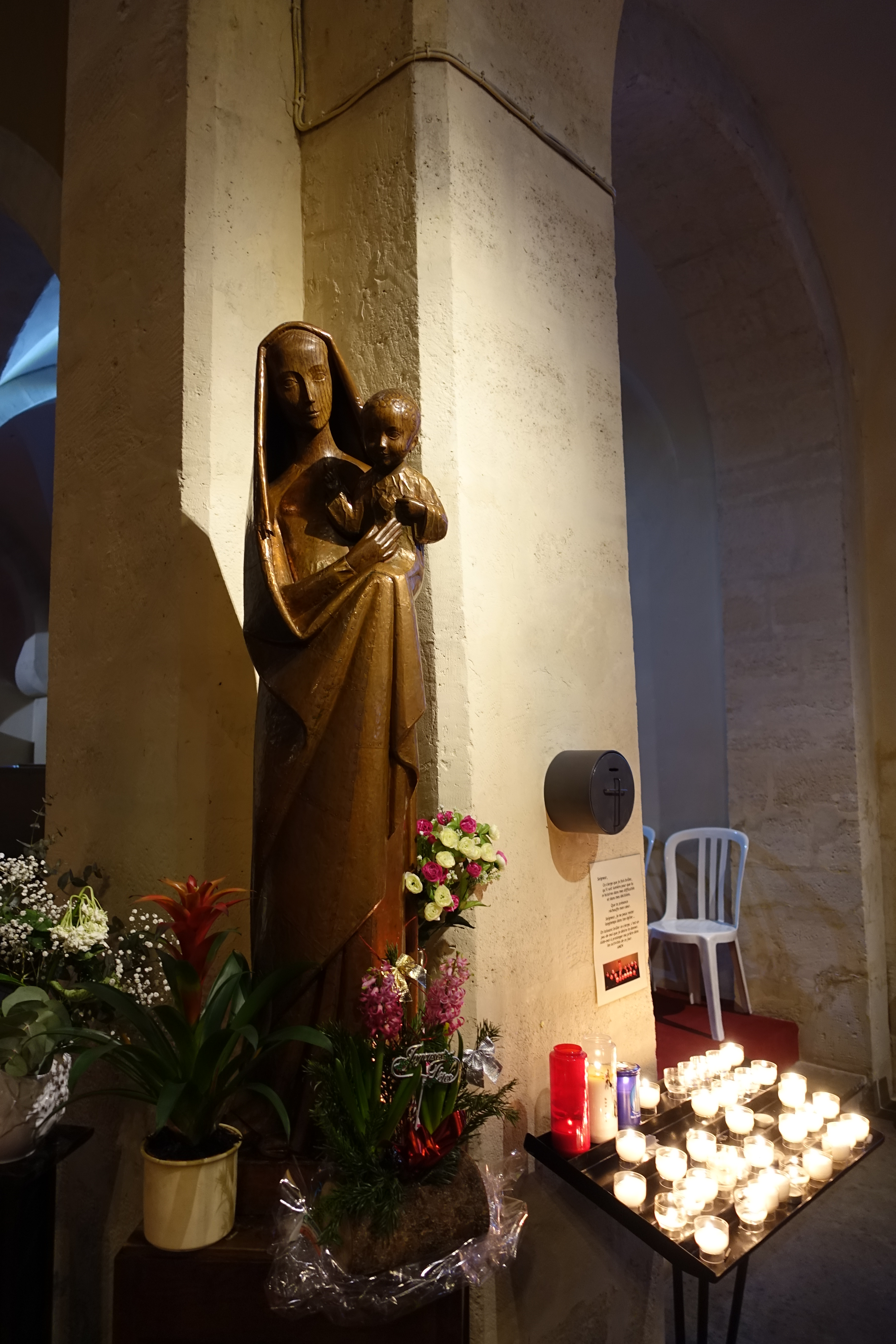
The Virgin Mary and Child

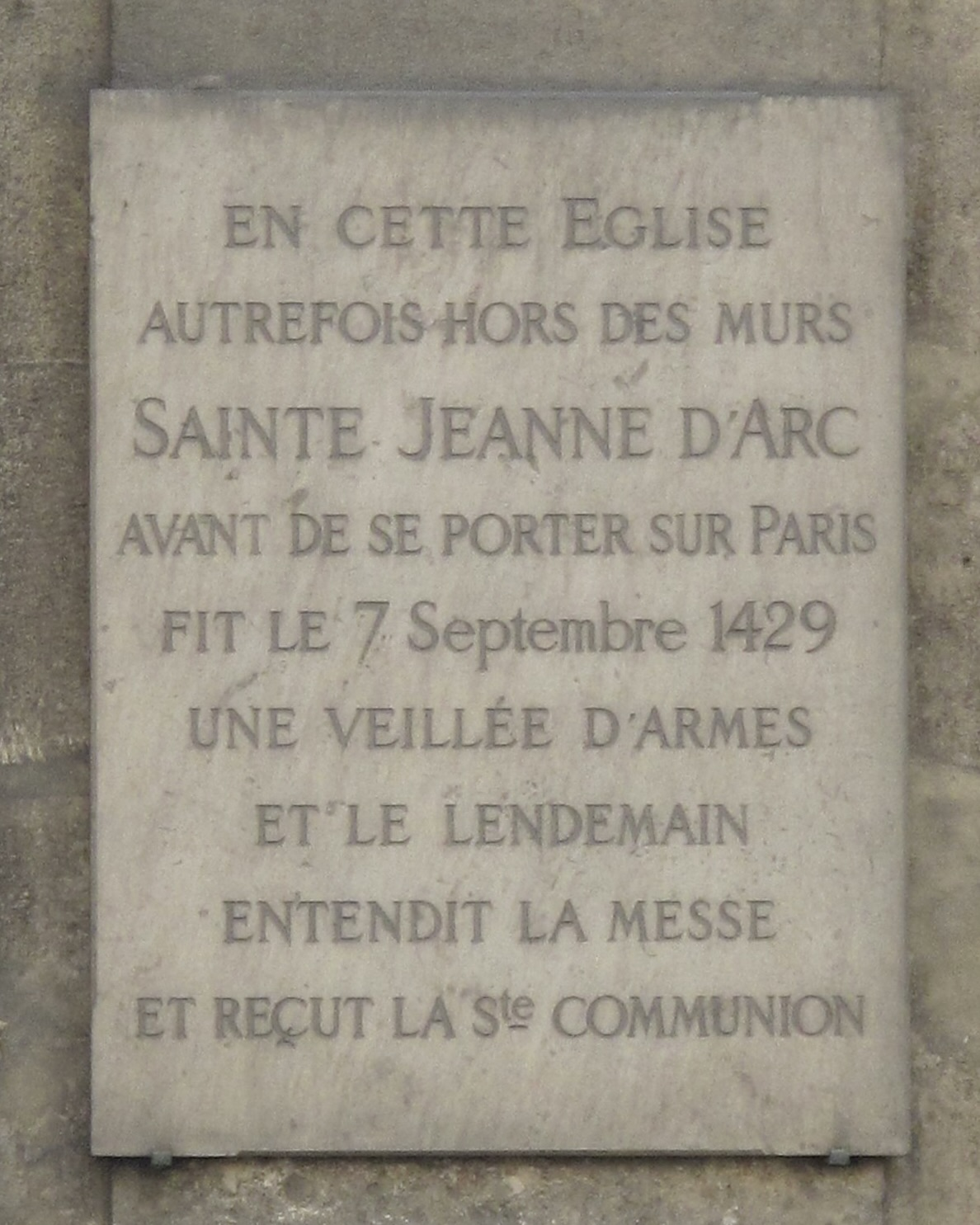
A plaque commemorates the visit of Joan of Arc to the church in 1429

== See also ==
- List of historic churches in Paris
- La Chapelle (Seine)
