= Marx Dormoy station =

Metro station in Paris, France

Marx Dormoy
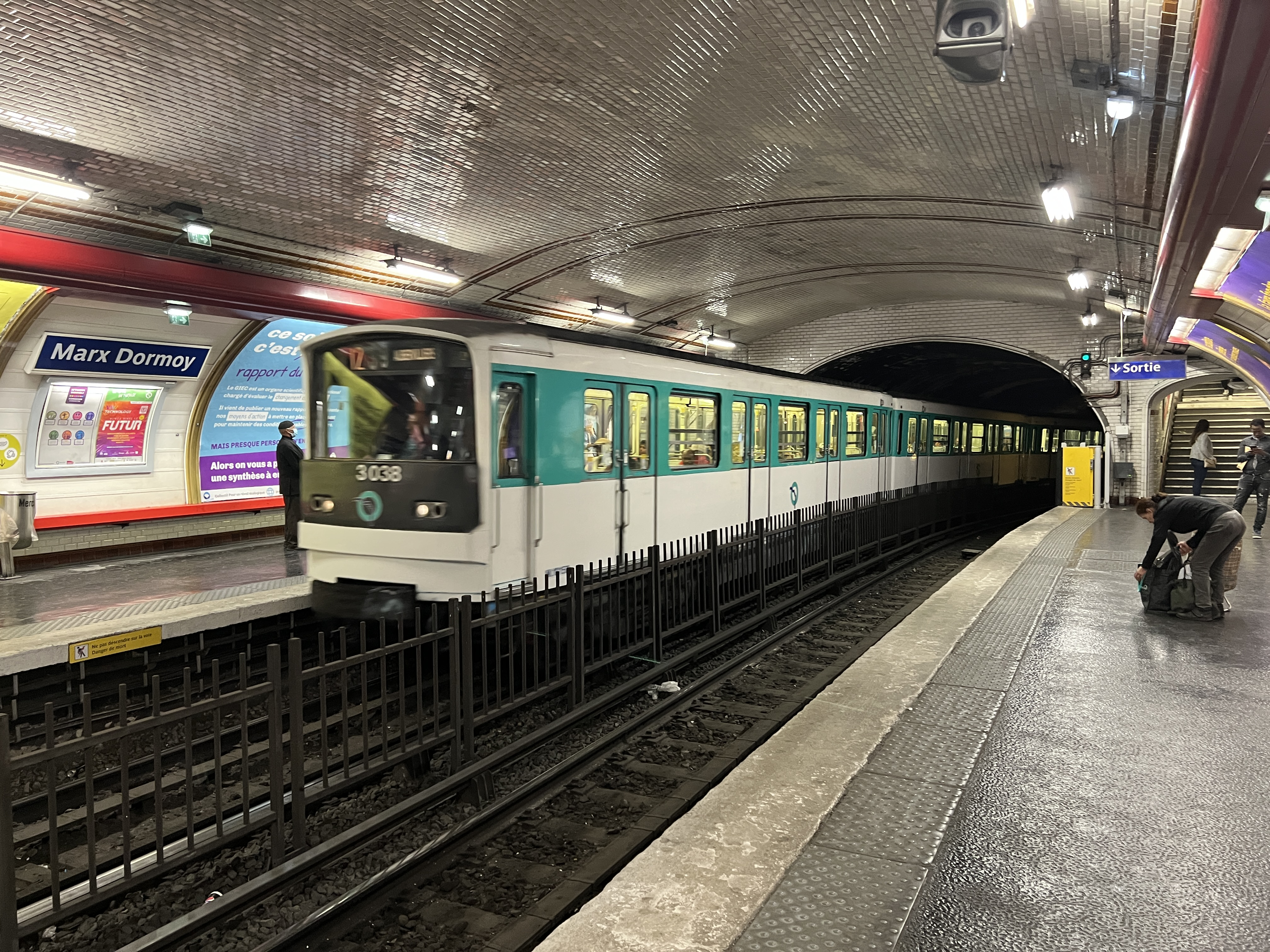

General information
- Location: 18th arrondissement of Paris; Île-de-France; France
- Coordinates: 48°53′28″N 2°21′36″E
- System: Paris Métro station
- Owner: RATP
- Operator: RATP

Other information
- Fare zone: 1

History
- Opened: 23 August 1916

Services
Preceding station	Paris Metro	Following station
Marcadet–Poissonniers towards Mairie d'Issy	Line 12	Porte de la Chapelle towards Mairie d'Aubervilliers
Location
- Location within Paris

Marx Dormoy (French pronunciation: [maʁks dɔʁmwa]) is a station on line 12 of the Paris Métro in the districts of La Chapelle and Goutte d'Or and the 18th arrondissement.

The station opened on 23 August 1916 as part of the extension of the Nord-Sud company's line A from Jules Joffrin to Porte de la Chapelle. On 27 March 1931 line A became line 12 of the Métro.

The station is named after Marx Dormoy (1888–1941), a French socialist politician assassinated by Cagoulards. Until 1946 it was called Torcy after the Place de Torcy, named after Colbert de Torcy (1665–1746), who was a nephew of Colbert and a diplomat and Foreign Minister under Louis XIV.

Nearby is the church of Jeanne d'Arc, where Joan of Arc prayed on 3 September 1429 and the la Chapelle market.

== Station layout ==
Street Level

B1	Mezzanine

Line 12 platforms	Side platform, doors will open on the right
Line 12 platforms	Southbound	← toward Mairie d'Issy (Marcadet – Poissonniers)
Line 12 platforms	Northbound	toward Mairie d'Aubervilliers (Porte de la Chapelle) →
Line 12 platforms	Side platform, doors will open on the right
