= Marcadet–Poissonniers station =

Metro station in Paris, France

Marcadet–Poissonniers
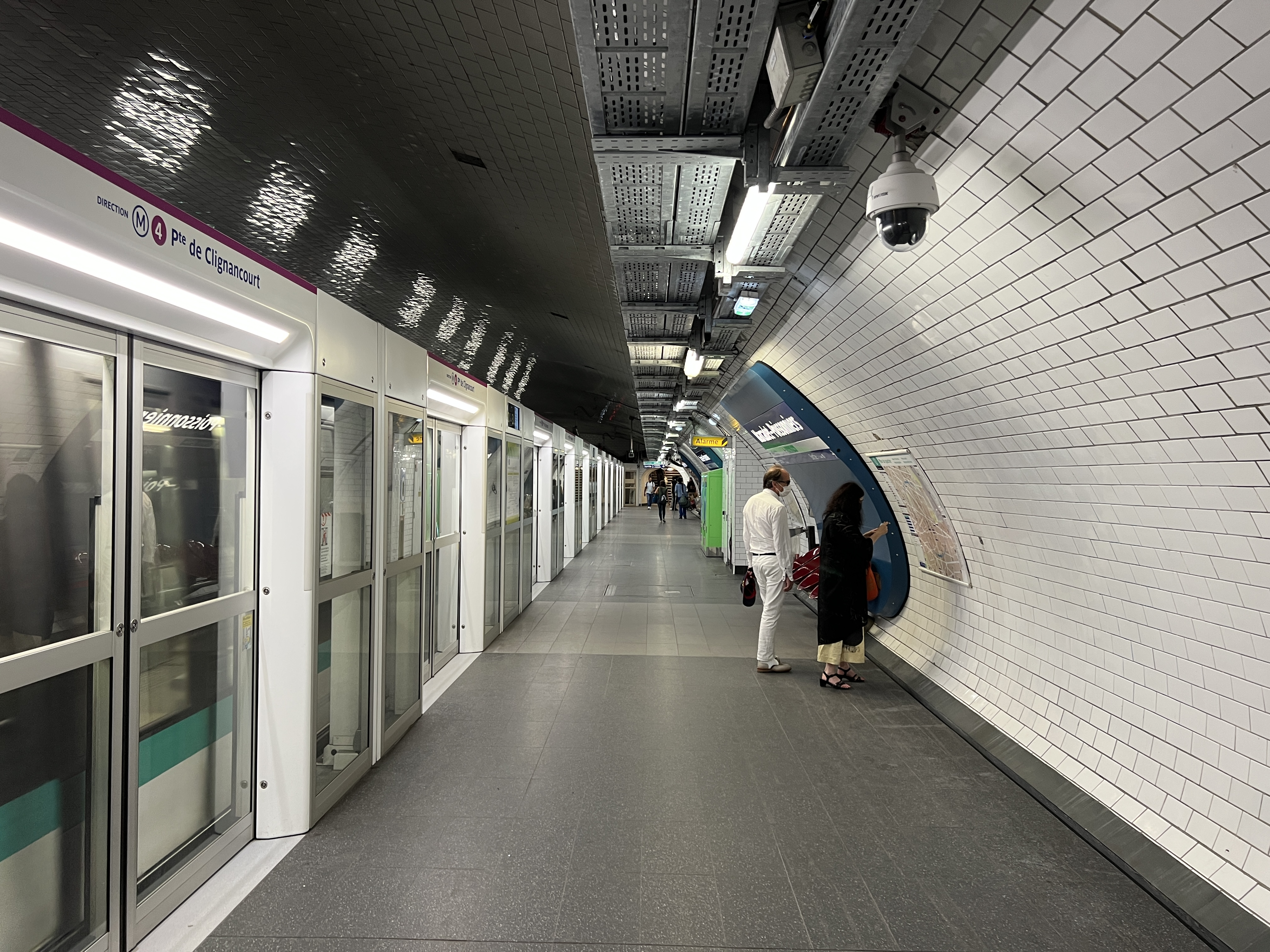
- Line 4 platforms at Marcadet–Poissonniers

General information
- Location: 69, boul. Barbès; 80, boul. Barbès; 86, boul. Barbès; 26 ter, rue Ordener; 69, rue des Poissonniers; 18th arrondissement of Paris; Île-de-France; France
- Coordinates: 48°53′25″N 2°21′00″E
- Owner: RATP
- Operator: RATP

Other information
- Fare zone: 1

History
- Opened: 25 August 1931; 95 years ago

Services
Preceding station	Paris Metro	Following station
Château Rouge towards Bagneux–Lucie Aubrac	Line 4	Simplon towards Porte de Clignancourt
Jules Joffrin towards Mairie d'Issy	Line 12	Marx Dormoy towards Mairie d'Aubervilliers
Location
- Location within Paris

Marcadet–Poissonniers (French pronunciation: [maʁkadɛ pwasɔnje]) is a station of the Paris Métro, serving Line 4 and Line 12.

Previously, there were two stations. Marcadet on Line 4 (operated by the CMP) opened on 21 April 1908 as part of the first section of the line from Châtelet to Porte de Clignancourt. Poisonniers on Line 12 (then operated by the Nord-Sud Company as line A) opened on 23 August 1916 as part of the extension from Jules Joffrin to Porte de la Chapelle. When the CMP took over the Nord-Sud in 1930, the two stations were joined with an underground corridor. The joined station opened on 25 August 1931 under its current name. The name Marcadet is taken from the Rue Marcadet (from the Latin mercadus, "market"), which name appears on medieval maps, and from the Rue des Poissonniers, used since the Middle Ages by fishmongers (French: poissonniers) to bring fish from the North Sea to the markets at Les Halles.

== Station layout ==
Street Level

Line 4 platforms	Side platform, with PSDs doors will open on the right
Line 4 platforms	Northbound	← toward Porte de Clignancourt (Simplon)
Line 4 platforms	Southbound	toward Bagneux–Lucie Aubrac (Château Rouge) →
Line 4 platforms	Side platform, with PSDs doors will open on the right

Line 12 platforms	Side platform, doors will open on the right
Line 12 platforms	Southbound	← toward Mairie d'Issy (Jules Joffrin)
Line 12 platforms	Northbound	toward Mairie d'Aubervilliers (Marx Dormoy) →
Line 12 platforms	Side platform, doors will open on the right

== Gallery ==
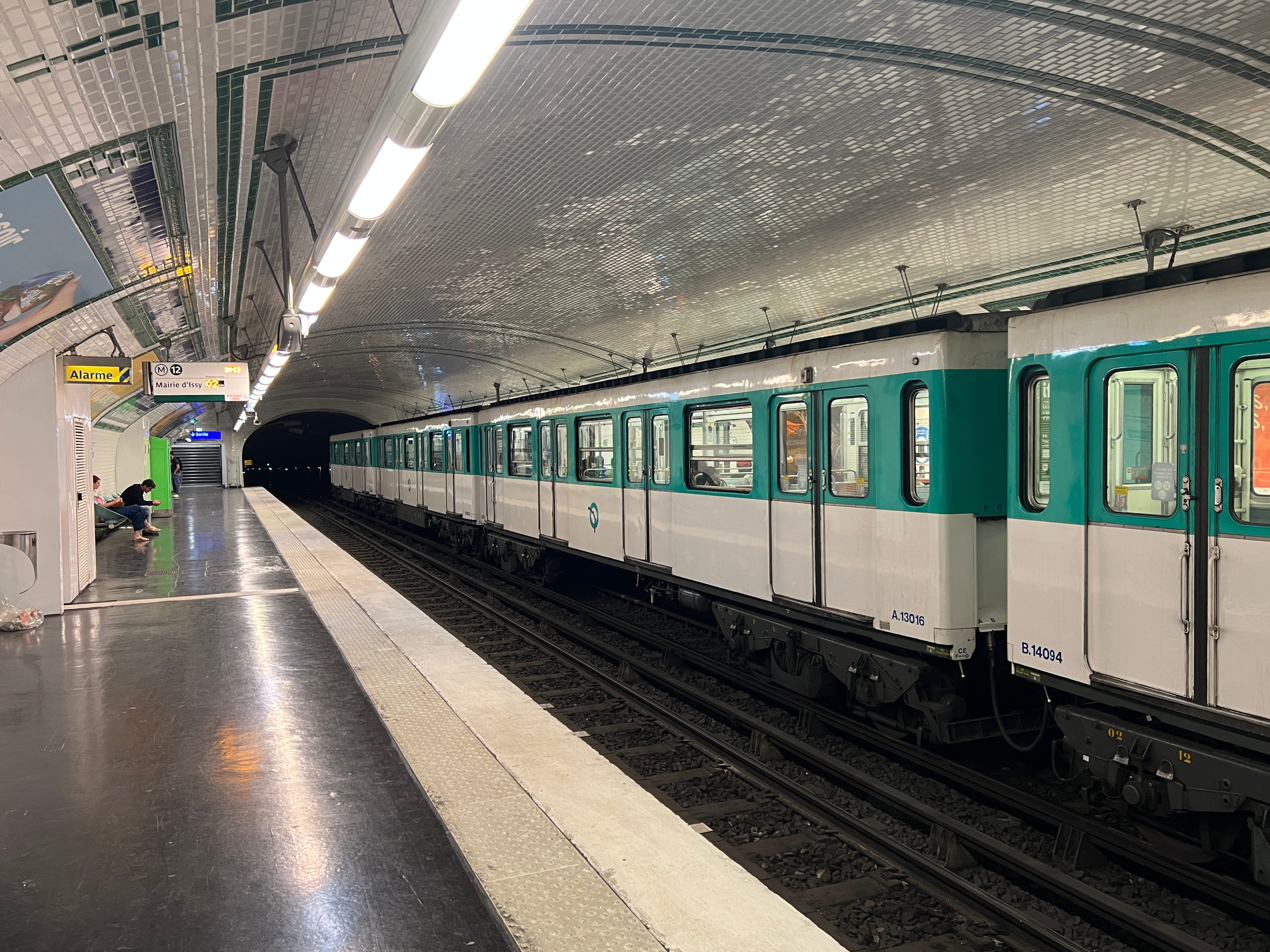
Line 12 platforms at Marcadet–Poissonniers
