= Joffrin =

Joffrin is a French surname. Notable people with the surname include:

- Jules François Alexandre Joffrin (1846–1890), French politician
- Laurent Joffrin, editor-in-chief of Le Nouvel Observateur

== See also ==
- Jules Joffrin (Paris Métro), station on Line 12 of the Paris Métro
