= Simplon station =

Metro station in Paris, France

Simplon
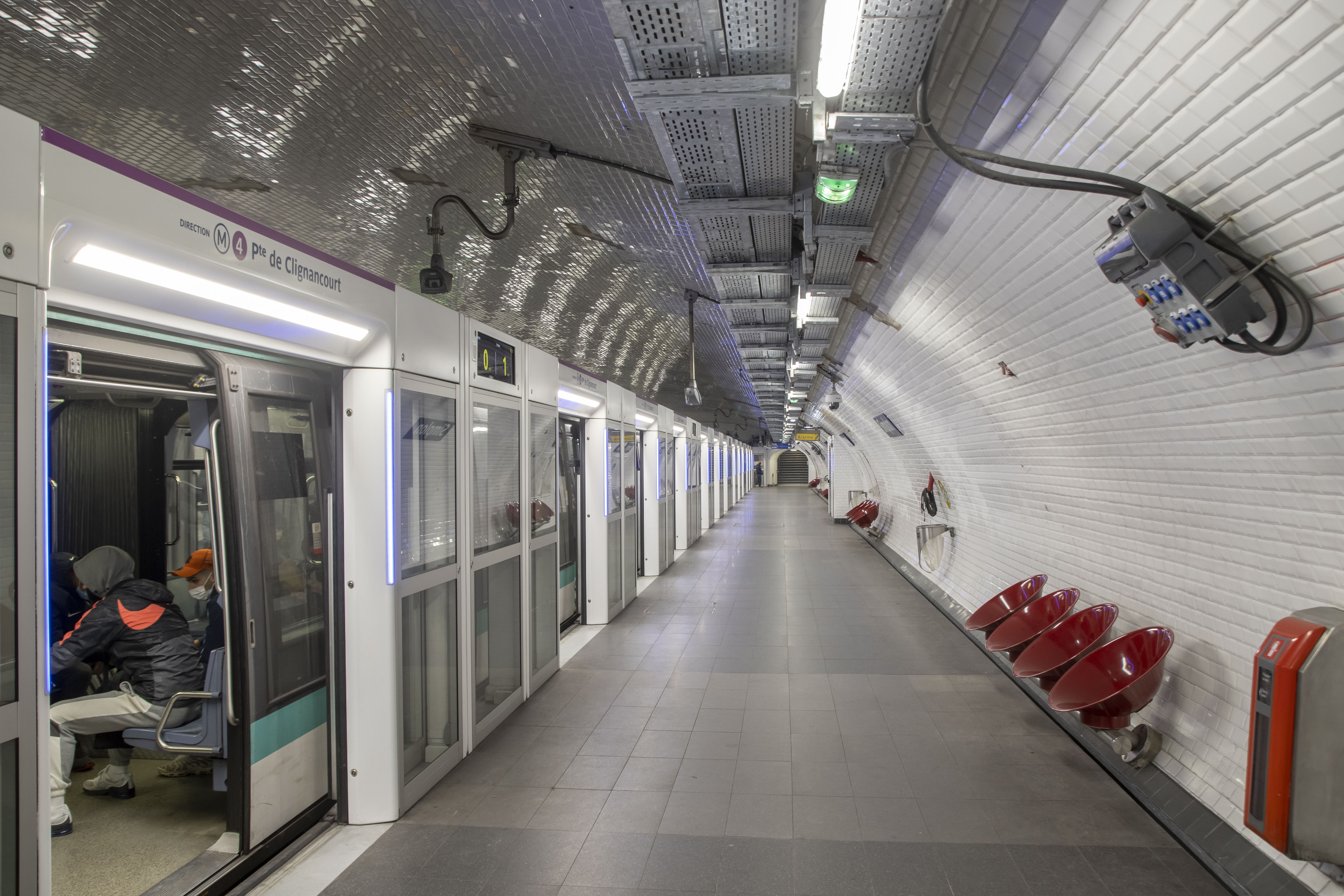
- Platform

General information
- Location: 27, boul. Ornano; 36, boul. Ornano; 38, boul. Ornano; 18th arrondissement of Paris; Île-de-France; France
- Coordinates: 48°53′36″N 2°20′54″E
- Owner: RATP
- Operator: RATP
- Line: Paris Metro Paris Metro Line 4
- Platforms: 2 (side platforms)
- Tracks: 2

Construction
- Accessible: no

Other information
- Fare zone: 1

History
- Opened: 21 April 1908; 118 years ago

Services
Preceding station	Paris Metro	Following station
Marcadet–Poissonniers towards Bagneux–Lucie Aubrac	Line 4	Porte de Clignancourt Terminus
Location
- Location within Paris

Simplon (French pronunciation: [sɛ̃plɔ̃]) is a station on Line 4 of the Paris Métro in the 18th arrondissement.

== History ==
The station was opened on 21 April 1908 as part of the first section of the line from Châtelet to Porte de Clignancourt. It takes its name from the Rue du Simplon, named after the Simplon Pass in the Lepontine Alps, location of one of the longest railroad tunnels in the world.

In 2018, according to estimates by the RATP, 2,756,818 travelers entered this station, which places it at the 205th position of the metro stations for its attendance.

=== Bombings of 1944 ===
During the night of 20 to 21 April 1944, the station was hit by an Allied aerial bombardment aimed at the Dépôt de La Chapelle, which caused the collapse of the roof onto the track and the platforms.

=== 2005 fire ===
On 6 August 2005, at 16:42, as a southbound MP 59 train heading to Porte d'Orleans, the then southern terminus of the line, was entering the station, the driver noticed smoke coming out from under the fifth car of a northbound train at the other platform, heading to Porte de Clignancourt. He alerted the controllers of the line, leading to the traction current being cut out and an evacuation being ordered (because of the risk of the fire spreading to other cars, as well as to the other train, now parallel to the fire).

A few minutes later, however, the fire reached the fifth car and spread to the second train. Firefighters, who arrived on the scene very quickly, started to extinguish the fire, which they described as very impressive. The fire was under control around 18:00. It was the combination of a malfunction of the JH electromechanical starting equipment, leading to a blockage of a traction element in the "maximum acceleration" position, as well as a latent failure of a circuit breaker. The rapid rotation of the wheel while the train was stationary caused the tire to overheat, burst, and trigger a fire. The fire revealed an insufficient level of smoke clearance on this portion of the line.

As a result of the fire, the smoke and difficulties in effectively clearing the station lead to suspension of traffic on line 4 between Porte de Clignancourt and Réaumur-Sébastopol, evacuation of the Marcadet – Poissonniers station and, because of the connection, suspension of traffic on line 12 between Trinité – d'Estienne d'Orves and the northern terminus at Porte de la Chapelle between 17:18 and 20:59. 19 people were slightly intoxicated by the smoke (one traveler and 18 RATP agents). The burnt trains were towed to the workshops at Saint-Ouen. Traffic resumed on the whole of Line 4 the next morning at 8am, however Simplon station was not served as it was closed for refurbishment, which was completed in February 2006, at which point the station resumed operation.

== Passenger services ==
=== Access ===
The station has three accesses that lead to Nos. 27, 36 and 38 of Boulevard Ornano.

=== Station layout ===
Street Level

B1	Mezzanine for platform connection

Line 4 platform level	Side platform, with PSDs doors will open on the right
Line 4 platform level	Northbound	← toward Porte de Clignancourt (Terminus)
Line 4 platform level	Southbound	→ toward Bagneux–Lucie Aubrac (Marcadet – Poissonniers)
Line 4 platform level	Side platform, with PSDs doors will open on the right

=== Platforms ===
The station has two side platforms to accommodate trains with a length of about 90 meters.

=== Bus connections ===
The station is served by Lines 56 and 85 of the RATP Bus Network and, at night, by Lines N14 and N44 of the Noctilien network.

== Nearby ==
Nearby attractions include the Square Maurice Kriegel-Valrimont and the Conservatoire Gustave Charpentier.
