= Château Rouge station =

Metro station in Paris, France

Château Rouge
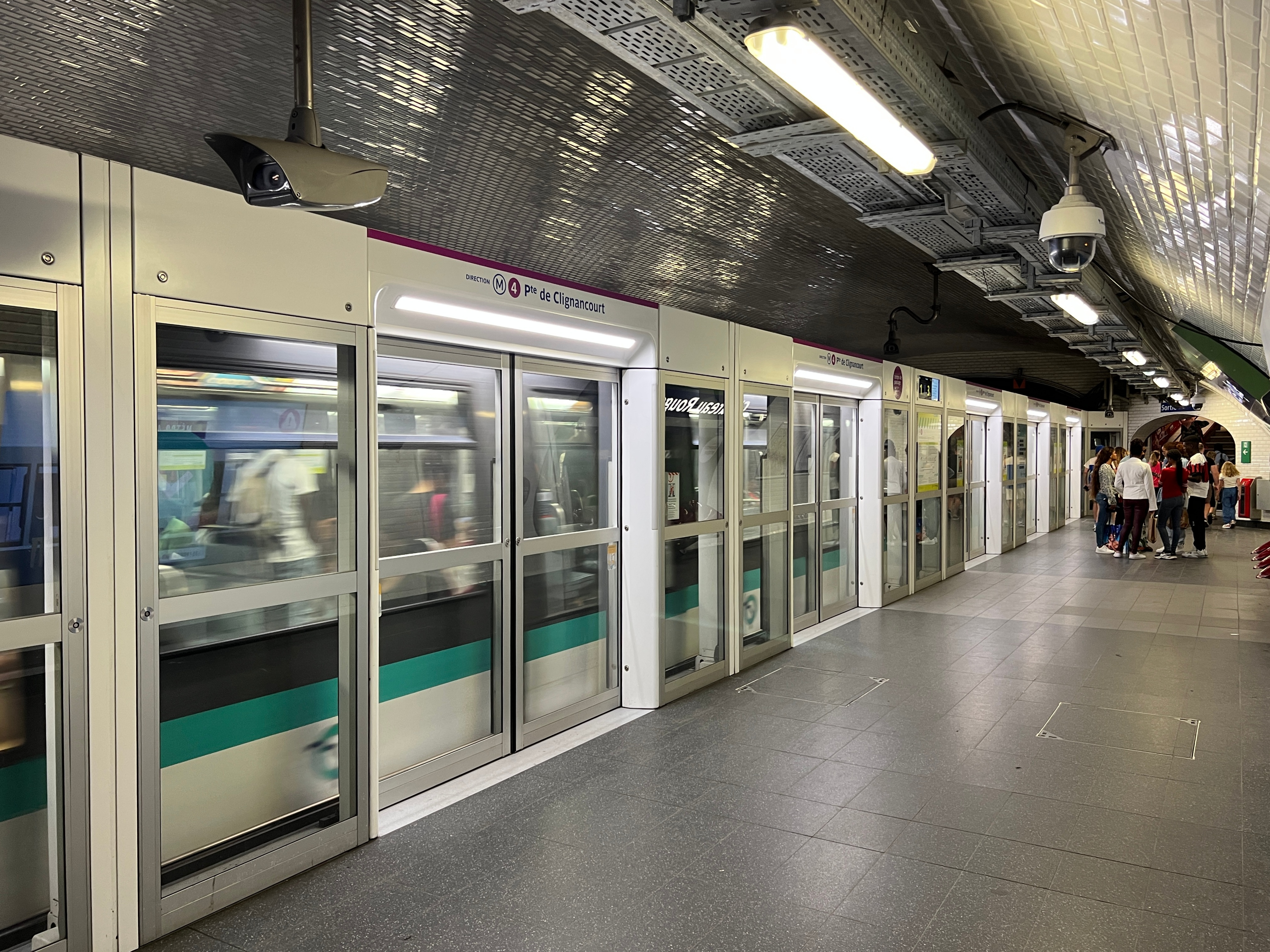
- Platforms

General information
- Location: 42, boul. Barbès; 48, pl. du Château Rouge; 18th arrondissement of Paris; Île-de-France; France
- Coordinates: 48°53′12″N 2°20′58″E
- Owner: RATP
- Operator: RATP

Other information
- Fare zone: 1

History
- Opened: 21 April 1908; 118 years ago

Services
Preceding station	Paris Metro	Following station
Barbès–Rochechouart towards Bagneux–Lucie Aubrac	Line 4	Marcadet–Poissonniers towards Porte de Clignancourt
Location
- Location within Paris

Château Rouge (French pronunciation: [ʃɑto ʁuʒ]; lit. 'Red Castle') is a station on Line 4 of the Paris Métro in the 18th arrondissement.

The station opened on 21 April 1908 as part of the first section of the line from Châtelet to Porte de Clignancourt. It is named for the Place du Château Rouge, itself named for a handsome residence of red bricks built nearby in 1760 but demolished in 1875. The nearby Goutte d'Or district is a vibrant, multicultural area and Rue Dejean street market operates every day except Monday.

== Crime ==
Since the late 2000s the area is known for pickpocketing and trade of stolen goods, especially mobile phones picked from unaware tourists around Sacré-Cœur and Barbès.

On 20 July 2021, six people were injured after a woman stuck her shopping trolley in the escalator at the station.

== Station layout ==
Street Level

B1	Mezzanine for platform connection

Line 4 platform level	Side platform with PSDs doors will open on the right
Line 4 platform level	Northbound	← toward Porte de Clignancourt (Marcadet – Poissonniers)
Line 4 platform level	Southbound	toward Bagneux–Lucie Aubrac (Barbès – Rochechouart) →
Line 4 platform level	Side platform with PSDs doors will open on the right
