= Lamarck–Caulaincourt station =

Metro station in Paris, France

Lamarck–Caulaincourt
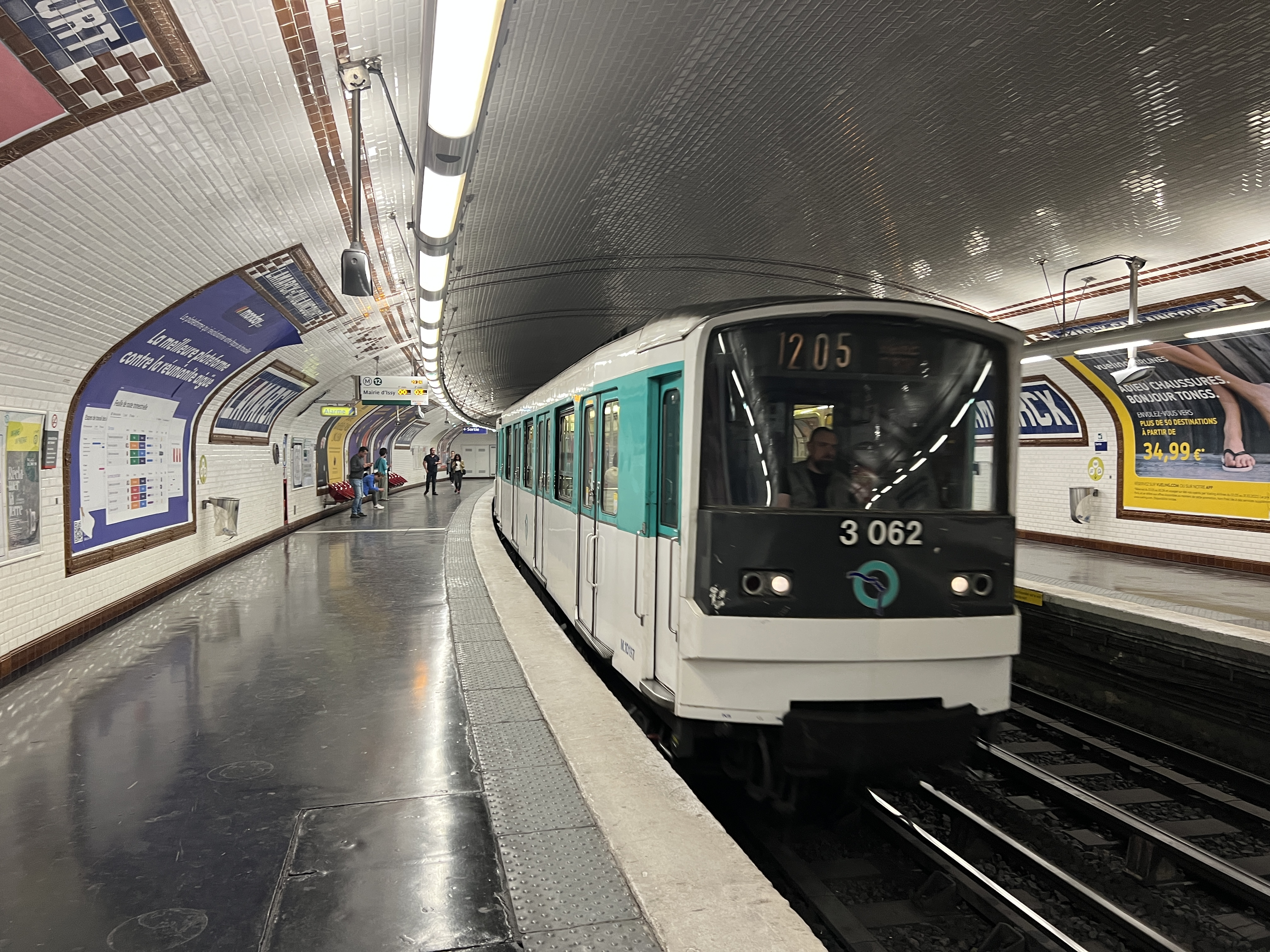

General information
- Location: 18th arrondissement of Paris; Île-de-France; France
- Coordinates: 48°53′21″N 2°20′17″E
- System: Paris Métro station
- Owner: RATP
- Operator: RATP

Other information
- Fare zone: 1

History
- Opened: 31 October 1912

Services
Preceding station	Paris Metro	Following station
Abbesses towards Mairie d'Issy	Line 12	Jules Joffrin towards Mairie d'Aubervilliers
Location
- Location within Paris

Lamarck–Caulaincourt (French pronunciation: [lamaʁk kolɛ̃kuʁ]) is a station on Line 12 of the Paris Métro in the Montmartre district and the 18th arrondissement of Paris.

== Location ==
Lamarck–Caulaincourt is located within the 18th arrondissement of Paris, which covers some of the northernmost parts of the city. Specifically, it runs beneath Rue de la Fontaine du But where it changes into a staircase. The station takes its name from the two main roads that cross near its entrance: Rue Lamarck and Rue Caulaincourt.

== History ==
The station opened on 31 October 1912 as part of a northward extension of the Nord-Sud company's Line A from Pigalle to Jules Joffrin. In 1930, the Compagnie du chemin de fer métropolitain de Paris bought out the Nord-Sud company and renamed Line A to Line 12 in order to conform to the former's convention.

Originally named Constantin Pecqueur, after the short street at the top of the entrance stairway, which in turn derives its title from the socialist economist of the same name, Lamarck–Caulaincourt opened as Lamarck, a reference to Rue Lamarck, the road at the bottom of the entrance stairwell. At a later time, the station's name changed to Lamarck (Caulaincourt), and finally received the spelling of Lamarck–Caulaincourt. Rue Lamarck is dedicated to Jean-Baptiste Pierre de Monet, Chevalier de Lamarck (1744–1829), a French naturalist who is mainly remembered for his theory of the inheritance of acquired traits. Rue Caulaincourt is named after the marquis Armand Augustin Louis de Caulaincourt (1773–1827), general, ambassador, and foreign minister from 1813 to 1814.

== Station layout ==
Street Level

B1	Mezzanine

Line 12 platforms	Side platform, doors will open on the right
Line 12 platforms	Southbound	← toward Mairie d'Issy (Abbesses)
Line 12 platforms	Northbound	toward Mairie d'Aubervilliers (Jules Joffrin) →
Line 12 platforms	Side platform, doors will open on the right

=== Design ===
The station has a very picturesque single entry which is surrounded by two staircases ascending the hill of Montmartre. The platforms are 25 m (82 ft) below the entrance and are reached by a lift or a spiral staircase. Like most Paris Métro stations, at track level, there are two tracks and two side platforms.

== In popular culture ==
Métro Lamarck–Caulaincourt features in the film Amélie, as the beautiful Metro station with the double staircase. It is where the blind man experiences a moment of transcendence as Amélie describes the mouthwatering sights of the bustling market on rue Lamarck.
