= Porte de la Chapelle station =

Metro station in Paris, France

Porte de la Chapelle
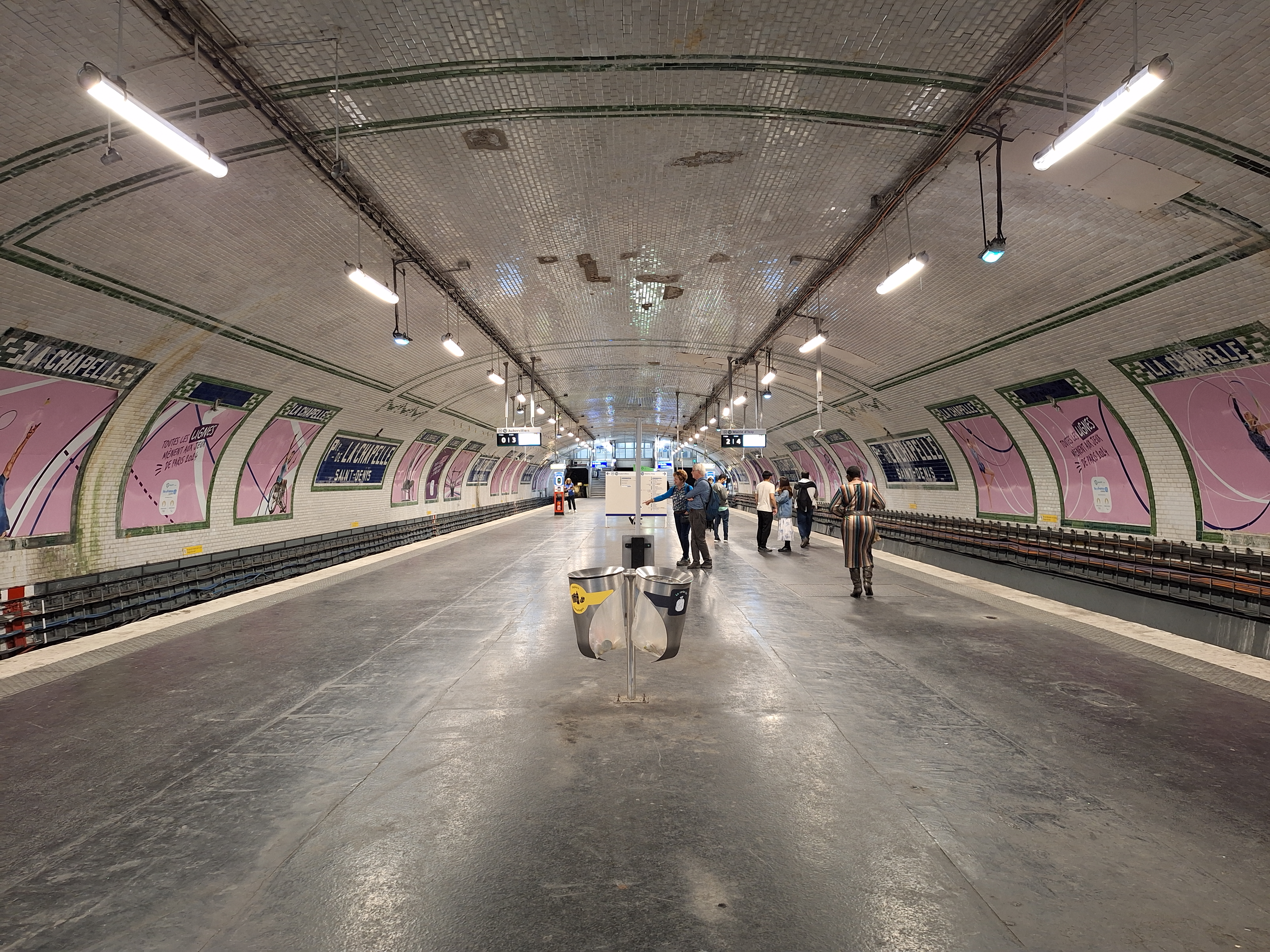
- the station in 2025, after the line's extension to Aubervilliers

General information
- Location: 18th arrondissement of Paris; Île-de-France; France
- Coordinates: 48°53′50″N 2°21′33″E
- System: Paris Métro station
- Owner: RATP
- Operator: RATP

Other information
- Fare zone: 1

History
- Opened: 23 August 1916

Services
Preceding station	Paris Metro	Following station
Marx Dormoy towards Mairie d'Issy	Line 12	Front Populaire towards Mairie d'Aubervilliers
Location
- Location within Paris

Porte de la Chapelle (French pronunciation: [pɔʁt də la ʃapɛl]) is a station on line 12 of the Paris Métro in the districts of La Chapelle and Goutte d'Or and the 18th arrondissement.

The station opened on 23 August 1916 as part of the extension of the Nord-Sud company's line A from Jules Joffrin. On 27 March 1931 line A became line 12 of the Métro.

Porte de la Chapelle was the terminus of line 12 from 1916 until 18 December 2012, when an extension opened to Front Populaire.

The station is named after the Porte de la Chapelle, a gate in the nineteenth century Thiers wall of Paris, on the Rue de la Chapelle, the old Roman road to Calais via Saint-Denis, now Route nationale 1. It was named after a village that was annexed by Paris in 1860 and was named after a chapel to Saint Genevieve built in the 6th century.

The station is featured in "Crossroads", an episode of the American HBO series "Band of Brothers".

A street-level interchange with Paris tramway Line 3b opened on 15 December 2012.

It is proposed to extend line 12 further north through from Aubervilliers' town hall to La Courneuve–Aubervilliers RER B station then La Courneuve 6 Routes Tramway line 1 station, for interconnection with Grand Paris Express' lines 16 and 17. Despite the tracks having been laid all to way to La Courneuve's train station during the extension to Mairie d'Aubervilliers, no platforms have been built at the train station.

In 2025, Porte de la Chapelle has lost its central track, and the two initial island platforms were merged into one following the line's northern extension to Aubervilliers. The siding track northeast from the station, has also been decommissioned, leaving only the revision track northwest intact.

== Station layout ==
Street Level

B1	Mezzanine

Line 12 platforms	Southbound	← toward Mairie d'Issy (Marx Dormoy)
Line 12 platforms	Island platform
Line 12 platforms	Northbound	toward Mairie d'Aubervilliers (Front Populaire) →

== Gallery ==
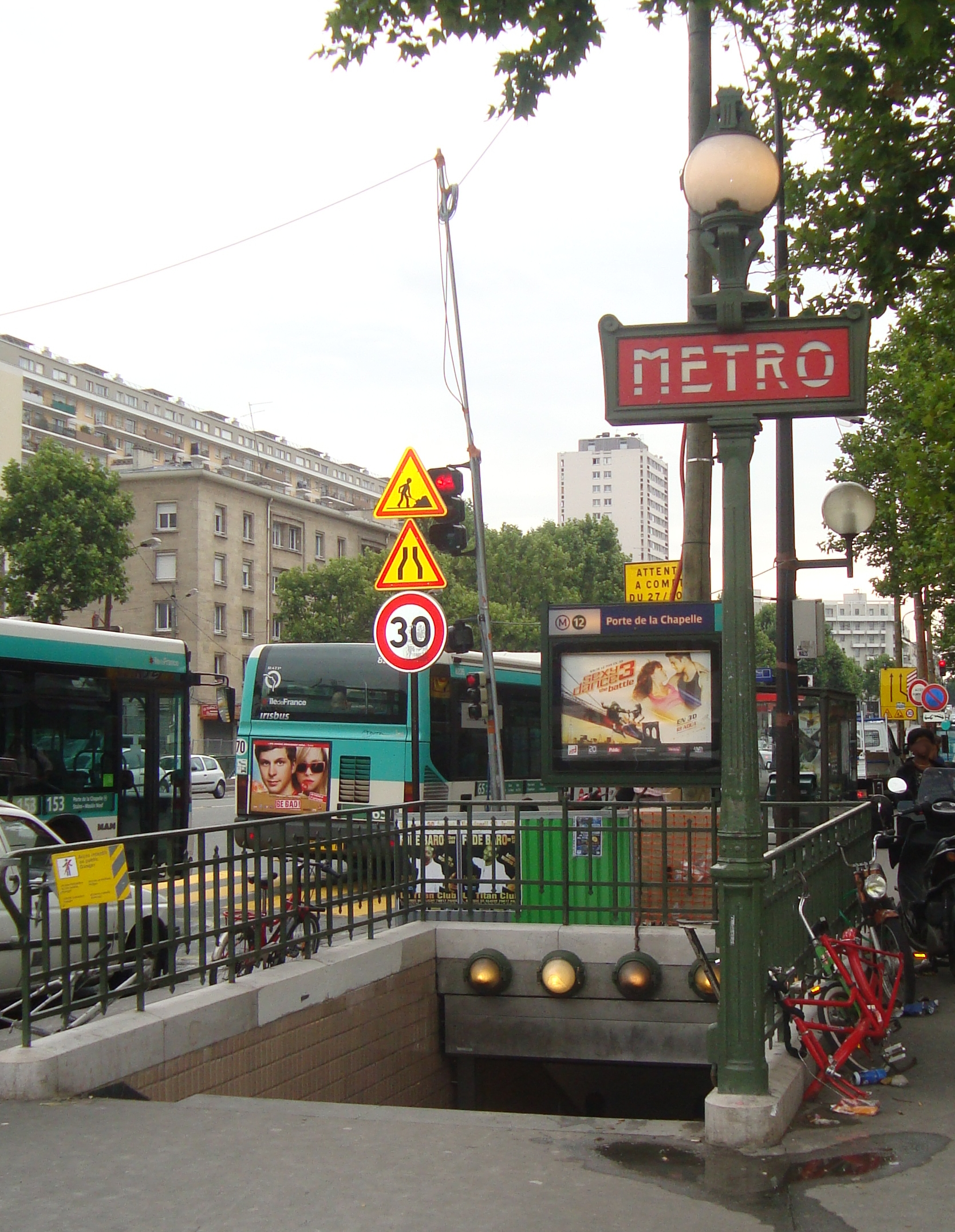
Street-level entrance at Porte de la Chapelle

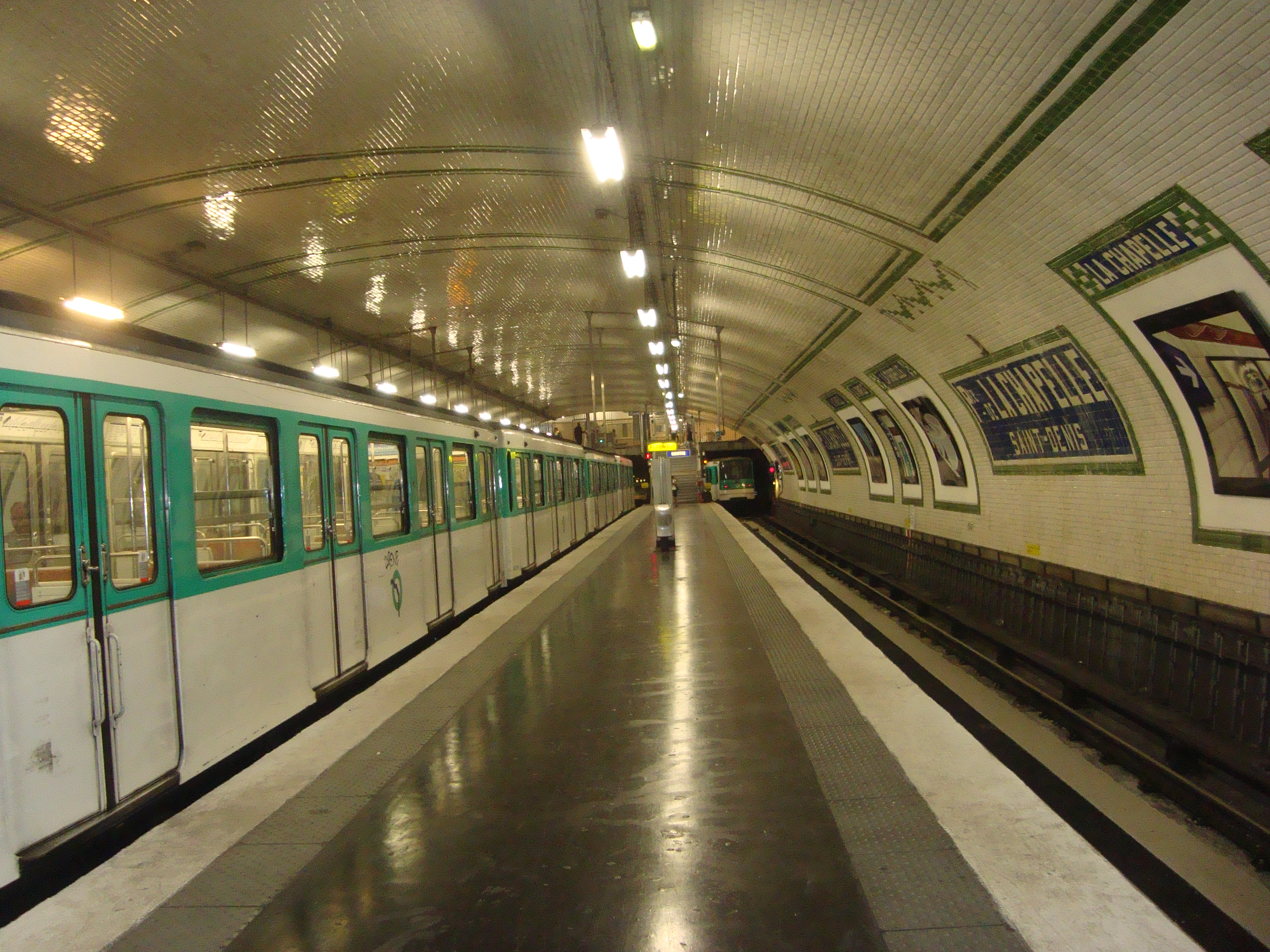
MF 67 at Porte de la Chapelle's now removed central track.
