= Marx Dormoy =

French politician (1888–1941)

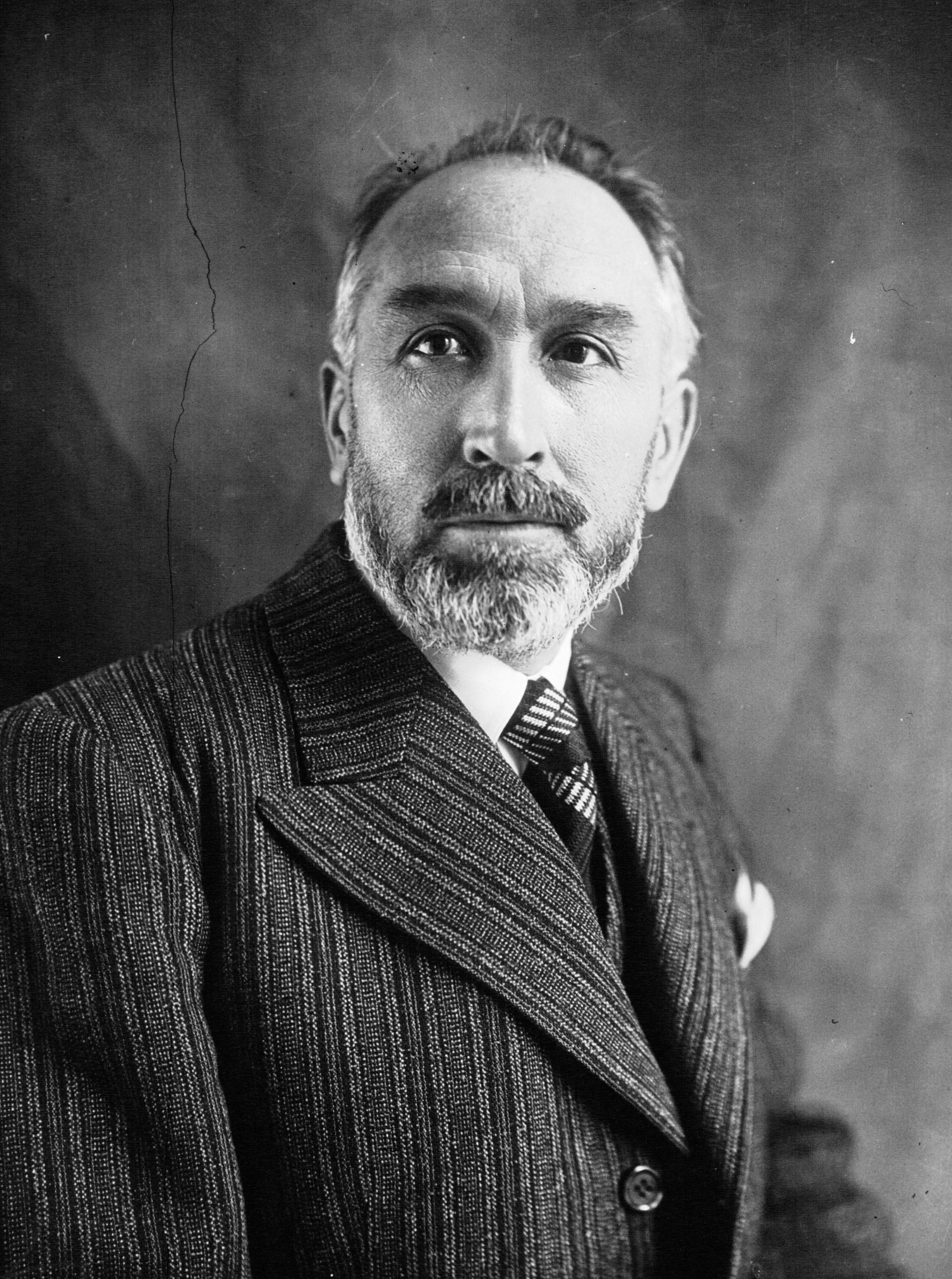
- Dormoy in 1932

Minister of Interior
- In office November 24, 1936 – January 18, 1938
- Prime Minister: Léon Blum; Camille Chautemps
- Preceded by: Roger Salengro
- Succeeded by: Albert Sarraut
- In office 13 March – 10 April 1938
- Prime Minister: Léon Blum
- Preceded by: Albert Sarraut
- Succeeded by: Albert Sarraut

Personal details
- Born: René Marx Dormoy; 1 August 1888 Montluçon, in Allier, France
- Died: 26 July 1941 (aged 52) Montélimar, France
- Party: SFIO
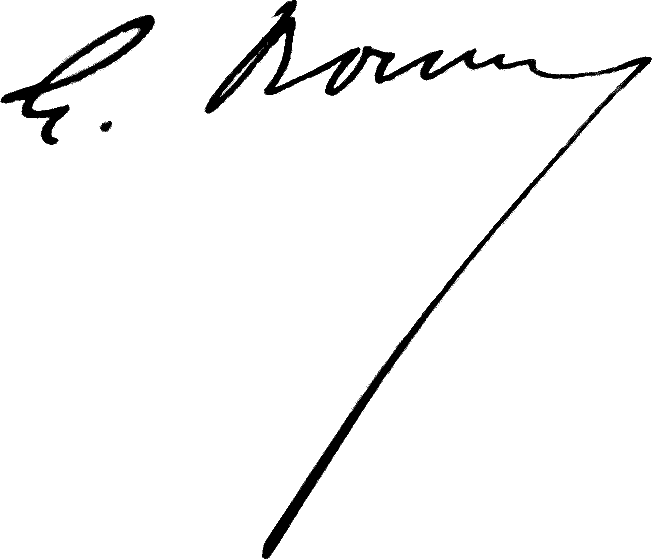
- Signature

René Marx Dormoy (French pronunciation: [ʁəne maʁks dɔʁmwa], 1 August 1888 – 26 July 1941) was a French socialist politician, noted for his opposition to the far right. Under his leadership as Minister of the Interior in the government of Léon Blum, the French police infiltrated La Cagoule, which was in the successful process of destablising the Popular Front government, reaching a settlement with Nazi Germany and ending the French Third Republic. Dormoy directed the arrest and imprisonment of 70 cagoulards in November 1937. The police seized 2 tons of armaments from their sites.

After the Occupation of France, Dormoy as a representative refused to back full powers to Marshal Philippe Pétain and the Vichy government. He was arrested in 1940 and interned in house arrest in Montélimar. He was assassinated there in July 1941 by detonation of a bomb. It was believed to be the work of La Cagoule-Vichyist terrorists.

== Biography ==
=== Early career ===
He was born in Montluçon, in Allier as the youngest son of Jean Dormoy, a shoemaker and activist of the French Workers' Party, who later became the first socialist mayor of Montluçon. René Marx Dormoy (called Marx after Karl Marx) attended local schools and became active in politics. He was elected mayor of his native town in 1926. He was elected in 1931 as representative of the Section française de l'Internationale ouvrière (SFIO) to the French National Assembly from the Allier département.

=== Popular Front ===
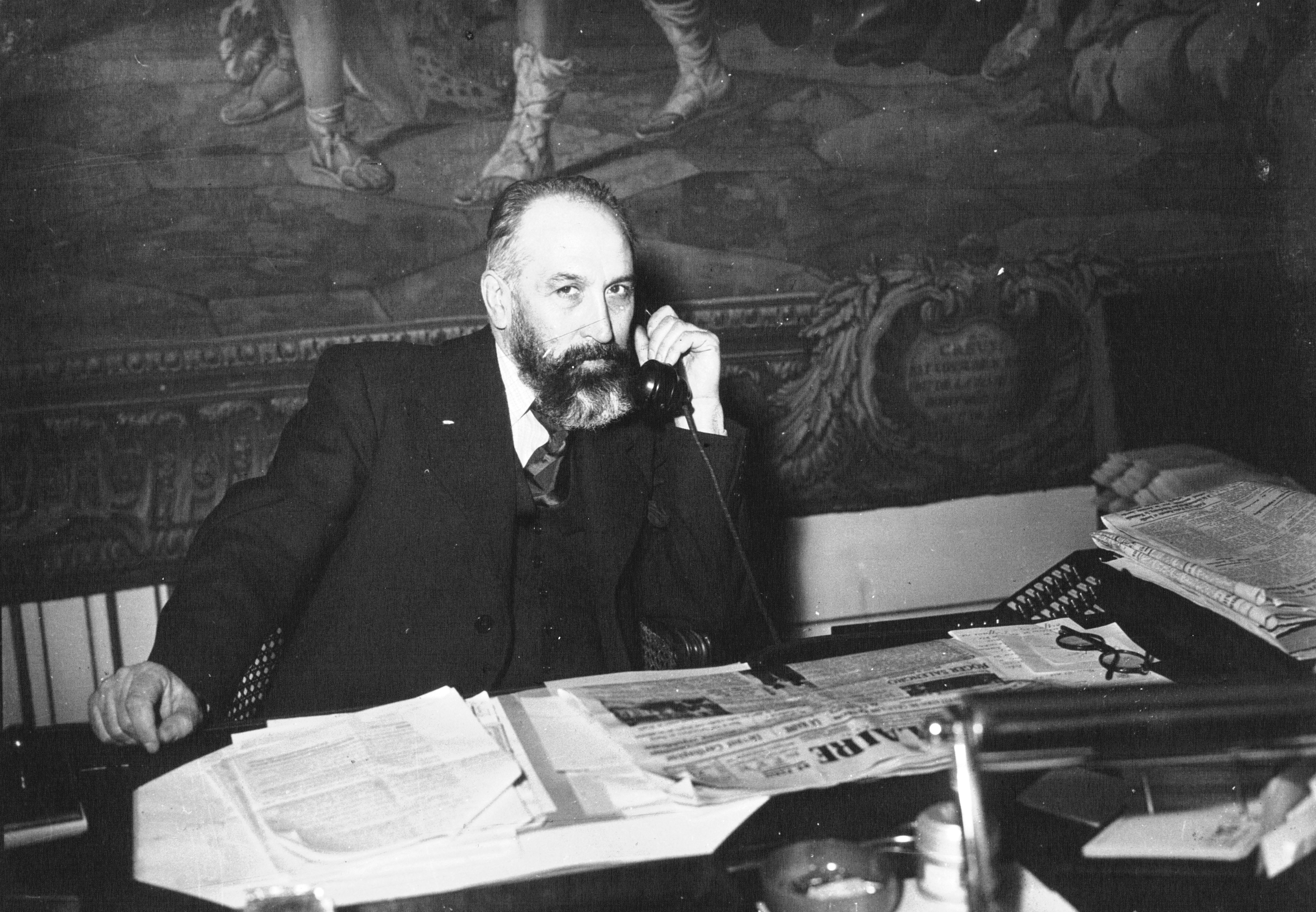
Marx Dormoy at his office in 1936

A member of the Popular Front's government, cabinet secretary to Léon Blum, he played a part in negotiating the Matignon Accords. From 1936 to 1938 he was Minister of the Interior (replacing Roger Salengro). He worked to suppress violent far right groups such as the Cagoule. He used his authority to depose Jacques Doriot, mayor of Saint-Denis, arguing that the Saint-Denis commune had become the site of anti-republican agitation. He opposed illegal immigration of Eastern European political refugees to France.

On 16 March 1937, Dormoy provoked a crisis inside the Popular Front. The French Police opened fire on a crowd protesting against a Croix-de-Feu rally in Clichy, after the event had degenerated into disorder. Dormoy was subsequently attacked by Trotskyist groups and by Maurice Thorez, the leader of the French Communist Party, who held him responsible for the casualties, as Dormoy had initially authorised the Croix-de-Feu to march in the city. Dormoy was backed by Léon Blum, and a motion of confidence was passed in the Parliament on 23 March.

In November 1937, Dormoy ordered the arrest of 70 members of La Cagoule after the police infiltrated the far-right organization. It had been planning the violent overthrow of the government that month and the installation of a fascist government. The French police seized 2 tons of high explosives, several anti-tank or anti-aircraft guns, 500 machine guns, 65 submachine guns, 134 rifles and 17 sawed-off shotguns.

In 1938, as an SFIO senator for Allier, Dormoy spoke out against the Munich Agreement with Nazi Germany.

=== Imprisonment and death ===
Two years later, after the Fall of France, he was one of the minority of parliamentarians who refused to grant full powers to Marshal Philippe Pétain. Pétain's Vichy France regime had him suspended from his office as mayor on 20 September 1940, and arrested five days later. Dormoy was imprisoned in Pellevoisin, then in Vals-les-Bains, before being placed under house arrest in Montélimar.

He was killed in July 1941 by a bomb that exploded at his house; it was believed to have been placed by Cagoule terrorists. This was believed to be reprisal for his suppression of the group in 1937.

Marx Dormoy was given a solemn funeral in his birthplace of Montluçon.

== Legacy and honors ==
- A Métro station and street were named after him in the 18th arrondissement of Paris.
- An olympic swimming pool was named after him in Lille.
- Knight of the Order of Legion of Honour
- Resistance Medal
