= Jean-Baptiste Berlier =

French engineer (1841–1911)

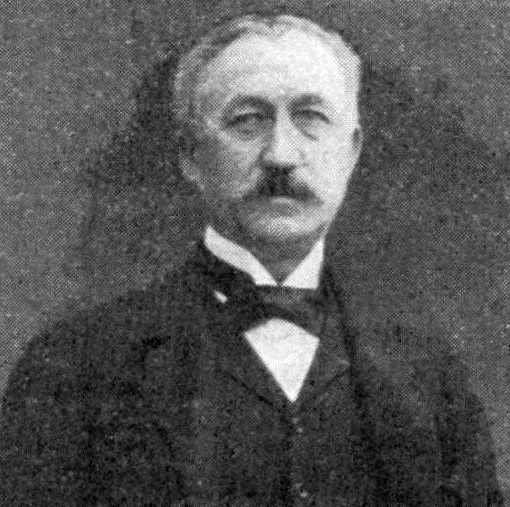

Jean-Baptiste Berlier (11 October 1843 – 9 September 1911) was a French engineer and inventor who was responsible for the pneumatic tube postal system of Paris, which operated until as late as 1984.

Berlier, who was born in Rive-de-Gier, Loire, was also the promoter of various ideas for a subterranean tramway which would have been built using similar tunneling technology as the "tube railways" of London. Though these were never realised, Berlier was heavily involved with the Paris Metro from its opening in 1900 and indeed was one of the key instigators of the Société du chemin de fer électrique souterrain Nord-Sud de Paris which went on to build two privately funded lines that were later absorbed by the Compagnie du chemin de fer métropolitain de Paris, and are still in use today as (parts of) Paris Métro Line 12 and Paris Métro Line 13.

Berlier died in Deauville. There is a Parisian street named after him in the 13th arrondissement, the Rue Jean-Baptiste-Berlier.
