= Jules Joffrin =

French politician and activist (1846–1890)

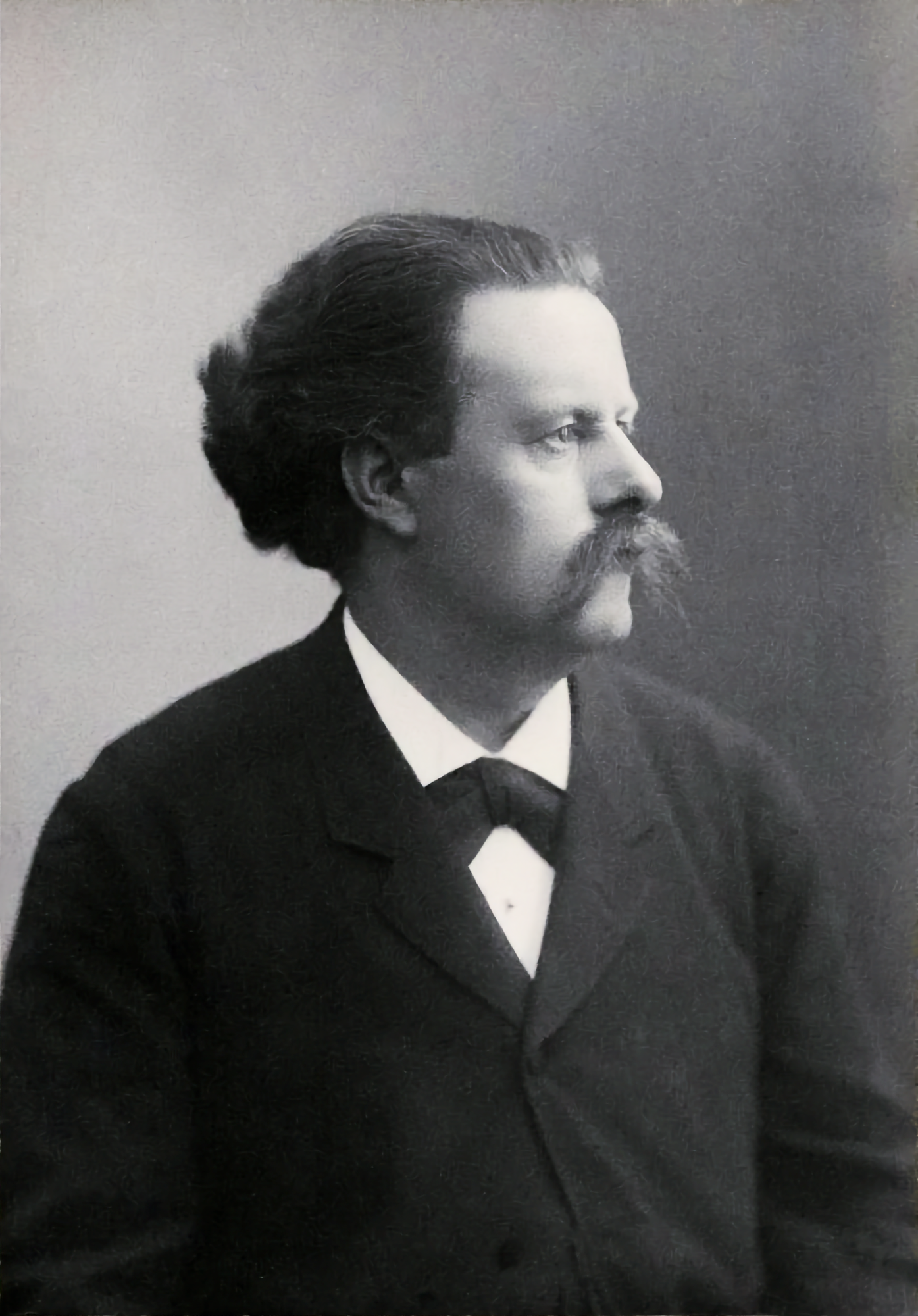
Joffrin in 1890

Jules François Alexandre Joffrin (French pronunciation: [ʒyl ʒɔfʁɛ̃]; 16 March 1846 – 17 September 1890) was a French socialist activist and politician who was involved in the Paris Commune and later elected to the Chamber of Deputies for Seine (1889–1890).

== Biography ==
Joffrin was born in Vendeuvre-sur-Barse near Troyes. A mechanic by trade, he served in the Franco-Prussian War, was involved in the Commune, and spent eleven years in England as a political exile. First affiliated to the French Workers' Party, he attached himself to the more measured, "possibilist" group within the socialist movement, with the newly-founded Revolutionary Socialist Workers' Party, opposed to the root-and-branch measures of Jules Guesde.

He became a member of the municipal council of Paris in 1882, and was vice-president in 1888–1889. He also served in the General Council of Seine for Grandes-Carrières in 1882–1884.

Violently attacked by the Boulangist organs, L'Intransigeant and La France, he won a suit against them for libel, and in 1889 he contested the 18th arrondissement of Paris with General Boulanger, who obtained a majority of over 2,000 votes, but was in exile in Belgium and had been declared ineligible. Joffrin was only admitted to the Chamber of Deputies after a heated discussion and a vote to recognise him as the winner, and continued to be attacked by the nationalists. He died in Paris in 1890 and was buried at Père Lachaise Cemetery.

== Namesake ==
A Paris Métro station, Jules Joffrin, is named in his honour. The station is located in Montmartre, near the town hall of the 18th arrondissement.
