= Goutte d'Or =

Administrative quarter in Paris, France

Coordinates: 48°53′14″N 2°21′12″E

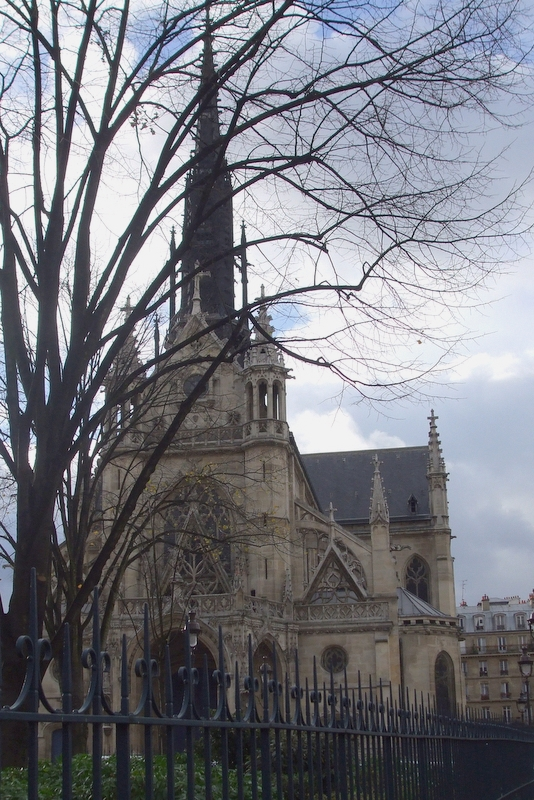
Church of Saint-Bernard de la Chapelle

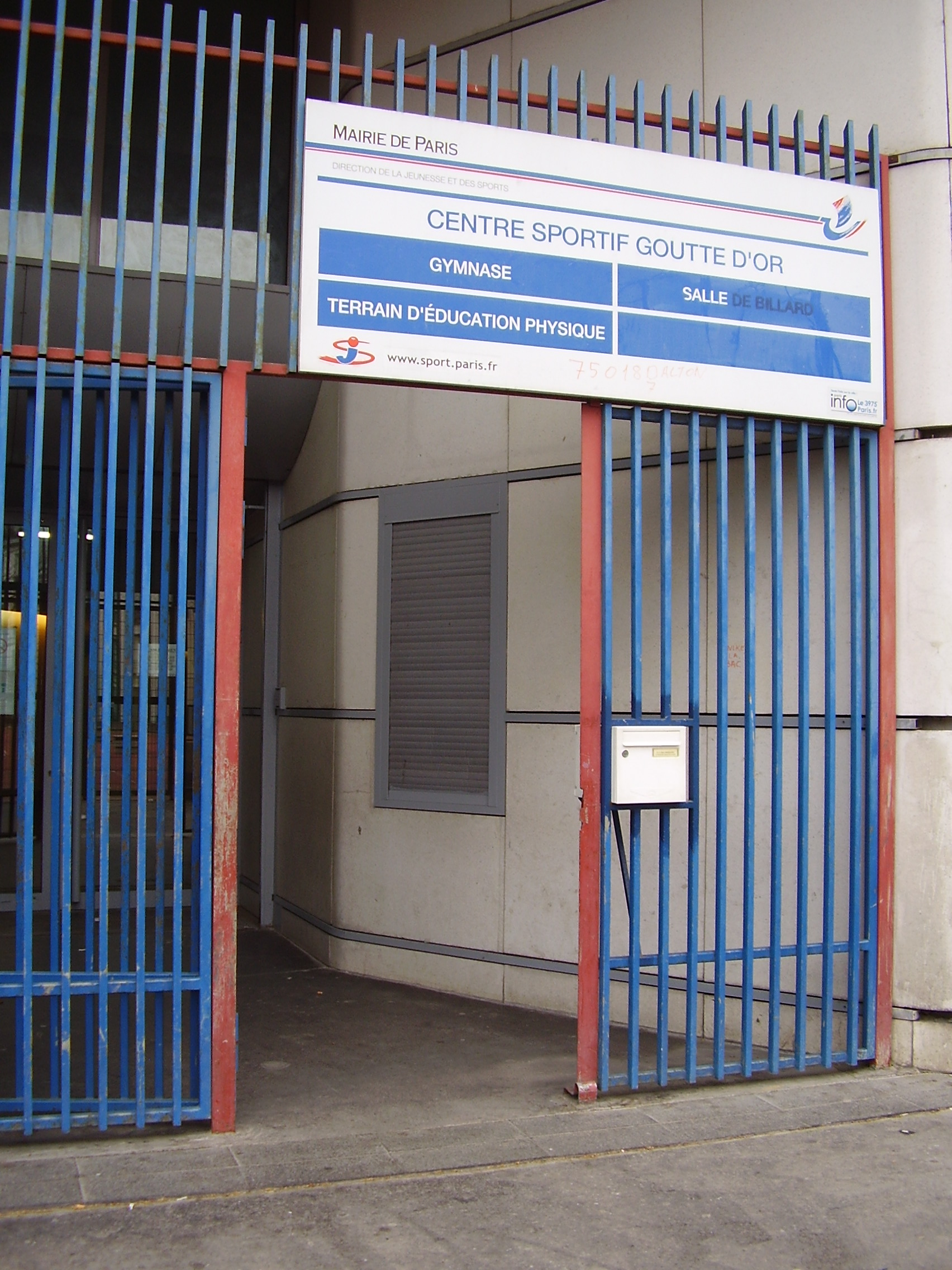
Goutte d'Or Sports Centre

The Goutte d'Or (French pronunciation: [ɡut dɔʁ], lit. 'Drop of Gold') is a neighbourhood in Paris, located in the 18th arrondissement of Paris.

The neighbourhood has large numbers of North African and sub-Saharan residents. It is known for its open-air market, le marché Dejean, which sells goods of African origin.

== Location ==
In common terms, the name 'Goutte d'Or' refers to a loosely defined area around the rue de la Goutte d'Or, to the east of Montmartre and to the west of La Chapelle in the 18th arrondissement of Paris. When used for administrative or statistical purposes, the Goutte d'Or may be defined in at least three different ways:

- The "Sensitive Urban Zone" (ZUS) of La Goutte d'Or is bounded to the south by Boulevard de la Chapelle, to the west by Boulevard Barbès, to the north by Rue Ordener, and to the east by Rue de Tombouctou and Rue Stephenson.
- The neighbourhood council (conseil de quartier) area of La Goutte d'Or – Château Rouge (as defined by the council of the 18th arrondissement) is bounded to the south by Boulevard de la Chapelle and Boulevard de Rochechouart, to the west by Rue de Clignancourt, to the north by Rue Ordener and to the east by the railway lines heading out of the Gare du Nord. This is very similar to the definition of the ZUS cited above, the main difference being that the neighbourhood council boundaries include the whole of the Château Rouge area, which straddles Boulevard Barbès and which is an important centre for the West African community in Paris and the surrounding Île-de-France region. Château Rouge is very closely linked to the Goutte d'Or and, depending on one's viewpoint, may be considered to be either a sub-neighbourhood of the Goutte d'Or or a separate, adjacent neighbourhood. In either case, there is no clear line that precisely defines the extent of Château Rouge.
- The "administrative neighbourhood" (quartier administratif) of La Goutte d'Or is substantially larger and continues further to the north, as far as the boundary between Paris and Saint-Denis. This administrative neighbourhood is bounded to the south by Boulevard de la Chapelle, to the west by Boulevard Barbès and Rue des Poissonniers (thus excluding the Château Rouge area), to the north by the Paris city boundary, and to the east by Avenue de la Porte de la Chapelle, Rue de la Chapelle and Rue Marx Dormoy. However, the area to the north of Rue Ordener is largely occupied by the railway lines heading out of the Gare du Nord and associated SNCF technical facilities.

== Demographics ==
This neighbourhood has been working-class since at least the nineteenth century. Émile Zola set the plot of his novel L'Assommoir there, depicting the life of alcoholic employees.

From the 1920s, the area witnessed a substantial influx of people moving there from Algeria (then a part of France). Naomi Davidson, the author of Only Muslim: Embodying Islam in Twentieth-Century France, wrote that Goutte d'Or in 1948 "appears to have had" 5,720 North Africans and that the estimates of North Africans in 1952 were 5,500-6,400; it had been perceived to have become North African in the post-World War II period. The Algerian population stabilised in the 1950s, while the populations from other European and African countries increased. Today, a large part of the population is either foreign, or of foreign descent. As of 2006, the INSEE estimated the proportion of foreign nationals at 34.6%.

As of 2012, at least 35% of the residents of Goutte d'Or were of immigrant origin, including West African and Algerian, a figure unchanged from 2006.

== Notable buildings ==
- Church of Saint-Bernard de la Chapelle
- Institut des cultures d'Islam (ICI), at 56 Rue Stephenson

== Shops ==
The neighbourhood hosts many African shops and an open-air market, the marché Dejean.

== Government and infrastructure ==
- The Pôle Santé Health Centre is located in Goutte d'Or.

== Education ==
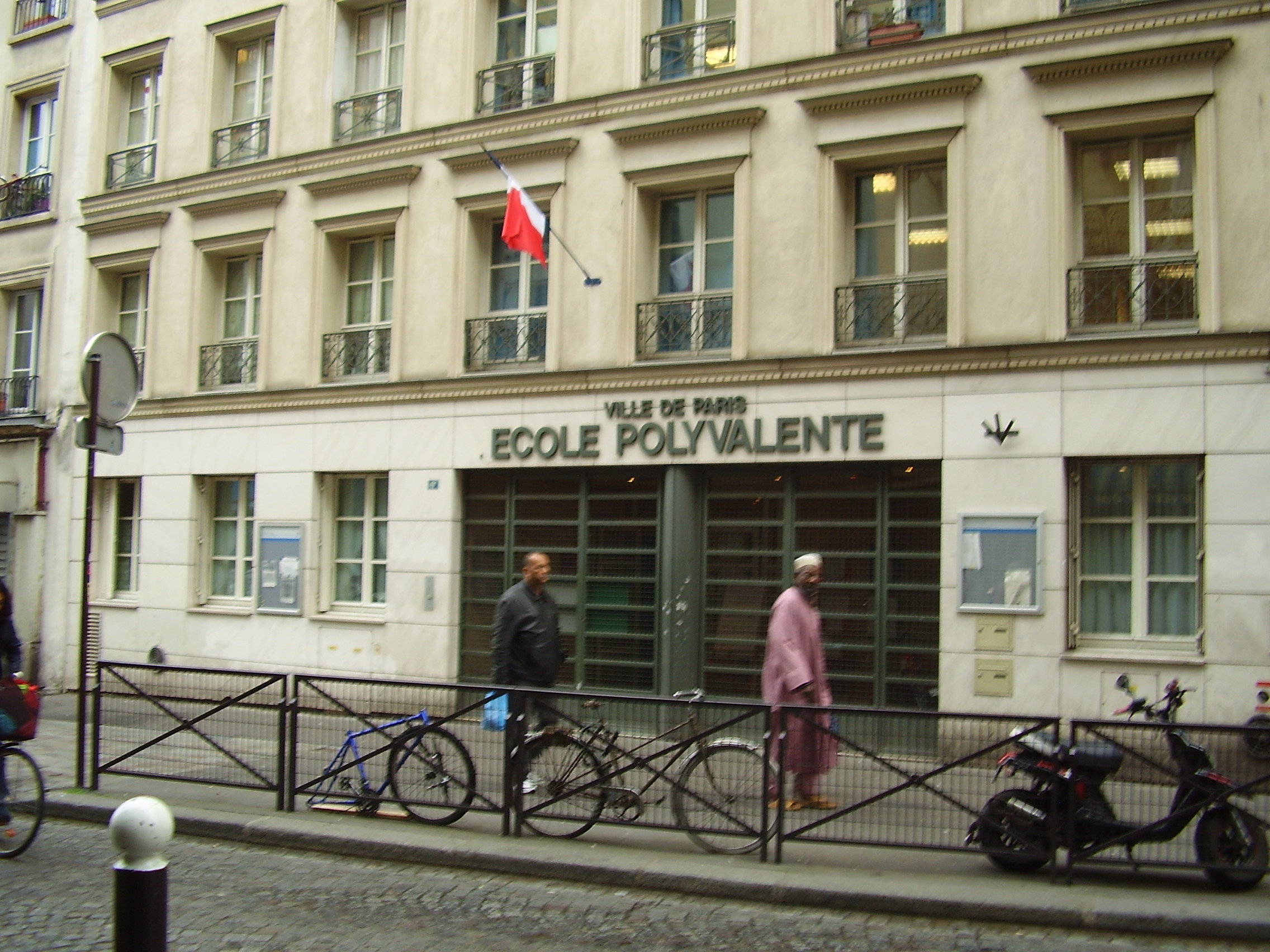
École Polyvalente de la Goutte d'Or

Goutte d'Or has four nursery schools (écoles maternelles), four primary schools (écoles élémentaires), two écoles polyvalentes, and one high school (collège).

The nursery schools include École Maternelle de la Goutte d'Or, École Maternelle Marcadet, École Maternelle Richomme, and École Maternelle Saint-Luc. The primary schools include École Élémentaire Pierre Budin, École Élémentaire Cavé, École élémentaire d'Oran, and École Élémentaire Richomme. The écoles polyvalentes include École Polyvalente de la Goutte d'Or and École Polyvalente Emile Duployé. The neighbourhood has Collège Georges Clemenceau, the junior high school in Goutte d'Or.

The Goutte d'Or Library (Bibliothèque Goutte d'Or) is located in the neighbourhood.

== See also ==
- Sub-Saharan African community of Paris
- Maghrebian community of Paris
- January 2016 Paris police station attack
- La Chapelle (Seine)
