= Jules Joffrin station =

Metro station in Paris, France

Jules Joffrin
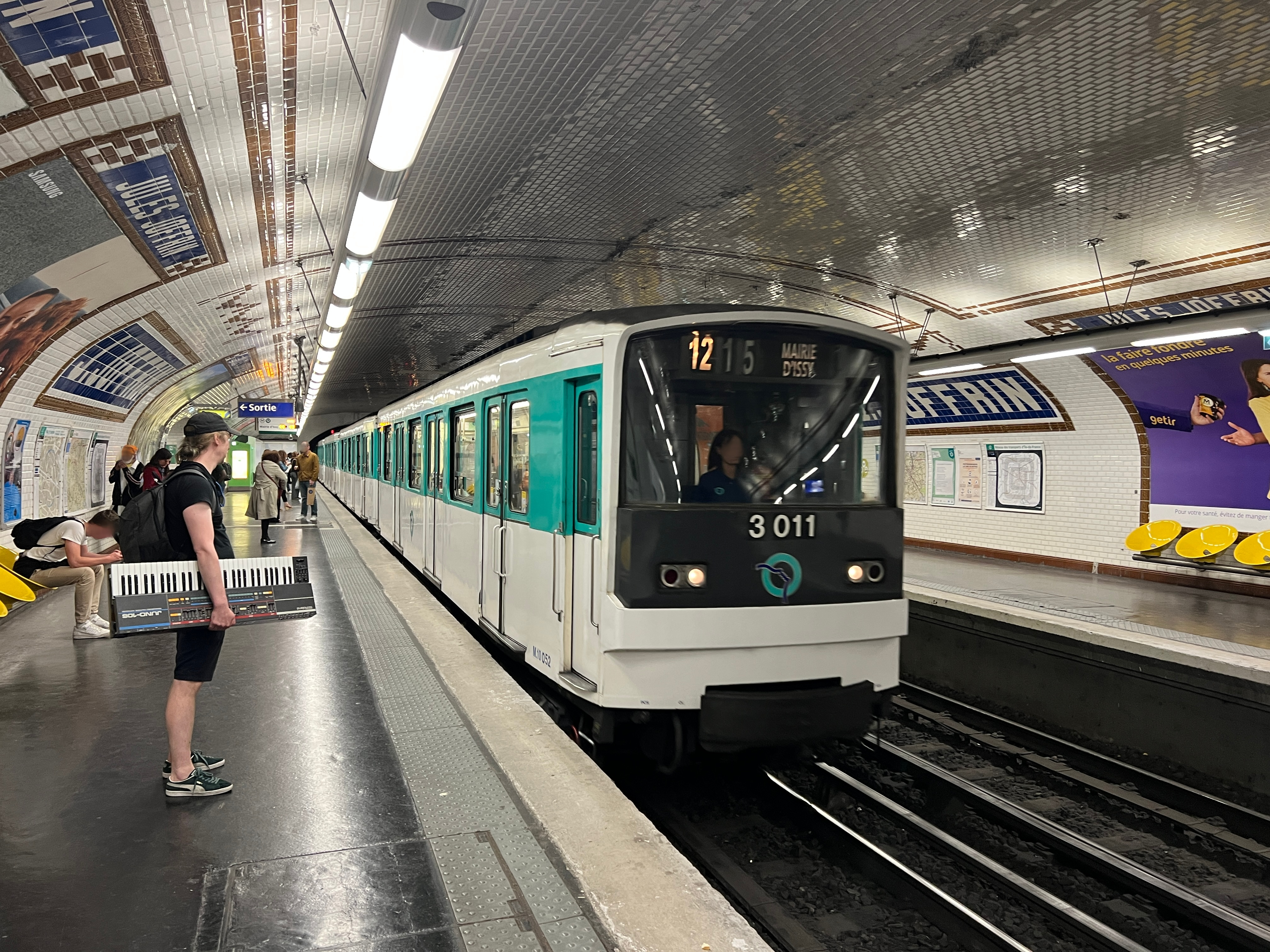

General information
- Location: 18th arrondissement of Paris; Île-de-France; France
- Coordinates: 48°53′33″N 2°20′41″E
- System: Paris Métro station
- Owner: RATP
- Operator: RATP

Other information
- Fare zone: 1

History
- Opened: 31 October 1912

Services
Preceding station	Paris Metro	Following station
Lamarck–Caulaincourt towards Mairie d'Issy	Line 12	Marcadet–Poissonniers towards Mairie d'Aubervilliers
Location
- Location within Paris

Jules Joffrin (French pronunciation: [ʒyl ʒɔfʁɛ̃]) is a station on Line 12 of the Paris Métro in the Clignancourt district and the 18th arrondissement. It is located in Montmartre, between the town hall of the 18th arrondissement and the Notre-Dame de Clignancourt church.

The station opened on 31 October 1912 as part of the extension of the Nord-Sud company's line A from Pigalle. It was the northern terminus of the line until 23 August 1916 when it was extended to Porte de la Chapelle. On 27 March 1931 line A became line 12 of the Métro. The station was named after Jules François Alexandre Joffrin (1846–1890) who was a councillor of the 18th arrondissement and a député.

== Station layout ==
Street Level

B1	Mezzanine

Line 12 platforms	Side platform, doors will open on the right
Line 12 platforms	Southbound	← toward Mairie d'Issy (Lamarck – Caulaincourt)
Line 12 platforms	Northbound	toward Mairie d'Aubervilliers (Marcadet – Poissonniers) →
Line 12 platforms	Side platform, doors will open on the right

== Gallery ==
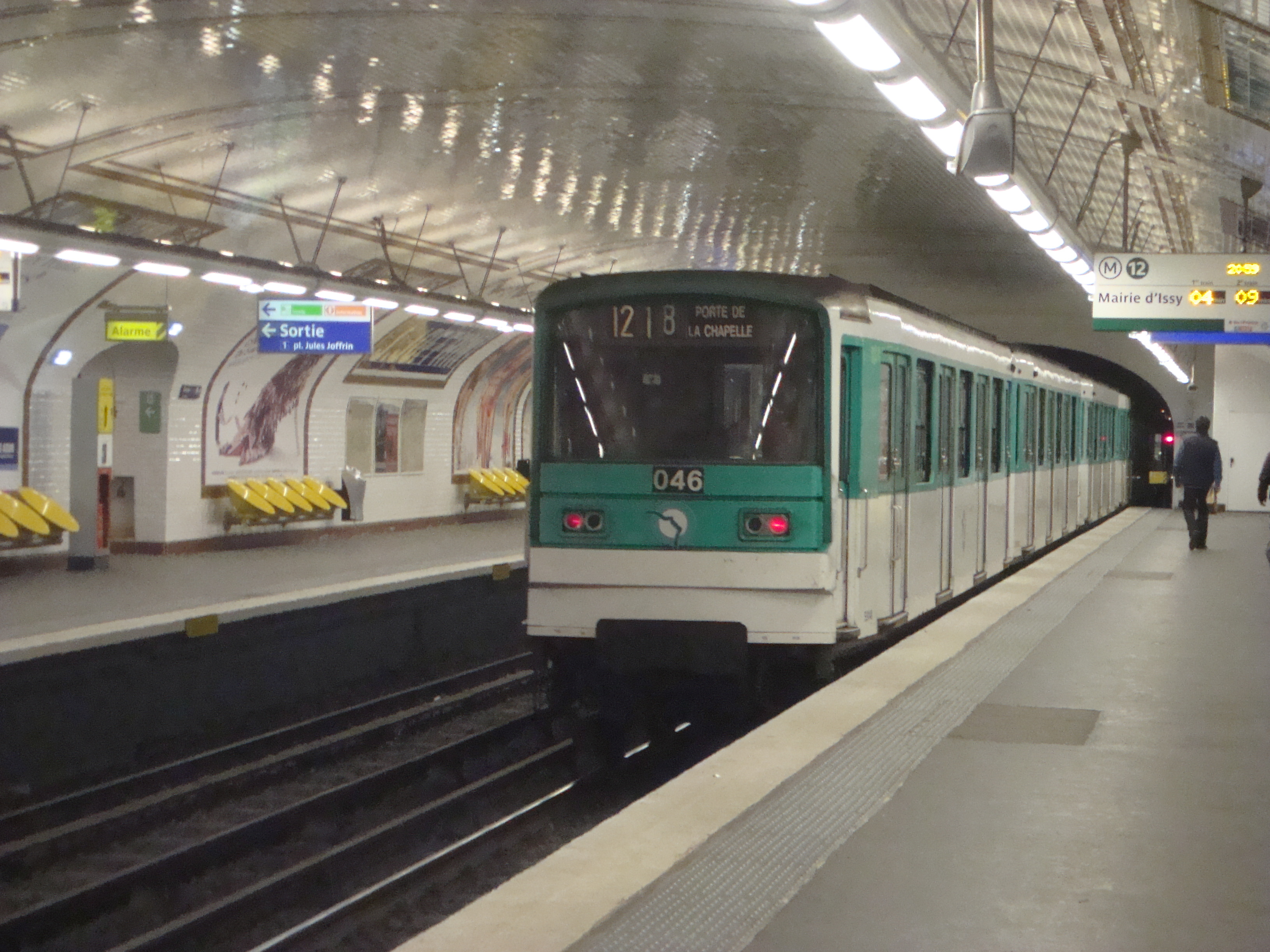
MF 67 rolling stock on Line 12 at Jules Joffrin
