= Nord-Sud Company =

French rapid transit company

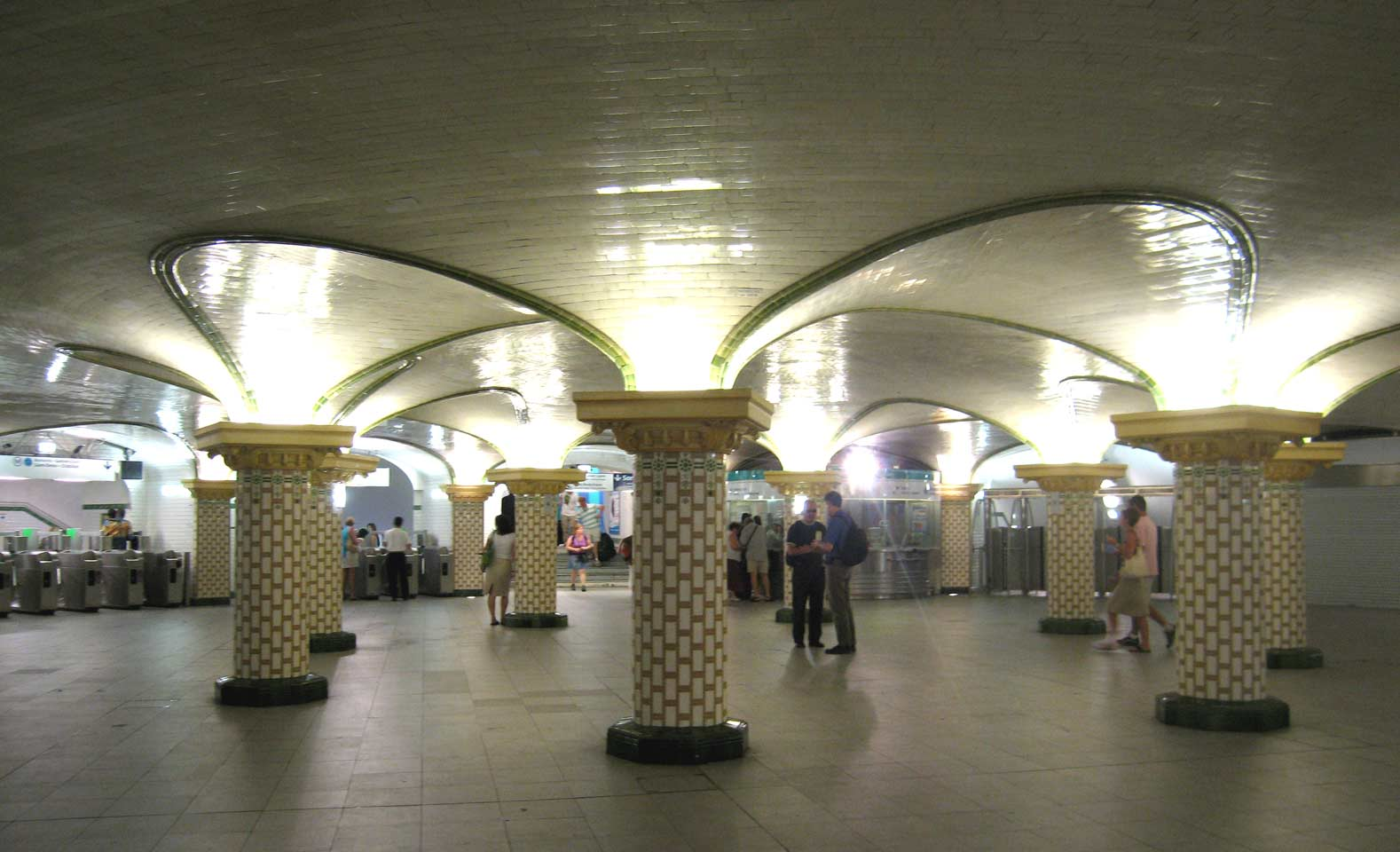
Rotunda of Saint-Lazare station created by the Nord-Sud Company

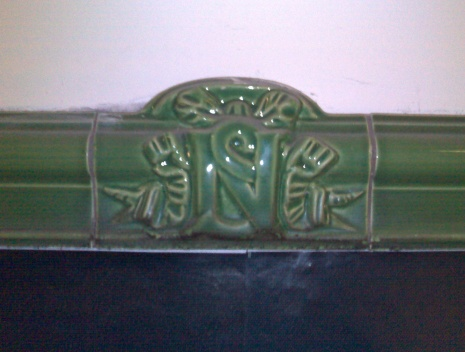
Typical Nord-Sud tile, on the former Line A (today's Line 12).

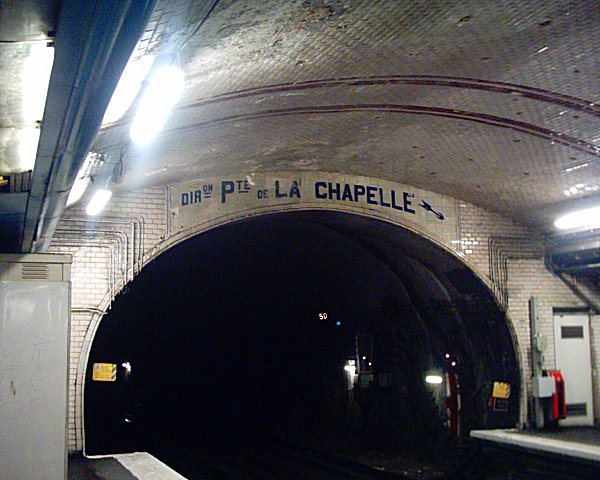
Typical Nord-Sud decorations, with colourful tiles and an indication of the destination at the end of the station.

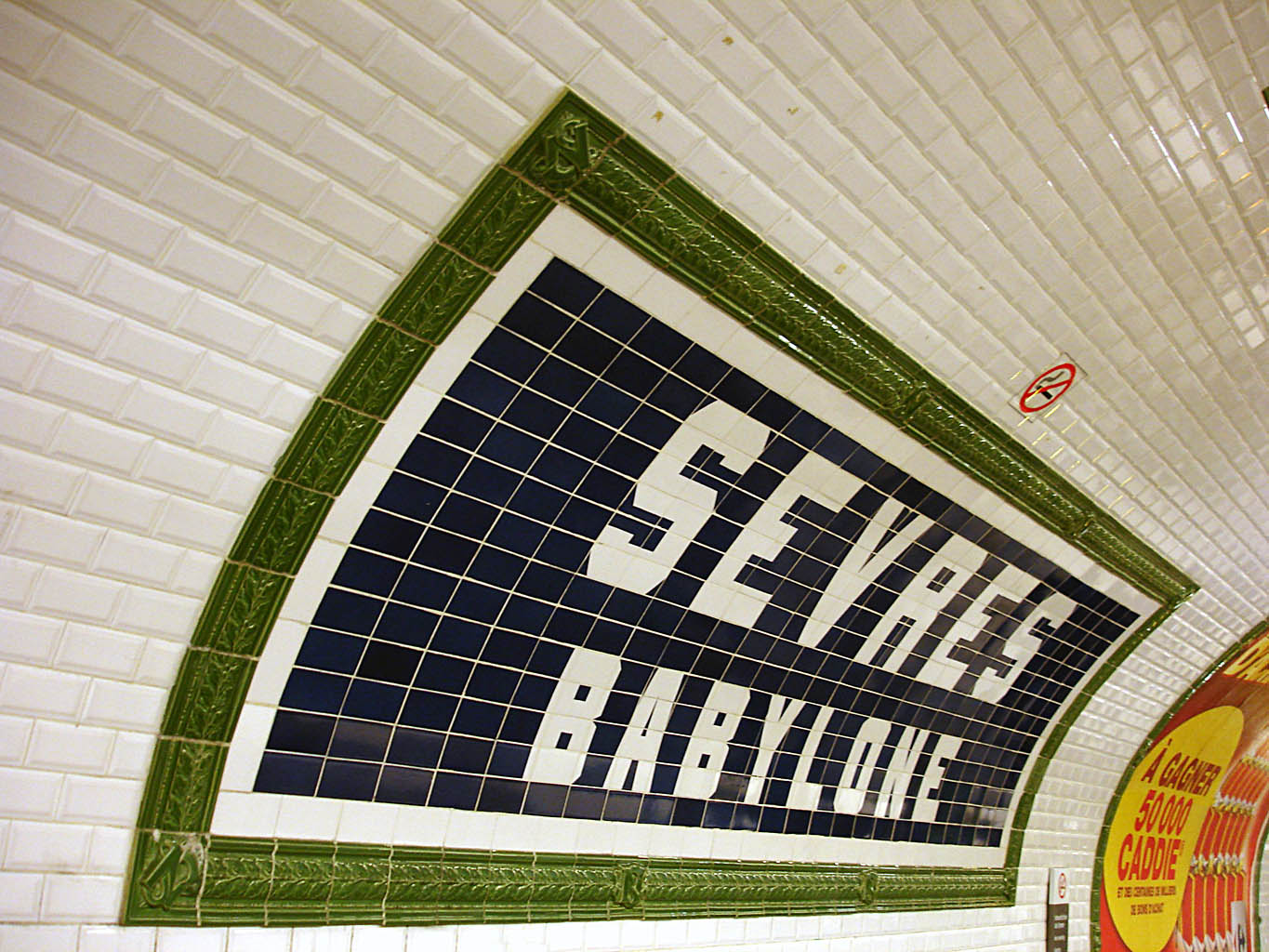
Nord-Sud sign typical of a connecting station at Sèvres–Babylone

The Nord-Sud company, in full the North-South Underground Electric Railway Company of Paris (French: Société du chemin de fer électrique souterrain Nord-Sud de Paris), was an operator of underground trains in Paris established in 1904, which built two lines, Line A (now Line 12) and Line B (now part of Line 13) and had a concession to build a third. It was taken over by the Compagnie du chemin de fer métropolitain de Paris (CMP) in 1930 and incorporated into the Paris Métro.

== History ==
=== Concept ===
The north–south was the initiative of Jean-Baptiste Berlier, an engineer from Lyon trained at the École Nationale Supérieure des Mines de Saint-Étienne, who had proposed an underground tubular tramway project in 1897. In 1901 he proposed, with the support of financier Xavier Janicot, to construct a line connecting Montparnasse and Montmartre, using two parallel, deep-level tunnels with metal linings formed from a series of iron rings. This method of construction was intended to allow more direct routes to be taken, unconstrained by the street pattern. The City of Paris approved the project and granted Berlier and Janicot the concession on 28 December 1901. The charter provided that the costs of construction and rolling stock would be borne entirely by the concessionaire, whereas, for the CMP network, the City of Paris had financed the construction of the infrastructure.

The concession covered three proposed lines:

- line A would join Montmartre to Montparnasse as an additional north–south line to the west of line 4
- line B would serve the north-west of Paris only by connecting Saint-Lazare station to Porte de Clichy and Porte de Saint-Ouen
- line C would serve the south-west only by connecting Montparnasse station to Porte de Vanves.

=== Financing and authorisation ===
The Société du chemin de fer électrique souterrain Nord-Sud de Paris (French for "Paris North-South underground electrical railway company", abbreviated to the Nord-Sud company) was created in July 1902 and replaced Berlier and Janicot as the concessionaire. The substitution was approved by a decree on 26 March 1907. The company was affiliated with the Omnium Lyonnais and formed with a capital of two million francs, the capital required increased gradually to seventy-five million francs in 1910, after the raising of thirty-five million francs of capital in 1909.

The Nord-Sud aimed to distinguish itself from its rival by the high-quality decoration of its stations and trains as well as by certain technical differences. Line A between Montmartre and Montparnasse would provide substantial traffic in the absence of an existing line on this route. This was a real threat to the tram companies and to the CMP, which objected to the potential competition. Despite the delay caused by the CMP's opposition the 6.216 kilometres (3.862 mi) line between Montmartre (Place des Abbesses) and Montparnasse was declared of "public utility" (a key step in the French legal process for authorising construction) on 3 April 1905. A law of 19 July 1905 completed the concession by declaring of public utility the complementary sections from Montparnasse to Porte de Versailles and the branch to Saint-Lazare and the Porte de Saint-Ouen. The extension of 1.317 kilometres (0.818 mi) from Abbesses to Jules Joffrin was declared of public utility on 10 April 1908. The 1.427 kilometres (0.887 mi) stretch from La Fourche to Porte de Clichy was declared of public utility on 11 June 1909. On 24 January 1912 the 2.067 kilometres (1.284 mi) extension from Jules Joffrin to Porte de la Chapelle was approved and finally the 2.749 kilometres (1.708 mi) line C from Montparnasse to Porte de Vanves was approved on 19 July 1912. This brought the total length of the network approved under the concession to 19.789 kilometres (12.296 mi).

=== Construction ===
During early studies, it appears that construction of a deep underground railway as in London quickly proved impossible because of the different nature of the ground in Paris. Beneath the water table, soil is actually very diverse in nature and waterlogged, making it impossible to build a metal tunnel. Establishing the line at an even greater depth would have been more expensive.

The lines were built well above the water table, like those of the CMP, just below the road, which meant that the line had a particularly tortuous alignment contrary to the original plans. The characteristics of the railway provided the specifications are similar to those of the CMP lines in relation to loading gauge, maximum grades and the minimum radius of curvature.

Although the cost of construction was fully funded by the company, the City of Paris placed a levy on each ticket sold. It represented one centime per ticket for traffic of less than thirty millions passengers; for higher traffic levels the fee increased to two centimes per 2nd class ticket and 2.5 centimes for a 1st class ticket. The ticket price was set at 15 centimes in 2nd class and 25 centimes for 1st class. A return fare was fixed at 20 centimes, with a period of validity of only eight hours. In fact, fares were identical on the Nord-Sud and CMP networks, with transfers between networks to be provided free by the concession.

=== Opening ===
After fast construction despite the difficulties, Line A opened on 5 November 1910 from Porte de Versailles to Notre-Dame-de-Lorette, despite being postponed because of the 1910 flood. Line B opened on 26 February 1911 from Saint-Lazare to Porte de Saint-Ouen. The new network was technically very similar to that of its direct competitor, but the stations and rolling stock were more elaborate. The station names were written in porcelain instead of the enamel plates used by CMP, and directions to the trains were set out in tiles in the roofs of the tunnels.

The section of line A from Notre Dame de Lorette to Pigalle opened on 9 April 1911; the section of line B from La Fourche to Porte de Clichy opened on 20 January 20, 1912; and finally the section of line A from Pigalle to Jules Joffrin opened on 30 October 1912. The completion of the northern end of line A from Jules Joffrin to Porte de la Chapelle was then delayed by the outbreak of World War I. The Nord-Sud company completed this extension during the war: it was opened on 23 August 1916.

=== Legacy ===
During the 1920s the company took the necessary steps for building line C, Porte de Vanves to Montparnasse. But the construction costs of Nord-Sud lines made it impossible for it to survive and on 1 January 1931, it was taken over by mutual agreement by its rival, the CMP.

The former lines of the Nord-Sud company were then gradually integrated into the CMP network: old line A became line 12 and line B became line 13. Line C was built soon after by the CMP during the 1930s and became old line 14, until it was absorbed by line 13 in 1976 following the construction of an intermediate section. Line 14 reappeared on the map 22 years later when it opened in 1998.
