= Quartier de La Chapelle =

Coordinates: 48°53′36″N 2°21′49″E

- Neighborhood
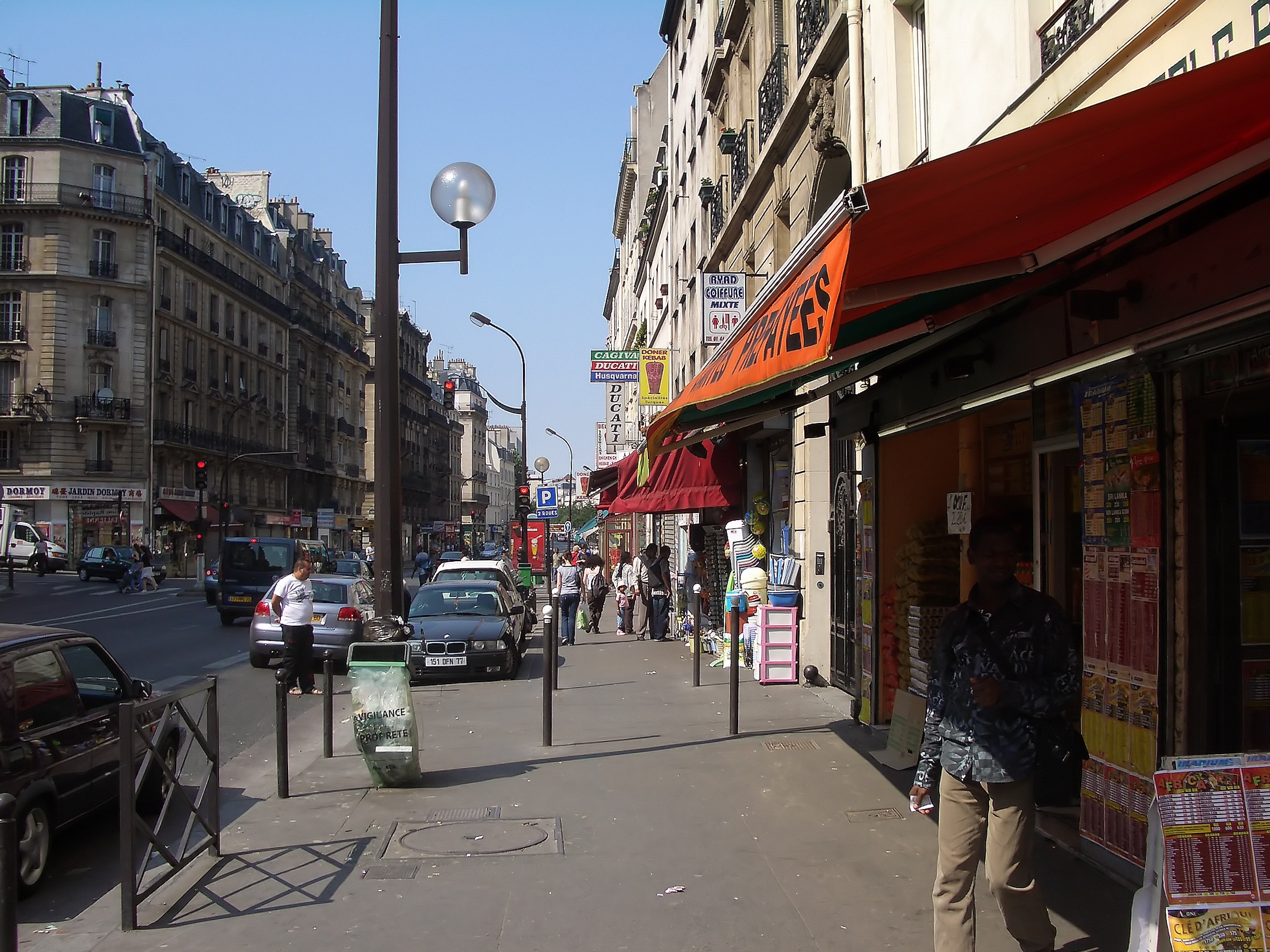
- Rue Marx Dormoy looking north.

- Location within the 18th arrondissement.
- Country: France
- Region: Île-de-France
- City: Paris
- Arrondissement: 18th

Area
  - Total: 1.348 km^{2} (0.520 sq mi)

Population (2016)
  - Total: 24,849
  - Density: 18,430/km^{2} (47,740/sq mi)

The Quartier de La Chapelle (French pronunciation: [kaʁtje də la ʃapɛl]) is a neighborhood of Paris, in the eastern part of the 18th arrondissement. It was originally the village of La Chapelle on the outskirts of Paris and a commune in its own right, separated from the commune of Paris by the wall of the Farmers-General. As part of the city's major 19th-century expansion, the former village was absorbed by Paris in 1860.

== Historical events ==
In the 19th century, Napoleon III decided upon the advice of Georges-Eugène Haussmann, the planner of Paris renewal, to annex some of Paris suburban territories, which existed beyond the fortified enclosure. The 16 June 1859 law pertaining to Paris expansion from the Wall of the Ferme générale to Thiers Wall (In French: La loi relative à l'extension de Paris du mur des Fermiers généraux à l'enceinte de Thiers) revoked the status of La Chapelle "village". The village area was fragmented between Paris, Saint-Denis, Aubervilliers and Saint-Ouen.

In 1895, cardboards decorators had their workshops in the Quartier de la Chapelle. They created carnival chariot used by Paris students in the Mid-Lent parade.

After the Thiers Wall decommissioning in 1919, suburban territories which belonged to Saint-Denis and Aubervillers underwent some changes; they were finally attached to Paris due to the application of the 27 July 1930 decrees.

Afterwards the neighborhood has experienced several urbanisation events: the constructions of Boucry and SuperChapelle skyscraper in the 1970s, ZAC Evangile in the 1980s and ZAC Pajol in the 21st century.

Between 2015 and 2017, a humanitarian accommodation centre welcomed male migrants. The Concordet Campus has replaced the centre.

In 2017, the neighborhood drew media attention after female inhabitants had reported sexual harassment. A petition to increase the neighborhood's security gathered thousand signatures in two days.

== Administration ==
The Quartier de Chapelle is the 72th neighbourhood of Paris and it belongs to the 18th district of the town. Since 2002, two neighborhood councils have organized unofficially the district life : The first one Chapelle-Marx-Domoy for the north sector and the second one, Charles-Hermite-Evangile for the south sector. The street named Boucry separates both.

== Monuments and Public places ==
- Marché de la Chapelle, registered as Monument historique in 1981 by the French authorities
- Espace de glisse parisien, an indoor skate park

== Famous personalities ==
- French historian François Eudes de Mézeray died in 1683 in his country home, located in the neighborhood.
- Louise de Marillac, founder of the religious congregation Les Filles de la Charité lived in the neighborhood from 1636 à 1641

== Historical anecdotes ==
Suzanne Leclézio (1898 - 1987) and Yvonne Ziegler (1902 - 1988) helped the neighborhood's inhabitants during the bombardment of the 21st April 1944 (World War II).

== Local associations ==
- La Bonne Tambouille, active the second Saturday of each month at the Place Pierre-Mac-Olan
