= 18th arrondissement of Paris =

- Municipal arrondissement
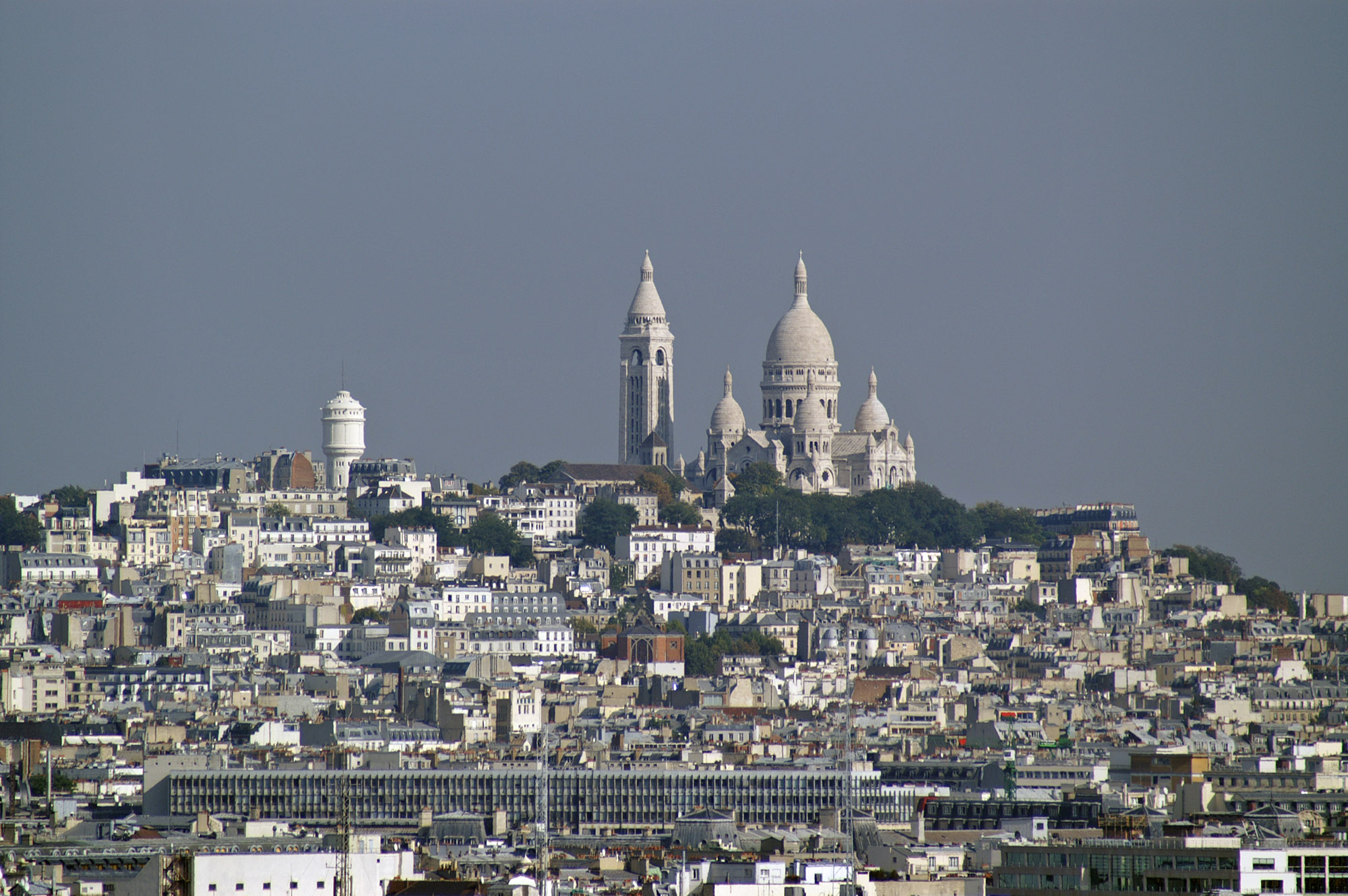
- View over Montmartre district

- Coat of arms

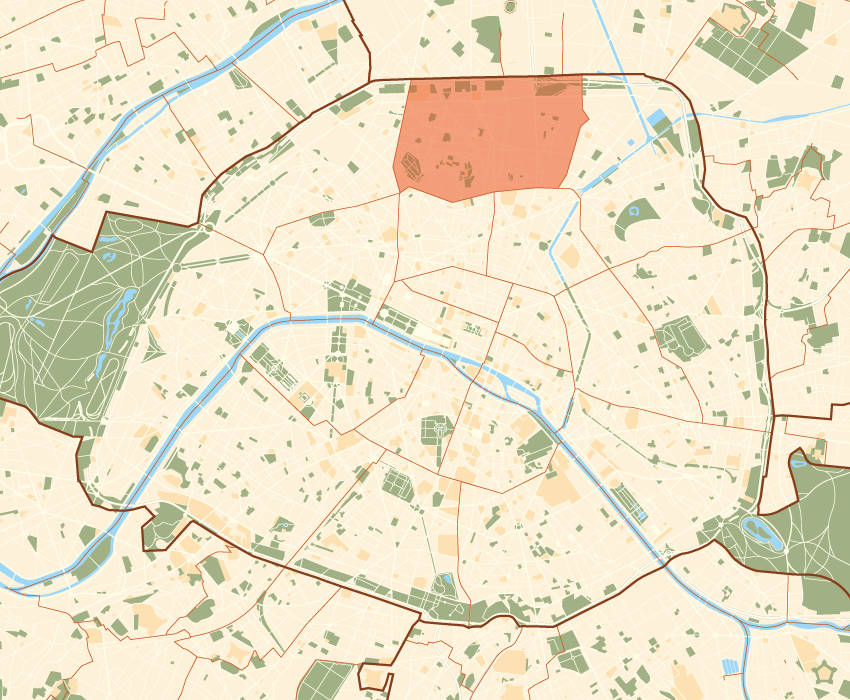
- Location within Paris
- Coordinates: 48°53′32″N 2°20′40″E
- Country: France
- Region: Île-de-France
- Department: Paris
- Commune: Paris

Government
  - Mayor (2020–2026): Éric Lejoindre (PS)
- Area: 6.01 km^{2} (2.32 sq mi)
- Population (2023): 183,127
  - Density: 30,500/km^{2} (78,900/sq mi)
- INSEE code: 75118

The 18th arrondissement of Paris (XVIII^{e} arrondissement) is one of the 20 arrondissements, or administrative districts, of the capital city of France. In spoken French, this arrondissement is referred to as dix-huitième. In 2023, it had a population of 183,127.

The arrondissement, known as Butte-Montmartre, is located on the right bank of the River Seine. It is mostly known for hosting the large hill of Montmartre, which is known for its artistic history, the Bateau-Lavoir where Pablo Picasso, Georges Braque, and Amedeo Modigliani lived and worked in the early 20th century, the house of music diva Dalida, the Moulin Rouge cabaret, other historic features, and the prominent Sacré Cœur basilica which sits atop the hill.

The 18th arrondissement also contains Goutte d'Or district, which has large numbers of residents of North and sub-Saharan African origins, and which is famous for its market, the marché Barbès, which sells products from Africa.

== Geography ==
The quarters of the 18th arrondissement

The land area of this arrondissement is exactly 6.005 km^{2} (2.319 sq mi; 1,484 acres).

The arrondissement consists of four quarters:

- Quartier Grandes-Carrières (69)
- Quartier Clignancourt (70)
- Quartier Goutte-d'Or (71)
- Quartier Chapelle (72)

== Demographics ==
The population of Paris's 18th arrondissement peaked in 1931 with 288,810 inhabitants. Today, the arrondissement remains very dense in population and business activity.

=== Historical population ===
Historical population

Year	Pop.	±% p.a.
1861	106,356	—
1872	138,109	+2.40%
1881	181,754	+3.10%
1891	214,258	+1.66%
1901	253,591	+1.70%
1911	274,714	+0.80%
1921	284,986	+0.37%
1931	288,810	+0.13%
1936	276,727	−0.85%
1946	259,589	−0.64%
1954	266,825	+0.34%

Year	Pop.	±% p.a.
1962	254,974	−0.57%
1968	236,776	−1.23%
1975	208,970	−1.77%
1982	186,866	−1.58%
1990	187,657	+0.05%
1999	184,586	−0.18%
2007	191,523	+0.46%
2012	201,374	+1.01%
2017	195,233	−0.62%
2023	183,127	−1.06%

Source: Demographia (1861-1999) and INSEE (1876-2023)

=== Immigration ===
In 2012, John Henley of The Guardian said the 18th arrondissement was "an area comparable in many ways to London's Tower Hamlets."

Place of birth of residents of the 18th arrondissement in 1999
Born in metropolitan France	Born outside metropolitan France			
72.5%	27.5%			
72.5%	Born in overseas France	Born in foreign countries with French citizenship at birth^{1}	EU-15 immigrants^{2}	Non-EU-15 immigrants
72.5%	1.9%	3.6%	3.9%	18.1%
^{1} This group is made up largely of former French settlers, such as pieds-noirs in Northwest Africa, followed by former colonial citizens who had French citizenship at birth (such as was often the case for the native elite in French colonies), as well as to a lesser extent foreign-born children of French expatriates. A foreign country is understood as a country not part of France in 1999, so a person born for example in 1950 in Algeria, when Algeria was an integral part of France, is nonetheless listed as a person born in a foreign country in French statistics.^{2} An immigrant is a person born in a foreign country not having French citizenship at birth. An immigrant may have acquired French citizenship since moving to France, but is still considered an immigrant in French statistics. On the other hand, persons born in France with foreign citizenship (the children of immigrants) are not listed as immigrants.

== Cityscape ==
=== Places of interest ===
- Basilique du Sacré-Cœur, Paris
- Basilica of Sainte-Jeanne-d'Arc (Paris)
- Église Saint-Jean-de-Montmartre
- Église Saint-Bernard de la Chapelle
- Notre-Dame de Clignancourt
- Moulin Rouge
- Musée d'Art Naïf – Max Fourny
- Montmartre Synagogue

The Serbian Orthodox Eparchy of Western Europe has its headquarters in the arrondissement.

=== Districts within the 18th arrondissement ===
- Montmartre
- Pigalle
- Goutte d'Or, a working-class neighborhood in the arrondissement
- Quartier de La Chapelle

== Economy ==
Dailymotion formerly had its headquarters in the arrondissement. In addition, Dargaud also has its headquarters there.
