= Rue de Lille (Paris) =

Street in Paris

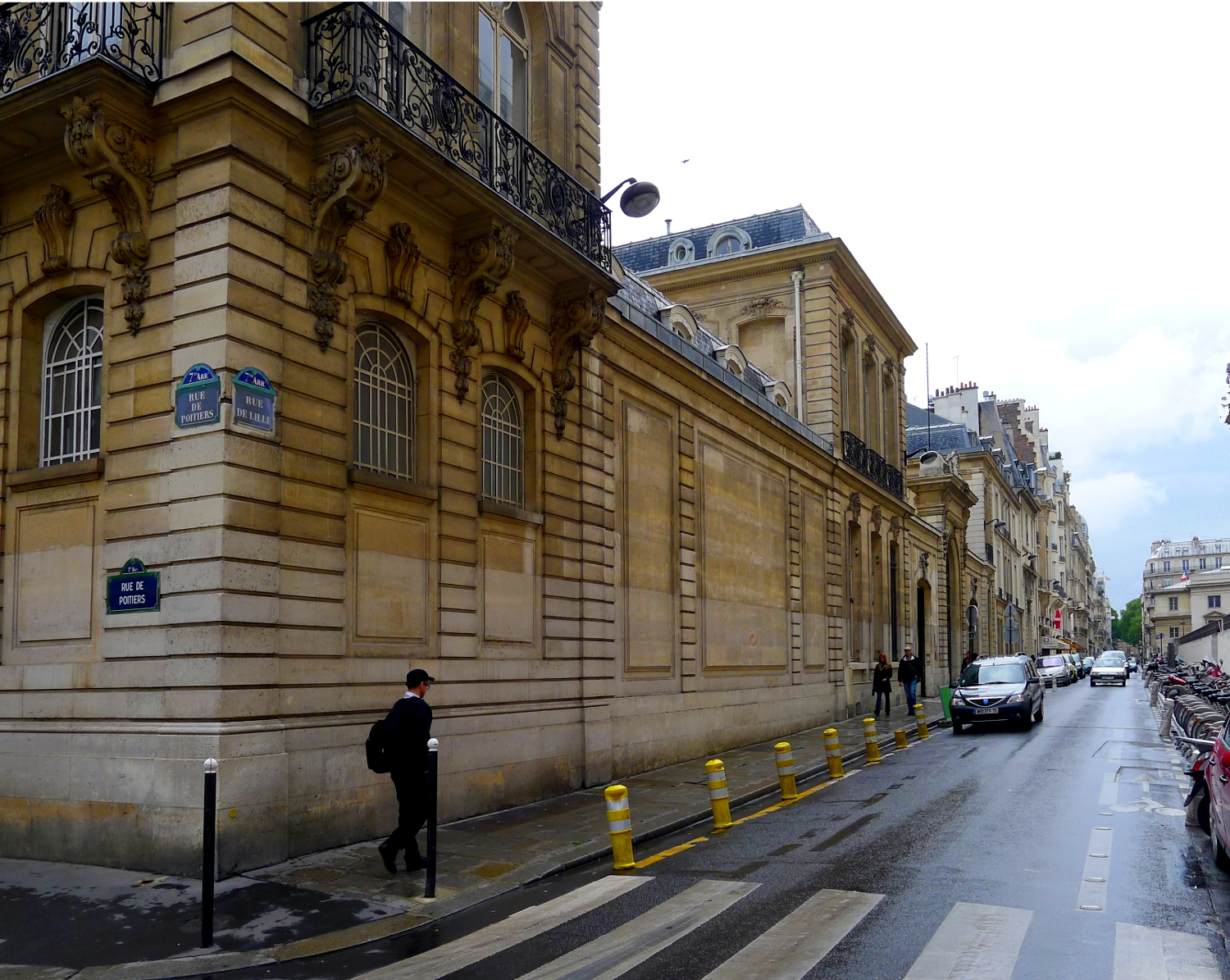
- The corner of Rue de Lille and Rue de Poitiers

- Location within Paris
- Former name: Rue de Bourbon
- Namesake: Lille
- Type: Street
- Length: 1,060 m (3,480 ft)
- Width: 9.74 m
- Location: Paris, France
- Arrondissement: 7th
- Quarter: Saint-Thomas-d'Aquin, Invalides
- Postal code: 75007
- Nearest metro station: Solférino; Assemblée Nationale
- Coordinates: 48.8593°N 2.3271°E
- From: Rue des Saints-Pères
- To: Rue Aristide-Briand

Construction
- Commissioned: c. 1640

The Rue de Lille is a street in the 7th arrondissement of Paris, France, in the upscale Saint-Thomas-d'Aquin and Invalides quarters.

== Location and access ==
The street is 1,060 metres (3,480 ft) long. It begins on the Rue des Saints-Pères and ends on Rue Aristide-Briand.

By metonymy, it may refer to the Institut national des langues et civilisations orientales (INALCO), which occupied n^{o} 2 from 1873 to 2011, or to the Gaullist party (UNR, UDR, then RPR), which occupied n^{o} 123 from 1958 to 2001.

The Solférino and Assemblée Nationale Métro stations serve the street.

== Name origin ==
The name recalls the heroic defense of the city of Lille against the Austrian army during the siege of 1792.

== History ==
The street was opened around 1640, under the name Rue de Bourbon in honor of Henri de Bourbon, abbot of Saint-Germain-des-Prés, on part of the large Pré-aux-Clercs meadow – whose name survives in today's Rue du Pré-aux-Clercs – on the territory of the Saint-Germain-des-Prés Abbey. At the time, it ended in the large meadow where driftwood from the Morvan was stored, running roughly in line with the Rue de Bellechasse.

A Council ruling of 18 October 1704, prescribing the opening of the Rue de Bourgogne, also ordered that the Rue de Bourbon be extended to this new public thoroughfare. A letter patent dated 9 October 1719 ordered the continuation of the Rue de Bourbon from the Rue de Bourgogne to the rampart, but this project was never carried out.

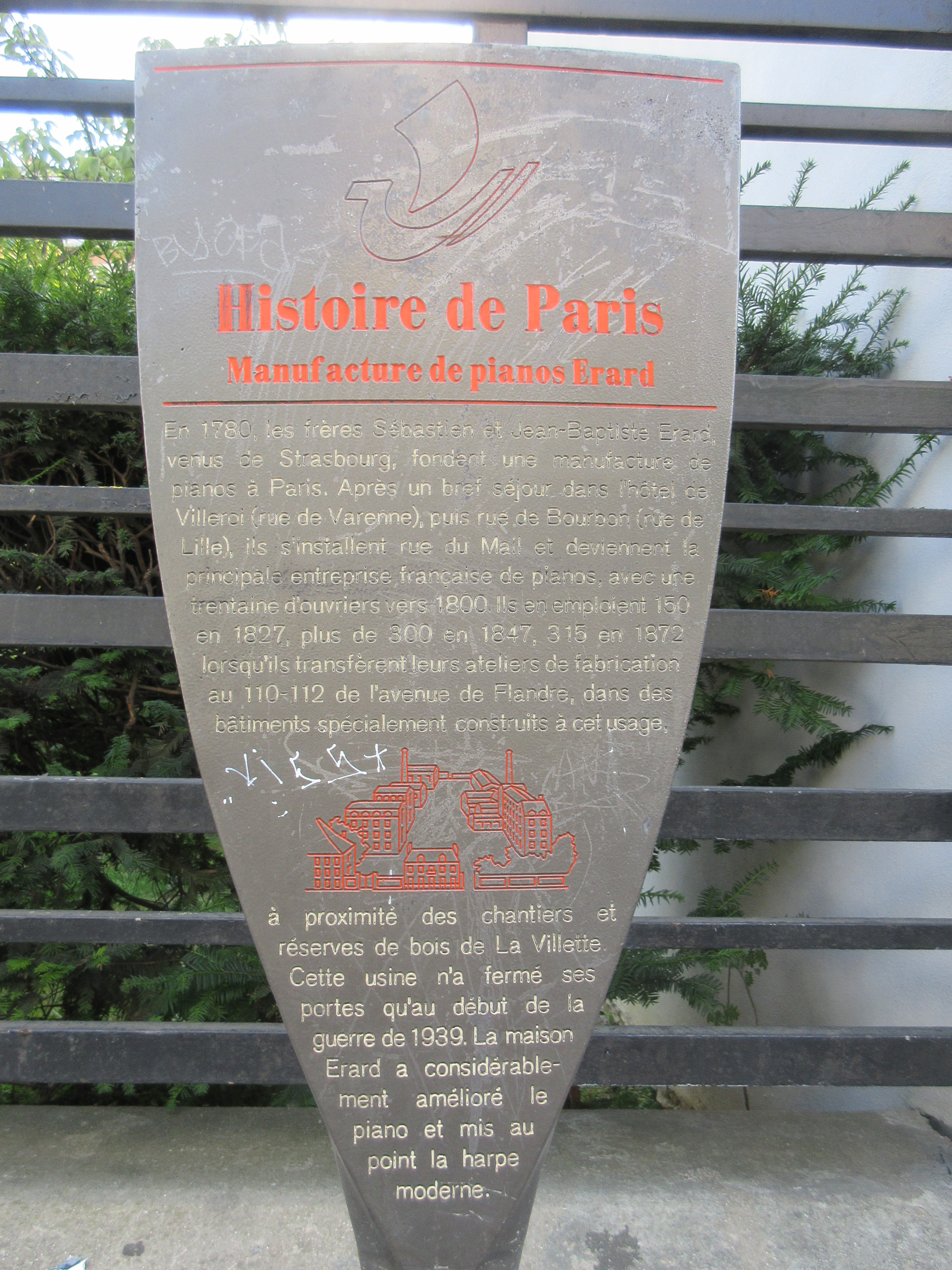
History of Paris sign 'Manufacture de pianos Érard'

In 1780, the Érard piano factory was temporarily located on the Rue de Bourbon.

On 27 October 1792, the commune's general council decided that the Rue de Bourbon should be renamed the Rue de Lille.

In 1815, the Restoration reinstated the name "Rue de Bourbon"; after the July Revolution of 1830, the street reverted to "Rue de Lille".

On 11 March 1918, during the First World War, n^{o} 100 Rue de Lille was hit by a German air raid.

The Rue de Lille during the Seine flood of 1910

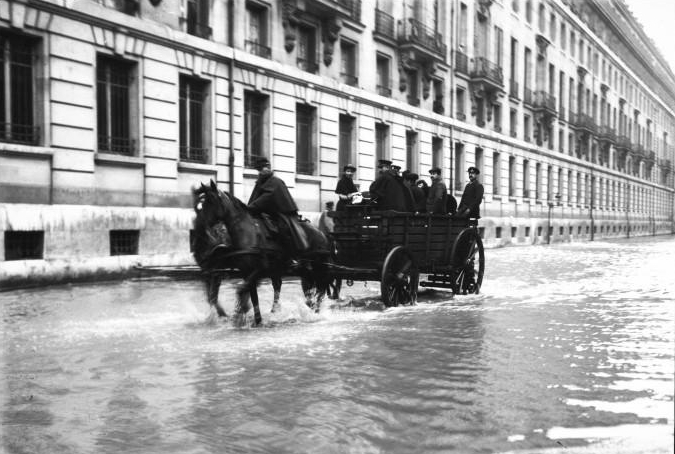

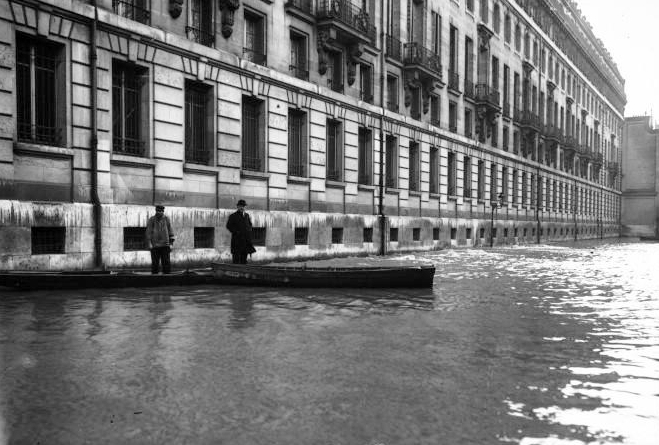

=== Notable buildings and residents ===
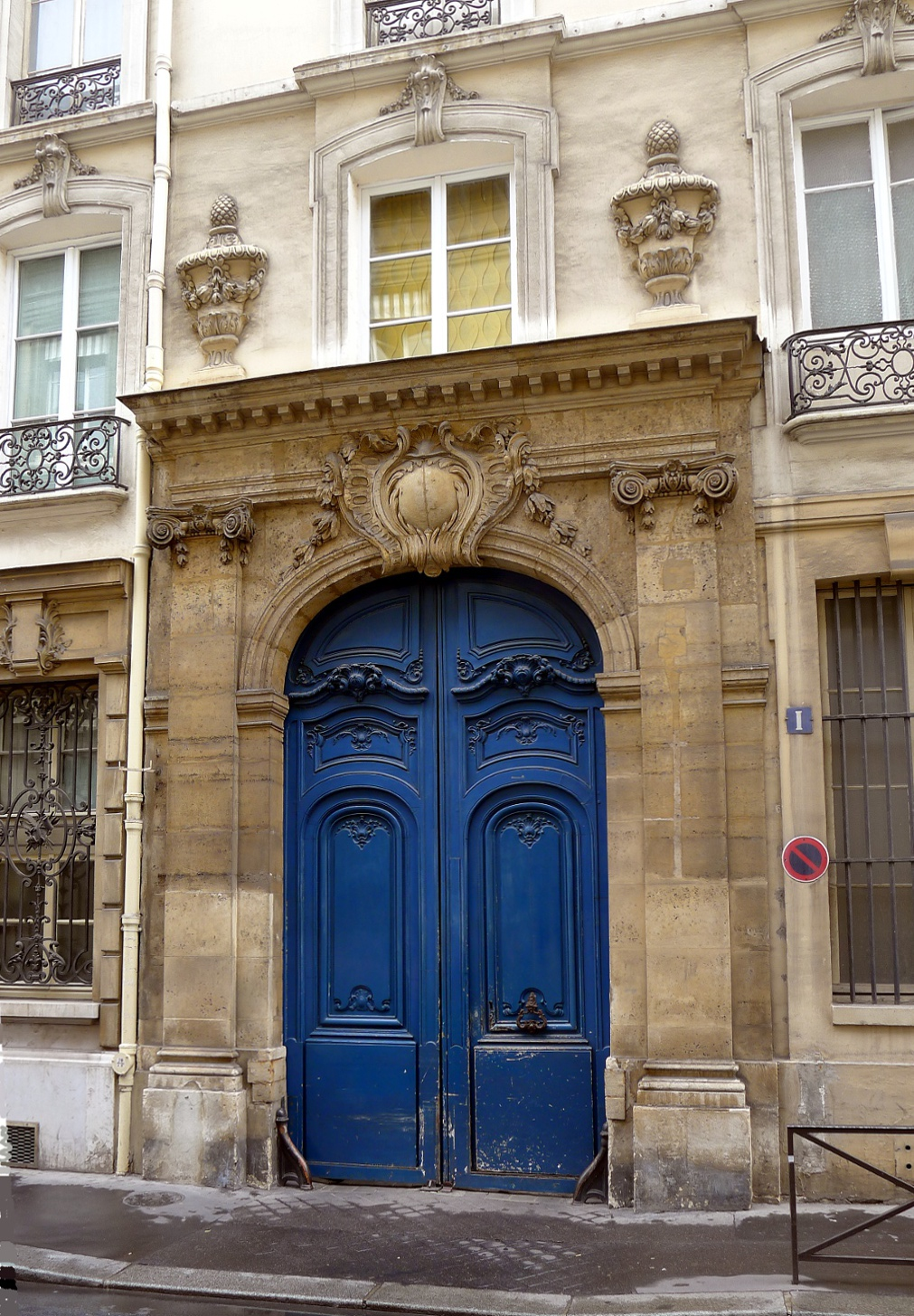
Gate to n^{o} 1.

- N^{o}. Unknown: Tristan Tzara died here on 24 December 1963.
- N^{o}. Unknown: The psychiatrist Achille-Louis Foville (1799–1878) lived here in December 1842, at the time of the birth of his son, the economist Alfred de Foville.
- N^{o}. 1: Address of musician Adolphe Piriou (1878–1964) from October 1904. Former Prime Minister Jacques Chaban-Delmas (1915–2000) lived in an apartment at this address, where he died of a heart attack on 10 November 2000.
- N^{o}. 2: Institut national des langues et civilisations orientales (INALCO), formerly known as École nationale des langues orientales vivantes - commonly referred to as "Langues'O" - which has been located here since 1874. Following the transfer of the school's headquarters in October 2011 to the Pôle des langues et civilisations, work was carried out in 2011–2012 to bring together INALCO's research centers and teams on rue de Lille in October 2012.
- N^{o}. 4: Library of the École des langues orientales, integrated into the BULAC and transferred to the Pôle des langues et civilisations in 2010.

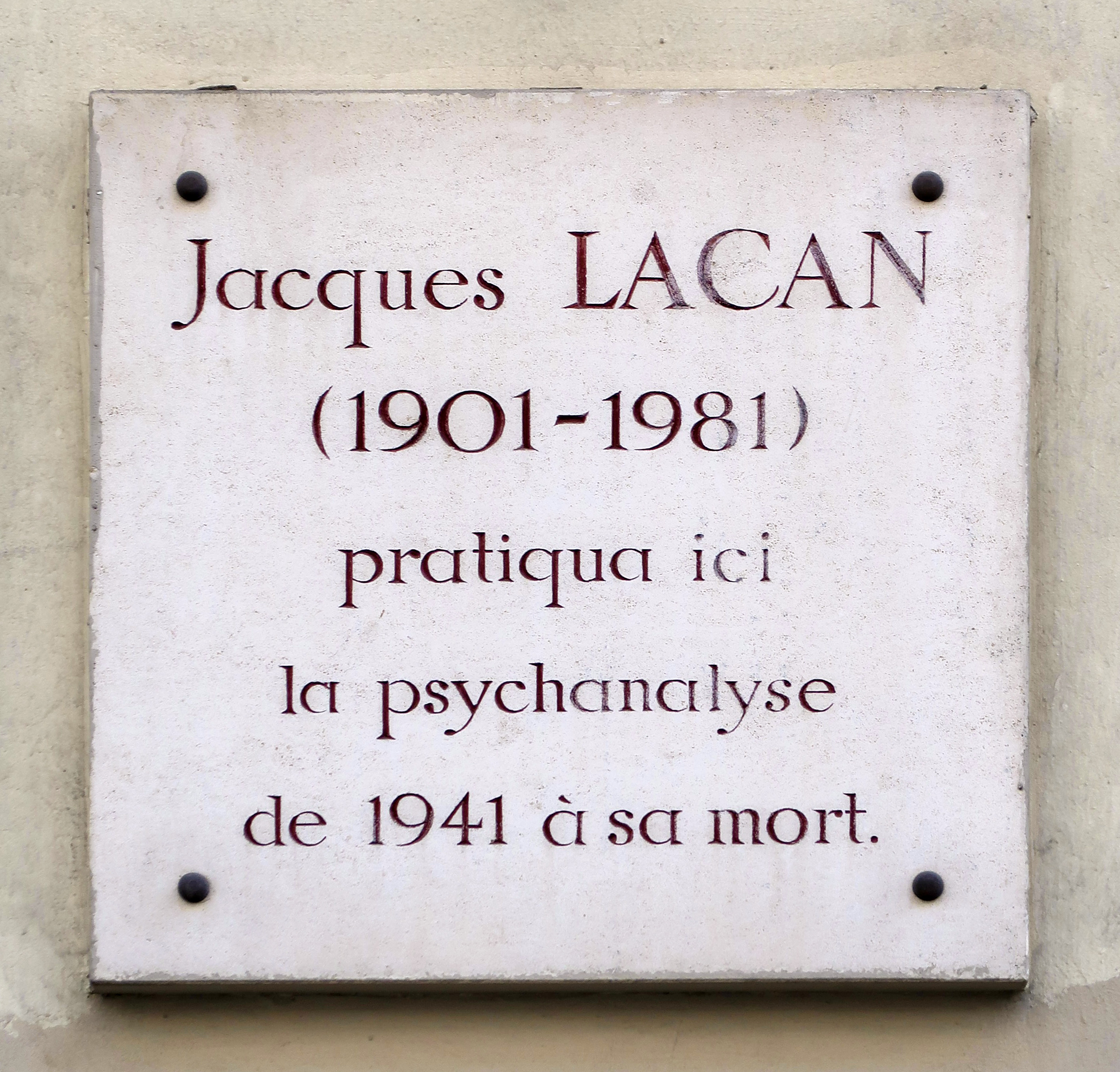
Plaque at n^{o} 5.

- N^{o}. 5: Psychoanalyst Jacques Lacan had his practice in this building; a commemorative plaque pays tribute to him. Philippe Sollers writes: "I go to 5, rue de Lille and I come across the address of Lacan, who, as we know, practiced his very trying profession of psychoanalyst there from 1940 until his death (in 1981). If Lacan's couch could talk, it would put the entire novel industry in crisis, with its millions of books written for nothing. This address is familiar to me. Although I never lay down at his place, it's where I used to pick him up on certain evenings, to dine in his company at La Calèche, the restaurant across the street. The 5 was a promise of pleasure. But 5, rue de Lille (and this is where time begins to speak in hushed tones) was also the address of a certain Darasse, banker to Isidore Ducasse, comte de Lautréamont, when he came to collect the pension his father sent him from Montevideo (Darasse was in business with that distant country). [...] It was to the same banker, Darasse, that Ducasse, on March 12, 1870 (he died in November, aged 24 and a half, during the German siege of Paris), announced that his method had completely changed after the failure of Les Chants de Maldoror and that in Poésies I and II, therefore) he would sing exclusively of 'hope, expectation, calm, happiness, duty'."
- N^{o}. 7: Karl Lagerfeld's bookshop. At the back of the shop, the couturier kept numerous books on massive shelves.
- N^{o}. 9: African-American writer and journalist Richard Wright (1908–1960) lived in this house.
- N^{o}. 11: Former Klincksieck bookshop.

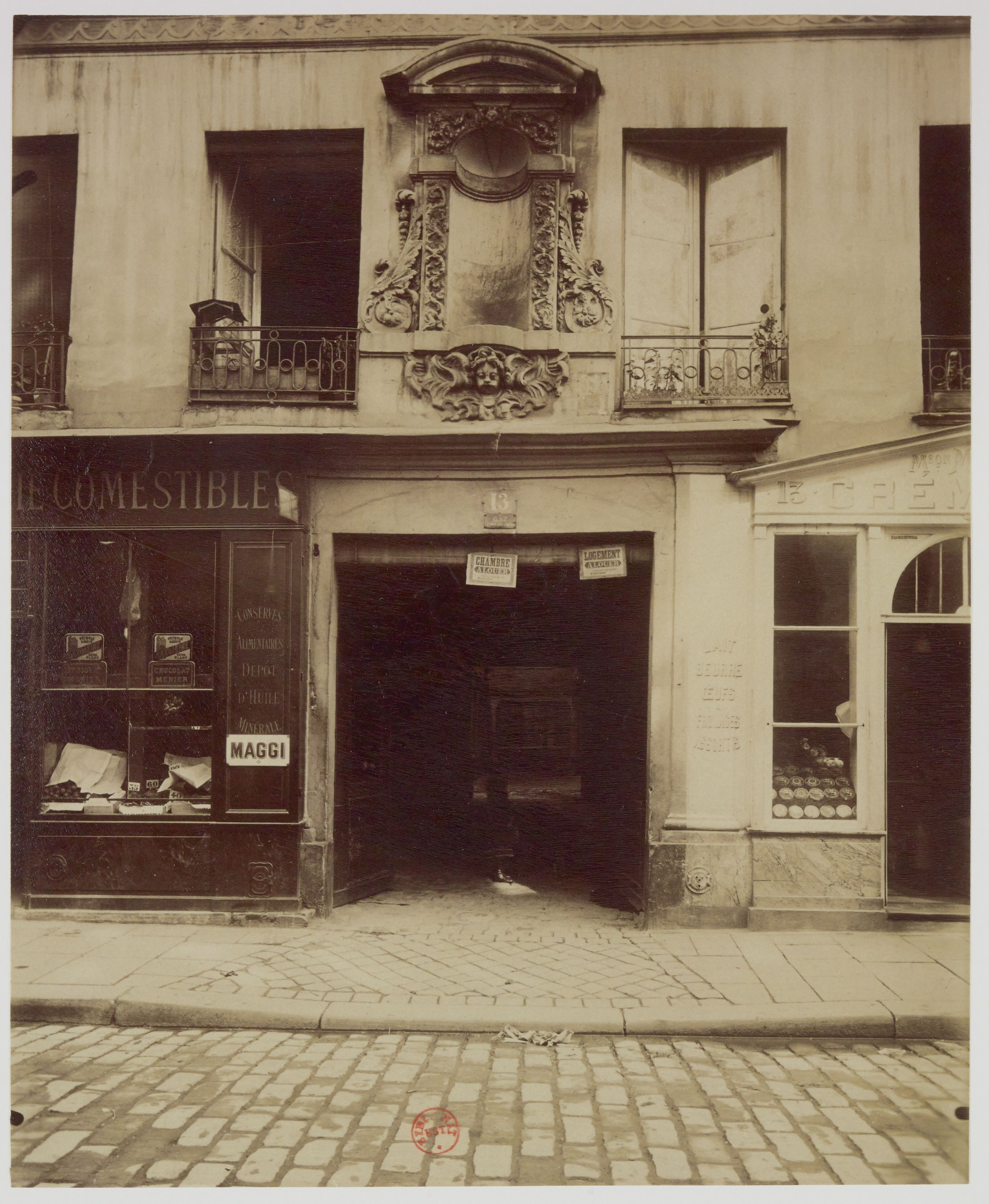
The house at n^{o} 13, photographed by Eugène Atget (c. 1902)

- N^{o}. 13: A house at this address had a wall niche dating to the 18th century, photographed around 1902 by Eugène Atget and drawn by Henri Chapelle in 1909.
- N^{o}. 17: Former address, from 1833 onwards, of the highly reputed educational establishment for girls inaugurated in 1820 on rue de Seine under the name Cours d'éducation maternelle, also known as Cours Lévi after its founder David Lévi Alvarès. The course was attended by Berthe Morisot and her sisters Yves and Edme.

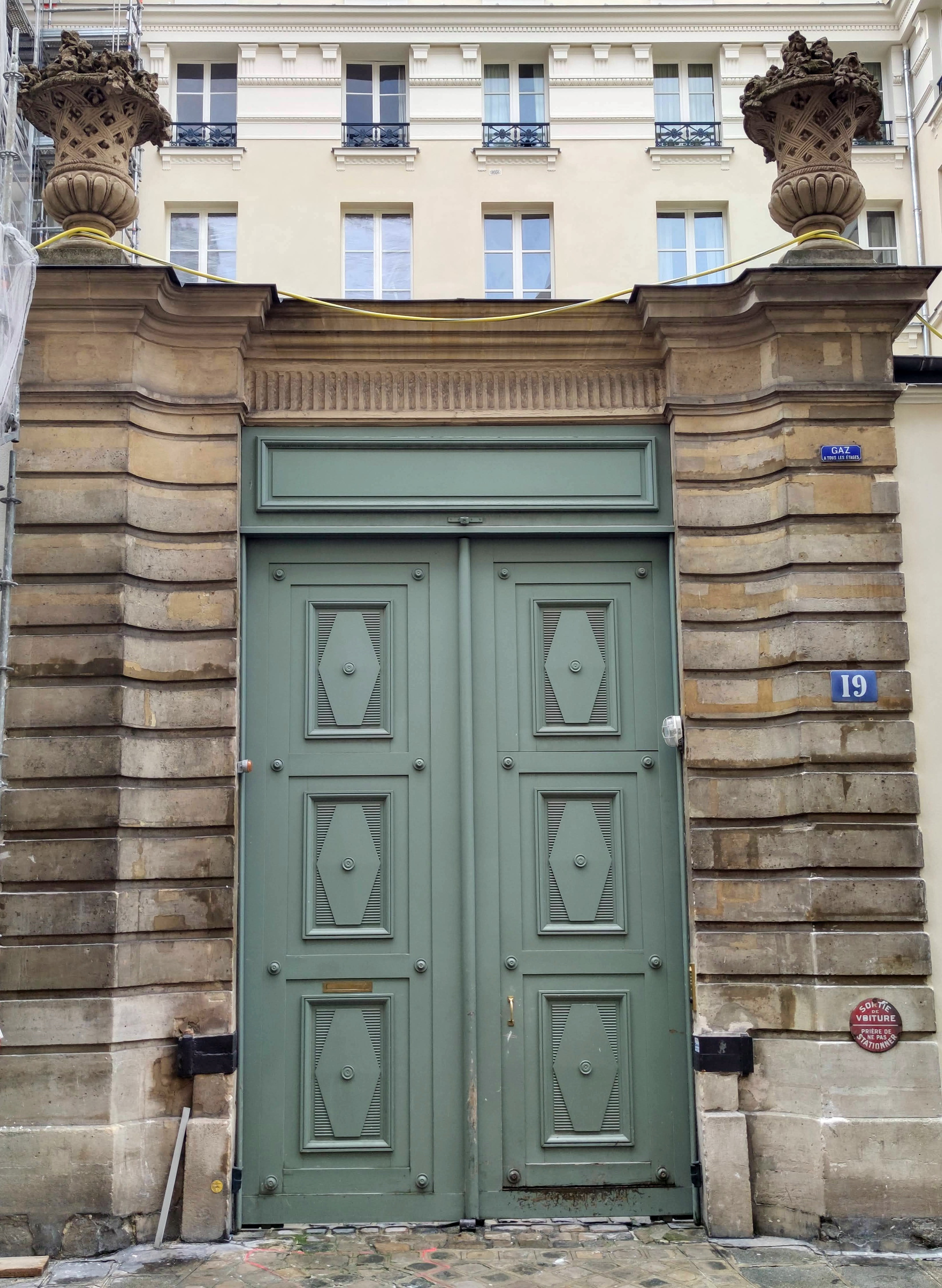
N^{o}. 19

- N^{o}. 19
  - Paris deputy Charles Floquet died in this house on 18 January 1896;
  - Designer Jean Oberlé lived here, notably with his partner, perfumer Germaine Cellier;
  - Max Ernst lived here from 1962 until his death on 1 April 1976;
  - In 1992, Christine Deviers-Joncour, mistress of politician Roland Dumas, took up residence at this address, in a 320 m^{2} apartment purchased by an SCI for 17 million francs, toward which she paid nothing. This apartment was at the heart of the Dumas affair.
- N^{o}. 23: Karl Marx lived here from November 1846 to March 1847.
- N^{o}. 25: Actress and singer Renée Passeur (1905–1975) lived here when she married Steve Passeur in 1934.

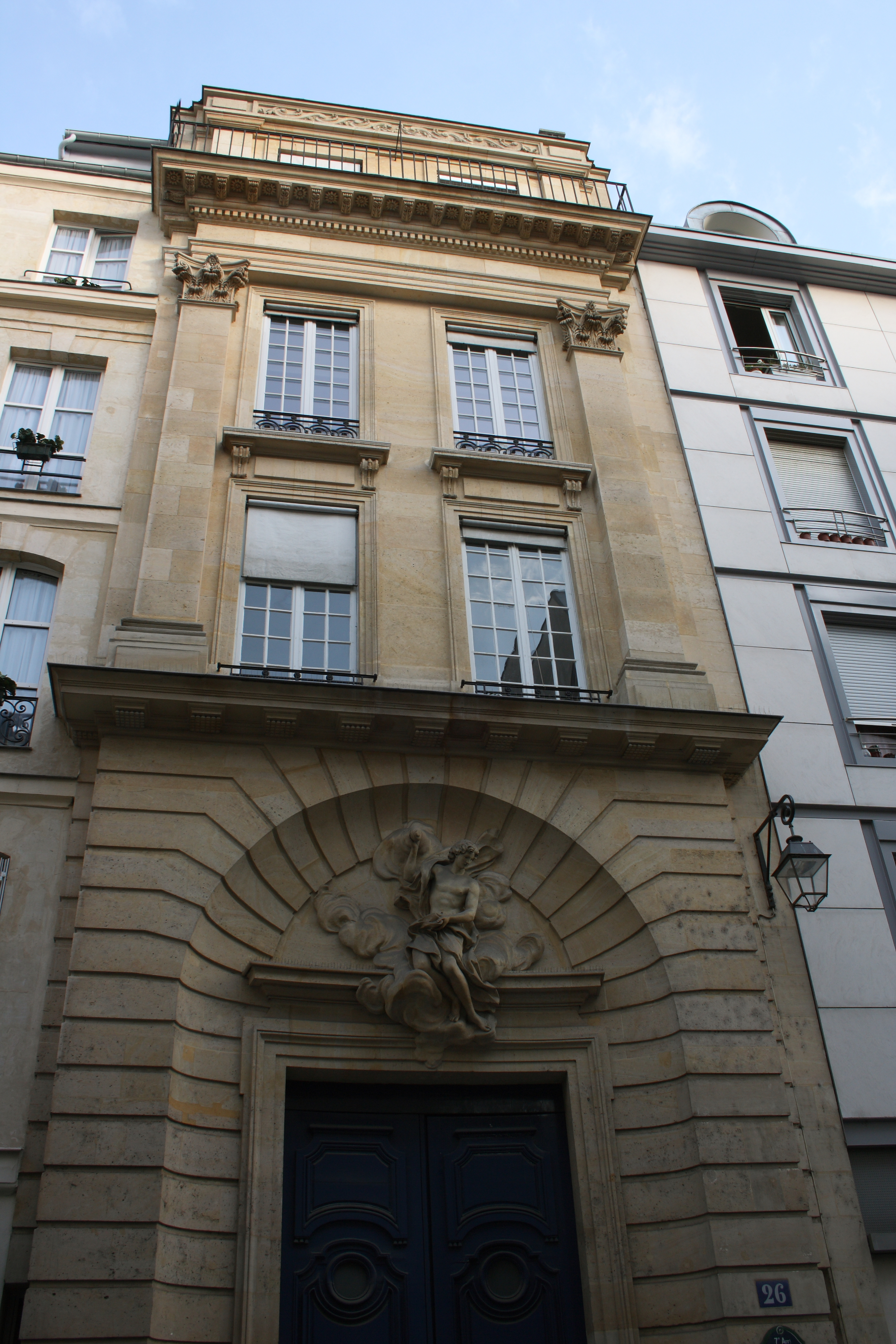
Former entrance to the Theatins convent.

- N^{o}. 26: Remains of the Théatins convent. Established in Paris in 1644, the Théatins, thanks to the generosity of Cardinal Jules Mazarin, bought a house on the site of today's 23, quai Voltaire, which could house 25 monks. They decided to build a church, under the invocation of Sainte-Anne-la-Royale, in honour of Anne of Austria. Work began in 1661 on plans drawn up by a military architect, Maurizio Valperga. In October 1662, the general of the Théatins replaced Valperga with a pupil of Borromini, Camillo-Guarino Guarini, who designed a large, complex Baroque edifice, (Note: He is known for the engraved plates in Guarini's posthumous work Architettura civile (1737).) the cost of which exceeded the Théatins' financial means. Guarini abandoned the project in 1666 when only the arms and pillars of the transept crossing had been built. All that remained was to cover the transept, which became the nave of the church. The building was then completed by architect Nicolas Liévain around 1720–1721, without repeating Guarini's design. The convent was abolished during the French Revolution. For a few years, it was converted into a concert hall and café, before being almost destroyed in 1823. Remains of the eastern façade can be seen in the courtyard at 13, quai Voltaire, while the former chapel of Saint-André-Avelin, built by Liévain, remains, albeit altered, in the courtyard at 30, rue de Lille. Two passageways were also created, opening onto the quay and the street through gates designed by architect Pierre Desmaisons. The gateway on rue de Lille has been preserved and is now n^{o} 26. The gate gives access to a vestibule from which the staircases serving the buildings on either side of the passage open. The rectangular courtyard is decorated with a Doric order. The whole was engraved by La Marcade.
- N^{o}. 30: Investment property built for the Théatins in 1730.
- N^{os}. 33–37 (and rue de Verneuil, rue du Bac, and rue de Beaune): Site of the former Barbier market hall, converted into the barracks of the Mousquetaires-Gris.
- N^{o}. 34: Carle Vernet lived in this building.
- N^{o}. 41: Le Télégraphe restaurant is housed in the former home of the "demoiselles du téléphone", with its Art Nouveau decor.
- N^{o}. 43: On 14 November 1918, two military aircraft flying over Paris crashed, one into the Seine and the other onto the roof of this building, demolishing a chimney.
- N^{o}. 45: Théodore de Gargan lived here from 1840 to January 1848.
- N^{o}. 46: Building housing the presidency of the École pratique des hautes études (EPHE).
- N^{o}. 48: A Baptist church occupies the upper floor of this building; its metal-framed structure was among the first rebuilt on the ruins left by the Commune. In October 1906, having just arrived from New York, American painter Edward Hopper (1882–1967) took a room at this address and stayed until spring 1907. One of his paintings is entitled Escalier au 48, rue de Lille (Staircase at 48, rue de Lille).
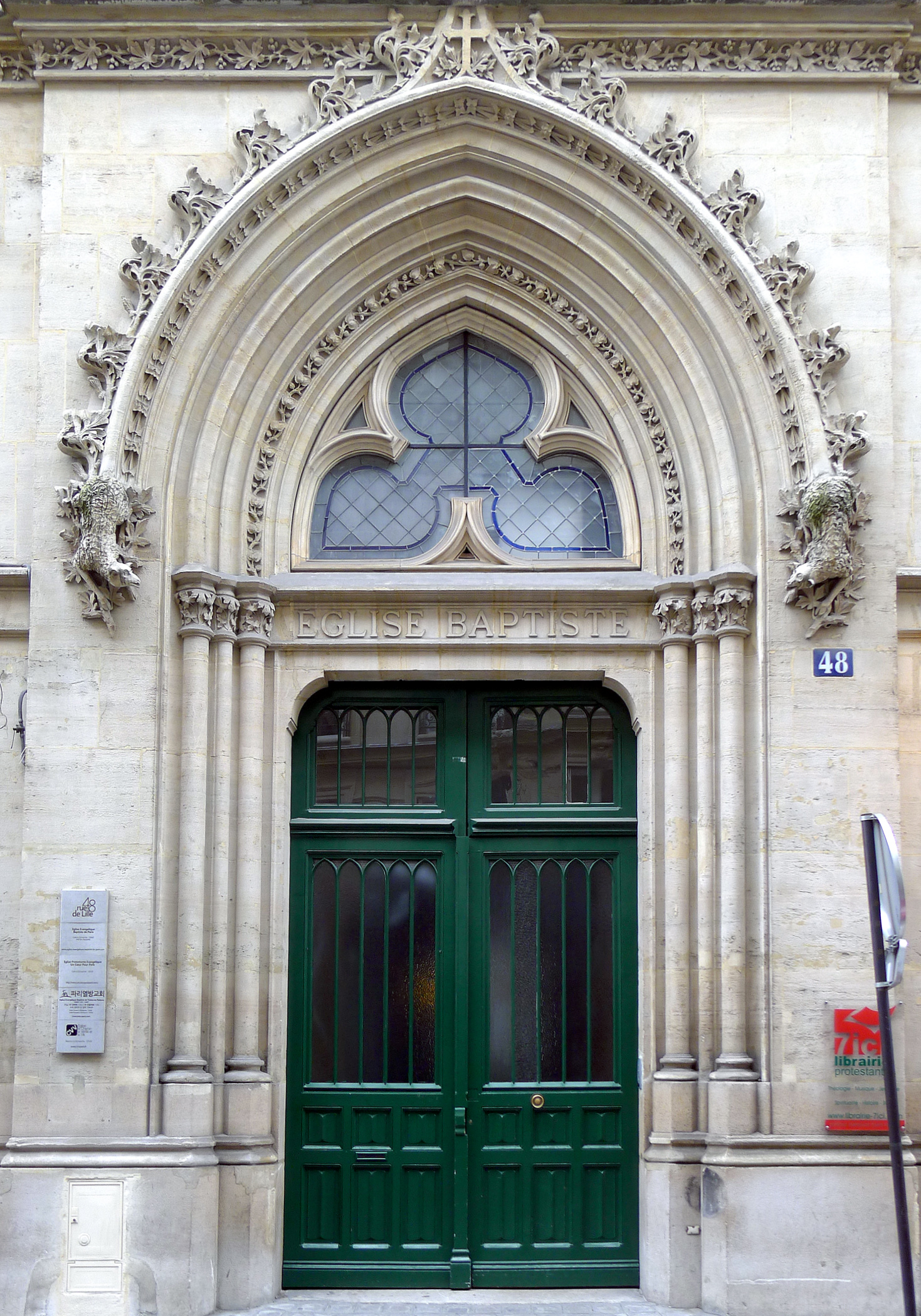
Gate at n^{o} 48.

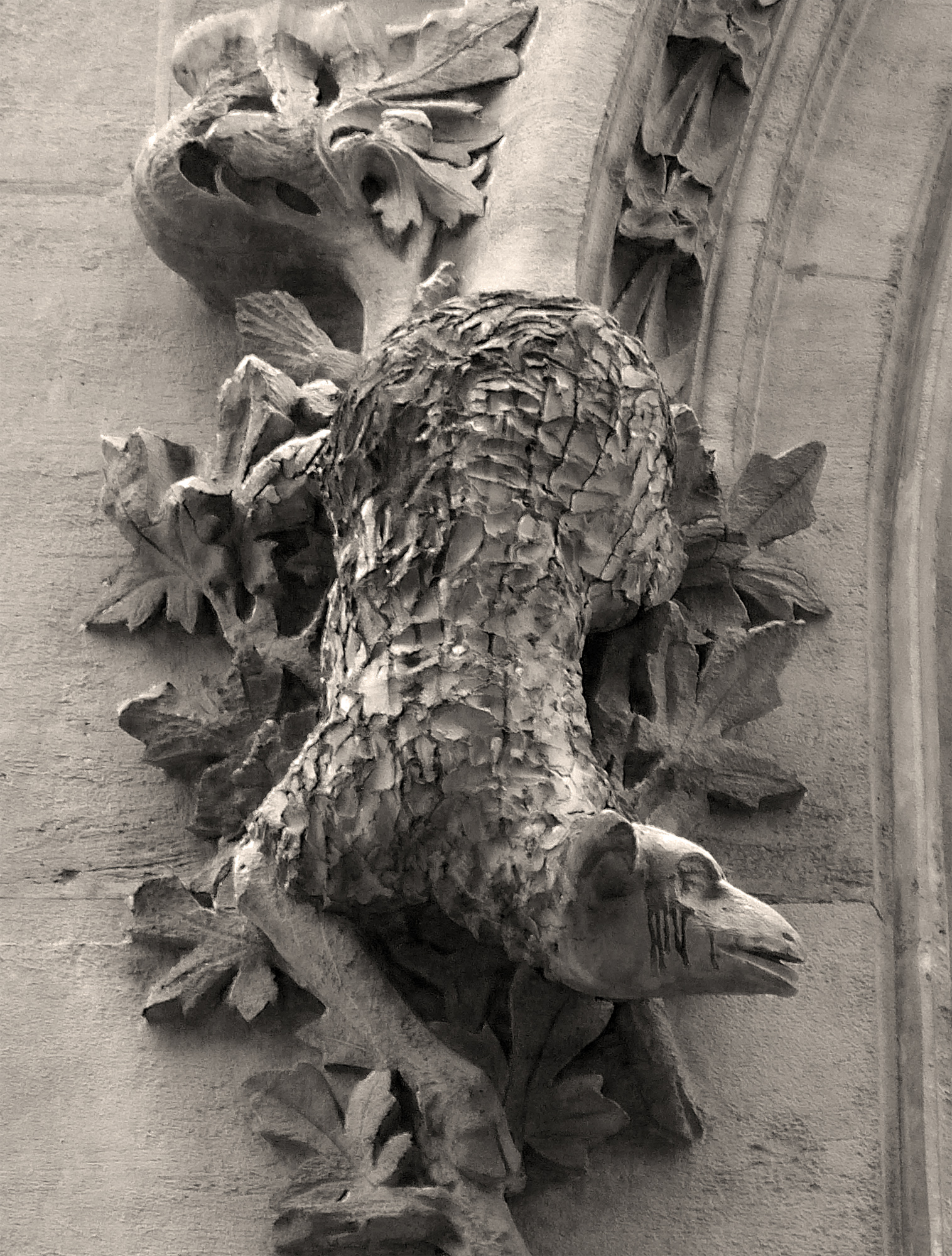
N^{o}. 48: gate detail.
- N^{os}. 49-51-53: In 1930, architect Louis Faure-Dujarric built a functional office complex for the Caisse des dépôts et consignations.
- N^{os}. 52–56: Caisse des dépôts et consignations. This was the Hôtel de Belle-Isle, Prosper Mérimée's home, burnt down during the Commune. Part of his library and all his correspondence were destroyed.
- N^{o}. 56: Built under the Regency by François Bruand and refurbished by Eudes, architect for the Ministry of Finance, in 1858. Burnt down during the Paris Commune in May 1871, it was rebuilt by the same architect in neo-Louis XV style (1873–1880) on a plan close to the original. An office building was subsequently constructed on rue de Lille in the 1930s. See also 1–3, quai Anatole-France (Caisse des dépôts et consignations).
- N^{o}. 55: Hôtel de Clermont-Tonnerre, built by architect Pierre Humbert (second half of the 19th century).
- N^{o}. 60 (and 5–7, quai Anatole-France): Site of the former Tour d'Argent driftwood yard, bought in 1720 by the Marquis de La Vrillière, which became a coach-building firm for the Court, and was later occupied by a barracks of the Légion de police and Imperial Guard guides, under the names "Quartier Eugène", "Quartier Bonaparte", "Quartier Napoléon" and "Quartier d'Orsay".
- N^{o}. 62: Palais d'Orsay, on the site of today's Musée d'Orsay, between Quai Anatole-France and Rue de Lille. The Palais d'Orsay was built in 1810 and occupied by the Conseil d'État on the first floor from 1840, with the Cour des Comptes joining two years later on the second floor. It was burnt down during the Paris Commune, and demolished at the end of the century. The current building was inaugurated in 1910.
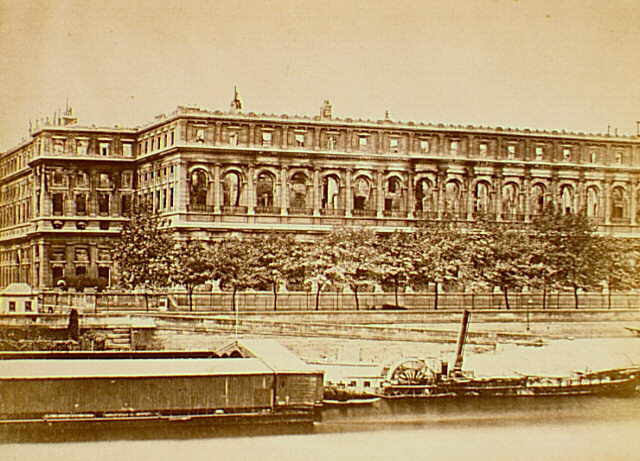
N^{o}. 62: the Palais d'Orsay shortly after it was burnt down by the Commune.

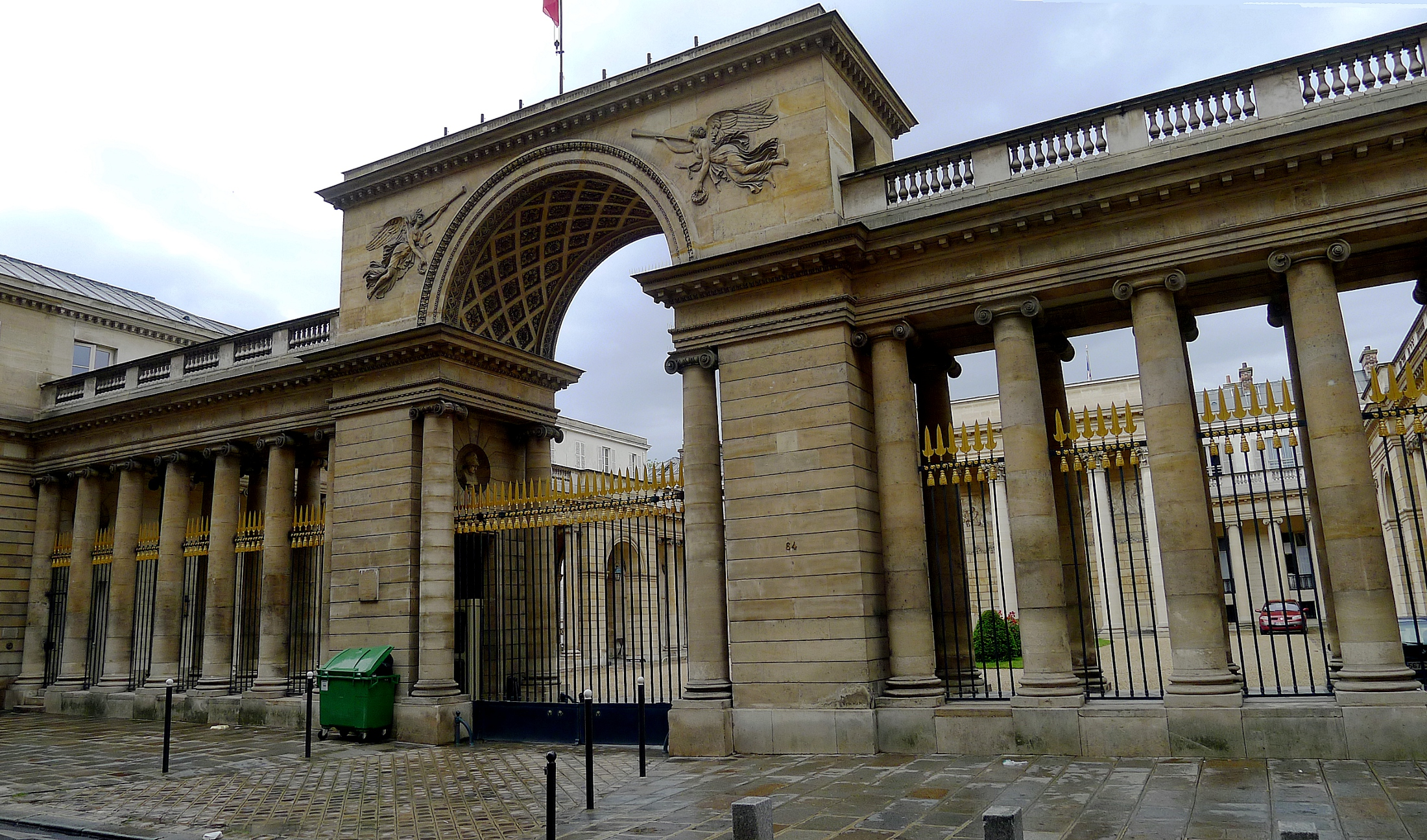
N^{o}. 64: entrance to the Hôtel de Salm.

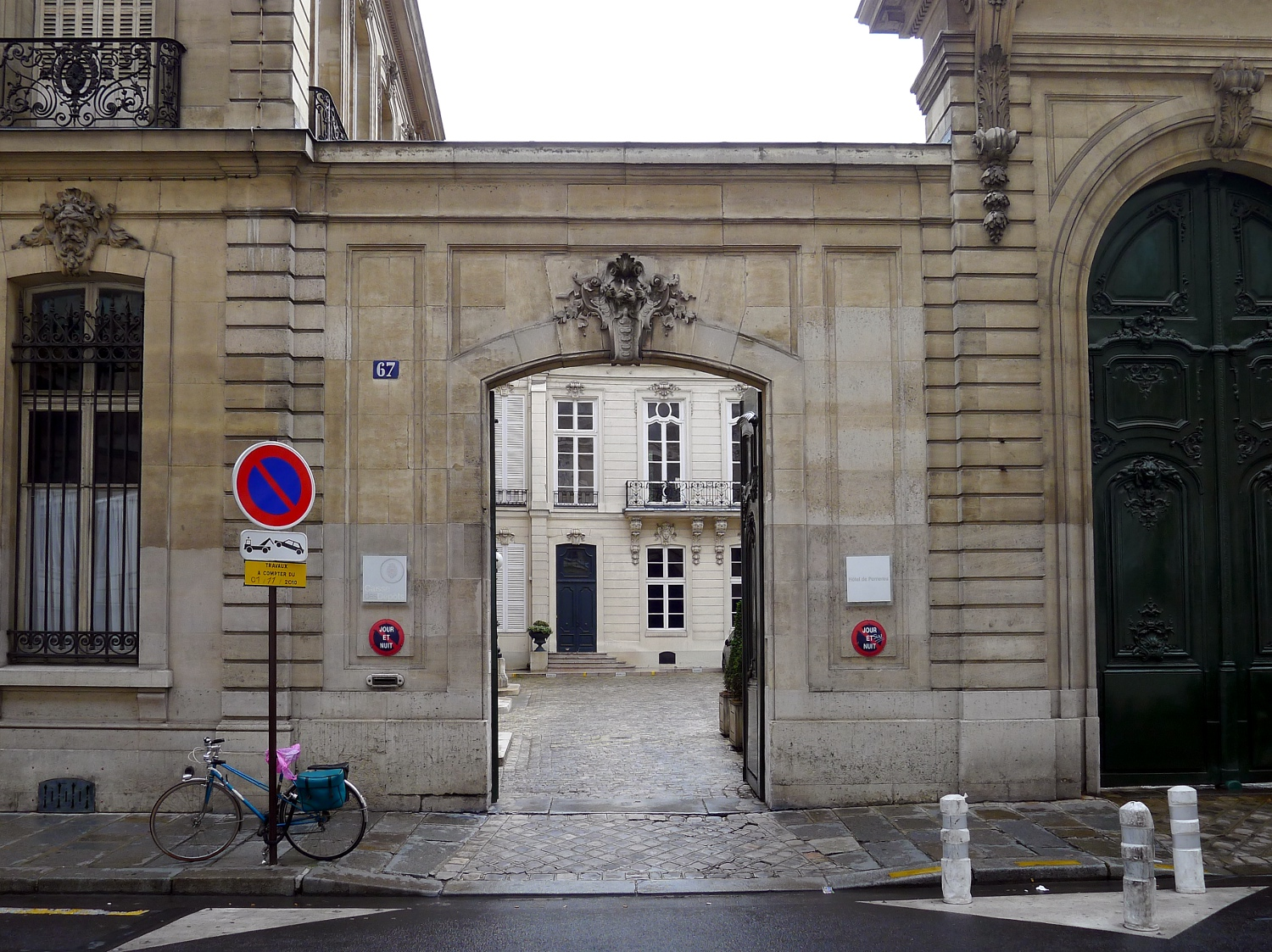
N^{o}. 67: entrance to Hôtel de Pomereu (CDC).
- N^{o}. 63: Hôtel de Maillebois, burnt down during the Commune. The remains were incorporated into the Hôtel de Pomereu.
- N^{o}. 67: Hôtel Duret, built for President François Duret and incorporated into the Hôtel de Pomereu.
- N^{os}. 63–67 (and 10, rue de Poitiers): Hôtel de Pomereu, built in 1872–1874 by David de Pénanrun for Marquis Armand de Pomereu d'Aligre in the Louis XV style, replacing two 18th-century mansions of which only fragments remain: the Hôtel Duret (67, rue de Lille), already owned by the commissioning owner, and the Hôtel de Maillebois (n^{o} 63), which he bought in 1871 after the fires set in the district by the Communards. In 1941, it became the headquarters of the École Nationale des Sciences Géographiques, and in 1947 was acquired by the Caisse des Dépôts et Consignations as a residence for its General Manager. Today, it houses offices and reception rooms.
- N^{o}. 64: Hôtel de Salm, or Palais de la Légion d'Honneur.
- N^{o}. 69: Paris address of Stendhal in 1804, 1806, and 1807, and of Daisy Fellowes.

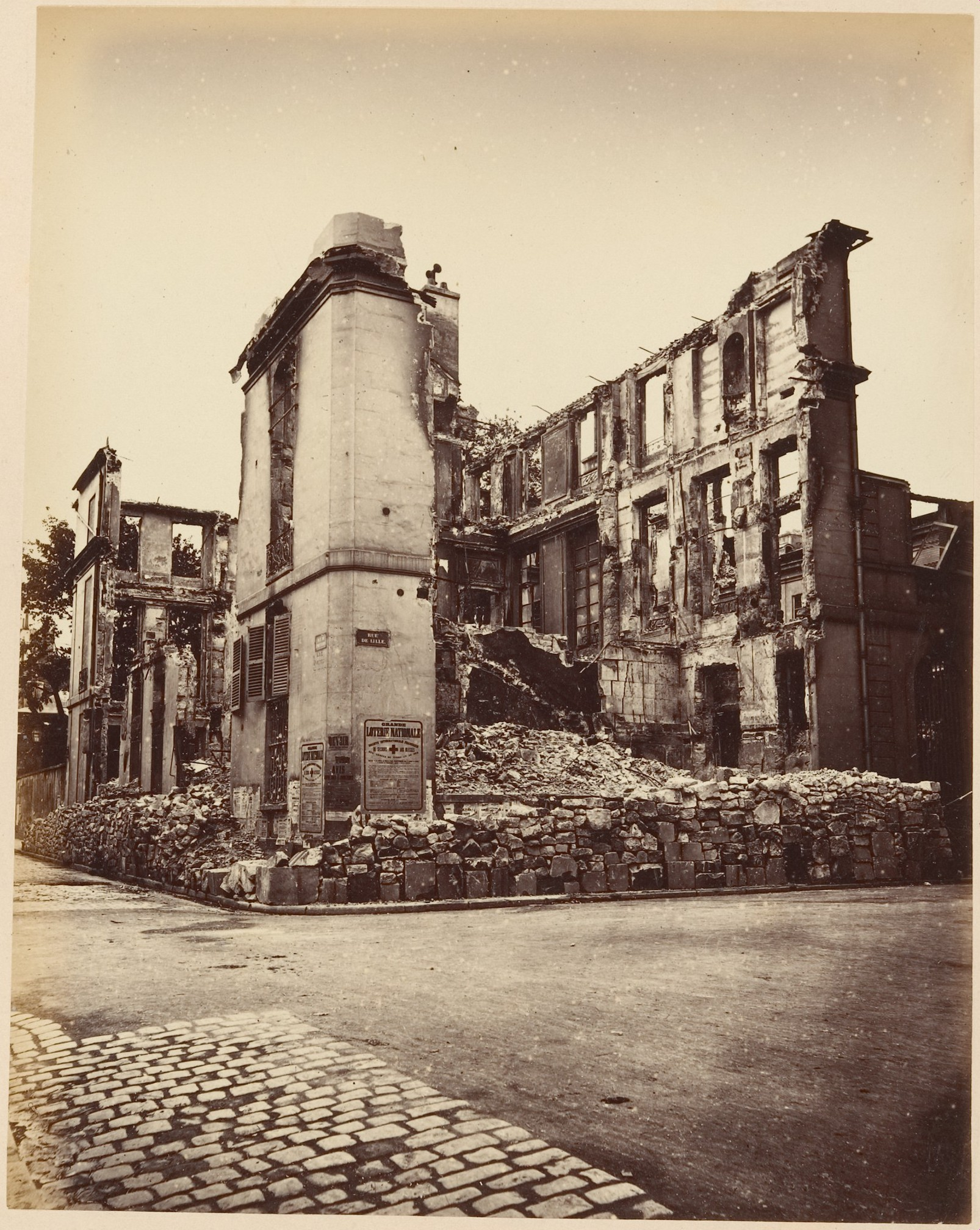
Buildings destroyed in 1870–1871.

- When the Rue de Solférino was built:
  - Two houses built in 1777 for master carpenter Jean Desjardins by architect Jean-Baptiste Louis Élisabeth Le Boursier, including a mansion rented to Jacques Stuart, Grand Admiral of Jamaica, and later to the Duke of Berwick;
  - N^{o}. 72: Twin mansions built in 1784 by architect Antoine-Charles Aubert for Claude-Louis, Marquis de Saisseval, captain of dragoons and real estate speculator, a friend of Charles-Maurice de Talleyrand-Périgord, and his father-in-law, M. du Roure, between rue de Bourbon and quai d'Orsay. The design featured two symmetrical carriage entrance gates on rue de Bourbon, and a single facade facing the Seine, decorated with a colossal order. During the French Revolution, the Hôtel de Saisseval housed the rehearsals for the Fête de la Fédération mass shortly before 14 July 1790: Talleyrand, called upon by the King to celebrate the mass despite his unfamiliarity with the rite, rehearsed it for several days in front of a fireplace in the Hôtel de Saisseval, aided in part by Mirabeau, at times joyously parodying the service.
- N^{o}. 71: Boniface de Castellane (1867–1932) lived in this house between 1918 and 1921.
- N^{o}. 75: Hôtel de Lannion, at the far end of the plot, built in 1742–1744 for Jean Charles Hocquart, by architect Jean Damun; it is similar to the adjoining mansion at 78, rue de l'Université, built for the same client. The two mansions face each other across their adjoining gardens. The mansion was initially leased for life to the Count of Lannion, a peer of Brittany. From 1774, it housed many tenants, including the Comte de Vaudreuil, a friend of Queen Marie-Antoinette, from 1782 to 1786. It then belonged to the Daru sisters, whose family owned the mansion bearing their name at 79, rue de Bourbon. The youngest sister, Mme Faget de Baure, rented the mansion to the Countess de Boigne, who held a salon there during the Restoration. Burnt down during the Commune, the main building on the street and the porte cochère were replaced by a building erected in 1898 by Frédéric Honoré. On the garden side, the mansion has a three-sided central projection adorned with four Ionic pilasters at the second-floor level. The courtyard counterpart was destroyed during the Commune.
  - The last owners of the Hôtel de Lannion were, successively, the collector Hubert Guerrand-Hermès, who died in 2016, then the American Tony Fadell, creator of the iPod, who bought it in 2019 for 34 million euros, and finally the Frenchwoman Valérie Taupin, founder of Teoxane laboratories, who bought it in autumn 2022 for nearly 48 million euros.
- N^{o}. 77: At the far end of the courtyard, a private mansion inhabited in the first half of the 20th century by Baron Napoléon Gourgaud (1881–1944) and the Baroness, born Eva Gebhard (1876–1959), daughter of a wealthy American banker whom he married in 1917. They had amassed an exceptional collection of Impressionist and modern paintings (a significant part of which was donated by Baroness Gourgaud to the Musée National d'Art Moderne), as well as objets d'art. The portrait of Baroness Gourgaud was painted in 1923 by Marie Laurencin (Paris, Centre Georges-Pompidou collection).
- N^{o}. 78: Hôtel Beauharnais (formerly Hôtel de Torcy), built by Germain Boffrand on land he bought in 1713 and sold to Jean-Baptiste Colbert de Torcy during construction. Purchased in 1803 by Prince Eugène de Beauharnais, who had an Egyptian-style porch built over the courtyard (1807) and an exceptional Empire-style interior designed. Acquired in 1817 by Prussia, which set up its embassy here, it later became the German embassy. It was here, on the morning of 7 November 1938, that Herschel Grynszpan assassinated the embassy's third counselor, Ernst vom Rath. The embassy remained here until the end of World War II; today, the mansion houses only the German ambassador's residence.
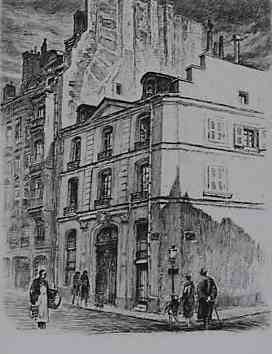
- Hôtel Daru, 79, rue de Lille, engraving by Andor Szekely von Doba, 1928.
  N^{o}. 79: Location of the Hôtel Daru, the Paris address of Stendhal, a protégé of the Daru family, in 1800, in a building at the far end of the courtyard.
- N^{o}. 80: Hôtel de Seignelay, similar to n^{o} 78, also built by Germain Boffrand on land he bought in 1713 and sold in 1718 to Count Charles Éléonor Colbert de Seignelay. The interior decor was transformed by Pierre Mouret in the 18th century. Behind the mansion, in the gardens along the Quai Anatole-France, a stele marks the burial place of Marie-Antoinette's last dog, Coco. Home to the Ministry of Trade and Crafts and, since 2012, the Ministry of the Civil Service.
- N^{o}. 81: Before the French Revolution, Lafayette lived here, hosting such luminaries as Americans Benjamin Franklin and Thomas Jefferson.
- N^{o}. 86: From 1959, an apartment in this building housed the weekly Démocratie, founded by Guy Mollet, as well as the headquarters of the Fédération de la gauche démocrate et socialiste (FGDS) (1965–1968) and today the Office universitaire de recherche socialiste (OURS).
- N^{o}. 95:
  - Built in 1907 by architect Pierre Humbert for Countess Begouën;
  - The poet and novelist André Foulon de Vaulx lived in this house, where he died on 18 December 1951.
- N^{o}. 97: Private mansion owned by writer Nicolas Tourgueniev, former State Councillor to the Tsar. A Decembrist, he was sentenced to death in absentia and exiled to France. He bought this property, which is described in his after-death inventory: "[...] comprising a main building with a 37.15-meter frontage and a small main building, garden and courtyard." He had bought the property for 259,065 francs in 1856, including his furniture. His son, the sculptor Pierre-Nicolas Tourgueneff, lived in the house after his father.
- N^{o}. 119: Building housing the offices of former French President Jacques Chirac, made available to him by the French government.
- N^{o}. 121: The Institut néerlandais and the Fondation Custodia are housed in a small 18th-century mansion built between a courtyard and garden, acquired after the Second World War by collector and art historian Frits Lugt (1884–1970). The garden can be seen at 108, rue de l'Université.
- N^{o}. 123: At the corner of rue Aristide-Briand, this building dates from the early 20th century. It housed the German Consulate General in the first decade of the 20th century. Later, it housed the headquarters of the Gaullist party (UNR, then UDR, then RPR) under the Fifth Republic, until 2001. Acquired and completely renovated, it now houses an annex of the French National Assembly, which it faces on the other side of rue Aristide-Briand.

== In art ==
- Escalier au 48, rue de Lille, Edward Hopper, 1906.

== See also ==
- Arrondissements of Paris
- Rue Voltaire, Sceaux
- Rue du Pont-Neuf, Paris
