= Rue de Solférino =

Street in Paris, France

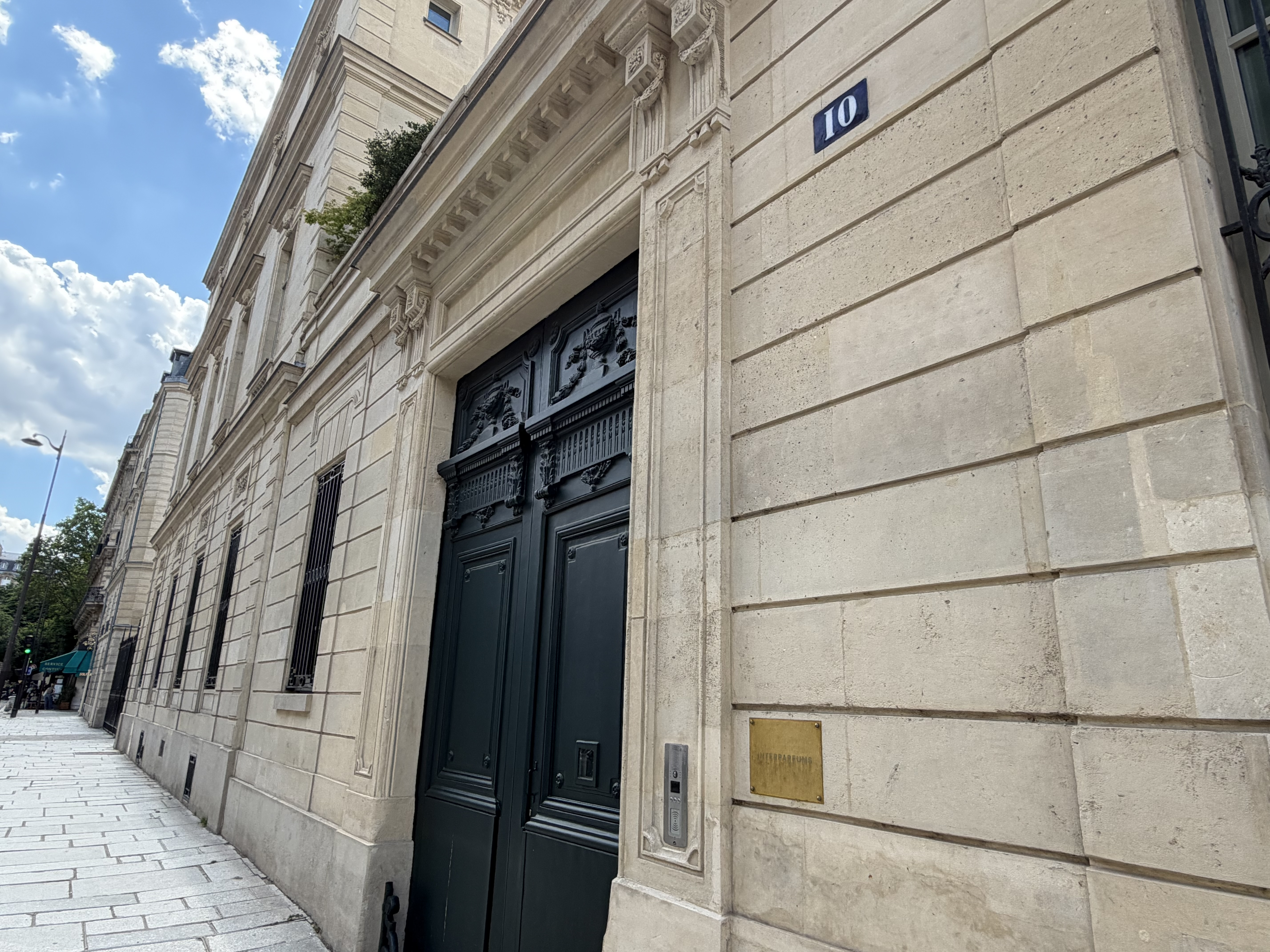
- The seat of the Interparfums, at 10 Rue de Solférino in 2026

- Location within Paris
- Length: 232 m (761 ft)
- Width: 20 m (66 ft)
- Arrondissement: 7th
- Quarter: Invalides
- Coordinates: 48°51′36″N 2°19′24″E
- From: 9 Quai Anatole-France
- To: 260 Boulevard Saint-Germain

Construction
- Completion: 1866
- Denomination: 10 August 1866

The Rue de Solférino (French pronunciation: [ʁy d(ə) sɔlfeʁino]; "Street of Solferino") is a street in the Rive Gauche area of Paris. It was most commonly heard as a reference to the headquarters of the Socialist Party, which were located there until 2018. The street is named after the Battle of Solferino, fought by Napoleon III and Victor Emmanuel II against Francis Joseph of Austria in 1859. The 10 rue de Solférino is the headquarters of Interparfums since 2021.

== Access ==
Located near the Metro stations: Solférino and Musée d'Orsay.
