= Musée d'Orsay station =

Railway station in Paris, France

Musée d'Orsay
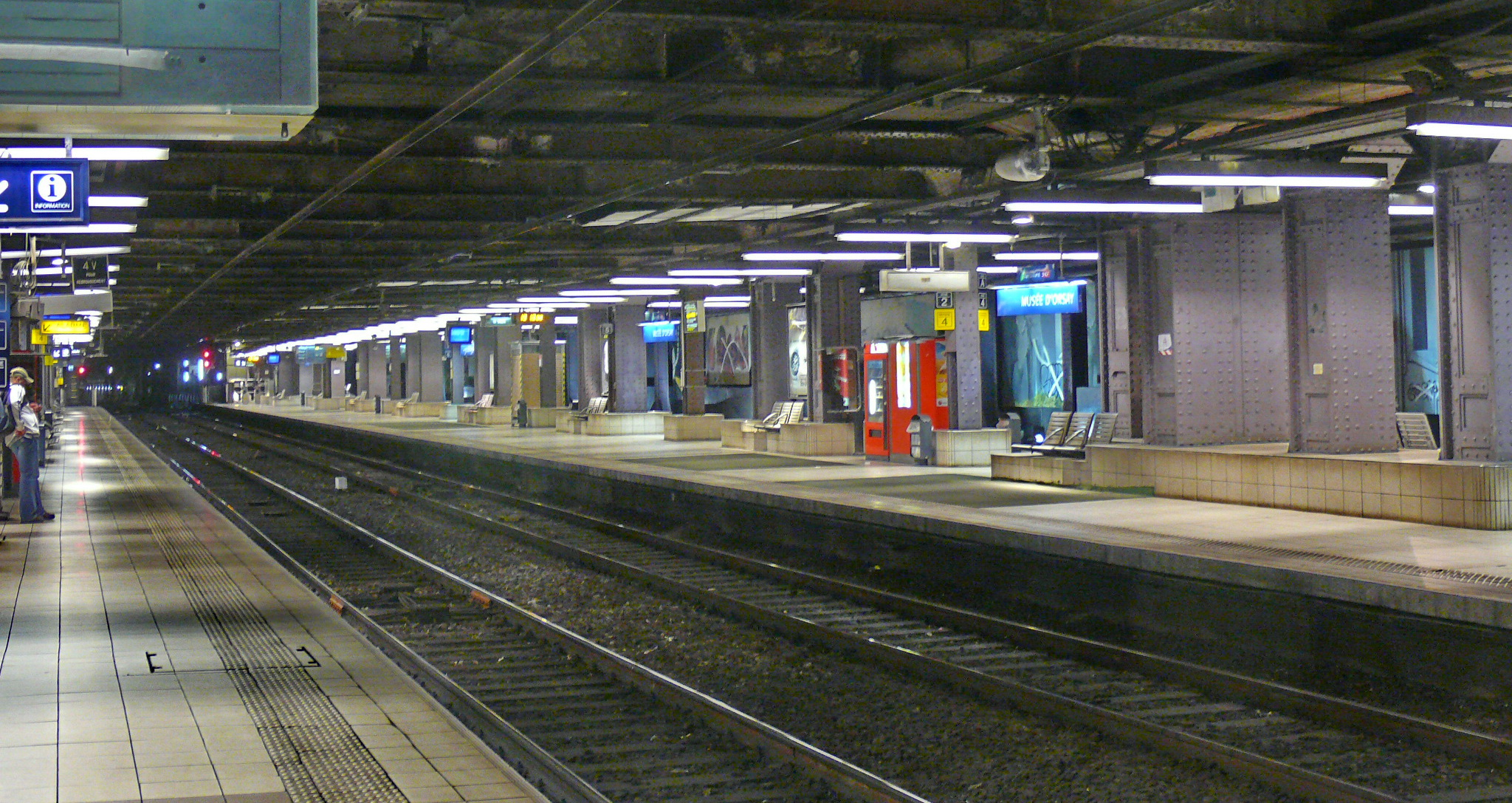
- Platforms

General information
- Location: 7 Quai Anatole-France; 7th arrondissement of Paris, 75007; France
- Coordinates: 48°51′38″N 2°19′32″E
- Elevation: 27 m (89 ft)
- Operator: SNCF
- Connections: RATP Bus: 68 69 73 84 87 94; Tootbus Paris; Noctilien: N01

Construction
- Structure type: Underground
- Accessible: No

Other information
- Station code: 87547307
- Fare zone: 1

History
- Opened: 28 May 1900 (original); 26 September 1979 (underground)
- Former names: Gare d'Orsay

Passengers
- 2024: 4,594,047

Services
Preceding station	RER	Following station
Invalides towards Pontoise, Versailles Château Rive Gauche or Saint-Quentin-en-Yvelines	RER C	Saint-Michel–Notre-Dame towards Massy-Palaiseau, Dourdan-la-Forêt or Saint-Martin-d'Étampes
Location

Musée d'Orsay (French pronunciation: [myze dɔʁsɛ]) is a station in line C of the Paris Region's Réseau Express Régional (RER) rapid transit system, named after the Musée d'Orsay, housed in the former Gare d'Orsay. It is in the 7th arrondissement of Paris, on the Quai Anatole-France. It was one of several stations attacked during the 1995 Paris Métro and RER bombings.

== History ==
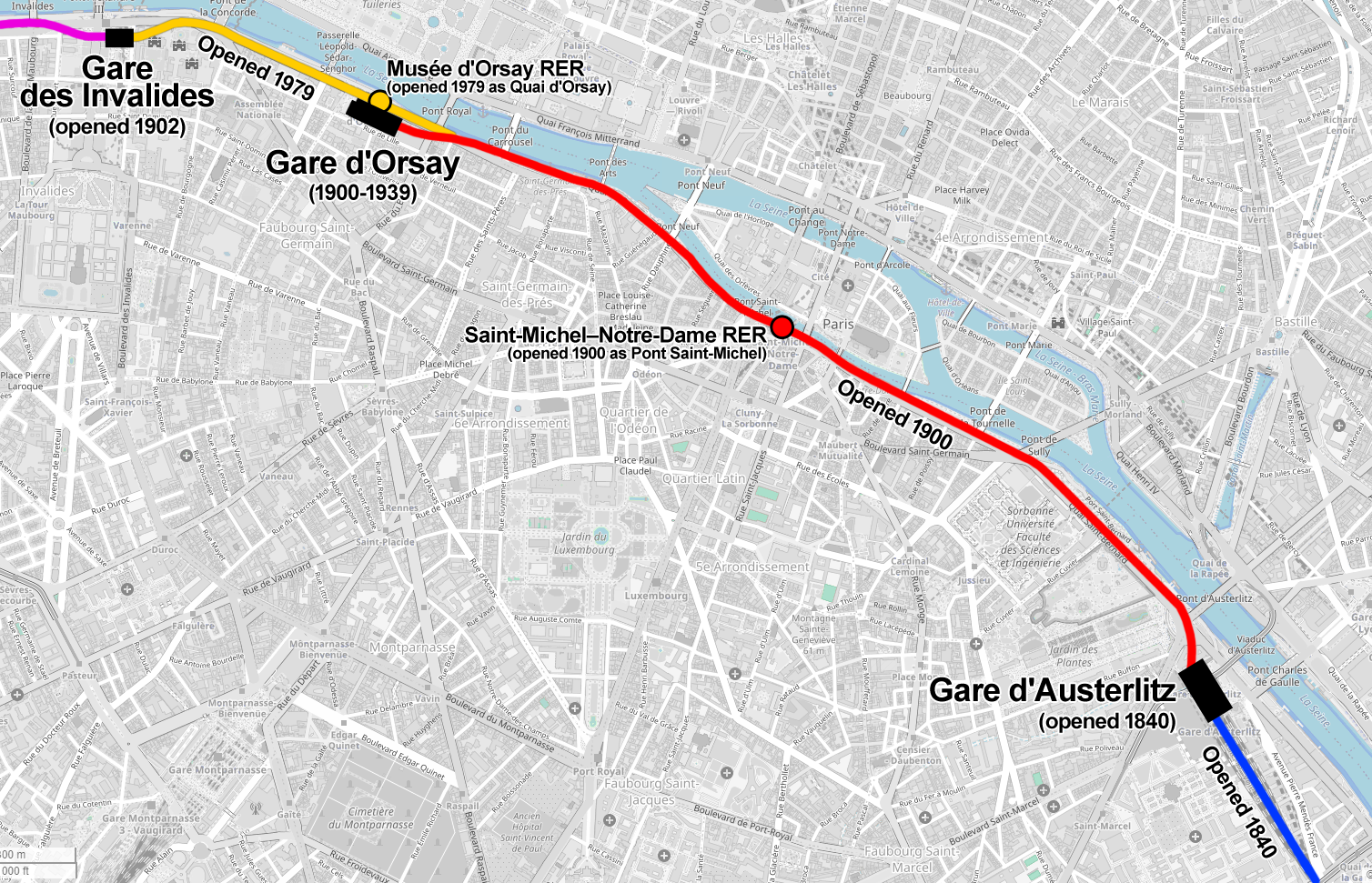
The new railway line extension opened in 1900, linking Gare d'Austerlitz and Gare d'Orsay

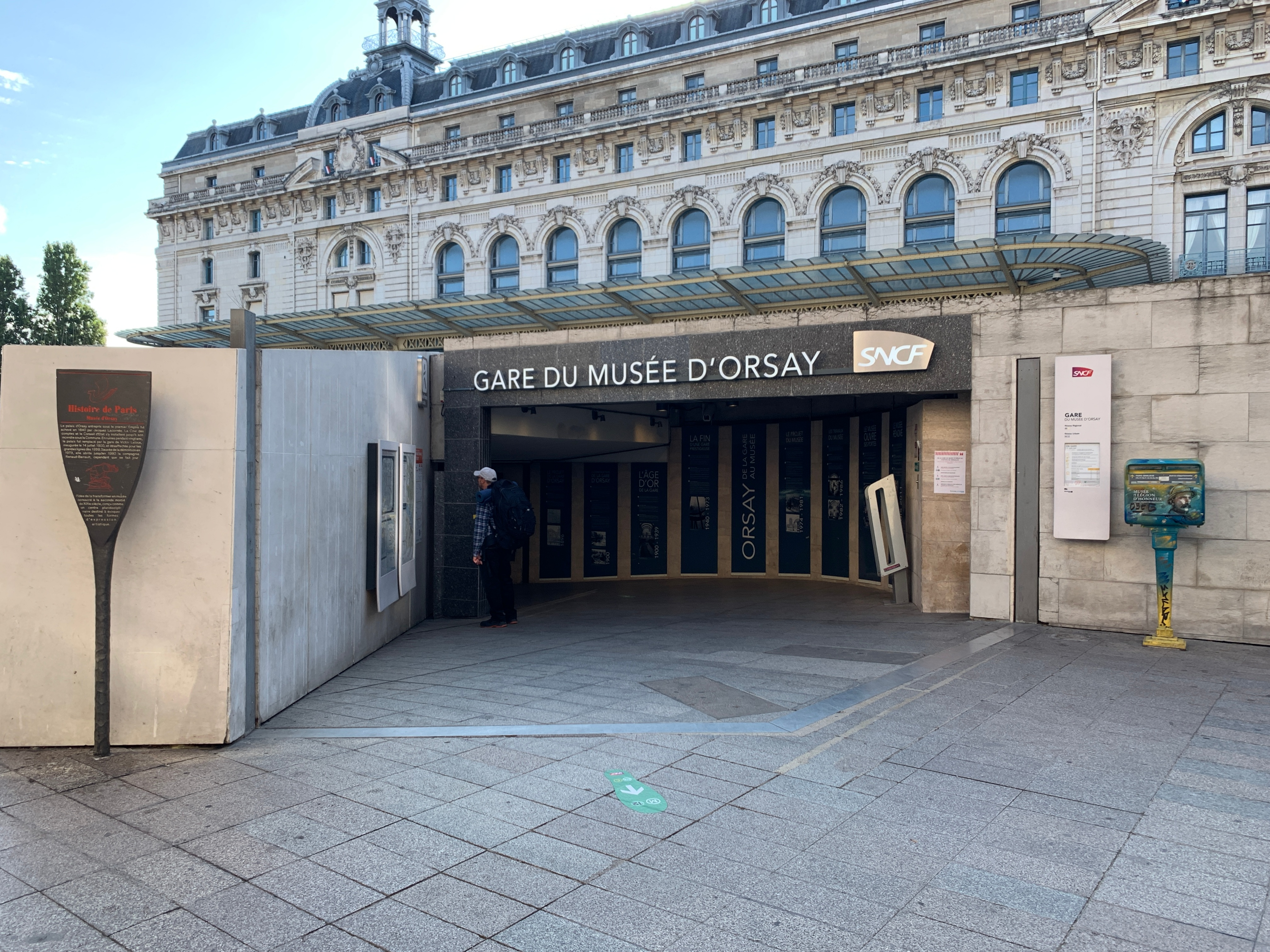
Musée d'Orsay station entrance on Rue Légion Honneur, with the Musée d'Orsay in the background

The Gare d'Orsay was opened in 1900 by the Chemin de Fer de Paris à Orléans (Paris–Orléans Railway, PO) as a mainline railway station for the 1900 Exposition Universelle. It became the PO company's new central terminus station, after the company extended its line from the Gare d'Austerlitz in the 13th arrondissement. The line made use of the new technology at the time, 550 V DC third rail electric traction, and it was constructed in a 1 km (0.62 mi) cut-and-cover tunnel along the left bank of the Seine from Austerlitz to the Quai d'Orsay.

By the late 1930s, SNCF mainline trains had grown too long for the platforms at Gare d'Orsay, and had to terminate at Gare d'Austerlitz. Orsay station fell into disuse and lay derelict for many years. The line was brought back into passenger service when a 1-kilometre (0.62 mi) extension was built in a tunnel along the bank of the Seine, connecting the former PO line to the Gare des Invalides, the terminus of the Rive Gauche line to Versailles. A new Quai d'Orsay underground station was built on the bank of the River Seine, adjacent to the old Orsay terminal station. The new link opened as the Transversal Rive Gauche on 26 September 1979, and today this forms the central section of the RER Line C. On the opening of the Musée d'Orsay in the former Gare d'Orsay station in 1986, Quai d'Orsay station was renamed after the museum.

On 17 October 1995, Musée d'Orsay station was subjected to a terrorist attack during the 1995 France bombings, when a gas bottle exploded between Musée d'Orsay and Saint-Michel–Notre-Dame station, wounding 29 people.

== Adjacent stations ==
Assemblée Nationale and Solférino on Paris Métro Line 12 are both within walking distance.

== See also ==
- List of stations of the Paris Métro
- Gare d'Orsay
