= Rue du Bac station =

Metro station in Paris, France

Rue du Bac
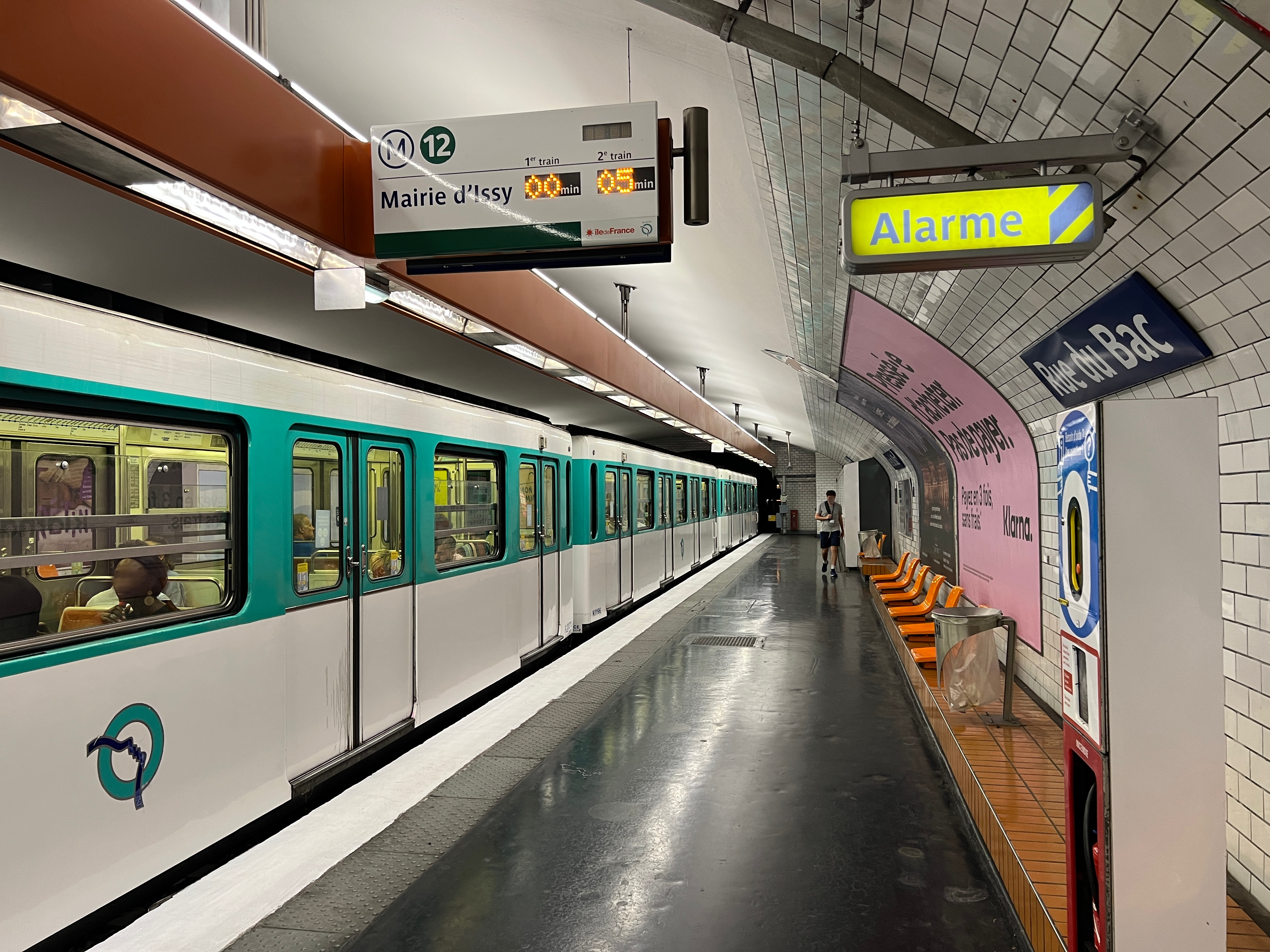
- MF 67 at Rue du Bac

General information
- Location: 7th arrondissement of Paris; Île-de-France; France
- Coordinates: 48°51′20″N 2°19′32″E
- System: Paris Métro station
- Owner: RATP
- Operator: RATP
- Line: Paris Metro Paris Metro Line 12
- Platforms: 2 (side platforms)
- Tracks: 2

Construction
- Accessible: no

Other information
- Station code: 0210
- Fare zone: 1

History
- Opened: 5 November 1910

Passengers
- 1,423,364 (2021)

Services
Preceding station	Paris Metro	Following station
Sèvres–Babylone towards Mairie d'Issy	Line 12	Solférino towards Mairie d'Aubervilliers
Location
- Location within Paris

Rue du Bac (French pronunciation: [ʁy dy bak]) is a station on Line 12 of the Paris Métro in the 7th arrondissement. It is named after the nearby Rue du Bac, a street leading to a ferry (bac) across the Seine used in 1564 during the construction of the Tuileries Palace.

== History ==
The station opened on 5 November 1910 as part of the original section of the Nord-Sud Company's line A between Porte de Versailles and Notre-Dame-de-Lorette. On 27 March 1931, line A became line 12 when It was taken over by the Compagnie du chemin de fer métropolitain de Paris (CMP), incorporating it into the Paris Métro.

On 24 February 2011, a cultural panel in memory of the poet and resistance fighter René Char (1907–1988) was placed on the platform towards Mairie d'Issy. The station was chosen for the installation of the panel as a nearby public square, Place René-Char, was already named after him on the centenary of his birth in 2007.

In 2019, the station was used by 2,304,665 passengers, making it the 225th busiest of the Métro network out of 302 stations.

In 2020, the station was used by 916,367 passengers amidst the COVID-19 pandemic, making it the 252nd busiest of the Métro network out of 304 stations.

In 2021, the station was used by 1,423,364 passengers, making it the 241st busiest of the Métro network out of 304 stations.

== Passenger services ==
=== Access ===
The station has a single access at Boulevard Raspail.

=== Station layout ===
Street Level
B1	Mezzanine
Platform level	Side platform, doors will open on the right
Platform level	Southbound	← toward Mairie d'Issy (Sèvres – Babylone)
Platform level	Northbound	toward Mairie d'Aubervilliers (Solférino) →
Platform level	Side platform, doors will open on the right

=== Platforms ===
The station has a standard configuration with 2 tracks surrounded by 2 side platforms. The lower portion of the side walls are vertical instead of elliptical, as were the other stations constructed by the Nord-Sud company (today on Lines 12 and 13).

=== Other connections ===
The station is also served by lines 63, 68, 69, 83, 84, 87, and 94 of the RATP bus network.

== Nearby ==
Sites of interest nearby include:

- Hôtel de Matignon, the official residence of the Prime Minister of France
- Maison de Verre, a house built between 1928 and 1932 in an early modern style
- Musée Maillol, an art museum
- Hôtel d'Avaray, the official residence of the Dutch ambassador in Paris

== Gallery ==
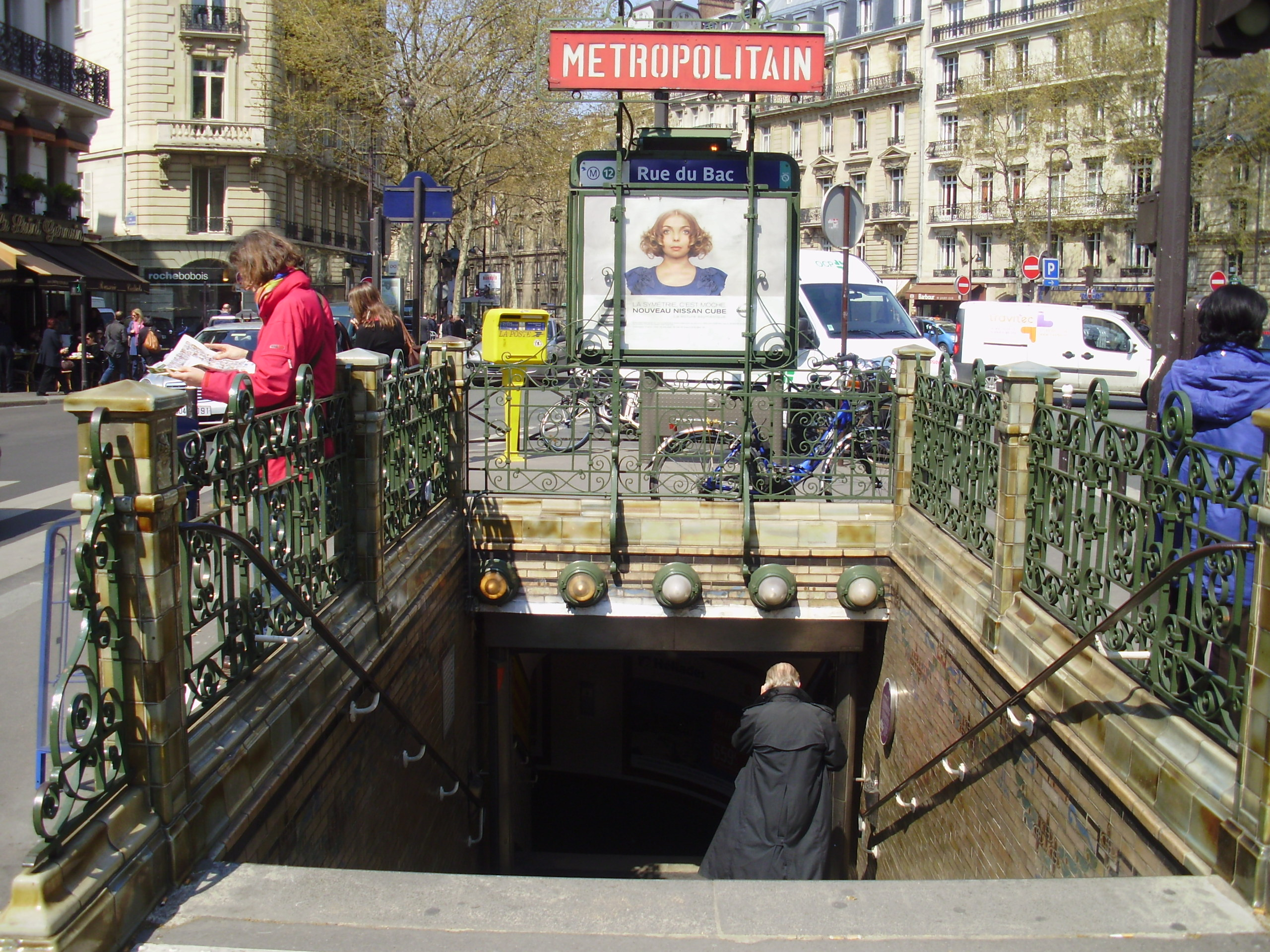
Access

== Sources ==
- Roland, Gérard (2003). Stations de métro. D’Abbesses à Wagram. Éditions Bonneton.
