= Solférino station =

Station of the Paris Métro

Solférino Musée d'Orsay
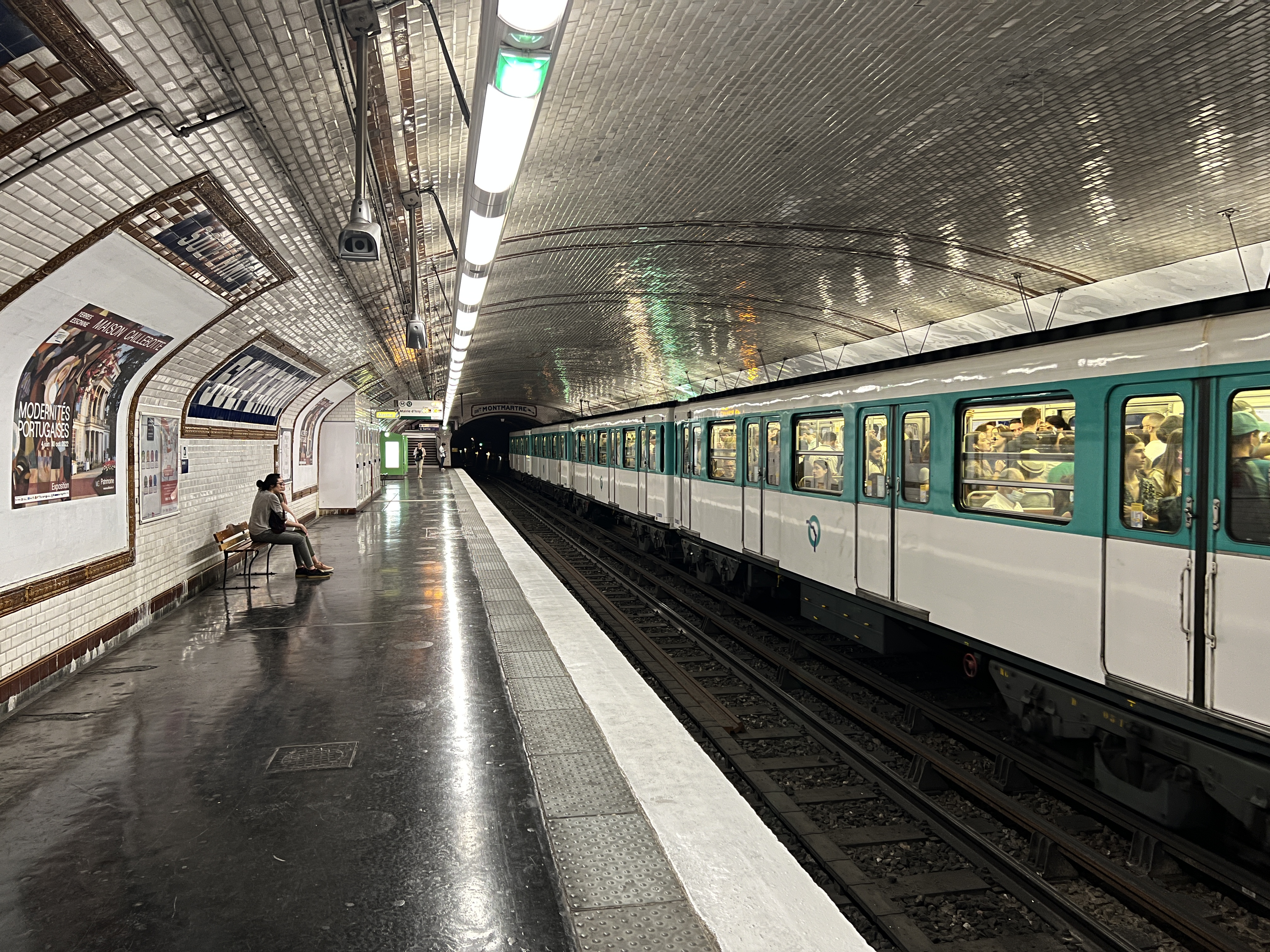
- MF 67 at Solférino

General information
- Location: 7th arrondissement of Paris; Île-de-France; France
- Coordinates: 48°51′30″N 2°19′24″E
- System: Paris Métro station
- Owner: RATP
- Operator: RATP
- Line: Paris Metro Paris Metro Line 12
- Platforms: 2 (side platforms)
- Tracks: 2

Construction
- Accessible: no

Other information
- Station code: 1014
- Fare zone: 1

History
- Opened: 5 November 1910

Passengers
- 1,269,143 (2021)

Services
Preceding station	Paris Metro	Following station
Rue du Bac towards Mairie d'Issy	Line 12	Assemblée Nationale towards Mairie d'Aubervilliers
Location
- Location within Paris

Solférino ([sɔlfeʁino]) is a station on Line 12 of the Paris Métro in the 7th arrondissement. Located under Boulevard Saint-Germain, it is named after the nearby Rue de Solférino, which in turn was named after the Battle of Solferino, fought in 1859 during the Second Italian War of Independence, where the Franco-Piedmontese troops commanded by Napoleon III defeated the Austrians. The street also gave its name to Passerelle Solférino to the north, a footbridge over the Seine, now known as Passerelle Léopold-Sédar-Senghor.

== History ==
The station opened on 5 November 1910 as part of the original section of the Nord-Sud Company's line A between Porte de Versailles and Notre-Dame-de-Lorette. On 27 March 1931, line A became line 12 when the Nord-Sud was taken over by the Compagnie du chemin de fer métropolitain de Paris (CMP), incorporating it into the Paris Métro.

From the late 1930s to the early 1970s the station was subtitled "Gare d'Orsay" after the SNCF station 350 meters to the north. The subtitle never appeared on the station platforms, because the Nord-Sud designers used porcelain tiles for the station names.

The station was featured in a brief scene in an advertisement by Givenchy starring Rooney Mara for its perfume L'Interdit in 2018 at the staircase at access 1, although it was mainly shot at the Porte des Lilas - Cinéma ghost station.

In 2019, the station was used by 2,073,832 passengers, making it the 240th busiest of the Métro network out of 302 stations.

In 2020, the station was used by 923,536 passengers amidst the COVID-19 pandemic, making it the 250th busiest of the Métro network out of 304 stations.

In 2021, the station was used by 1,269,143 passengers, making it the 254th busiest of the Métro network out of 304 stations.

== Passenger services ==
=== Access ===
The statio has three accesses:

- Access 1: place Jacques Bainville
- Access 2: rue de Bellechasse Musée d'Orsay (an ascending escalator)
- Access 2: rue Saint-Dominique

=== Station layout ===
Street Level
B1	Mezzanine
Platform level	Side platform, doors will open on the right
Platform level	Southbound	← toward Mairie d'Issy (Rue du Bac)
Platform level	Northbound	toward Mairie d'Aubervilliers (Assemblée Nationale) →
Platform level	Side platform, doors will open on the right

=== Platforms ===
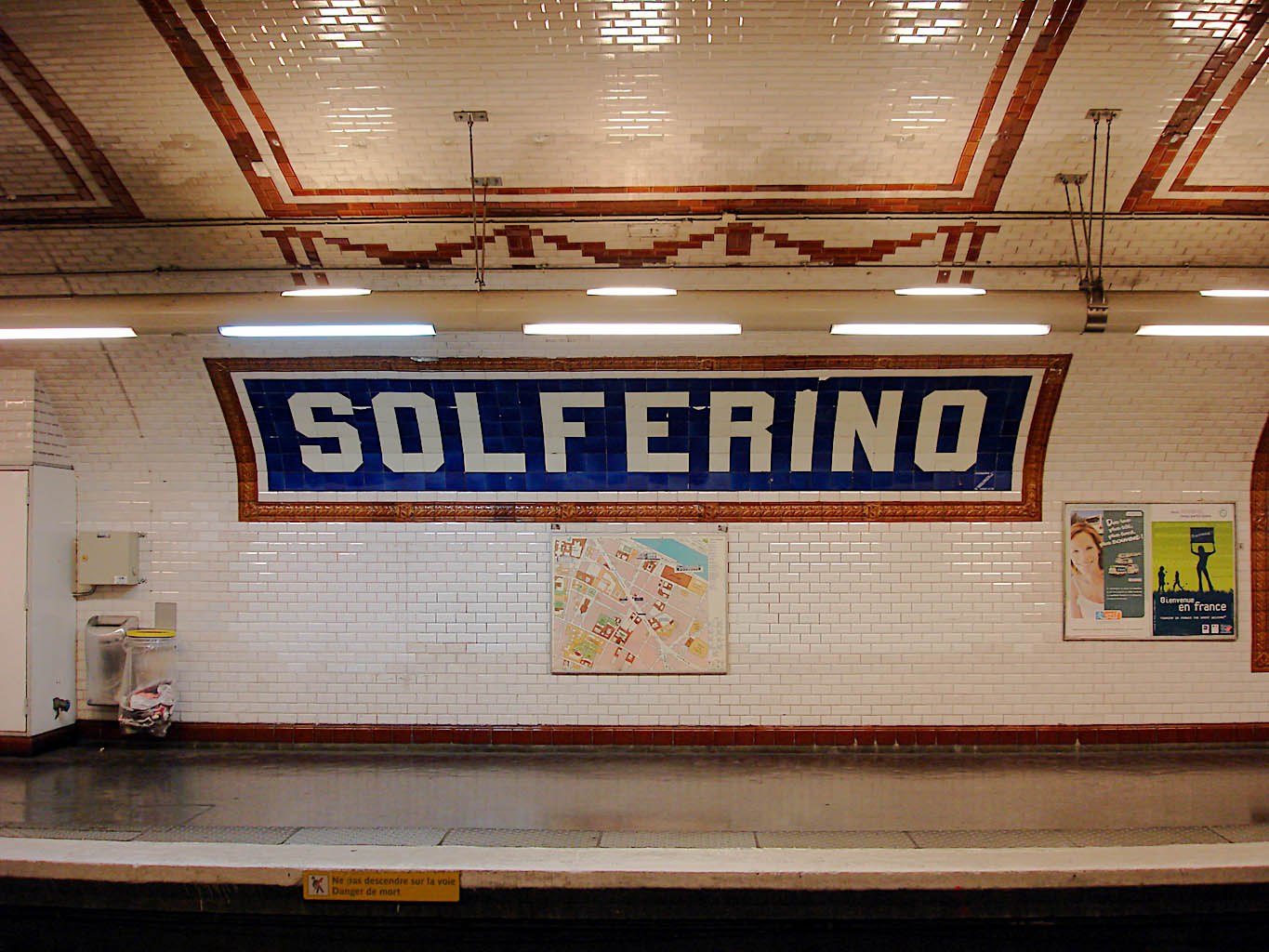
Original station signage

The station has a standard configuration with 2 tracks surrounded by 2 side platforms. The lower portion of the side walls are vertical instead of elliptical, as with the other stations constructed by the Nord-Sud company (today on lines 12 and 13). It is one of the two stations on the line where the original Nord-Sud company style of décor have been maintained with its characteristic large ceramic tablets indicating the name of the station with the other station being Porte de la Chapelle.

=== Other connections ===
It is an out-of-station interchange with the Musée d'Orsay station on line C of the RER located around 250 metres away from the station. It is accessible by walking along rue de Bellechasse towards the north.

The station is also served by line 63, 68, 69, 73, 83, 84, 87, and 94 of the RATP bus network, and at night, by line N02 of the Noctilien bus network.

== Nearby ==
- Mairie du 7^{e} arrondissement
- Musée d'Orsay
- Promenade Édouard Glissant

== Gallery ==
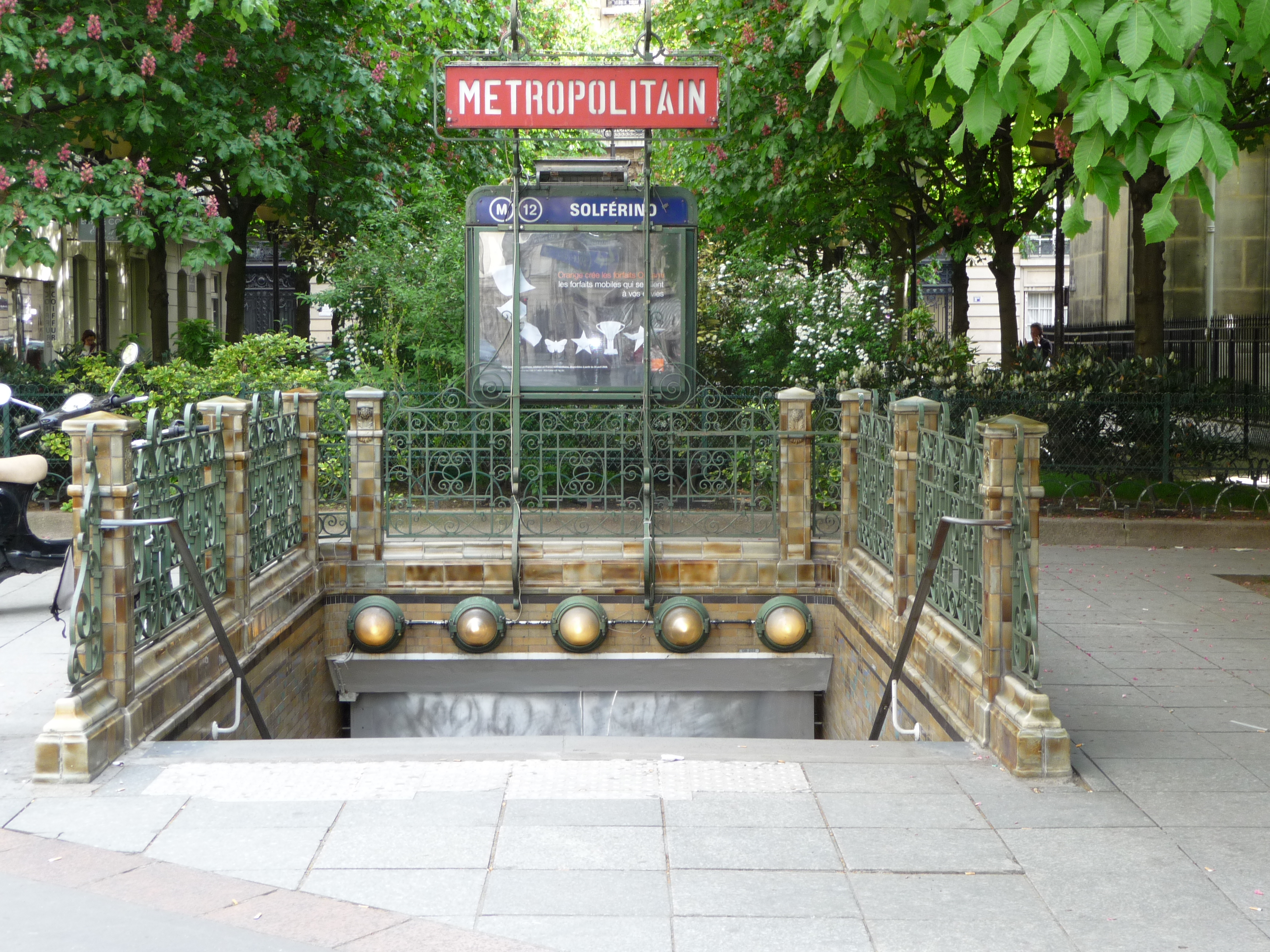
Access 1

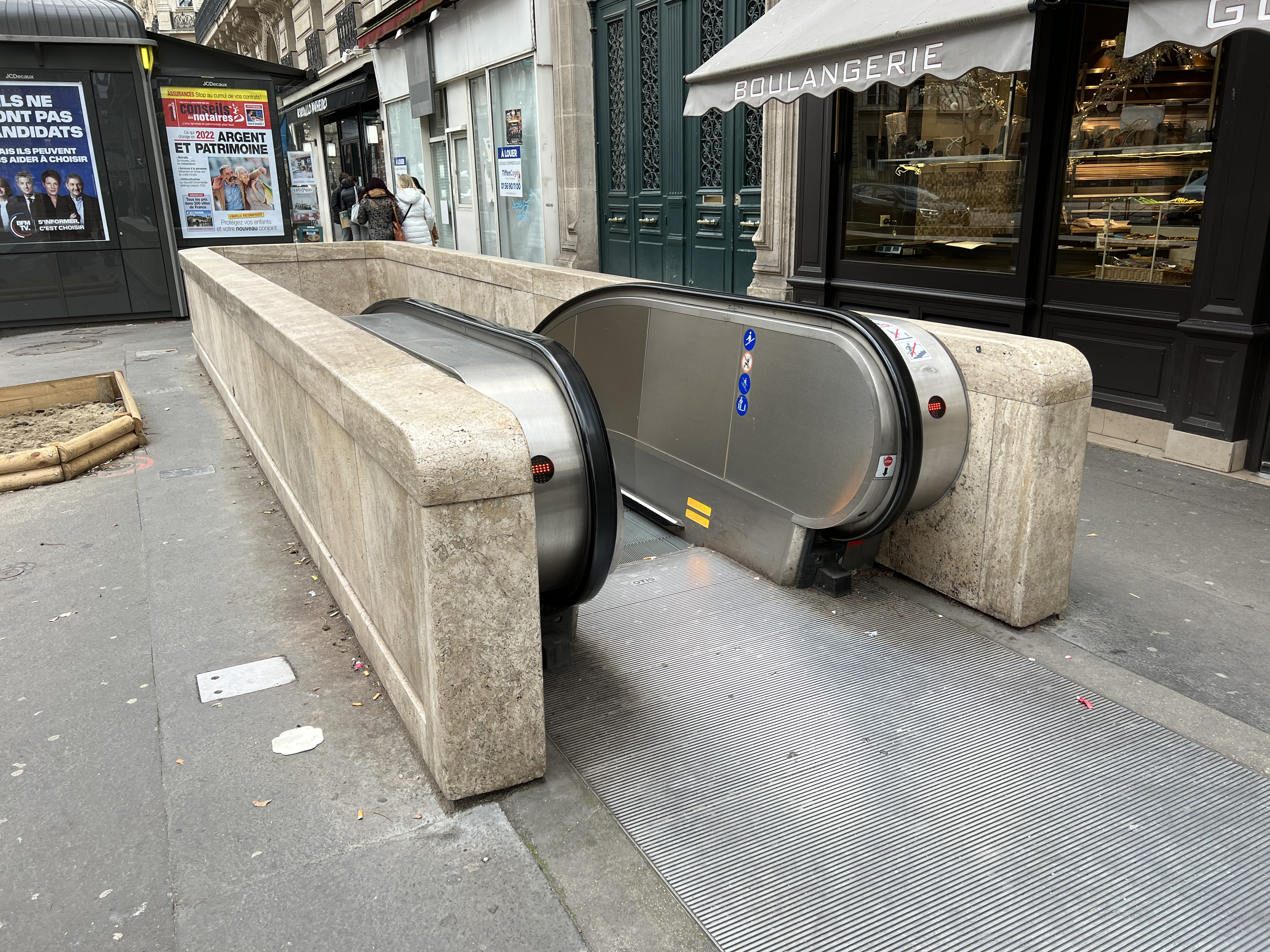
Access 2

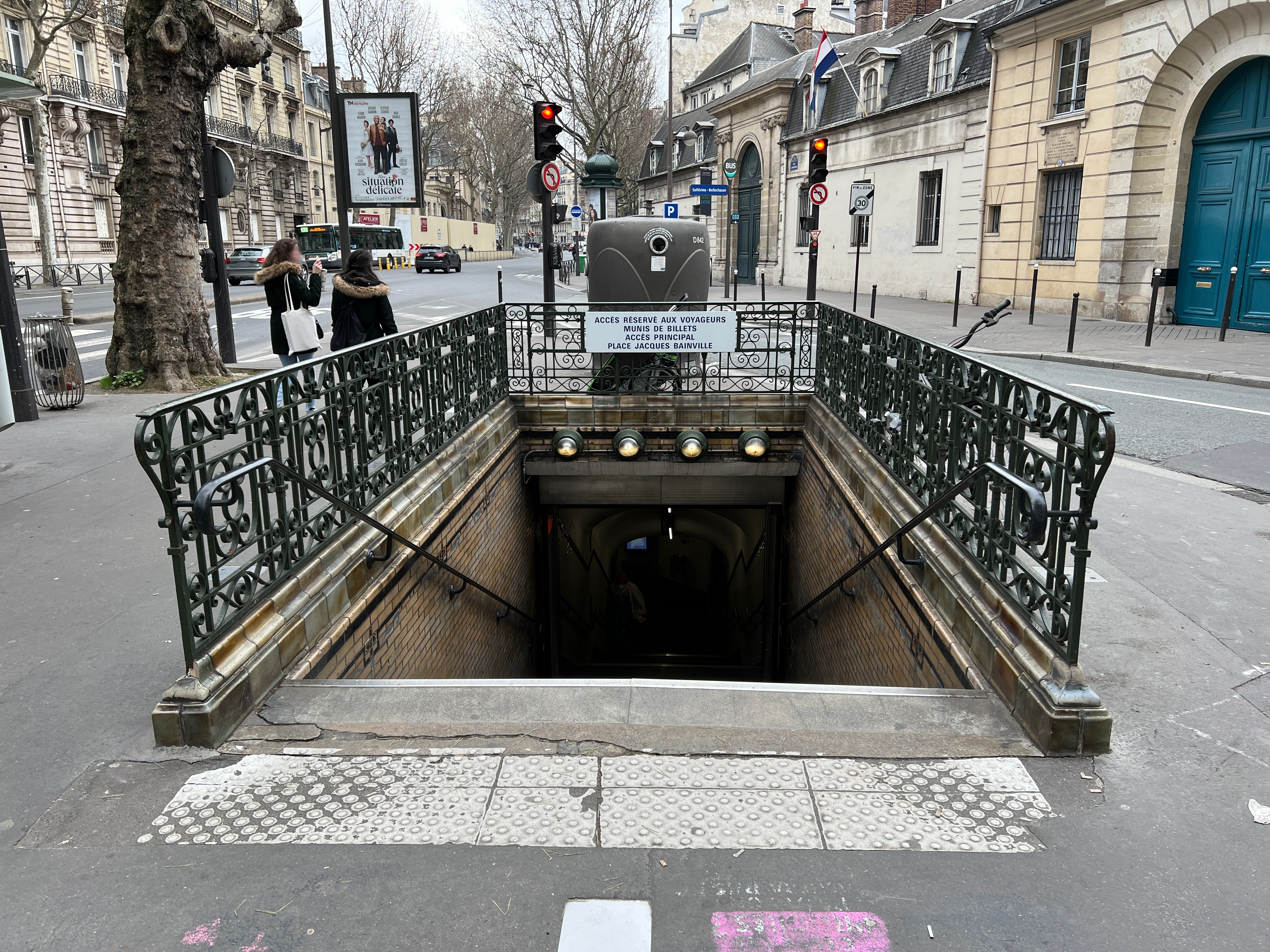
Access 3

== Sources ==
- Roland, Gérard (2003). Stations de métro. D’Abbesses à Wagram. Éditions Bonneton.
