= Assemblée Nationale station =

Paris Métro station

Assemblée nationale
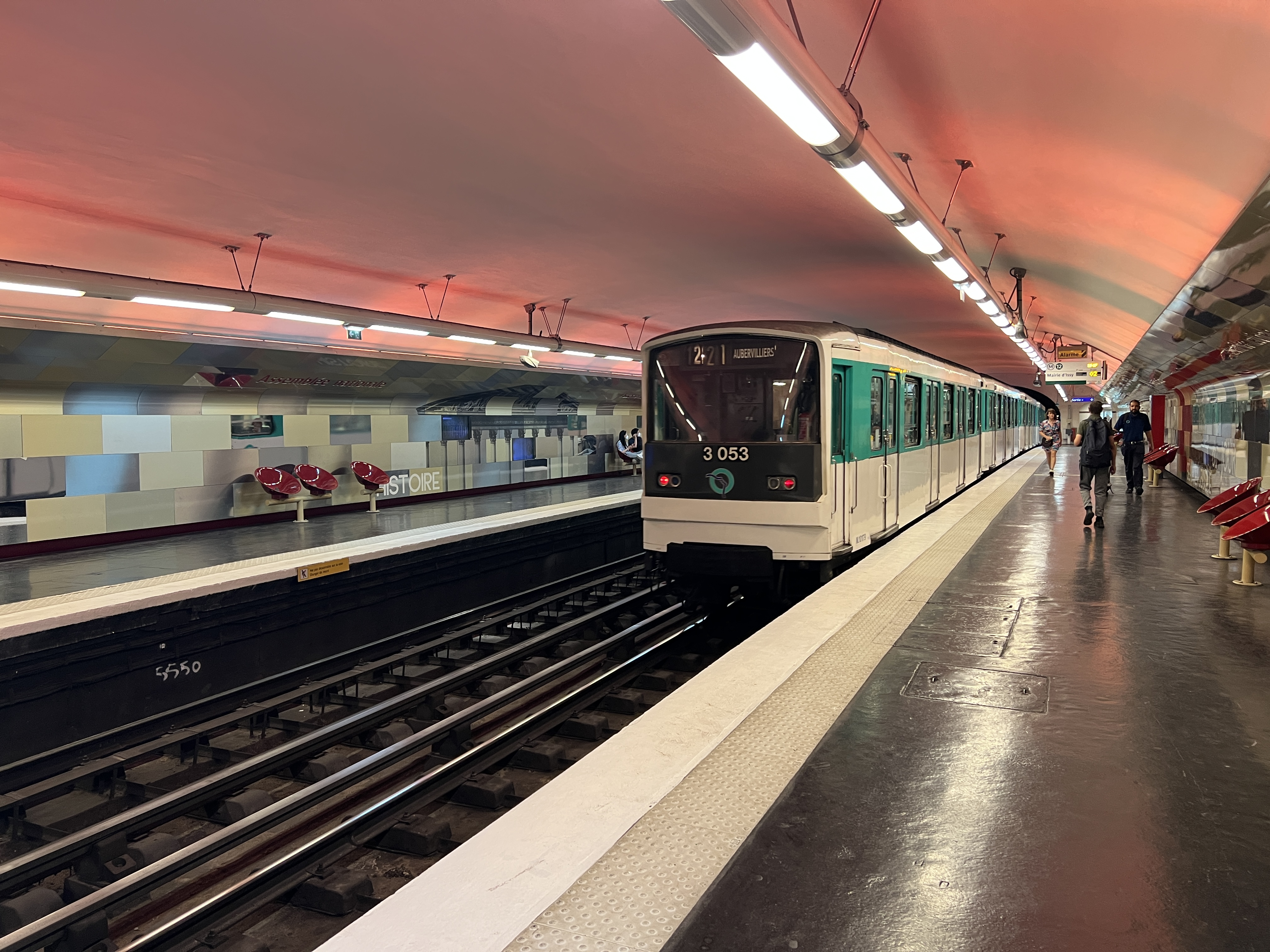
- MF 67 at Assemblée nationale

General information
- Location: 7th arrondissement of Paris; Île-de-France; France
- Coordinates: 48°51′38″N 2°19′16″E
- System: Paris Métro station
- Owner: RATP
- Operator: RATP
- Line: Paris Metro Paris Metro Line 12
- Platforms: 2 (side platforms)
- Tracks: 2

Construction
- Accessible: no

Other information
- Station code: 10-13
- Fare zone: 1

History
- Opened: 5 November 1910
- Former names: Chambre des députés (5 November 1910 – 30 June 1989)

Passengers
- 611,512 (2021)

Services
Preceding station	Paris Metro	Following station
Solférino towards Mairie d'Issy	Line 12	Concorde towards Mairie d'Aubervilliers
Location
- Location within Paris

Assemblée nationale ([asɑ̃ble nɑsjɔnal]; lit. 'National Assembly'), formerly Chambre des députés (1910–1989), is a station on Line 12 of the Paris Métro in the 7th arrondissement. Located under Boulevard Saint-Germain, it is named after the nearby National Assembly.

== History ==
The station opened as Chambre des députés on 5 November 1910 as part of the original section of the Nord-Sud Company's line A between Porte de Versailles and Notre-Dame-de-Lorette. On 27 March 1931, line A became line 12 when It was taken over by its competitor, the Compagnie du chemin de fer métropolitain de Paris (CMP), incorporating it into the Paris Métro. On 1 July 1989, the station was renamed Assemblée nationale, as it is still known today, to be more consistent with the official name of the lower house of the bicameral French Parliament since 1946.

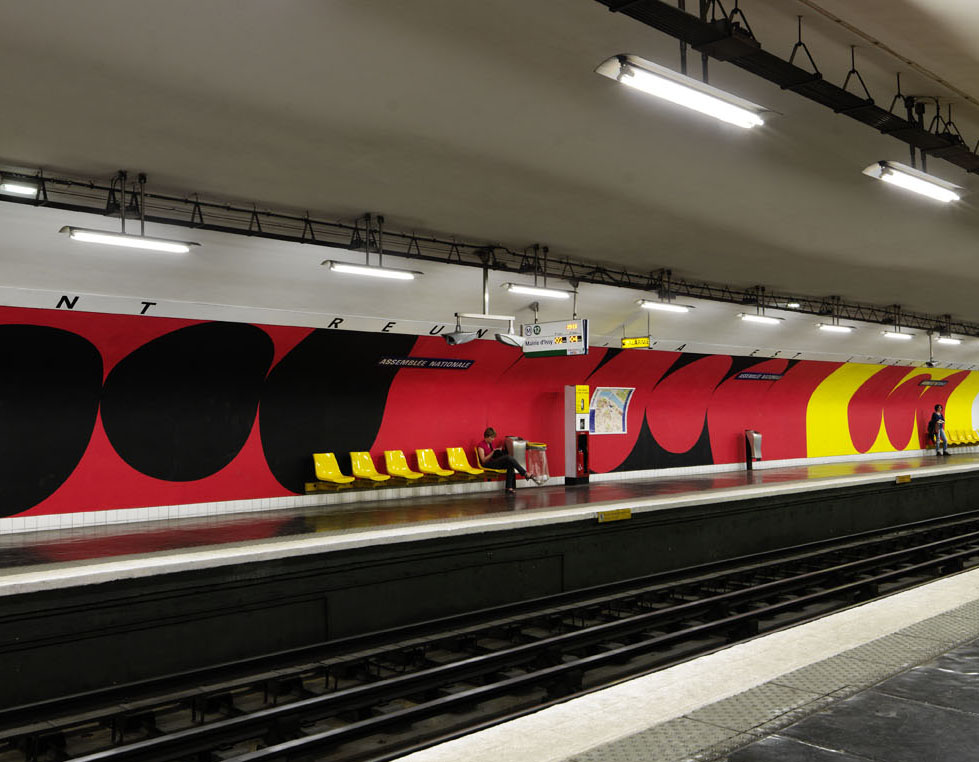
La Chambre double by Jean-Charles Blais in 2011

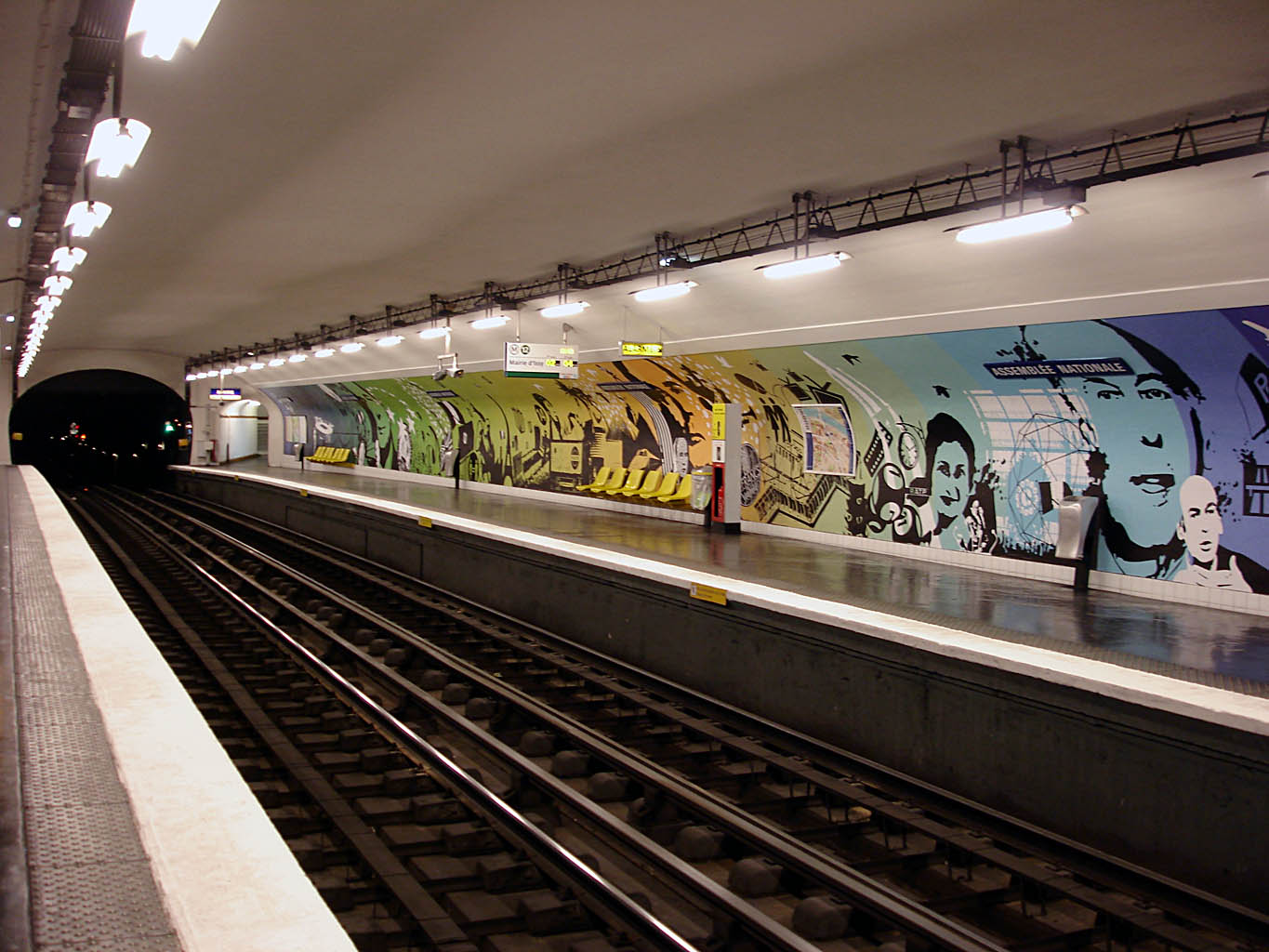
Des Paroles et des Actes

In 1990, the French artist Jean-Charles Blais decorated the platform with posters, made up of a series of large black silhouette heads on a colourful background. They were periodically updated. From 2004-14, the artist was asked to imagine a new series of images for the station's platforms, titled La Chambre double. It was updated every three months as part of the contract with the RATP. This arrangement ended in 2014 when the artist had discovered that the installation had been dismantled back in the autumn of 2013 to make way for a new exhibition that consisted of reproductions of photographs from the Photoquai exhibition. In 2015, the Tribunal de Grande Instance de Paris demanded the RATP to pay the artist 14,000 euros in compensation for putting an end to the display without his authorisation, breaching the contract. In 2008, a temporary exhibition, Des Paroles et des Actes, on the occasion of the 50th anniversary of the Fifth Republic, with the permission of Jean-Charles Blais, was displayed on the platforms for three months. It displayed portraits of the Presidents of the French Republic and main events concerning France and transport.

On 28 September 2016, Claude Bartolone, then the President of the National Assembly, accompanied by Élisabeth Borne, then the President of the RATP, inaugurated the station's new decor. It was designed and produced by a collaboration between Philippe Daney, the architectural firm MiRo, and lighting designer Timothé Toury.

Metal plates on the platform walls illustrates the stone walls of the Palais Bourbon, where the National Assembly meets, with large visuals on it that display images of the meeting chamber, articles of the French constitution, as well as extracts from the Tennis Court Oath. A set of mirrors serves to remind travellers that the Assembly must reflect the will of the people.

It features several themes that provide a contemporary vision of the National Assembly, depicting them through insets into the bodywork on the walls of the platforms such as visuals and videos for travellers to learn more about democracy and to participate more in public debate. When the assembly is in session, a screen broadcasts debates in the meeting chamber or in the committees. A screen on each platform also broadcasts La Chaîne parlementaire (The Parliamentary Channel).

The platform vault features a lighting scheme that changes depending on the time of the day: bluish before dawn, orange in the morning, and calmer during the day, changing continuously mimicking passing clouds in the sky.

In 2019, the station was used by 1,063,551 passengers, making it the 290th busiest of the Métro network out of 302 stations.

In 2020, the station was used by 395,997 passengers amidst the COVID-19 pandemic, making it the 293rd busiest of the Métro network out of 304 stations.

In 2021, the station was used by 611,512 passengers, making it the 295th busiest of the Métro network out of 304 stations.

== Passenger services ==
=== Access ===
The station has three accesses:

- Access 1: Boulevard Saint-Germain Assemblée Nationale
- Access 2: rue de Lille
- Access 3: rue de l'Université

=== Station layout ===
Street Level
B1	Mezzanine
Platform level	Side platform, doors will open on the right
Platform level	Southbound	← toward Mairie d'Issy (Solférino)
Platform level	Northbound	toward Mairie d'Aubervilliers (Concorde) →
Platform level	Side platform, doors will open on the right

=== Platforms ===
The station has a standard configuration with 2 tracks surrounded by 2 side platforms. The lower portion of the side walls are vertical instead of elliptical, as are the other stations constructed by the Nord-Sud company (today on lines 12 and 13).

=== Other connections ===
The station is also served by lines 63, 73, 83, 84, 87, and 94 of the RATP bus network, and at might, by lines N01 and N02 of the Noctilien bus network.

== Nearby ==
The National Assembly, the namesake for the station, which sits at the Palais Bourbon, is nearby. Also nearby is the Hôtel Beauharnais, the residence of the German ambassador in Paris.

== Gallery ==
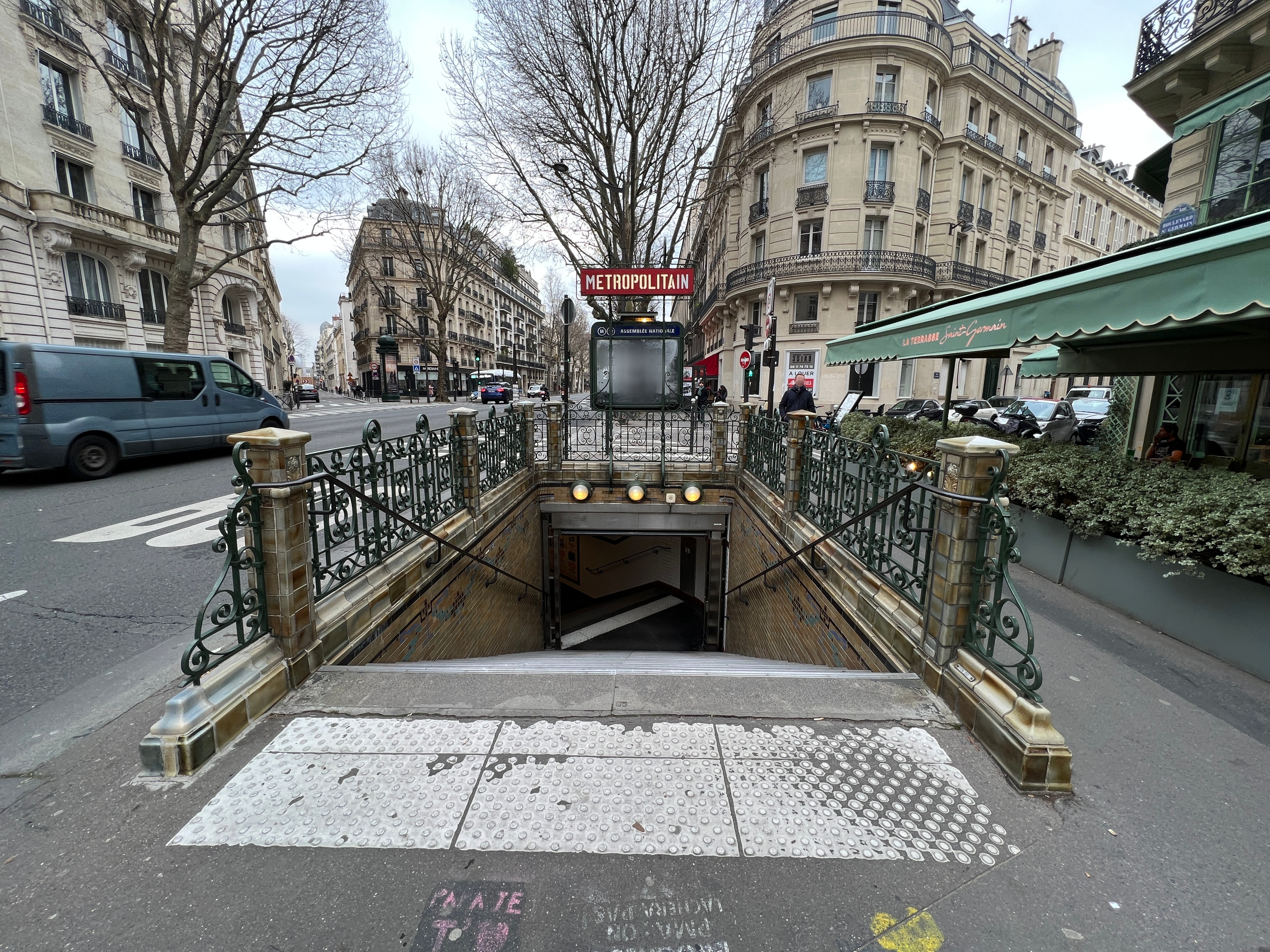
Access 1

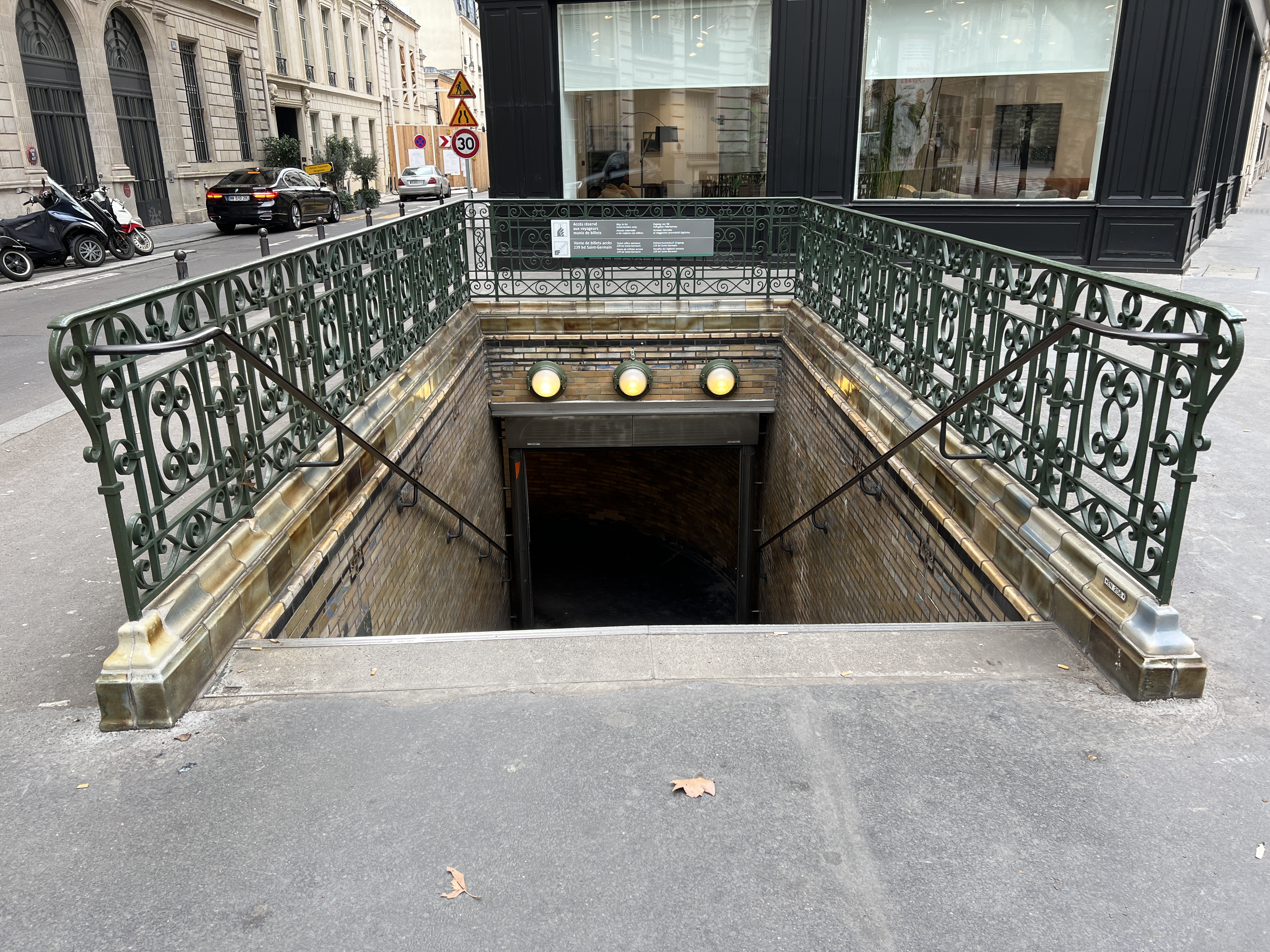
Access 2

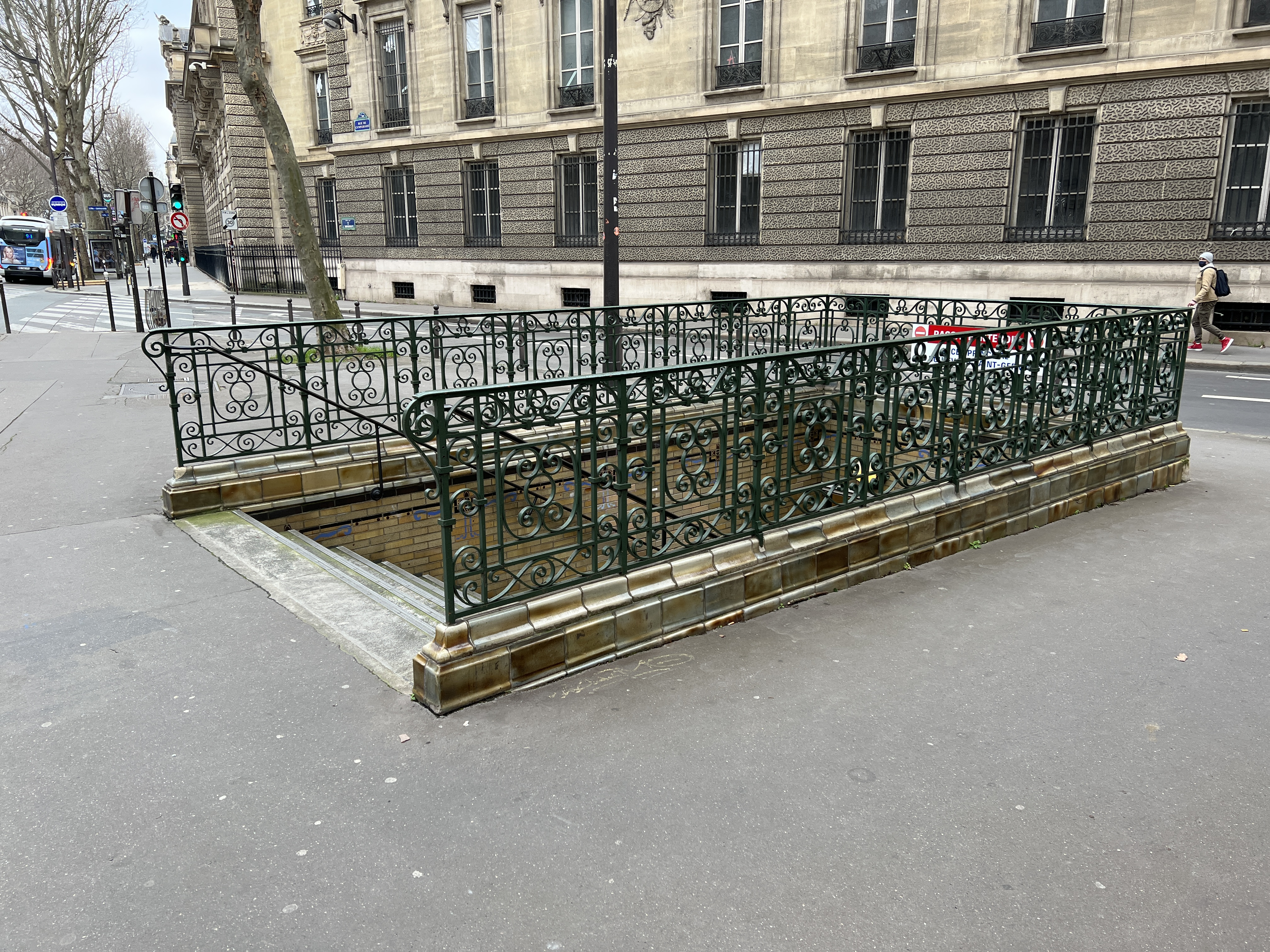
Access 3
