= Quai Anatole-France =

Quay in Paris, France

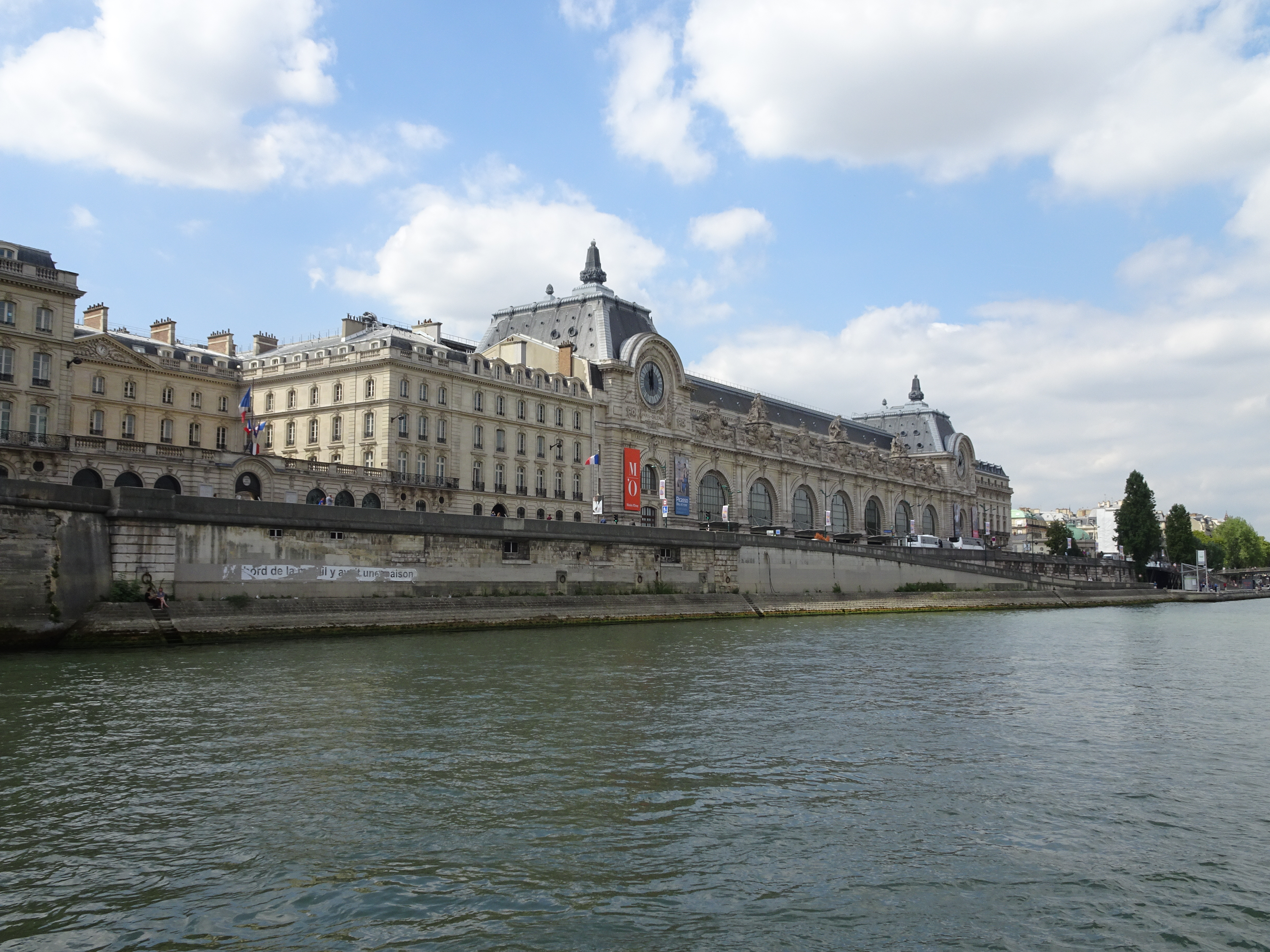
- Gare d'Orsay at the Quai Anatole-France

- Location within Paris
- Former names: Quai de la Grenouillière; Quai d'Orsay; Quai Bonaparte
- Namesake: Anatole France
- Type: Quay
- Length: 585 m (1,919 ft)
- Width: 19.9 m
- Location: Paris
- Arrondissement: 7th arrondissement of Paris
- Quarter: Saint-Thomas-d'Aquin; Invalides
- Coordinates: 48°51′41″N 2°19′24″E
- From: Quai Voltaire
- To: Quai d'Orsay

The Quai Anatole-France (French pronunciation: [kɛ anatɔl fʁɑ̃s]) is a quay on the south bank of the River Seine in the 7th arrondissement of Paris, France.

== Location ==
At 585 meters long, the Quai Anatole-France begins after the Quai Voltaire, at the level of the Rue du Bac, and continues as the Quai d'Orsay, from the Boulevard Saint-Germain and at the level of the Palais Bourbon.

== History ==
The Quai Anatole-France is the eastern part of the Quai d'Orsay, bounded by the Pont Royal and the Pont de la Concorde. It took its current name in 1947. Anatole France was familiar with the quays of Rive Gauche: he had lived at 15, quai Malaquais and his father had run a bookstore at 9, quai Voltaire.

First called the Quai de la Grenouillière by the Council decree of 18 October 1704, it had been renamed the Quai d'Orsay by the decision of the Council of 23 August 1707. It was called the Quai Bonaparte by the decree of the Consuls of 13 Messidor year X, and reverted to the name "Quai d'Orsay" in 1815.

The part of the quay between number 5 and the Rue de Bellechasse was named the Place Henry-de-Montherlant in 1982.

== Buildings and places of interest ==
- Nos 9 bis-11 (and 2-2 bis, rue de Solférino): mansion at the end of the 19th century.
- No 11: campaign seat of Nicolas Dupont-Aignan during the 2012 presidential election.
- No 15: Caisse des dépôts et consignations, formerly owned by the French National Centre for Scientific Research, the building houses part of the services of the Banking Department.
- No 19: back of the garden of Hôtel Beauharnais, 78, rue de Lille.
- No 21: back of the garden of the Hôtel de Seignelay, 80, rue de Lille.
- No 23: apartment occupied by Claude Chappe.
- No 25: Hôtel Collot, designed by Louis Visconti in neoclassical style and built in 1840–1841 by Antoine Vivenel, for Jean-Pierre Collot (1764–1852), supplier to the armies and director of the Monnaie de Paris from 1821 to 1842. The facade, adorned with superimposed columns, is set back slightly on a basement with bosses, leaving a terrace where two statues imitated from the Antique stand up. The hotel stands on the site of the gardens of the former Hôtel du Maine, built for the Duke of Maine by Antoine Mazin, Robert de Cotte and Armand-Claude Mollet between 1716 and 1726. Hôtel Collot was sold in 1852, on the death of his sponsor, General Mahmoud Ben Ayed, from an important Djerba family dating back to the 17th century. Appointed director of the state stores by the Bey of Tunis Ahmed I, gradually holder of all the rents of Tunisia, he created a bank in 1847 and obtained the monopoly of the issue of refundable bearer notes, guaranteed on funds of the state. According to the report of a financial inspector sent on a mission to Tunis, he embezzled 50 to 60 million francs. In 1850, the general obtained French nationality and, in 1852, he left Tunisia with his treasure while keeping certain businesses there. In addition to the Collot hotel, he bought investment properties in Paris, as well as the Château de Bouges in 1853. But he was the subject of legal proceedings which forced him to flee to Constantinople and resell his property. The hotel then housed the Spanish Embassy from 1864 to 1880. It was acquired in 1923 by the antique dealer Isaac Founes, a specialist in French furniture, then in 1932 by the Société générale commerciale de l'Est, which installed its offices there. offices and whose owners made it their home until 2004, when it became the property of the antique dealers Nicolas and Alexis Kugel who had it carefully restored by the architect Laurent Bourgois and the decorator François-Joseph Graf and have installed their gallery.
- No 27: building built in 1905 by Richard Bouwens van der Boijen.
- No 27 bis: Agency for the dissemination of technological information (Adit).
