= Palais d'Orsay =

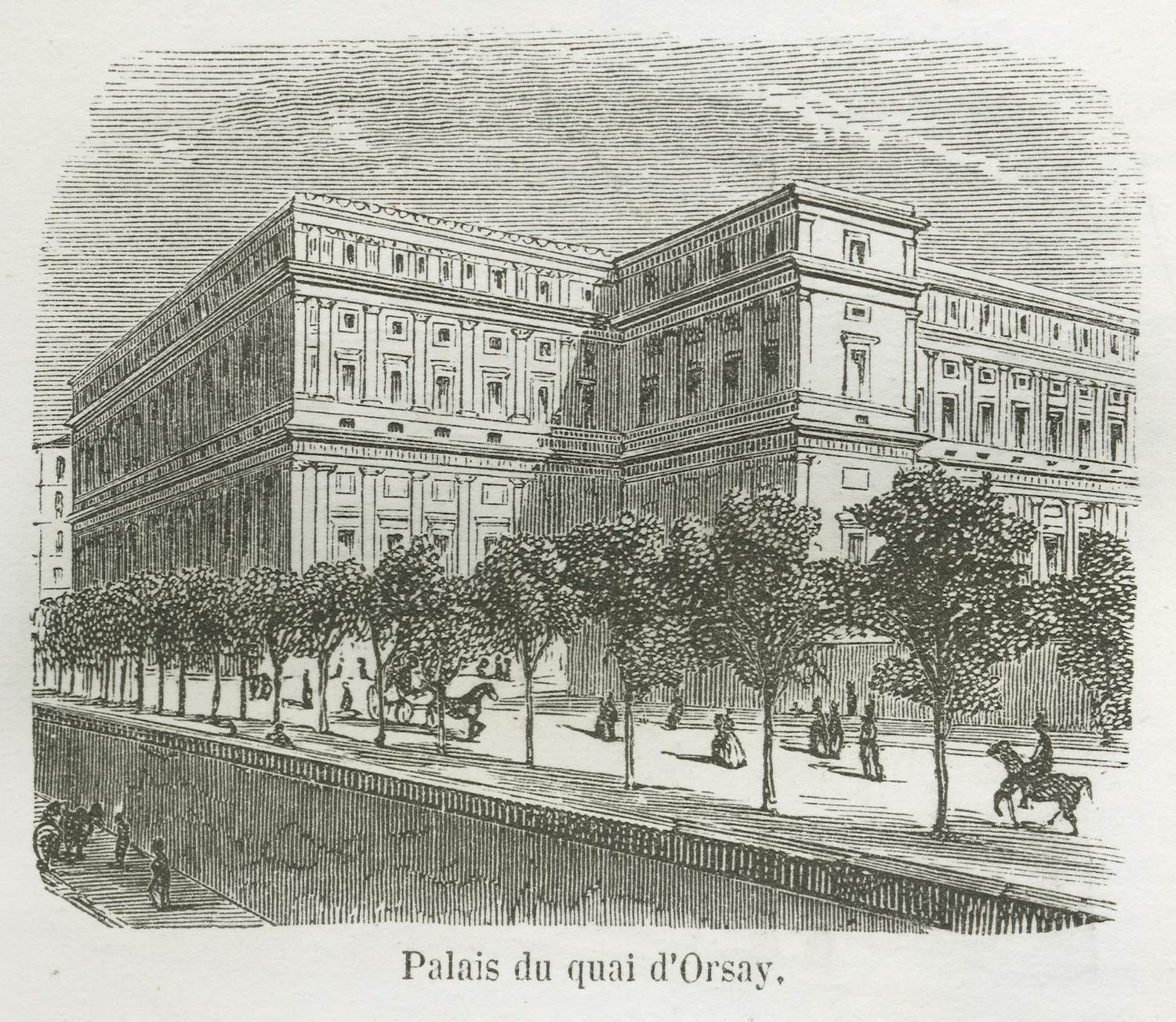
- The Palais d'Orsay in 1855
- Interactive map of the Palais d'Orsay area

General information
- Architectural style: Neoclassical
- Location: Quai d'Orsay, Paris, France
- Coordinates: 48°51′36″N 2°19′35″E
- Current tenants: Council of State, Court of Audit
- Construction started: 1810
- Completed: 1838
- Demolished: 24 May 1871 (fire); 1898 (demolished)
- Client: Napoleon

Design and construction
- Architects: Jacques-Charles Bonnard, Jacques Lacornée

The Palais d'Orsay was an administrative building in Paris that occupied the current site of the Musée d'Orsay on the Quai d'Orsay from 1810 to 1898.

== History ==
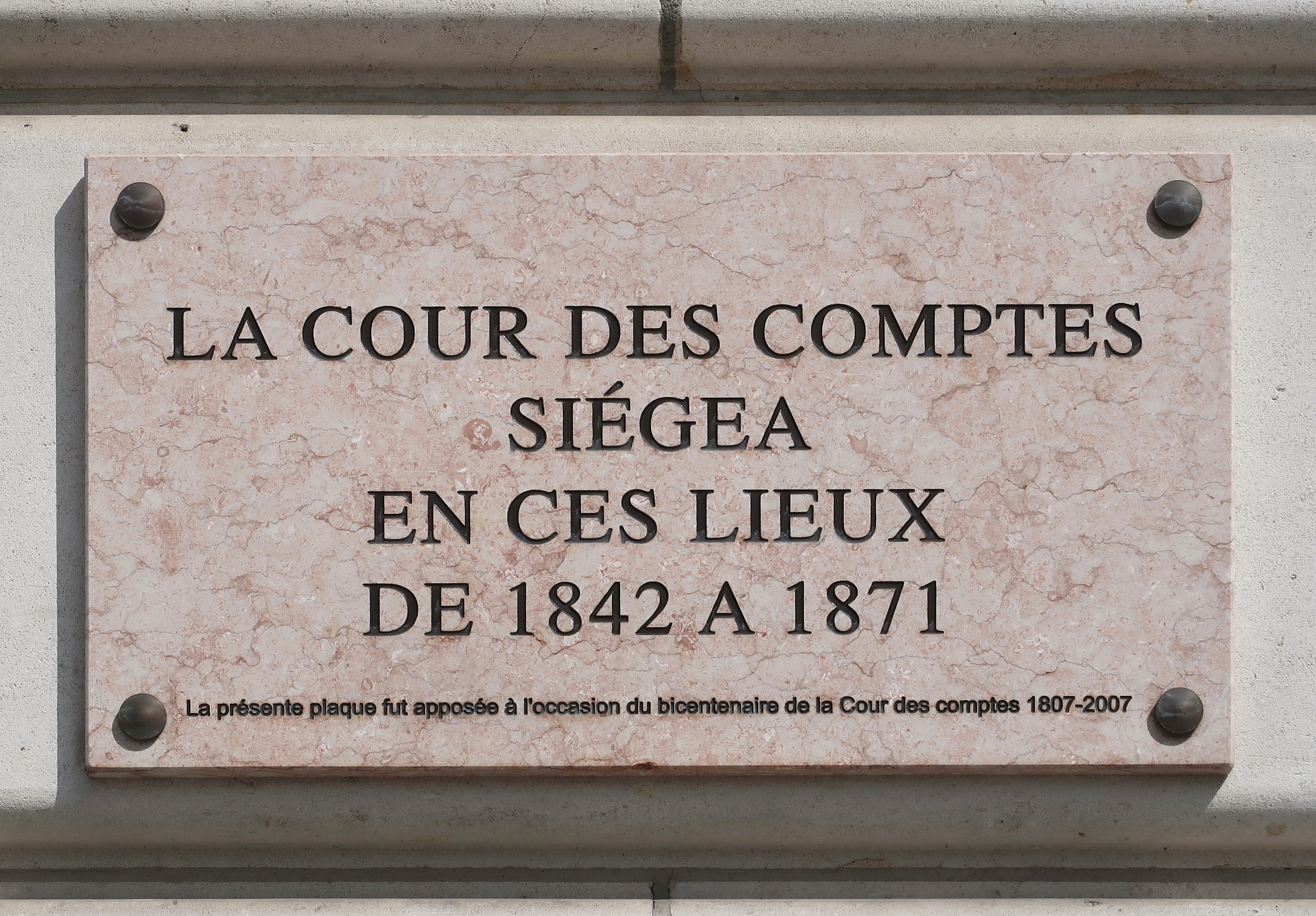
Plaque on the facade of the Musée d'Orsay marking the location of the former seat of the Court of Audit.

In the 19th century, the site of the future Gare d'Orsay was occupied by two buildings: the cavalry barracks and the Palais d'Orsay. They were separated by the Rue de Poitiers. The Palais d'Orsay was built at the initiative of Napoleon between 1810 and 1838 by Jacques-Charles Bonnard and later by Jacques Lacornée. Bonnard's plans and elevations, dated 1808 and 1810, are kept at the Musée Carnavalet (D 4462 to 4469). The foundation stone was laid on April 4, 1810. The foundation deposit was recovered on January 4, 1899 and is kept at the Musée Carnavalet (ND 2977 to 2993, NN 59 to 61).

Initially intended for the Ministry of Foreign Affairs, the Palais d'Orsay was assigned to the Council of State, which moved into the ground floor in 1840. The Court of Audit joined it on the first floor in 1842.

The frescoes painted in 1844–1846 for the grand staircase of the Court of Audit were the major work of Théodore Chassériau. Only 60 square meters of these frescoes, left exposed to the elements for twenty-seven years, were saved before the demolition of the palace ruins began in 1898. This salvage was possible due to a campaign launched between 1879 and 1898 by the Chassériau committee, initiated by his second cousin Baron Arthur Chassériau and Ary Renan. The saved fragments were then donated to the Musée du Louvre.

The frescoes of the Palais d'Orsay staircase by Chassériau

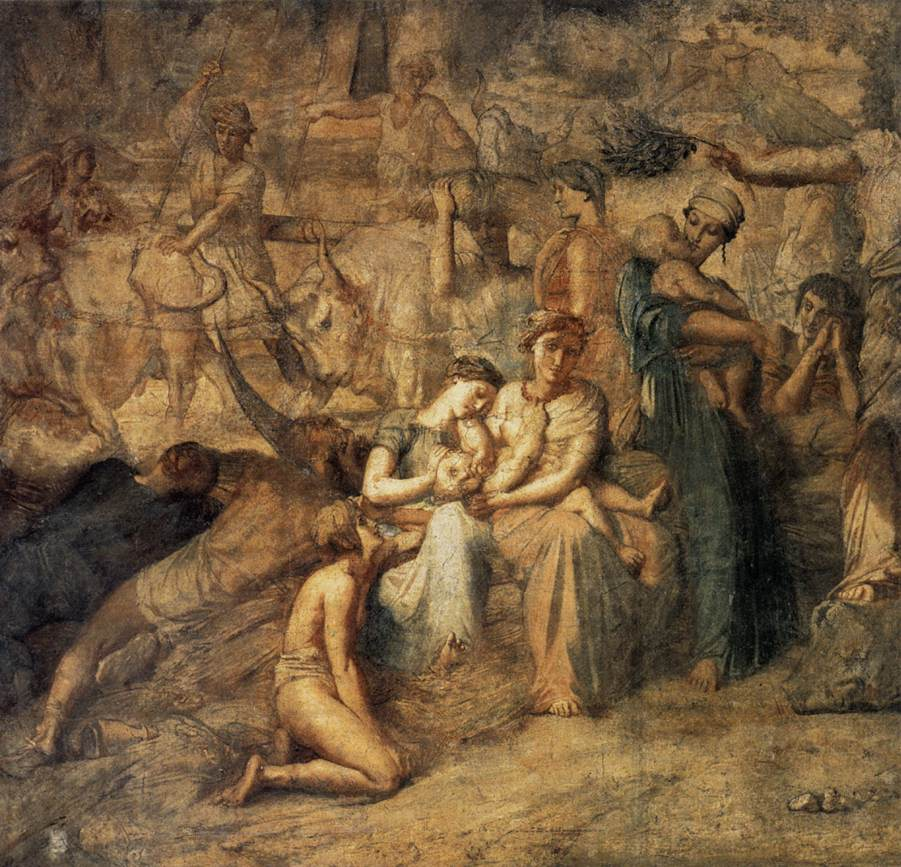
Peace (fragment of Peace Protecting the Arts and the Works of the Earth)

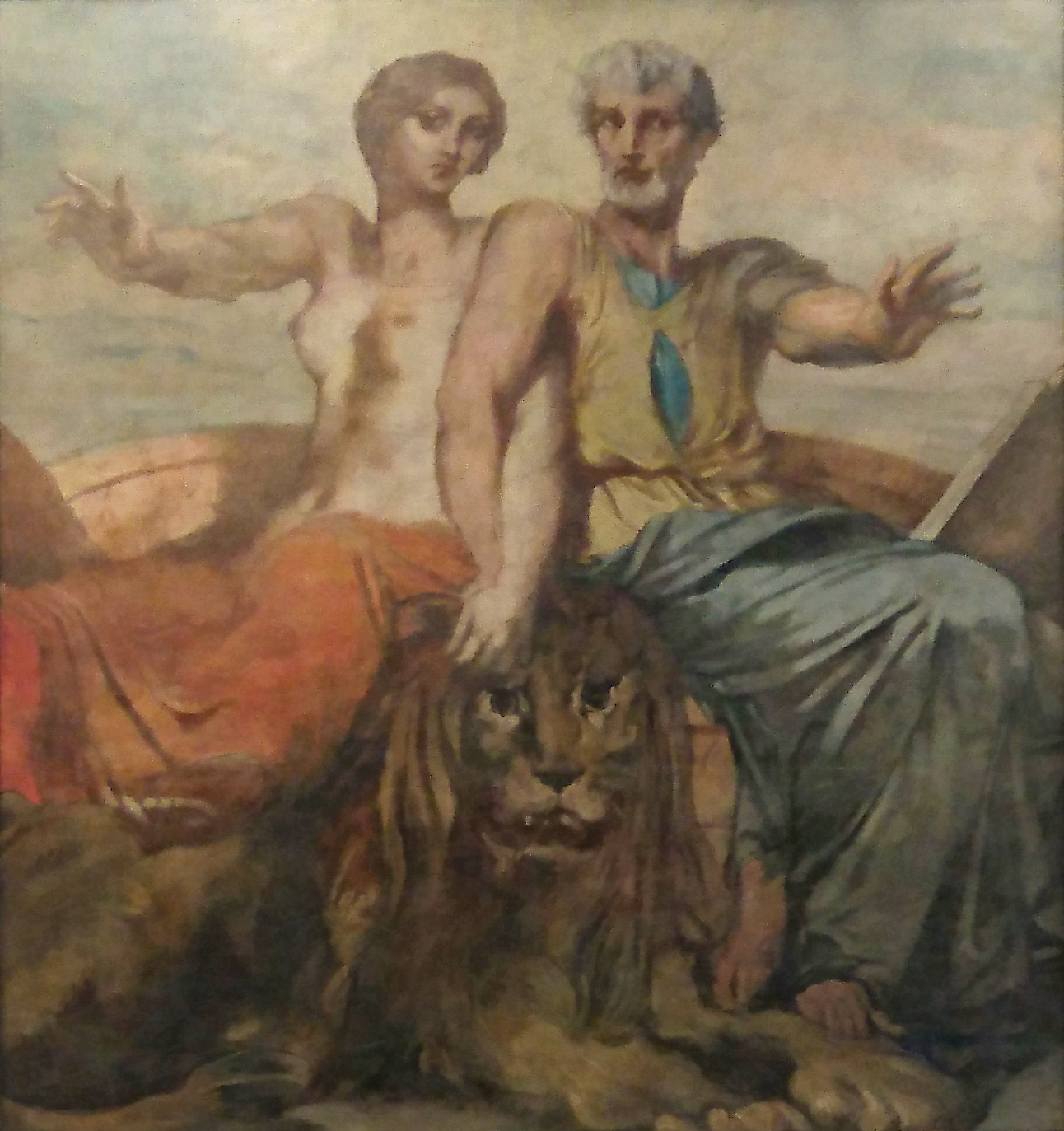
Strength and Order

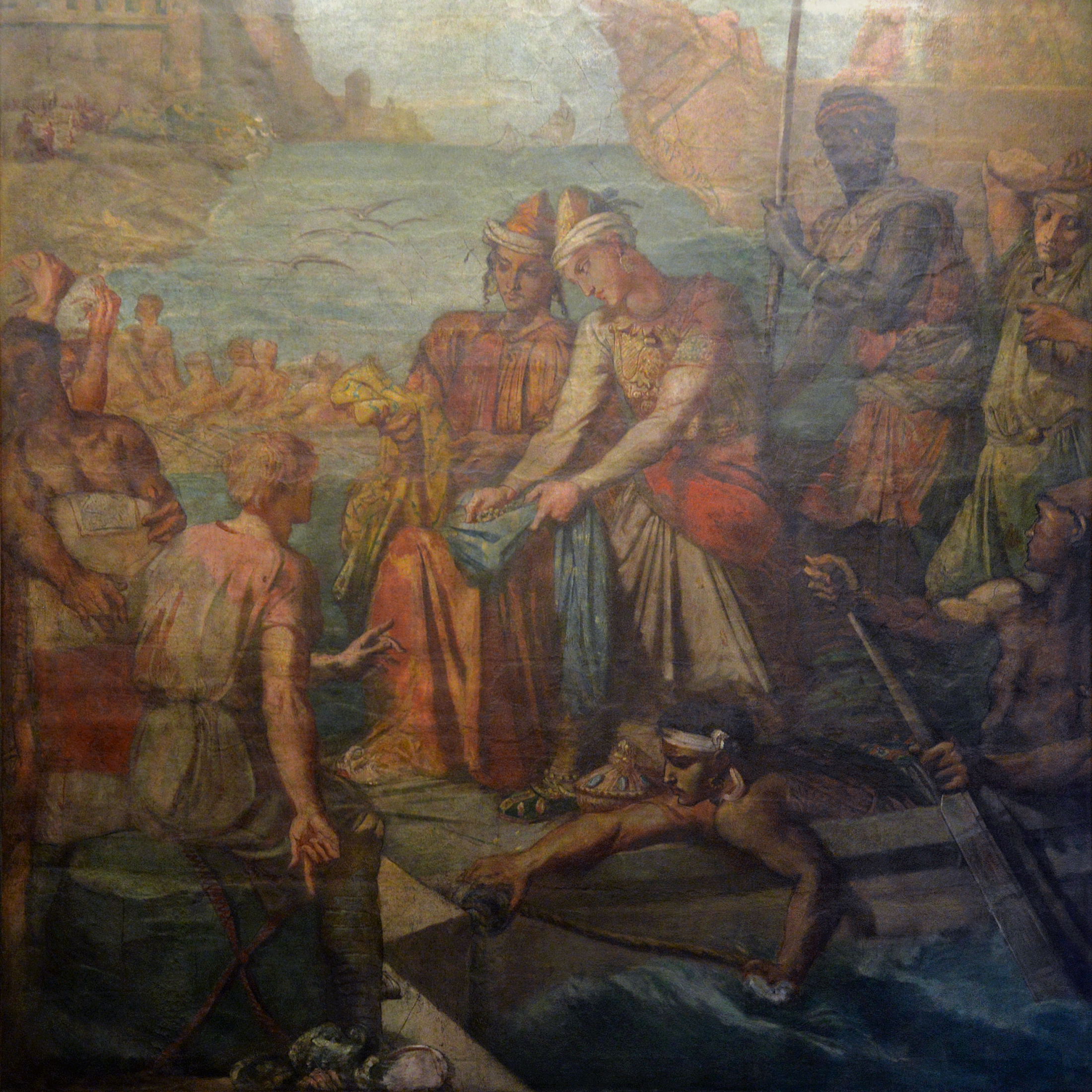
Oriental Merchants in a Western Port

In 1870, the end of the Second Empire saw the creation of a provisional commission (March 15, 1870 to August 1872) to replace the Council of State. The Paris Commune (March 18, 1871) forced its relocation to the Château de Versailles, along with its archives, library, and artworks.

The Palais d'Orsay was burned by the Communards on the night of May 23 to 24, 1871. The fire was described by Émile Zola in La Débâcle:

The immense fire, the most enormous, the most appalling, the giant stone cube, with its two stories of porticoes, vomiting flames. The four buildings, which surrounded the great inner courtyard, had caught fire at once; and there, the petroleum, poured by the ton down the four staircases at the four corners, had streamed down, rolling along the steps in torrents of hell.

The Council of State, replacing the commission, moved in August 1872 to the Hôtel de Rothelin-Charolais at 101, Rue de Grenelle. In 1876, it relocated to the Palais-Royal, where it remains today. The Court of Audit also moved to the Palais-Royal before transferring in 1912 to the Palais Cambon, built for its use. The site of the Palais d'Orsay was purchased by the Compagnie Paris-Orléans. The company built its new terminus station, the Gare d'Orsay, on the site in preparation for the 1900 Exposition Universelle.

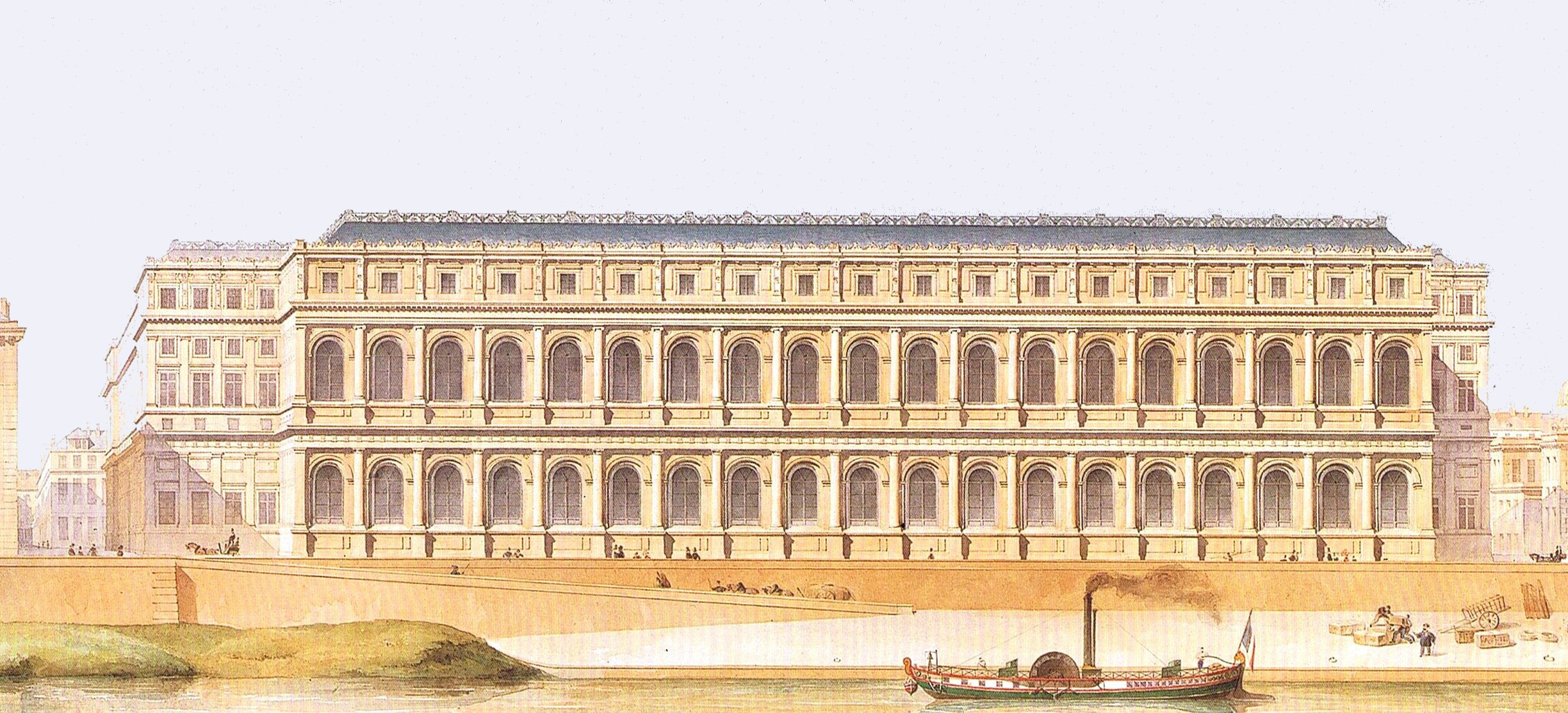
The Palais d'Orsay during the July Monarchy by Félix Duban.

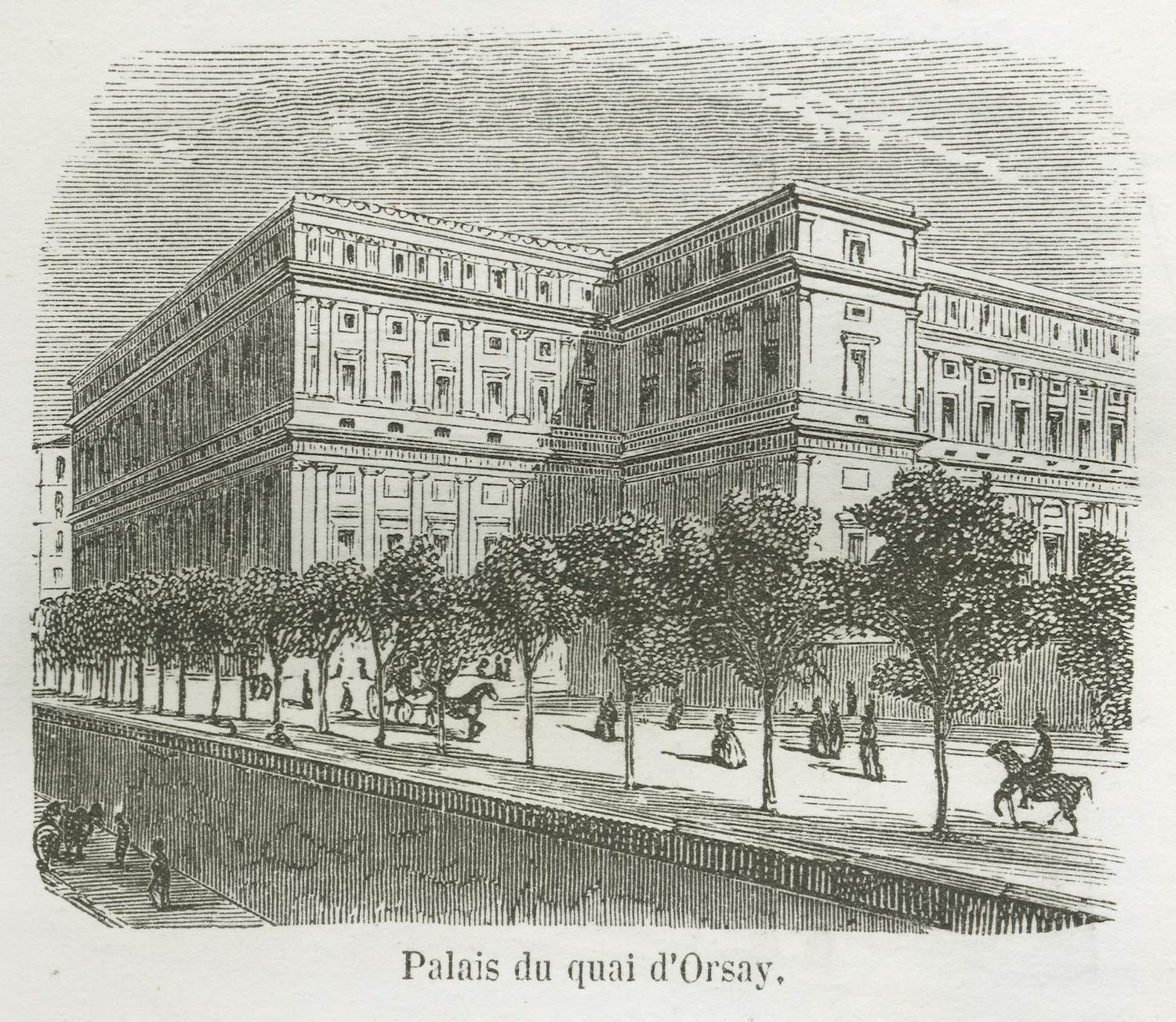
The Palais d'Orsay in 1855.

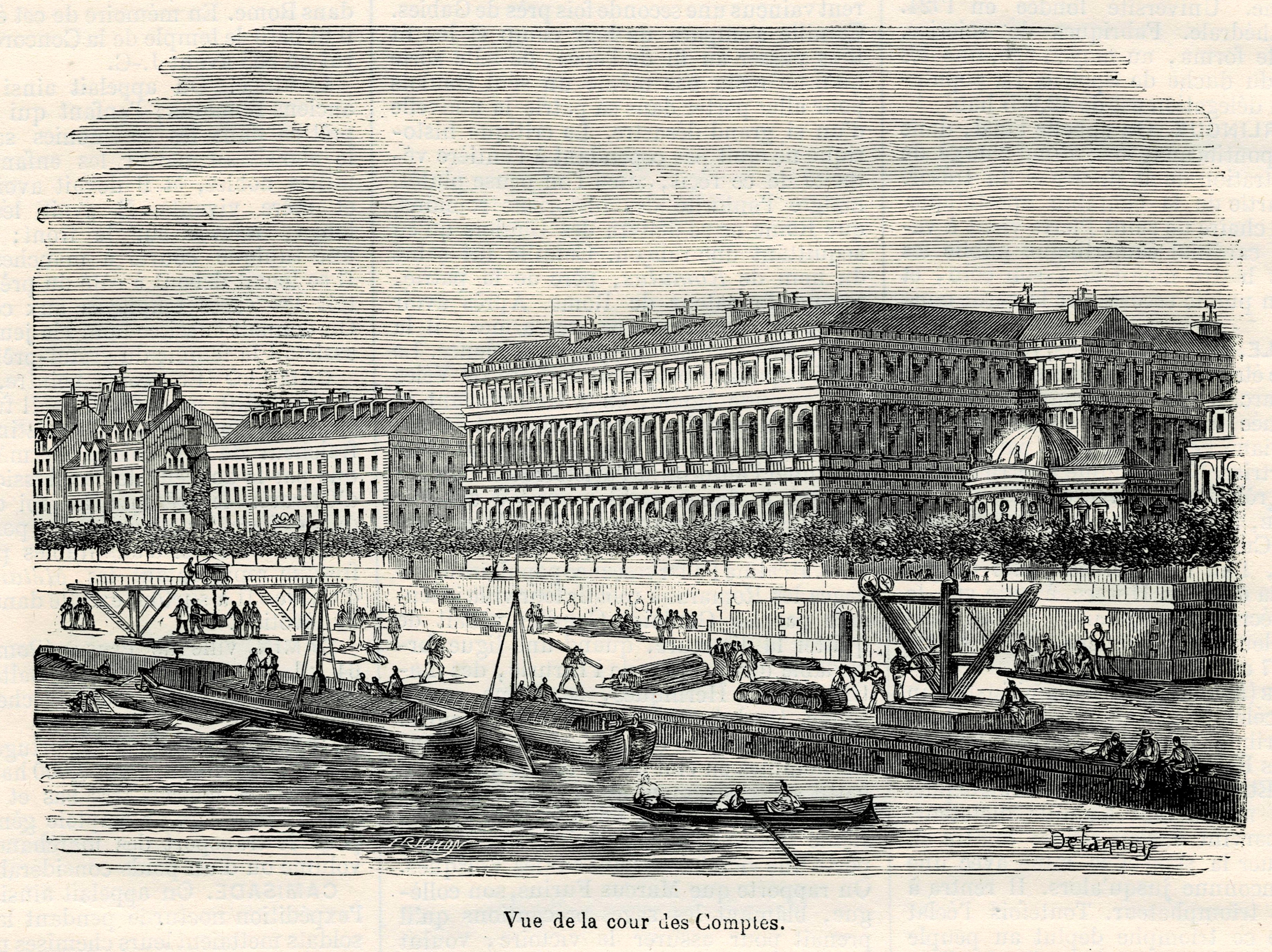
The Palais d'Orsay in 1862.

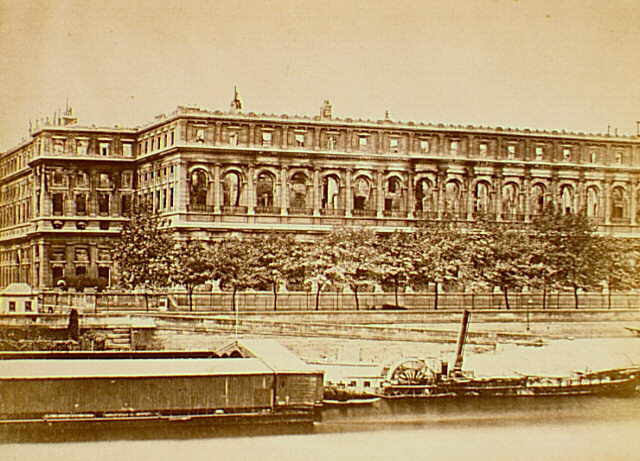
The Palais d'Orsay after the Paris Commune.

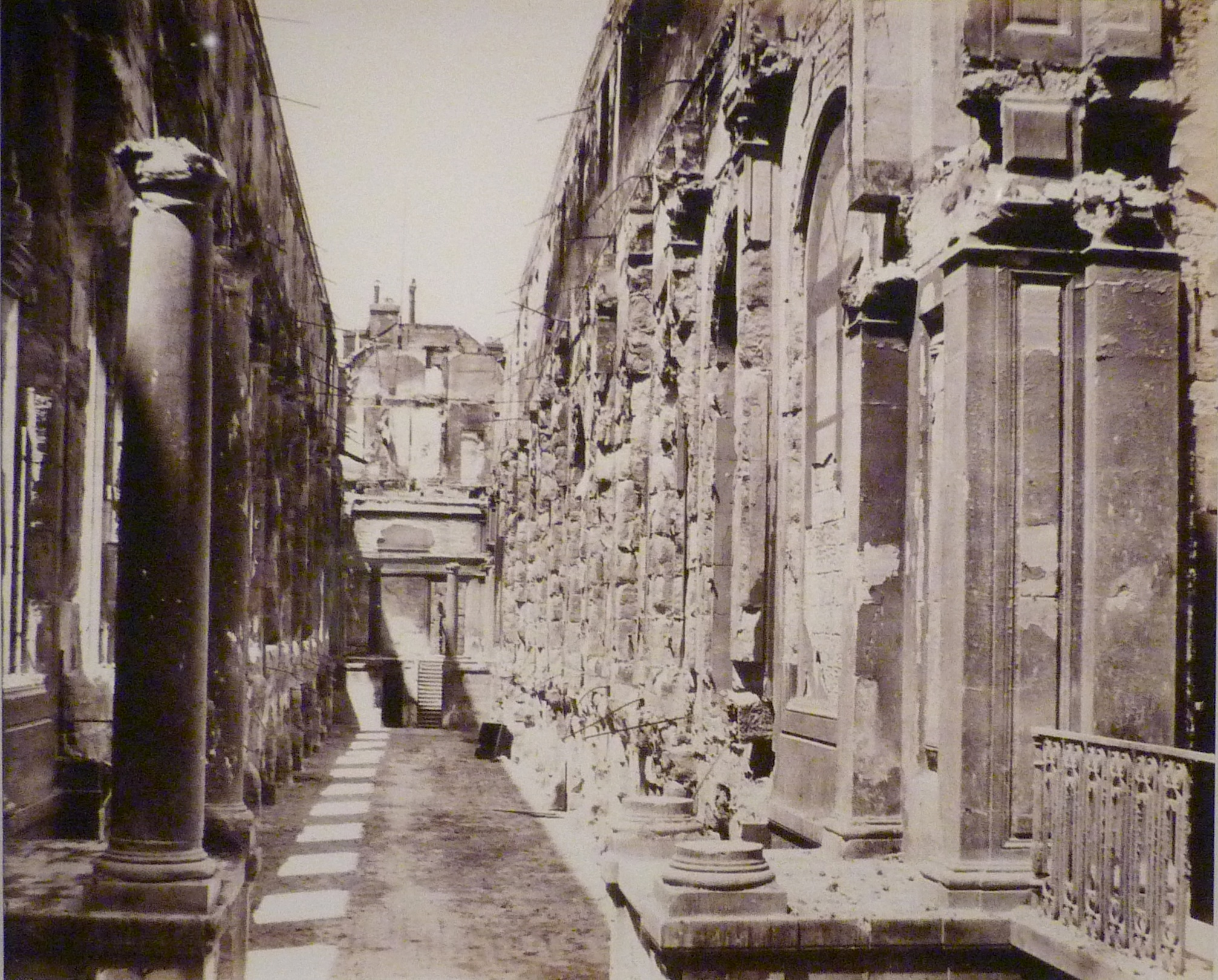
Interior of the burned palace.

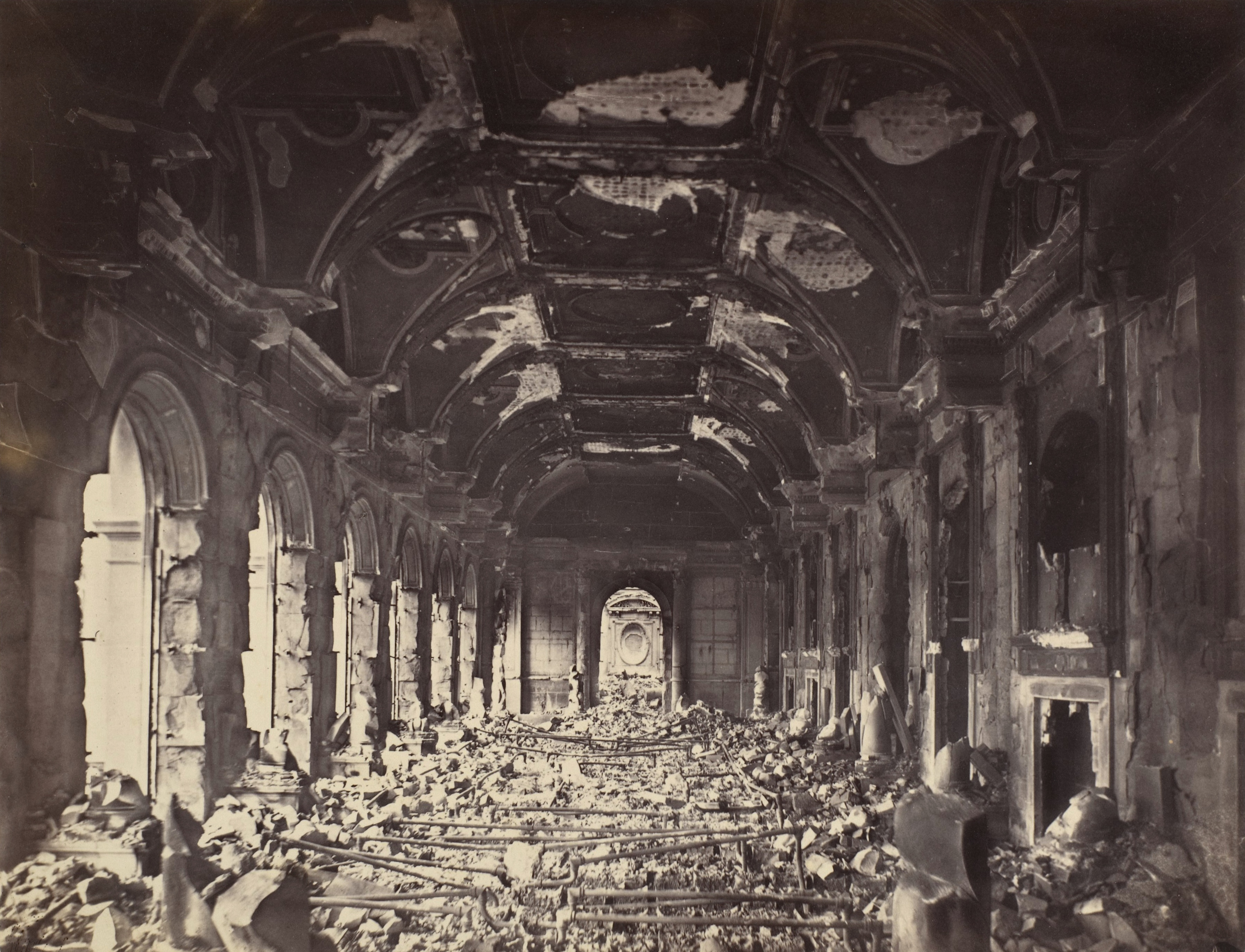
The grand hall of the Council of State after the fire.

== See also ==
- Fires in the Paris Commune

== Sources ==
- Leniaud, Jean-Michel (2021). "Entre deux expositions universelles : les ruines d'un palais" (PDF). La Cour des comptes au palais d'Orsay: Chronique d'un drame de pierre (PDF) (in French). Paris: La Documentation Française. ISBN 978-2-11-157138-9.
- Lewandowski, Hélène (2020). Le palais d'Orsay: Une autre histoire du XIXe siècle (in French). Paris: Passés composés. ISBN 978-2-37933-475-7.
