= Hôtel de Lassay =

Coordinates: 48°51′44″N 2°19′02″E

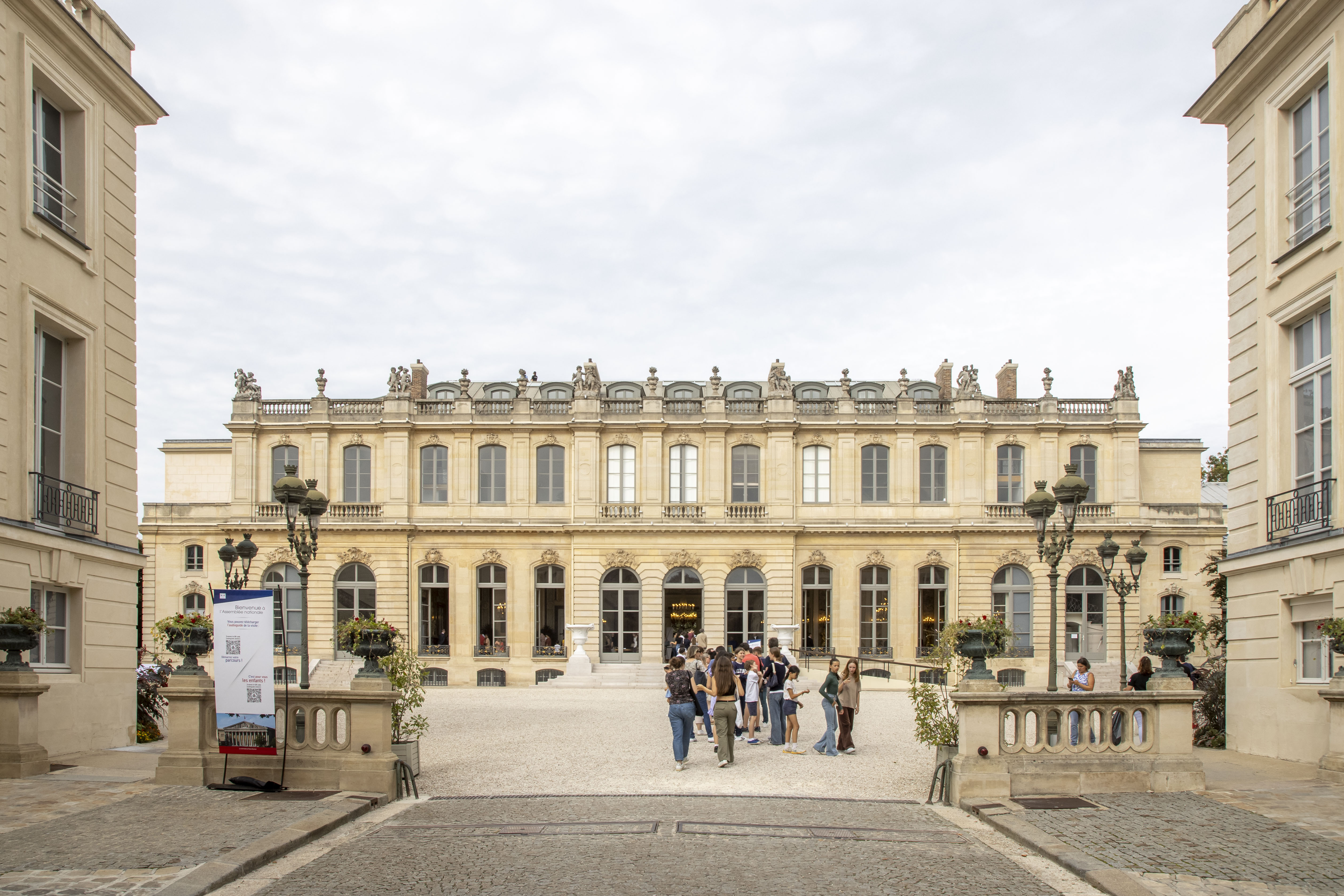
Court façade

The Hôtel de Lassay (French pronunciation: [otɛl d(ə) lasɛ]) is a private mansion located on the Rue de l'Université, in the 7th arrondissement of Paris, France. It is the current residence of the president of the National Assembly, and adjoins the Palais Bourbon, the seat of the lower house of Parliament.

The Hôtel de Lassay is also adjacent to the Hôtel du ministre des Affaires étrangères, the seat of the Ministry of Foreign Affairs.
