= Hôtel du ministre des Affaires étrangères =

Government building in Paris, France

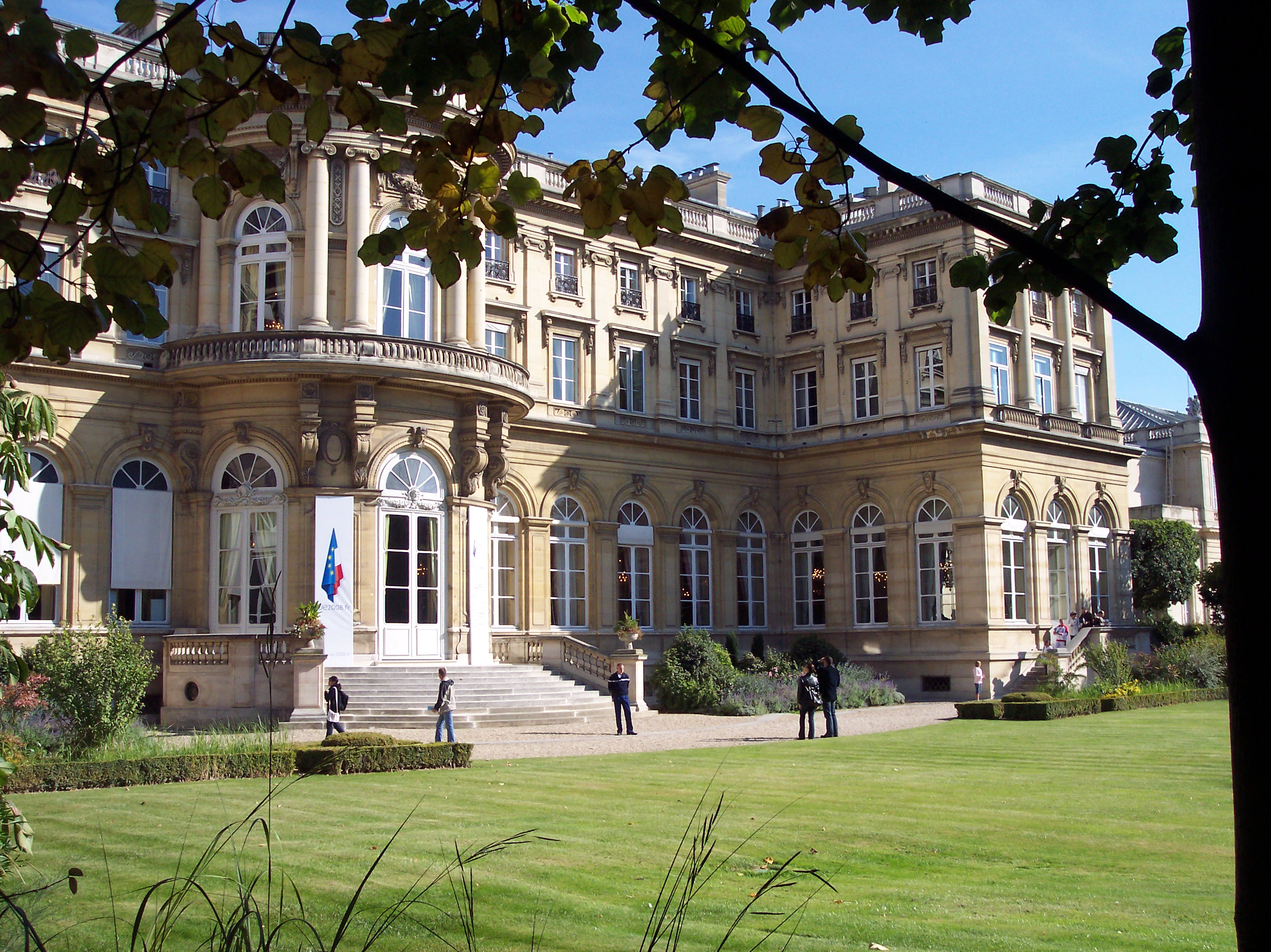
- The building seen from the garden

General information
- Location: Paris, France
- Coordinates: 48.8623°N 2.3162°E
- Construction started: 1844
- Completed: 1855
- Owner: Ministry of Foreign Affairs

Design and construction
- Architect: Jacques Lacornée

Website
- www.diplomatie.gouv.fr/fr/

The Hôtel du ministre des Affaires étrangères (French pronunciation: [otɛl dy ministʁ dez‿afɛʁ(z‿)etʁɑ̃ʒɛʁ]) is a government building at 37 Quai d'Orsay in Paris along the Seine. It was built between 1844 and 1855 to house the Ministry of Foreign Affairs, which has occupied the premises since then. The expression "Quai d'Orsay" refers to the ministry.

== Location ==
The site is served by the Paris Métro and RER station Invalides.

The building is just west of the Hôtel de Lassay, the official residence of the President of the National Assembly. The two architectural complexes do not connect.

== History ==
The Hôtel de Galliffet, whose owner had emigrated, was assigned to the Ministry of Foreign Affairs in 1795. In 1820, when the building was returned to the heirs of the Marquis de Gallifet, the ministry moved to the Boulevard des Capucines to the Hôtel de Wagram (also known as the Hôtel de la Colonnade). This building was sold to the state by the heirs of Marshal Berthier, Prince of Wagram.

The project to construct an official building for diplomatic activities was initiated by Minister of Foreign Affairs François Guizot in 1844. The foundation stone was laid in 1845 in the presence of Guizot, the architect Jacques Lacornée, and the Minister of Public Works Pierre Sylvain Dumon. The work was delayed by the Revolution of 1848, but it resumed under Napoleon III and was completed in 1855. The stone used in the construction is Lutetian limestone (cliquart) from the Fleury quarries in Clamart.

Great attention was given to the interior and exterior decoration because the building was meant to host foreign sovereigns and diplomats. Experienced sculptors who had worked on restoring castles and churches did the exterior decoration. Well-known artists such as Séchan, Nolau and Rubé, Dominique Molknecht, Lavigne, Michel Joseph Napoléon Liénard, Hippolyte Adam, the Huber brothers, and Victor Paillard did the interior decoration. The design was meant to impress visitors and highlight the building's ceremonial function. It mixes elements from Antiquity, the Renaissance, and the classical period.

The overall style is Napoleon III, except for the royal bathrooms. These were created in 1938 for the visit of King George VI and Queen Elizabeth. It is a masterpiece of Art Deco interior design influenced by the luxury architecture of ocean liners. It features work by mosaicist and glassmaker Auguste Labouret and furniture by Jacques Adnet.

For over a century and a half, the building has hosted major international negotiations. These include the 1856 Treaty of Paris, which ended the Crimean War, and the 1919 Treaty of Versailles, which ended World War I. Robert Schuman, then Minister of Foreign Affairs, delivered his famous Schuman Declaration in the building's Salon de l'Horloge on May 9, 1950. This event is considered the foundation of European unity. Due to its size and its connection to the Gallery of Peace, the Salon de l'Horloge is the main reception room. It was previously called the Emperor's Room, the Festival Room, or the Concert Room, and then the Peace Room until World War I. It was later named the Salon de l'Horloge after a clock made by the sculptor Victor Paillard.

Soldiers died while liberating the building on August 25, 1944. An inscription and a plaque honor them at 1 Rue Robert-Esnault-Pelterie, which runs along the west side of the building.

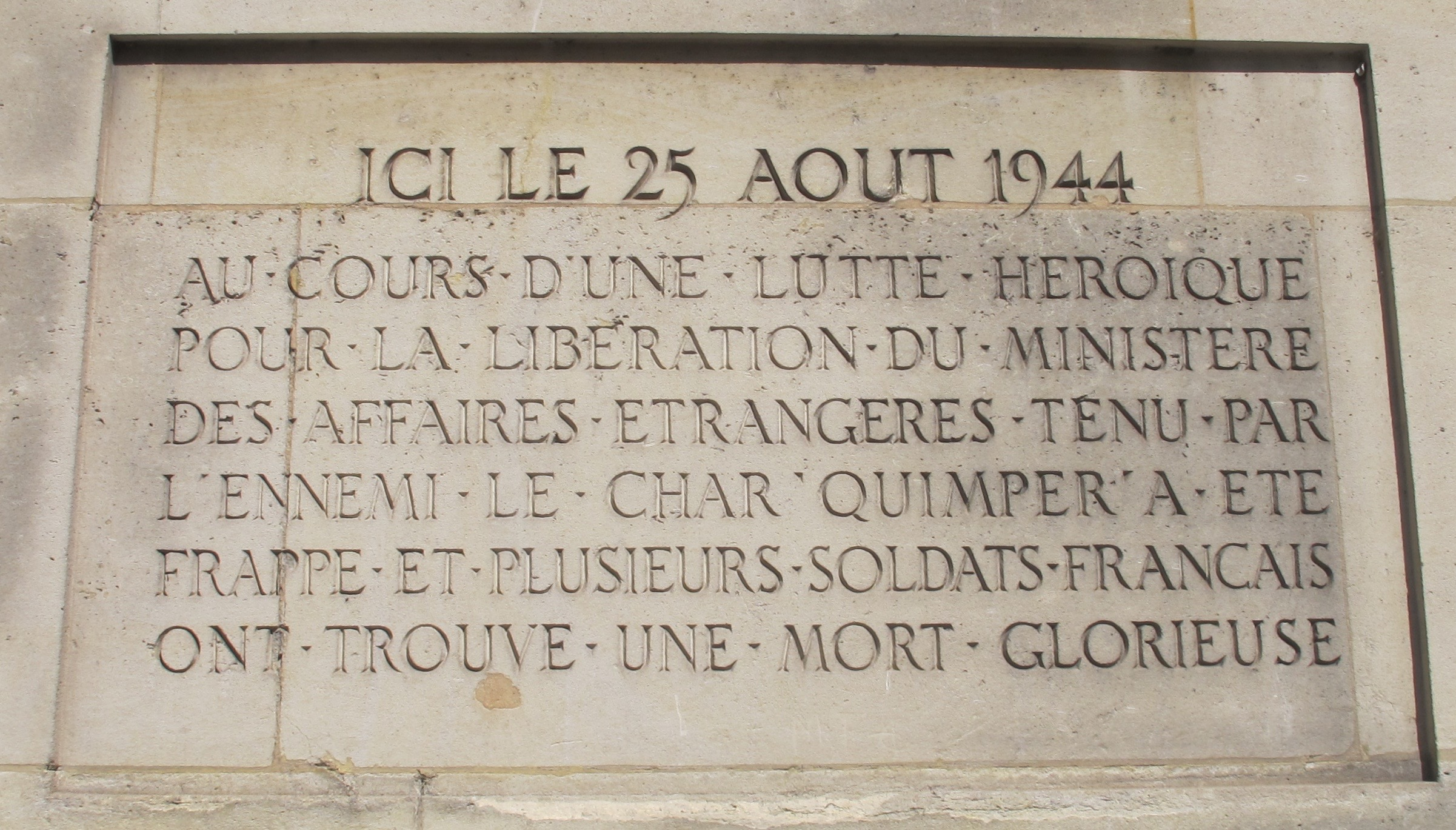
World War II tribute inscription

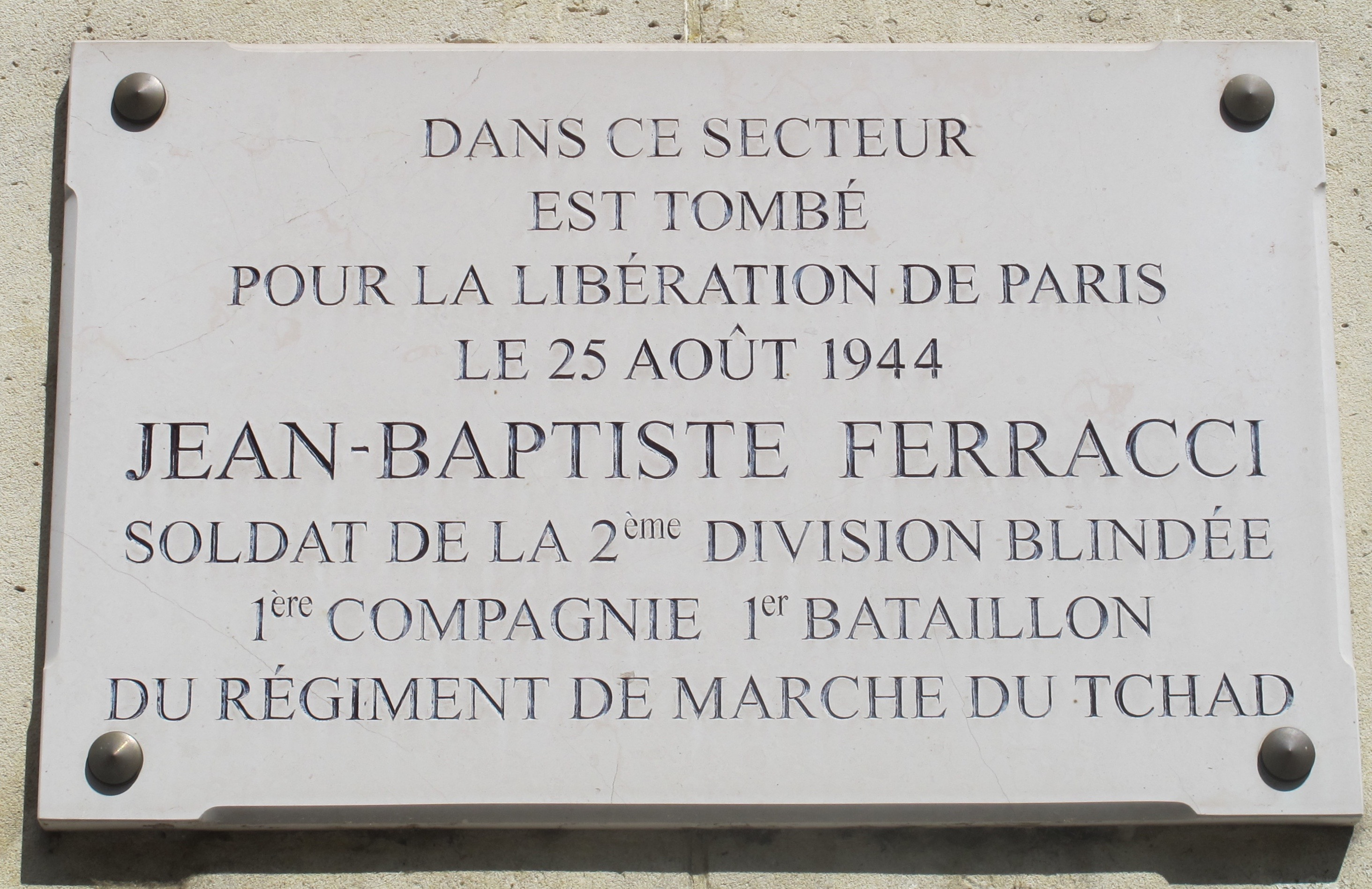
World War II tribute plaque

In 2018, it was announced that the site would be modernized and expanded by 2022. The ministry would then keep only three sites: this building, the Convention site, and the Diplomatic Archives in La Courneuve. The project by architects Jean-Marc Ibos and Myrto Vitart creates a new building with a large glass roof. It includes 600 modular workstations and common areas like training rooms, meeting rooms, a cafeteria, and a library. The goal is to improve the reception and movement of people on the site.

== Gallery ==
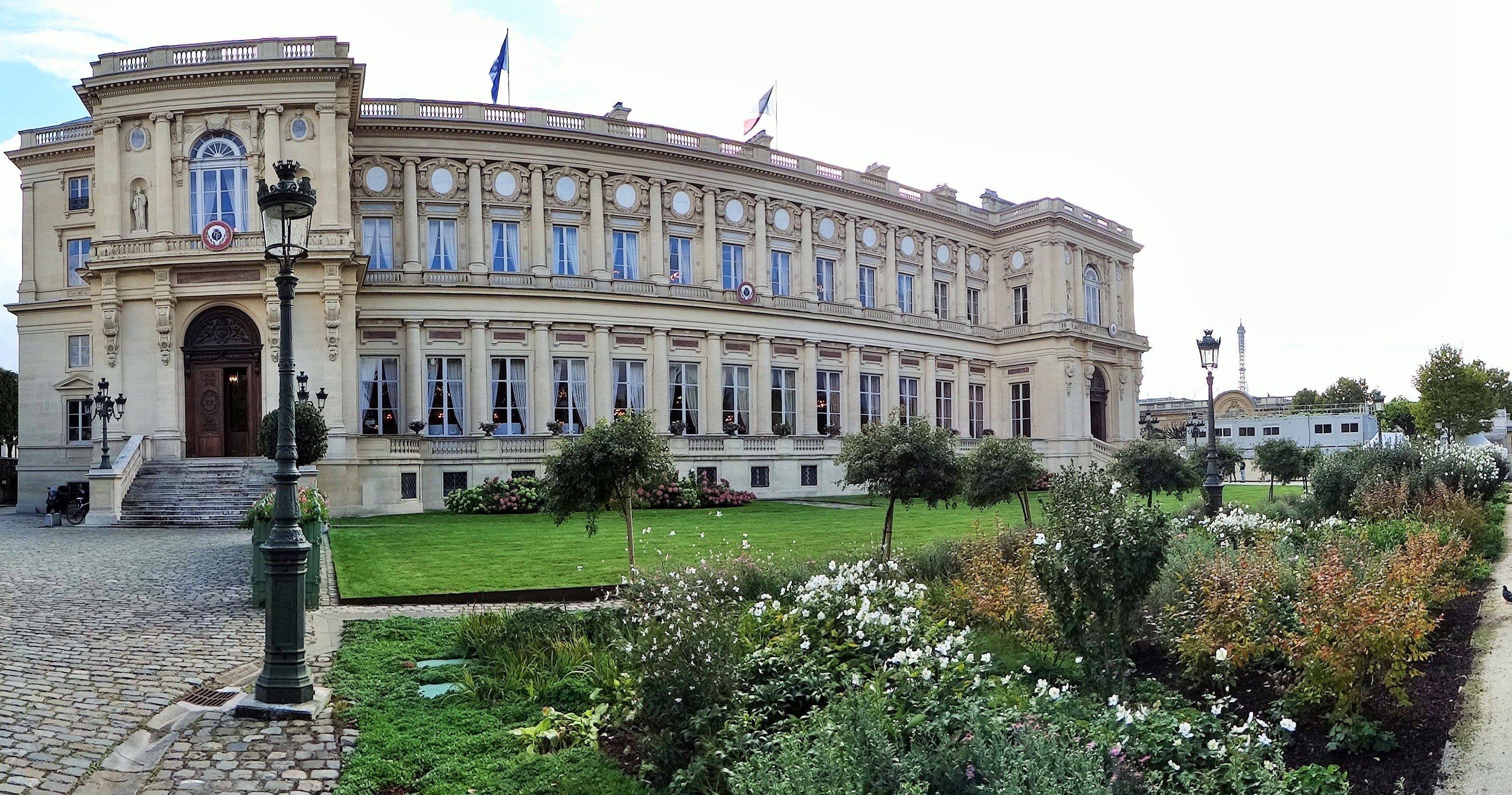
View of the building from Quai d'Orsay

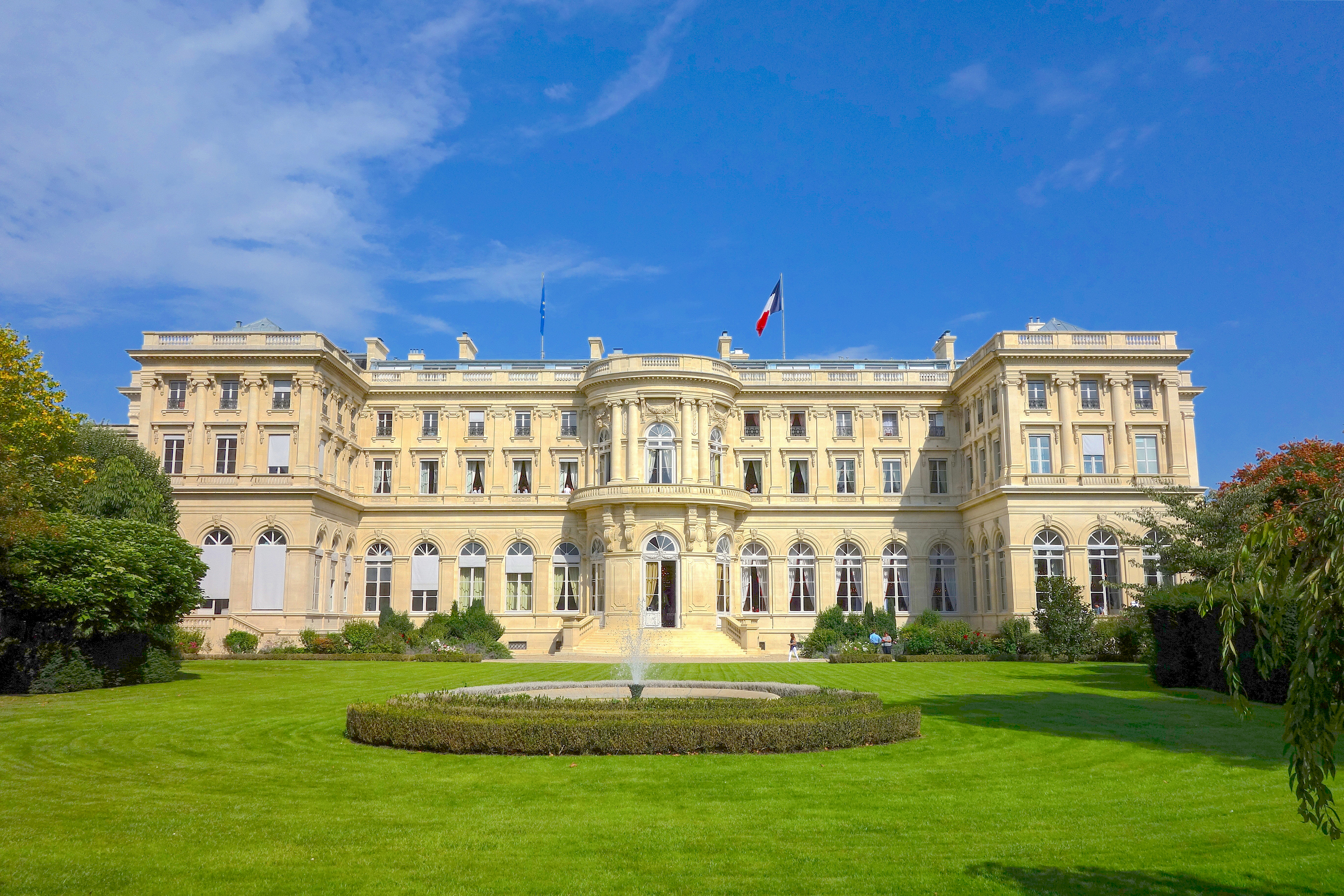
View of the building from the garden

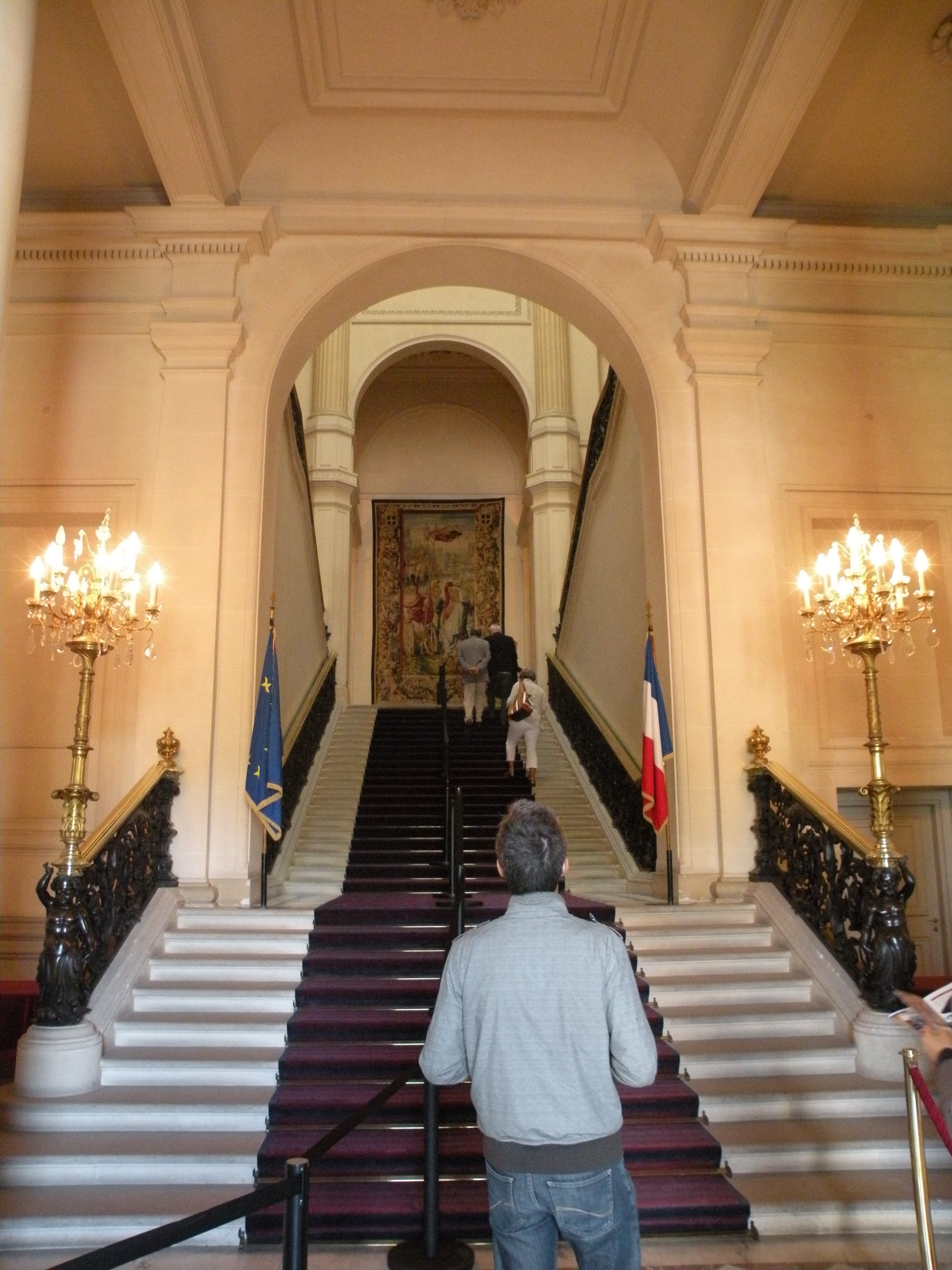
Grand staircase

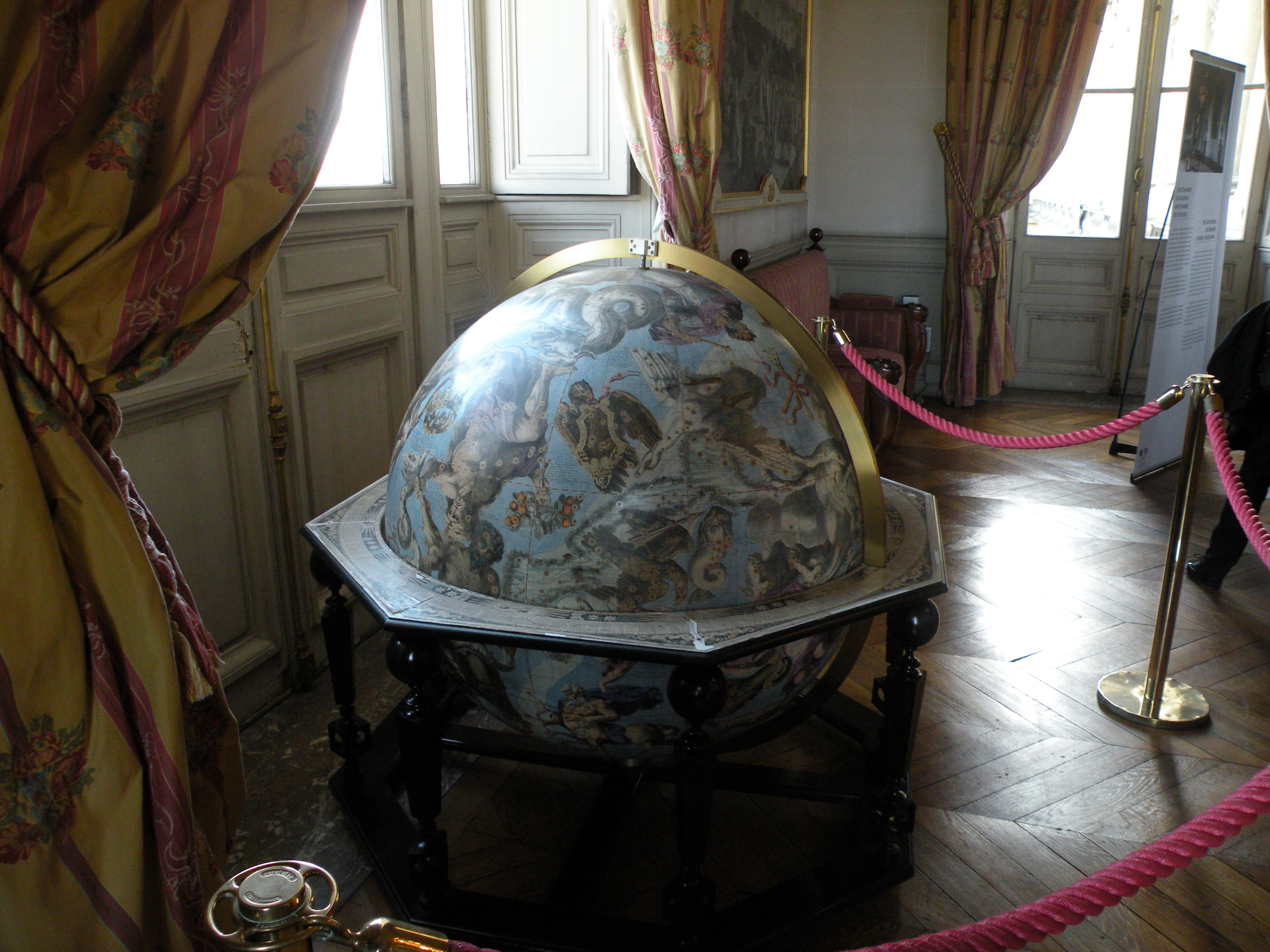
Globe in the map room

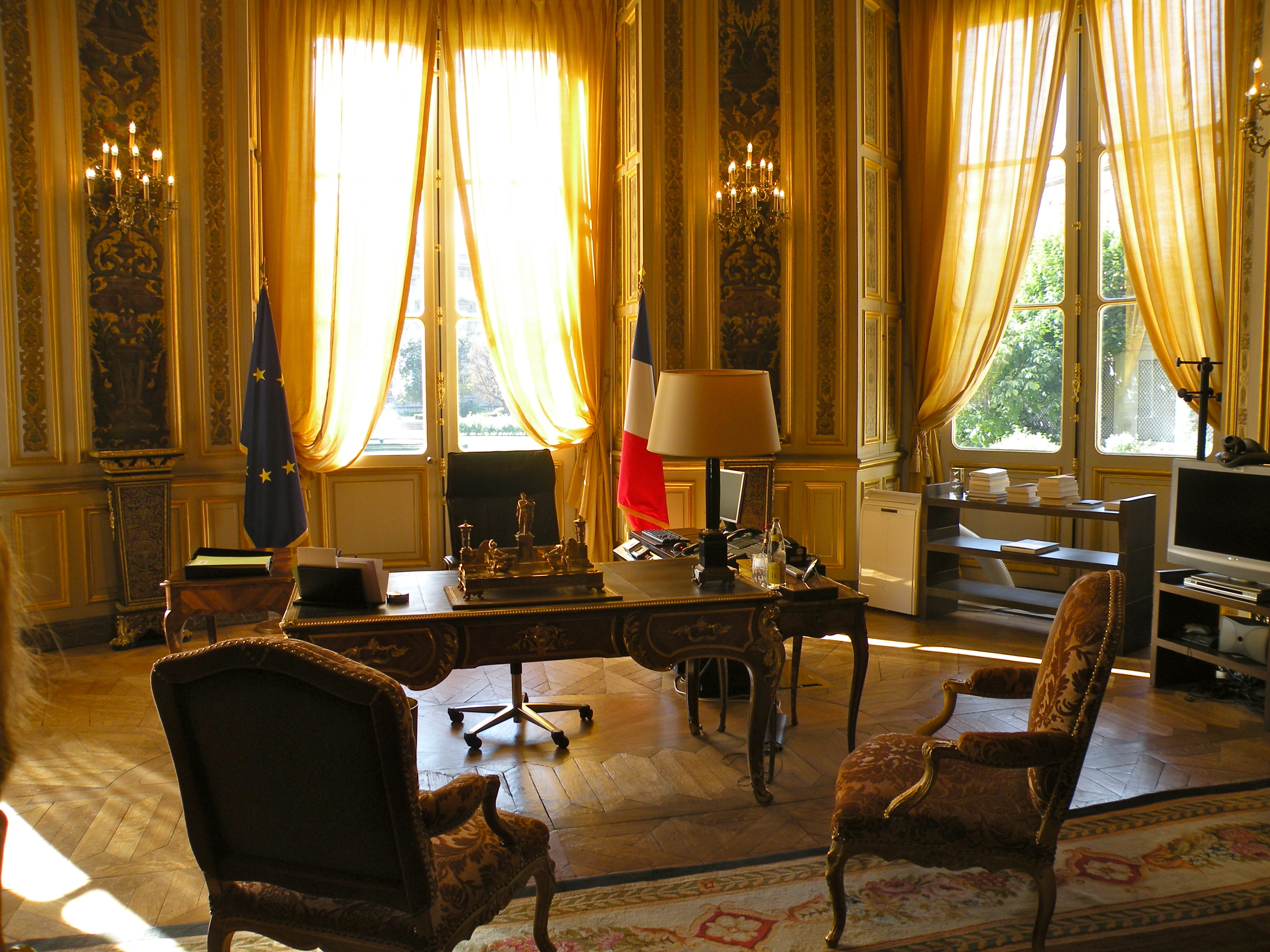
Minister's office

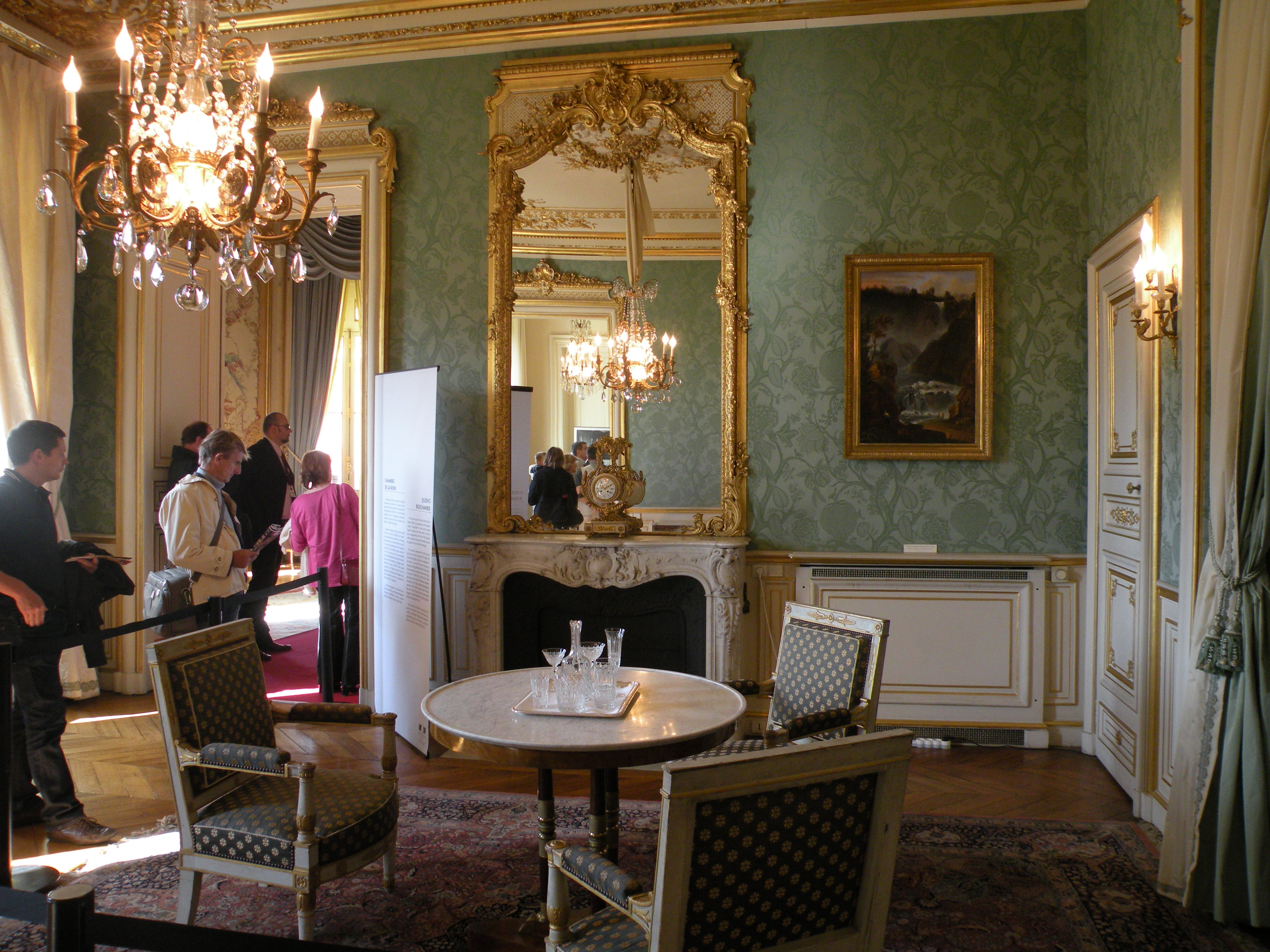
Queen's bedroom

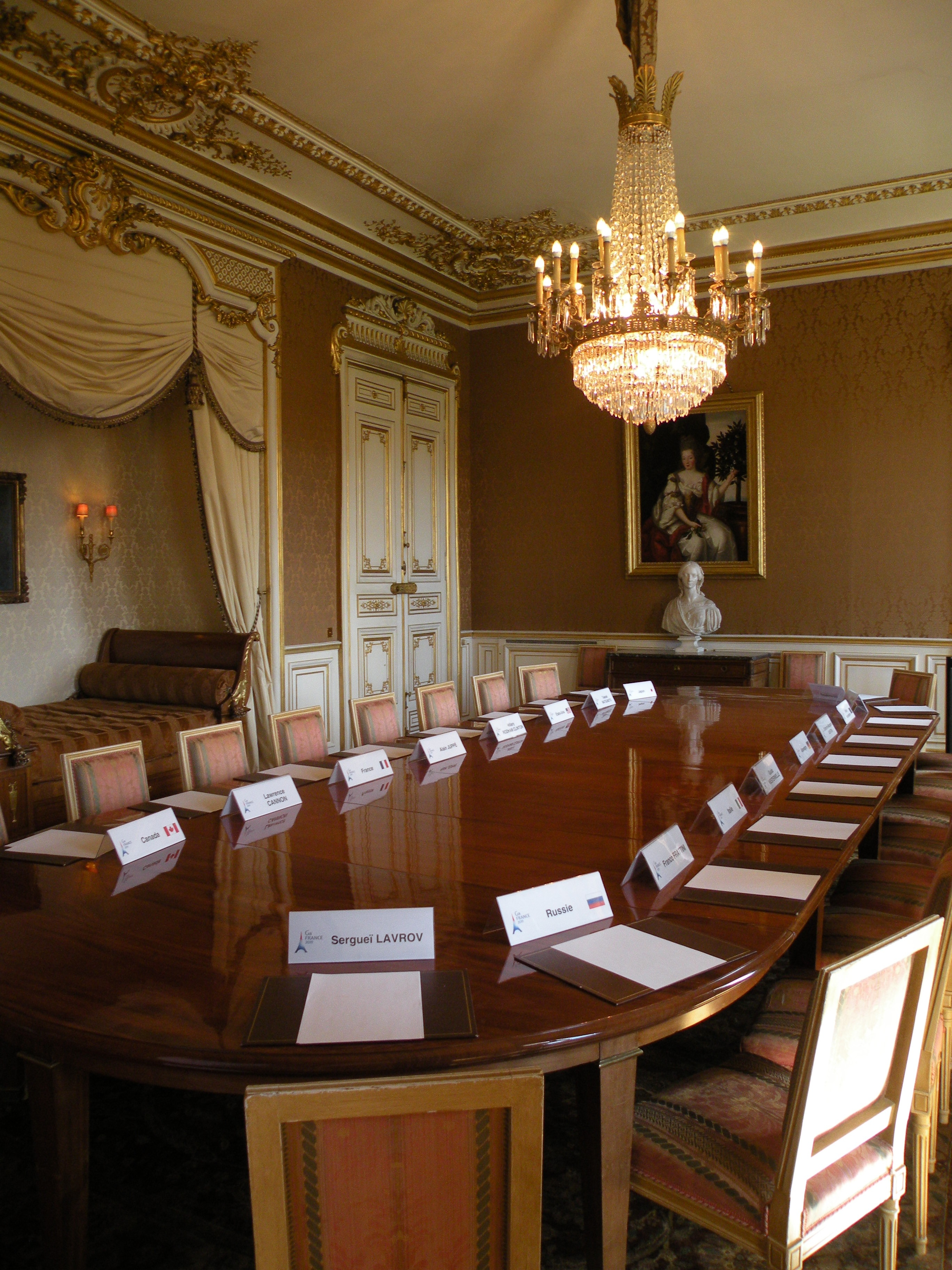
King's bedroom

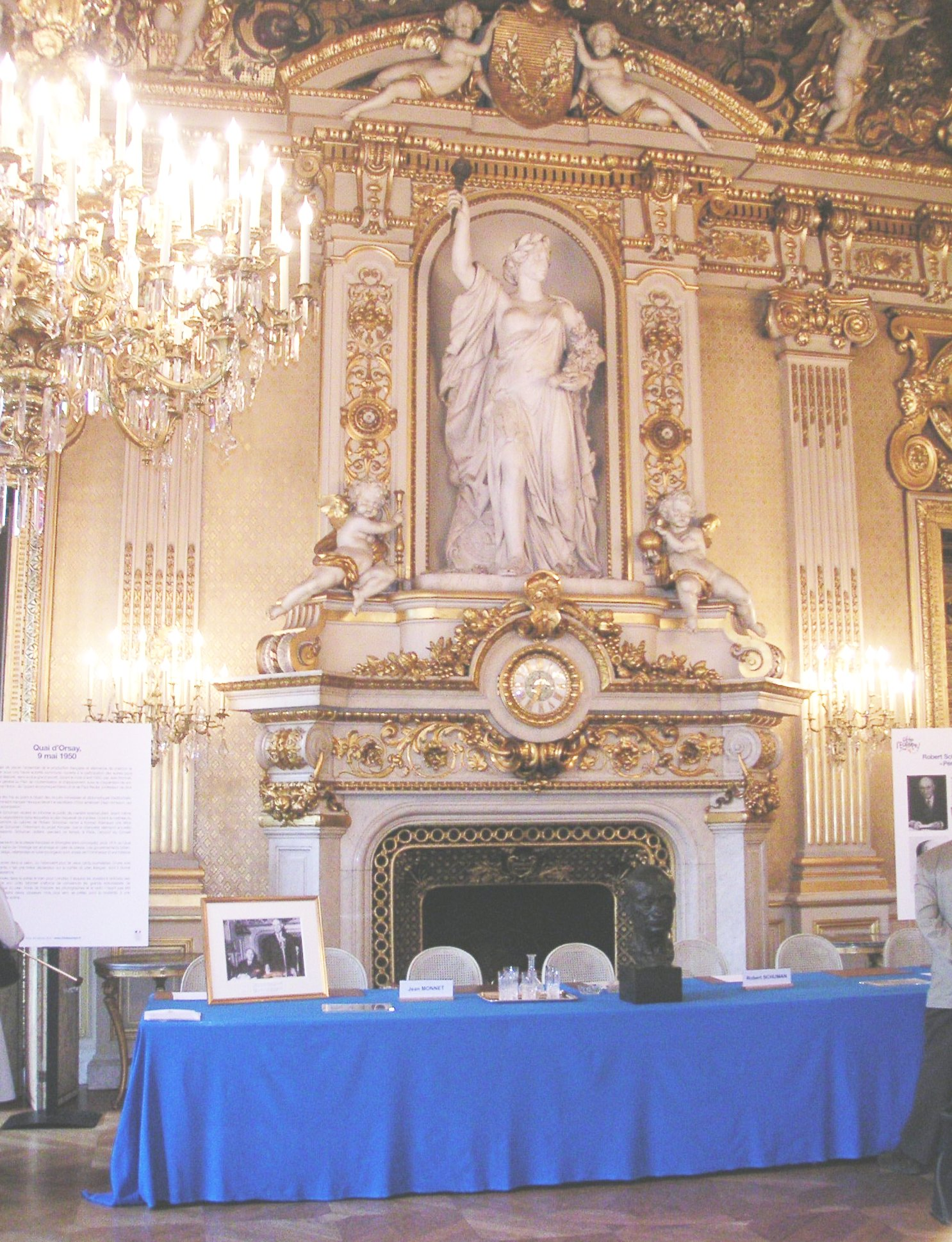
Salon de l'Horloge, where the Schuman Declaration was delivered on May 9, 1950

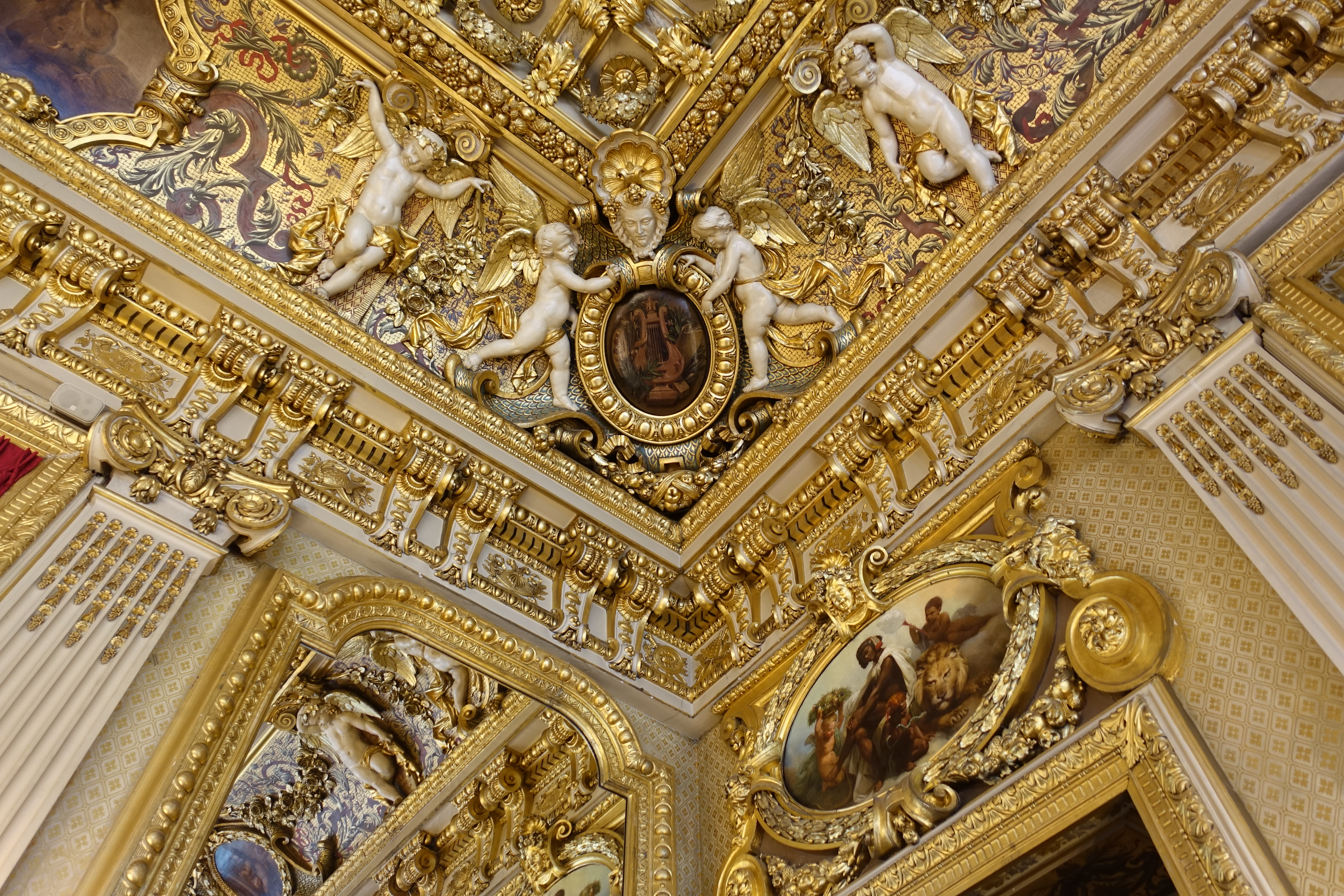
Ceiling of the Salon de l'Horloge

== In film ==
- The French Minister (Quai d'Orsay), a 2013 film directed by Bertrand Tavernier, was partially shot at the Ministry of Foreign Affairs.

== Sources ==
- Bruley, Yves (2012). Le Quai d'Orsay impérial. Histoire du ministère des Affaires étrangères sous Napoléon III (in French). Paris: Éditions A. Pedone. pp. 1–491.
- Destremau, Bernard (1994). Quai d'Orsay derrière la façade (in French). Plon.
- Eldin, Grégoire (2001). L'Europe de Robert Schuman (in French). Presses Paris Sorbonne.
- Hamon-Jugnet, Marie; Oudin-Doglioni, Catherine (1991). Le Quai d'Orsay: l'hôtel du ministre des Affaires étrangères (in French). Éditions du Félin.
- Lanzac, Abel; Blain, Christophe (May 2010). Quai d'Orsay: Chroniques diplomatiques (in French). Vol. 1. Dargaud. pp. 1–104. ISBN 2-205-06132-1.
- Lanzac, Abel; Blain, Christophe (December 2011). Quai d'Orsay: Chroniques diplomatiques (in French). Vol. 2. Dargaud. pp. 1–104. ISBN 2-205-06679-X.
- Leniaud, Jean-Michel (2014). Le Quai d'Orsay - Ministère des Affaires étrangères (in French). Éditions internationales du Patrimoine.
- Lequesne, Christian (2017). Ethnographie du Quai d'Orsay: les pratiques des diplomates français (in French). CNRS Éditions. ISBN 978-2-271-08325-8.
- Librairie Polytechnique Baudry et Cie (1890). Répertoire des carrières de pierre de taille exploitées en 1889 (in French). Librairie Polytechnique Baudry et Cie.
- Ministry of Europe and Foreign Affairs (30 March 2018). "Ministère – Projet de modernisation architecturale du site du Quai d'Orsay « QO 21 »". www.diplomatie.gouv.fr (in French).
- Ministry of Foreign Affairs (2013a). "Le Quai d'Orsay". www.diplomatie.gouv.fr (in French).
- Ministry of Foreign Affairs (2013b). "Making-of du tournage du film "Quai d'Orsay"". www.diplomatie.gouv.fr (in French).
- Rémy, Pierre-Jean (2001). Trésors et secrets du Quai d'Orsay: Une histoire inédite de la diplomatie française (in French). Jean-Claude Lattès.
- Renaud, Franck (2010). Les Diplomates: Derrière la façade des ambassades de France (in French). Nouveau Monde Éditions.
