= Jacques Lacornée =

French architect (1779–1856)

- Born: 20 April 1779; Bordeaux, France
- Died: 5 February 1856 (aged 76); Paris, France
- Citizenship: France
- Education: École des Beaux-Arts
- Occupation: Architect
- Spouse: Hélène Marcion
- Awards: Officer of the Legion of Honour
- Buildings: Palais d'Orsay; Hôtel du ministre des Affaires étrangères Manufacture des tabacs

Jacques Lacornée (20 April 1779 – 5 February 1856) was a French architect. He is best known for his work on the Palais d'Orsay and his association with the building for the French Ministry of Foreign Affairs ("Quai d'Orsay").

== Early life and education ==
Lacornée was born in Bordeaux on 20 April 1779. His father, Pierre Lacornée, was a stonemason. He began his artistic studies in Bordeaux, studying mathematics under Jacques-François Lescan, drawing under Pierre Lacour, and architecture under Richard-François Bonfin. During this time, he won first prizes in drawing from casts and live models. He moved to Paris in 1800 and entered the workshop of the government architect Jacques-Charles Bonnard.

In 1802, he entered the École des Beaux-Arts (then the École spéciale d'architecture). He finished his studies there in 1808. During his time as a student, he won a departmental prize and several medals for projects including a health house, an arsenal, and a prytanée. He was even recommended as a promising student to Napoleon during the Emperor's visit to the school. Although he competed twice for the Prix de Rome, he did not win (got Médaille d'encouragement in 1810); his tendencies toward Renaissance architecture clashed with the Academy's strict preference for Roman antiquity.

== Career ==
Lacornée entered practical architecture in 1810 when he was placed in charge of the initial inspections for the Palais des Relations extérieures (unbuilt, the project eventually turned into Palais d'Orsay). From 1810 to 1818, he served as the first inspector of constructions for the Quai d'Orsay building, executing its layout, plans, and construction details. Over the next several years, he built private houses in Paris, including on the Rue du Bac and the Rue du Faubourg-du-Temple, where his Renaissance-inspired style began to emerge.

Following the death of his teacher Bonnard in 1818, Lacornée was appointed by the Duc de Richelieu to take over the construction of the Palais d'Orsay. That same year, he was appointed inspector general of buildings for the administration of indirect contributions. The Palais d'Orsay, originally started under Napoleon for foreign affairs, had its purpose changed by Louis Philippe I, and Lacornée finally completed the building in 1840 to house the Conseil d'État and the Cour des Comptes.

Throughout the 1820s, Lacornée managed numerous prominent commissions. Between 1820 and 1825, he built houses in the Bois de Boulogne, in Auteuil, and in Bapeaume (in the Seine-Inférieure department). He completed the Château de Sassetot (referred to in some sources as Jasselot) in Seine-Inférieure, repaired the Château de Saint-Just in the Eure department(property of the Duke of Albufera), and prepared the Hôtel Thellusson for the Russian ambassador.

He also built, expanded, or inspected multiple tobacco manufacturing facilities and warehouses across France, including the Manufacture des tabacs du Gros-Caillou in Paris (1827) and other establishments (some while acting as an architect for the Indirect Tax Administration) in Lille, Havre, Lyon, Bordeaux, Strasbourg, Saint-Pol (or Saint-Lô), and Toulouse. Additionally, he designed the tomb of Denis Decrès at Père Lachaise Cemetery.

Lacornée is also closely linked to the design of the Ministry of Foreign Affairs building at 37 Quai d'Orsay (the Hôtel du ministre des Affaires étrangères). A gilded floor plan of the ministry is featured on the side of his tomb.

== Personal life and honors ==
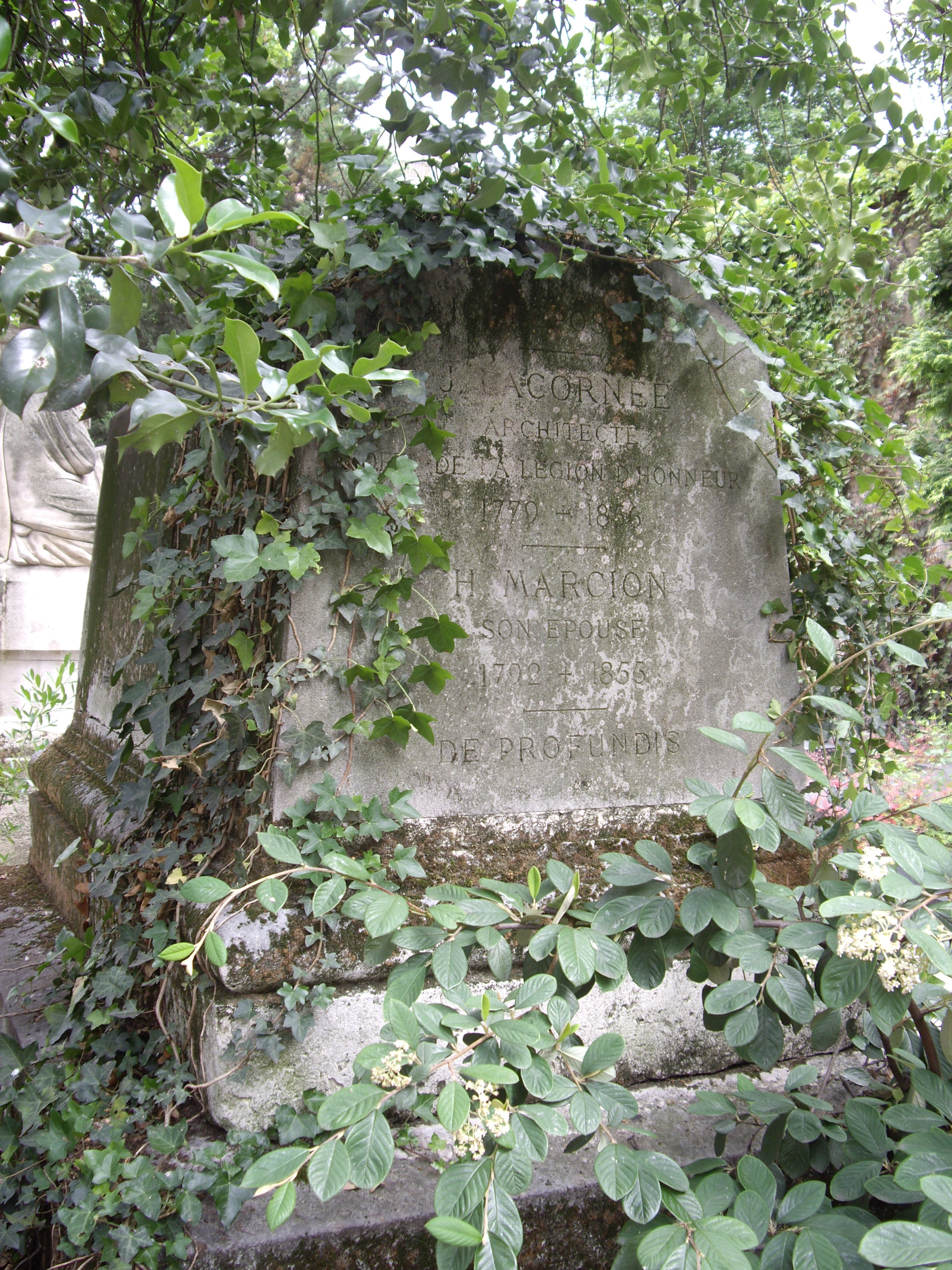
Lacornée's grave at Auteuil Cemetery

During his career, Lacornée lived and worked at 36 Rue de Lille in Paris. He was married to Hélène Marcion, who was born in Paris on 8 September 1792 and died on 24 July 1855. For his architectural achievements, he was made a Knight of the Legion of Honour in 1840, and he was promoted to the rank of Officer in 1854. He died in Paris on 5 February 1856 at his home on the Rue de Vaugirard. He was buried alongside his wife in the Auteuil Cemetery.

Lacornée became a member of Société centrale des architectes français (founded in 1840, now Académie d'architecture) in 1844.

== Sources ==
- Crosnier Leconte, Marie-Laure. "Lacornée, Jacques". AGORHA (in French). Institut national d'histoire de l'art.
- Dezobry, Charles; Bachelet, Théodore (1889). "Lacornée (Jacques)". Dictionnaire général de biographie et d'histoire [General Dictionary of Biography and History] (in French). Vol. 2. Ch. Delagrave. p. 2956.
- Fiori, Ruth (20 April 2012). "Lacornée, Jacques". La France savante (in French). Comité des travaux historiques et scientifiques.
- Lance, Adolphe (1872). "Lacornée, Jacques". Dictionnaire des architectes français [Dictionary of French Architects] (in French). Vol. 2. V. A. Morel. pp. 3–4.
- Poisson, Michel (2009). "Lacornée Jacques (1779–1856)". 1000 immeubles et monuments de Paris : dictionnaire visuel des architectes de la capitale [1000 Buildings and Monuments of Paris: Visual Dictionary of the Capital's Architects] (in French). Parigramme. p. 212.
- Roux, François (1907). "Lacornée, Jacques". Les architectes élèves de l'Ecole des beaux-arts, 1793-1907 [The Architect Students of the École des Beaux-Arts, 1793–1907] (in French). Librairie de la Construction moderne. p. 308.
