= Quai d'Orsay =

Quay in Paris, France

Coordinates: 48°51′46″N 2°18′36″E

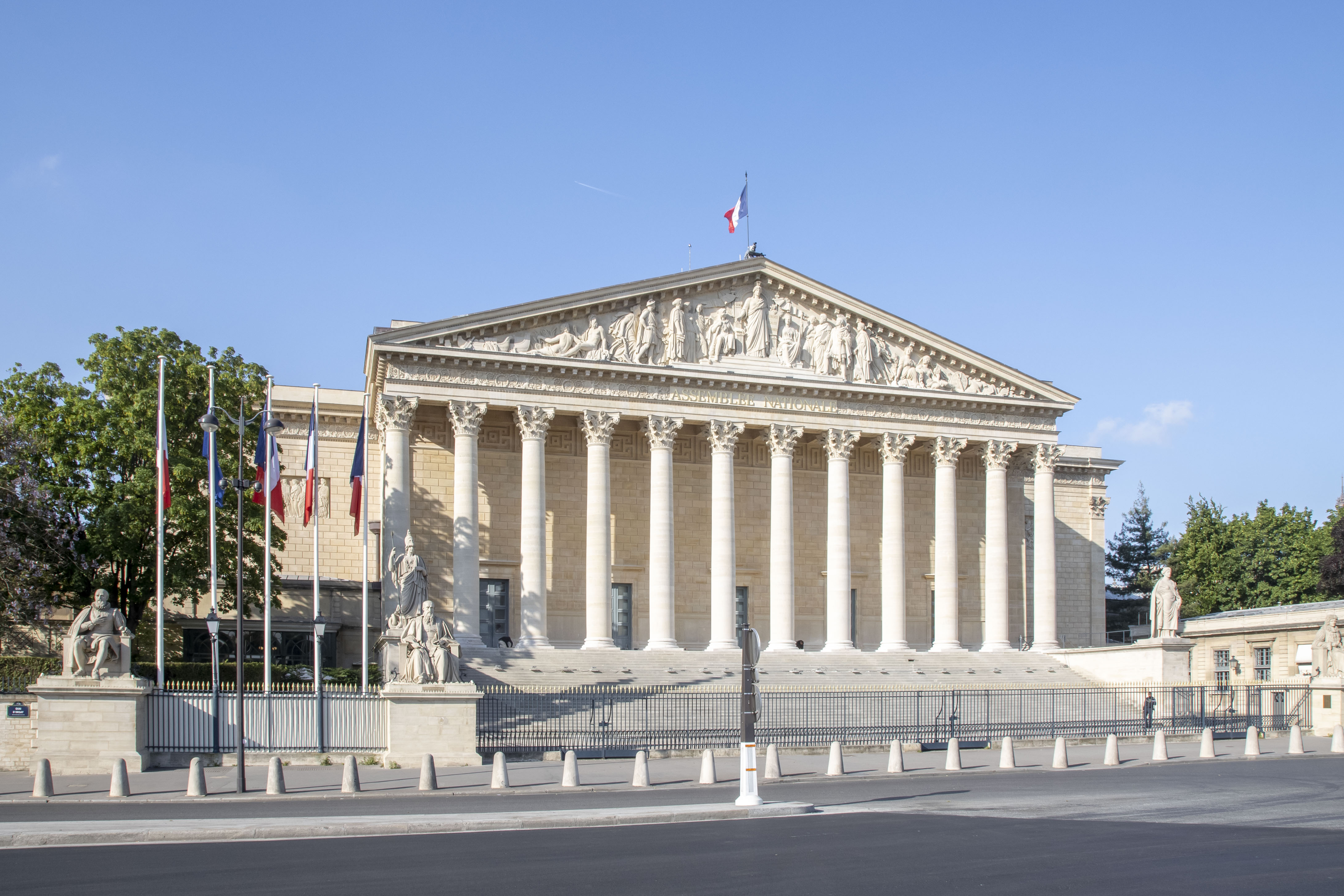
The Palais Bourbon on the Seine, the eastern end of the Quai d'Orsay in the foreground

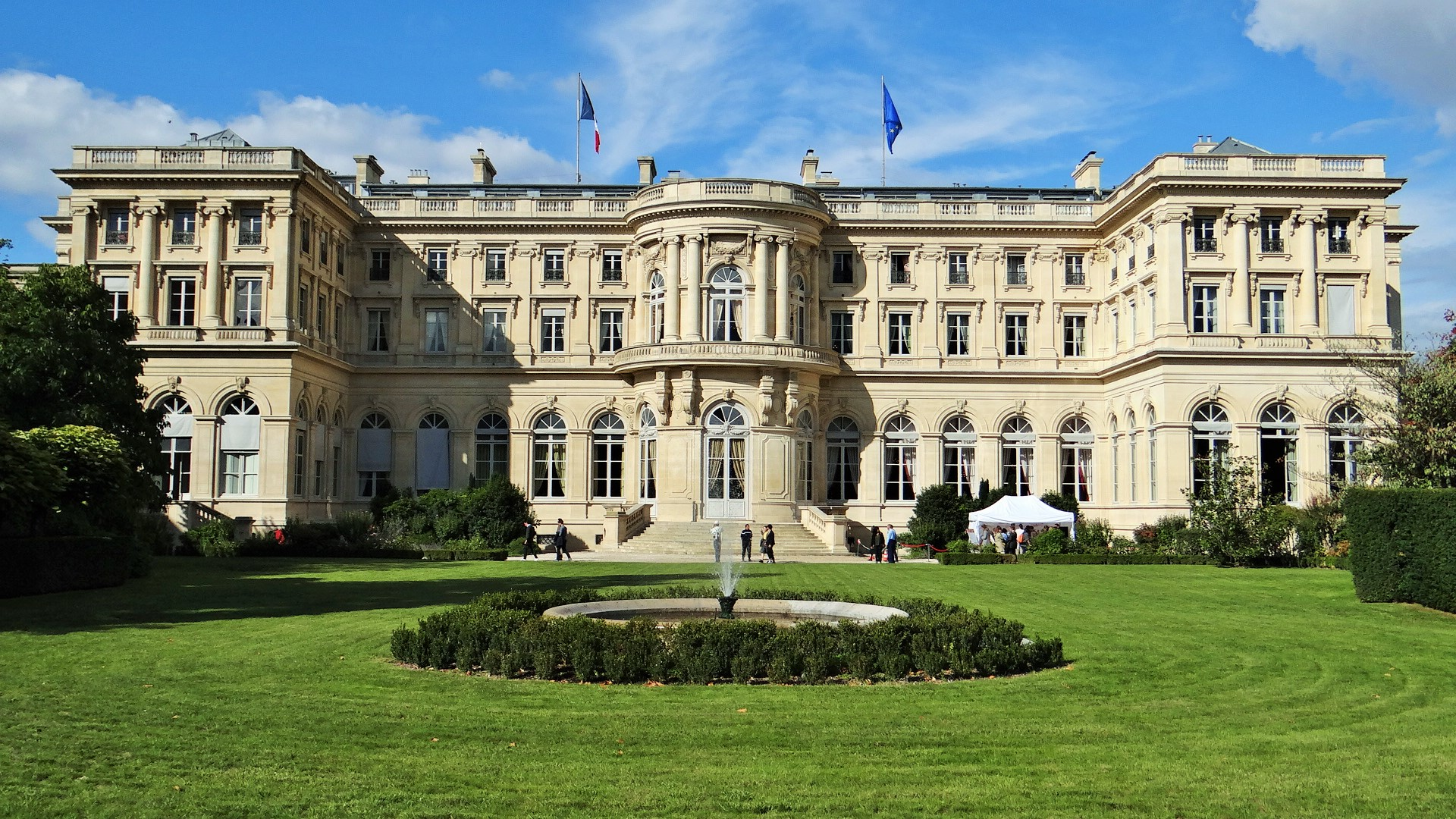
The Ministry of Foreign Affairs building at 37 Quai d'Orsay

The Quai d'Orsay (/ˌkeɪ dɔːrˈseɪ/ KAY dor-SAY, French: [ke dɔʁsɛ]) is a quay in the 7th arrondissement of Paris. It is part of the left bank of the Seine opposite the Place de la Concorde. It becomes the Quai Anatole-France east of the Palais Bourbon, and the Quai Branly west of the Pont de l'Alma.

The seat of the Ministry of Foreign Affairs (the Hôtel du ministre des Affaires étrangères) is located on the Quai d'Orsay, between the Esplanade des Invalides and the National Assembly at the Palais Bourbon; thus the ministry is often called the "Quai d'Orsay" in the press by metonymy. The building housing the Ministry of Foreign Affairs was built between 1844 and 1855 by Jacques Lacornée. The statues of the facade were created by the sculptor Henri de Triqueti (1870). The 1919 Treaty of Versailles was negotiated and written at the Ministry of Foreign Affairs.

== History ==
The Quai d'Orsay (originally until the Rue du Bac in the east) has historically played an important role in French art as a location to which many artists came to paint along the banks of the river Seine. Construction of the wharf proceeded slowly.

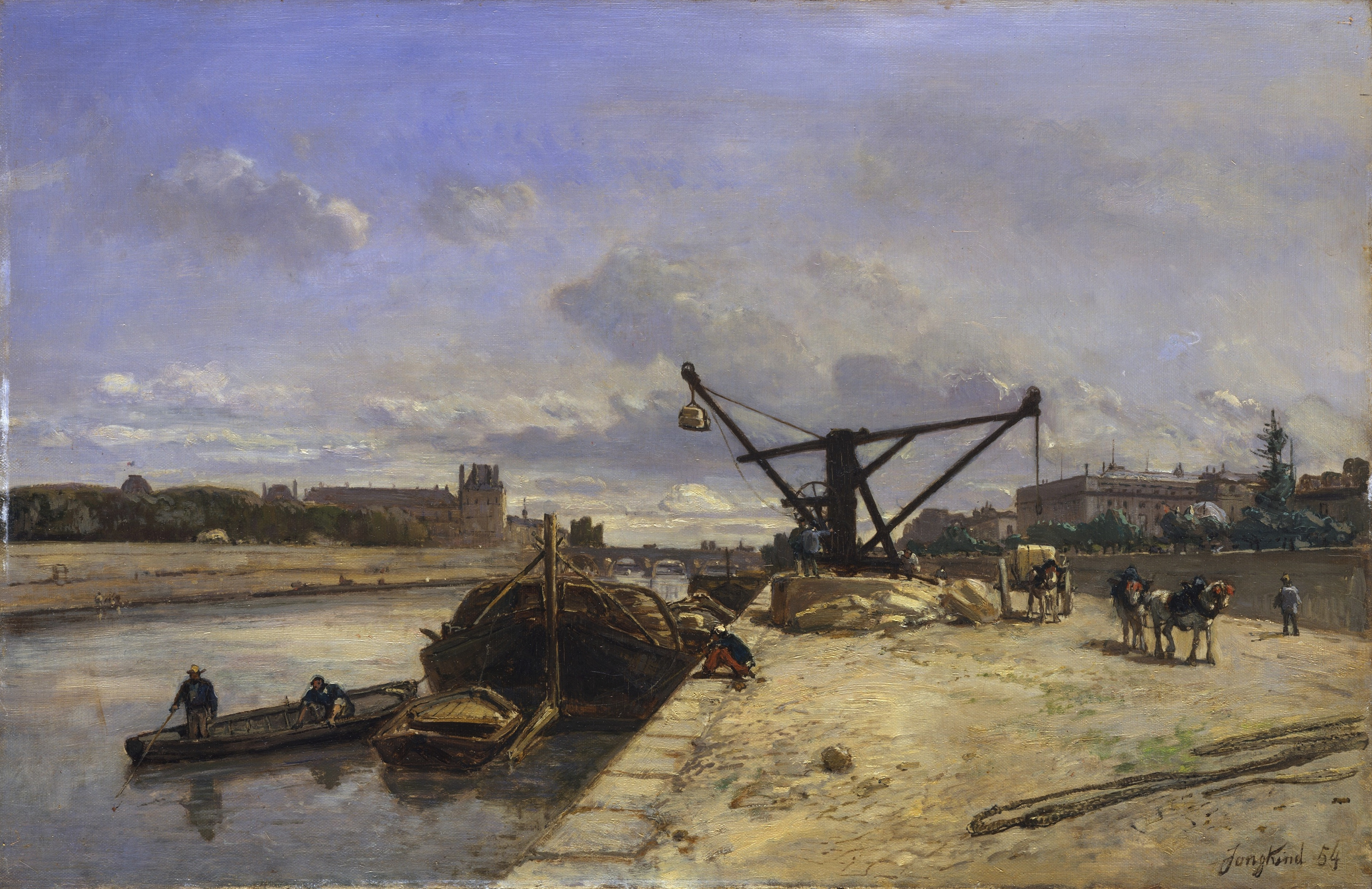
Johan Jongkind, View from the Quai d'Orsay (Vue du quai d'Orsay), 1854. Current-day Quai Anatole-France

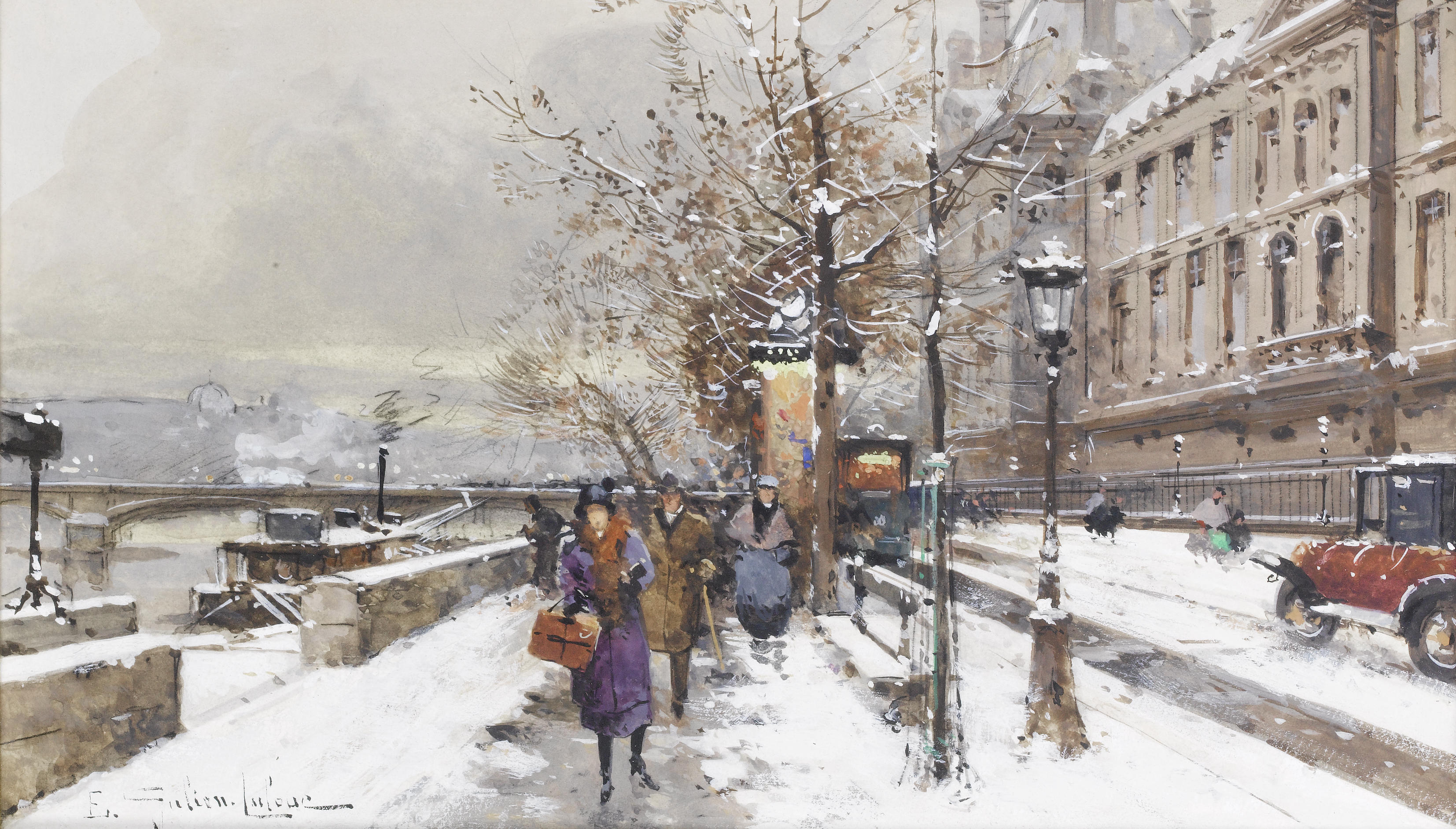
Eugène Galien-Laloue, Quai d'Orsay, Paris, 1920s

The American Church in Paris, located at 65 Quai d'Orsay, was built in 1931.

== Name origin ==
The Quai d'Orsay is named after Charles Boucher d'Orsay, seigneur of Orsay, who was appointed administrator of commerce for the City of Paris from 1700 to 1708. Orsay, Essonne, is a town 21 km (13 mi) southwest of the centre of Paris.
