= SNCF BB 100 =

PO E.101 to E.180 SNCF BB 100
Type and origin
- Power type: Electric
- Builder: Bâtignolles-Châtillon / Oerlikon
- Build date: 1924–25
- Total produced: 80
Specifications
- Configuration
  - UIC: Bo′Bo′
- Gauge: 1,435 mm (4 ft 8 1/2 in)
- Length: 12.580 m (41 ft 3 in)
- Loco weight: 79 tonnes (78 long tons; 87 short tons)
- Electric system/s: 1.5 kV DC Catenary
- Current pickup(s): Pantograph
- Traction motors: 4 × TM 3301
Performance figures
- Maximum speed: 90 km/h (56 mph)
- Power output: 1,136 kW (1,520 hp)
Career
- Operators: Chemin de fer de Paris à Orléans (PO); SNCF
- Numbers: PO: E.101 to E.180; SNCF: BB 101 to BB 180
- Scrapped: between 1967 and 1971

The SNCF locomotives BB 101 to BB 180 were a class of 1500 V DC 4-axle electric locomotives originally built for the Chemin de fer de Paris à Orléans in the 1920s. The class were built as part of an order for 200 locomotives of similar types and were initially used on the newly electrified Paris - Vierzon line before being displaced by the SNCF 2D2 5500 class.

After 1945 the units were used on freight trains between Paris and the area around Toulouse.

== See also ==
- SNCF BB 1-80, SNCF BB 200, SNCF BB 1320, SNCF BB 1420 - similar locomotives, part of the same order of 200 locomotives
