= MIFERMA Class CC 01-21 =

Diesel locomotive class

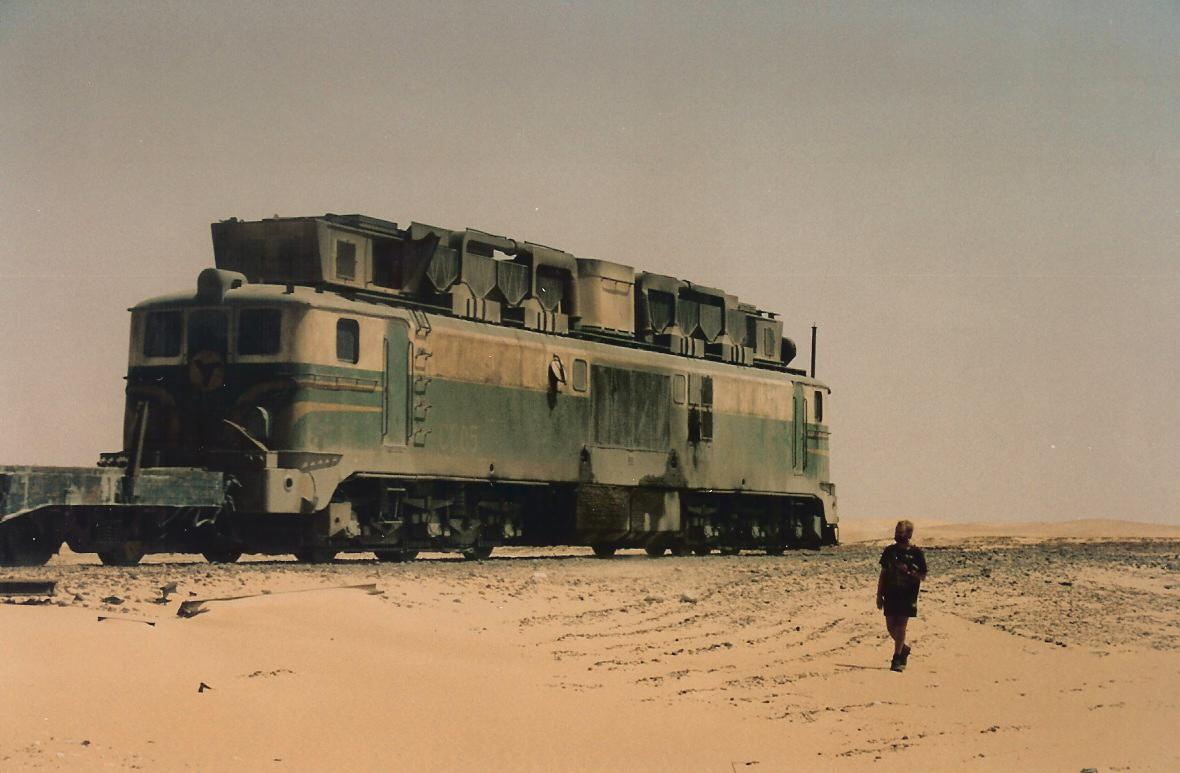
- Locomotive CC 05, photographed in 1994.
Type and origin
- Power type: Diesel
- Builder: Alstom
- Build date: CC 01-11: 1961-62; CC 12-21: 1965
- Total produced: 21
Specifications
- Configuration
  - UIC: Co′Co′
- Gauge: 1,435 mm (4 ft 8 1/2 in)
- Bogies: 2
- Length: 22,732 mm (74 ft 7 in)
- Loco weight: CC 01-11: 126 tonnes (277,800 lb); CC 12-21: 138 tonnes (304,200 lb)
- Fuel type: Diesel
- Prime mover: 2× SACM diesel
- Traction motors: Alsthom-built
- Transmission: Diesel-electric
Performance figures
- Maximum speed: CC 01-11: 70 km/h (43 mph); CC 12-21: 60 km/h (37 mph)
- Power output: 1,030 kW (1,380 hp) each engine
Career
- Operators: Mauritania Railway
- Number in class: 21
- Numbers: CC 01-21
- Locale: Mauritania
- Delivered: 1961–65

The MIFERMA Class CC 01-21 diesel locomotives were built by Alstom in France between 1961 and 1965. The locomotives had been commissioned by the Sociéte Anonyme des Mines de Fer de Mauritanie (MIFERMA), then the owner of the Mauritania Railway, which, since its completion in 1963, has connected the iron ore mine in Zouerate with the port of Nouadhibou, Mauritania.

The CC Class 01-21 locomotives were based upon the SNCF Class CC 65000, a French passenger diesel locomotive also built by Alstom.

Like the CC 65000s, the MIFERMA locomotives were fitted with two diesel engines. However, the MIFERMA locomotives had more powerful versions of the engines. They were also equipped with a roof mounted "skyline casing", which housed special filtration equipment, to deal with the unusually sandy and dusty Saharan atmospheric conditions.

Another change which made them differ from the CC 65000s was their use of different bogie trucks (these being related to the trucks used on the CC 14000s) and a lower carbody with cabs taken from the CC 7100s. The cabs were slightly altered as they featured an extra center cab door on each end.

In 1974, the assets of MIFERMA were nationalized. Thereafter, the Mauritania Railway and its locomotives were owned and operated by the parastatal Société Nationale Industrielle et Minière (SNIM).

Beginning in 1981, the CC Class 01-21s were supplemented by US built EMD SD40-2s. In September 1997, they operated their last iron ore trains and subsequently, they were confined to SNIM's passenger train services.

== Image Gallery ==
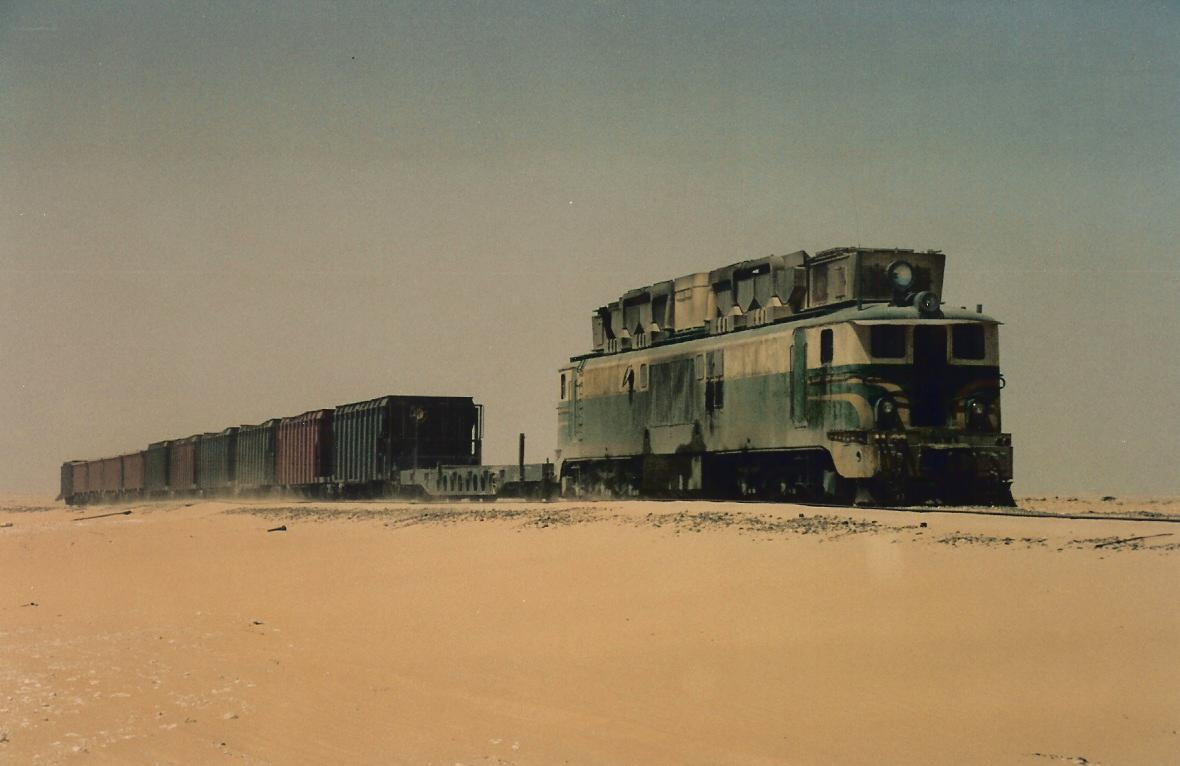
Locomotive CC 05 pulling a track maintenance train in 1994

== See also ==
- History of rail transport in Mauritania
