= SNCF BB 200 =

PO E.201 to E.220 SNCF BB 200
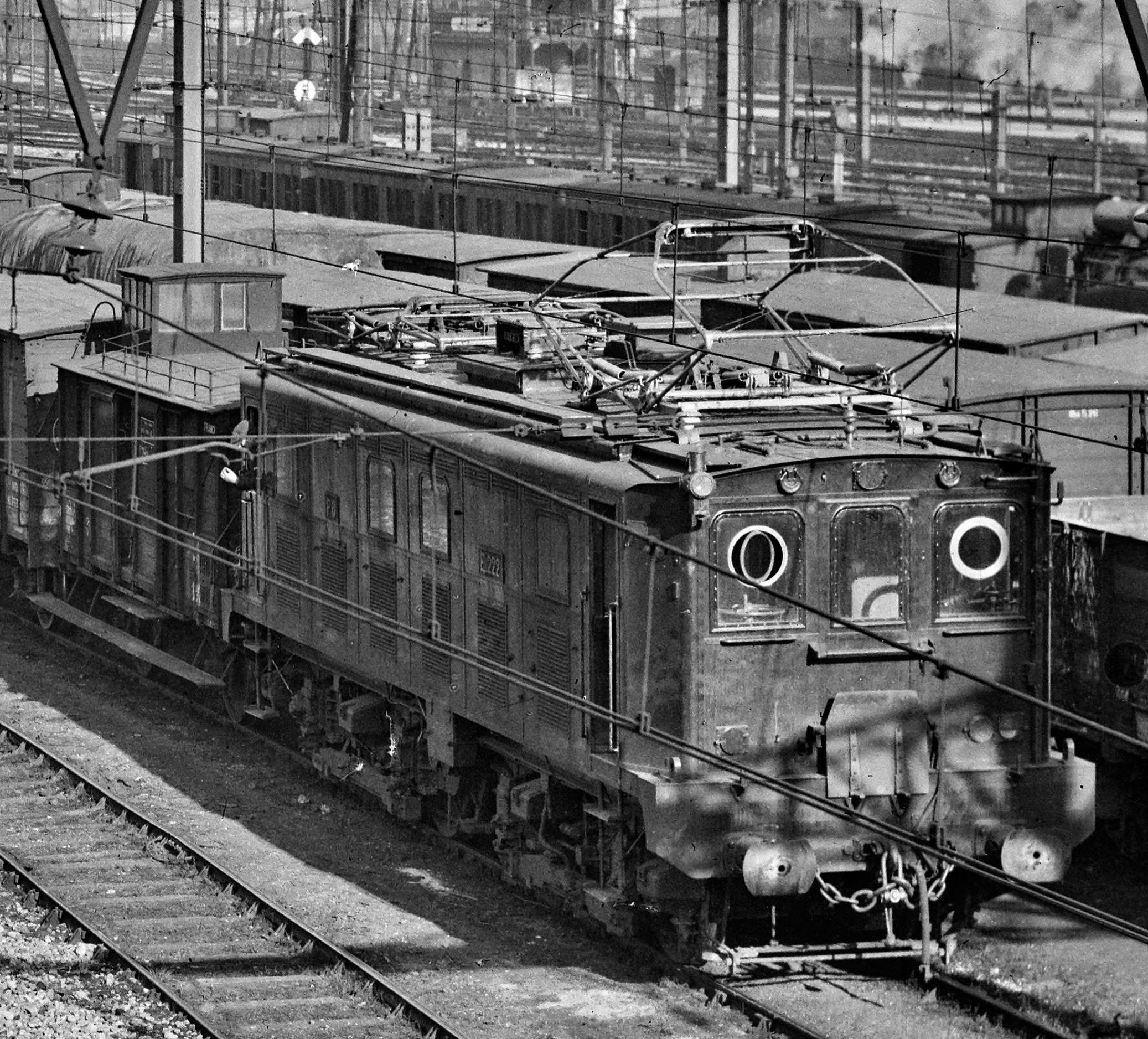
- PO E.222 in Juvisy station, 1928.
Type and origin
- Power type: Electric
- Builder: Société alsacienne de constructions mécaniques / Constructions électriques de France
- Build date: 1924
- Total produced: 20
Specifications
- Configuration
  - UIC: Bo′Bo′
- Gauge: 1,435 mm (4 ft 8 1/2 in)
- Length: 13.100 m (43 ft 0 in)
- Loco weight: 201-204: 78 tonnes 205-220: 77 tonnes
- Electric system/s: 1.5 kV DC Catenary
- Current pickup(s): Pantograph
- Traction motors: 201-204: 4 × DK87A (201-204); 205-220: 4 × LC3500
Performance figures
- Maximum speed: Originally: 90 km/h (56 mph); After 1960s: 70 km/h (43 mph)
- Power output: 1,076 kW (1,440 hp)
Career
- Operators: Chemin de fer de Paris à Orléans (PO); SNCF
- Numbers: PO: E.201 to E.220; SNCF: BB 201 to BB 220
- Scrapped: 201 to 204: 1967; 205 to 220: 1978

The SNCF locomotives BB 201 to BB 220 were a class of 1500 V DC 4-axle electric locomotives originally built for the Chemin de fer de Paris à Orléans in the 1920s.

Originally built for mixed services between Paris and Bordeaux, the locomotives were soon used primarily for freight trains. During the 1960 the locomotives were transferred to shunting duties and the top speed lowered. The first four units were withdrawn in 1967, the remaining units, differed slightly in the electrical components were finally all out of service by 1978.

== See also ==
- SNCF BB 1-80, SNCF BB 100, SNCF BB 1320, SNCF BB 1420 - similar locomotives, part of the same order of 200 locomotives
