= SNCF 2D2 5500 =

French class of electric locomotives

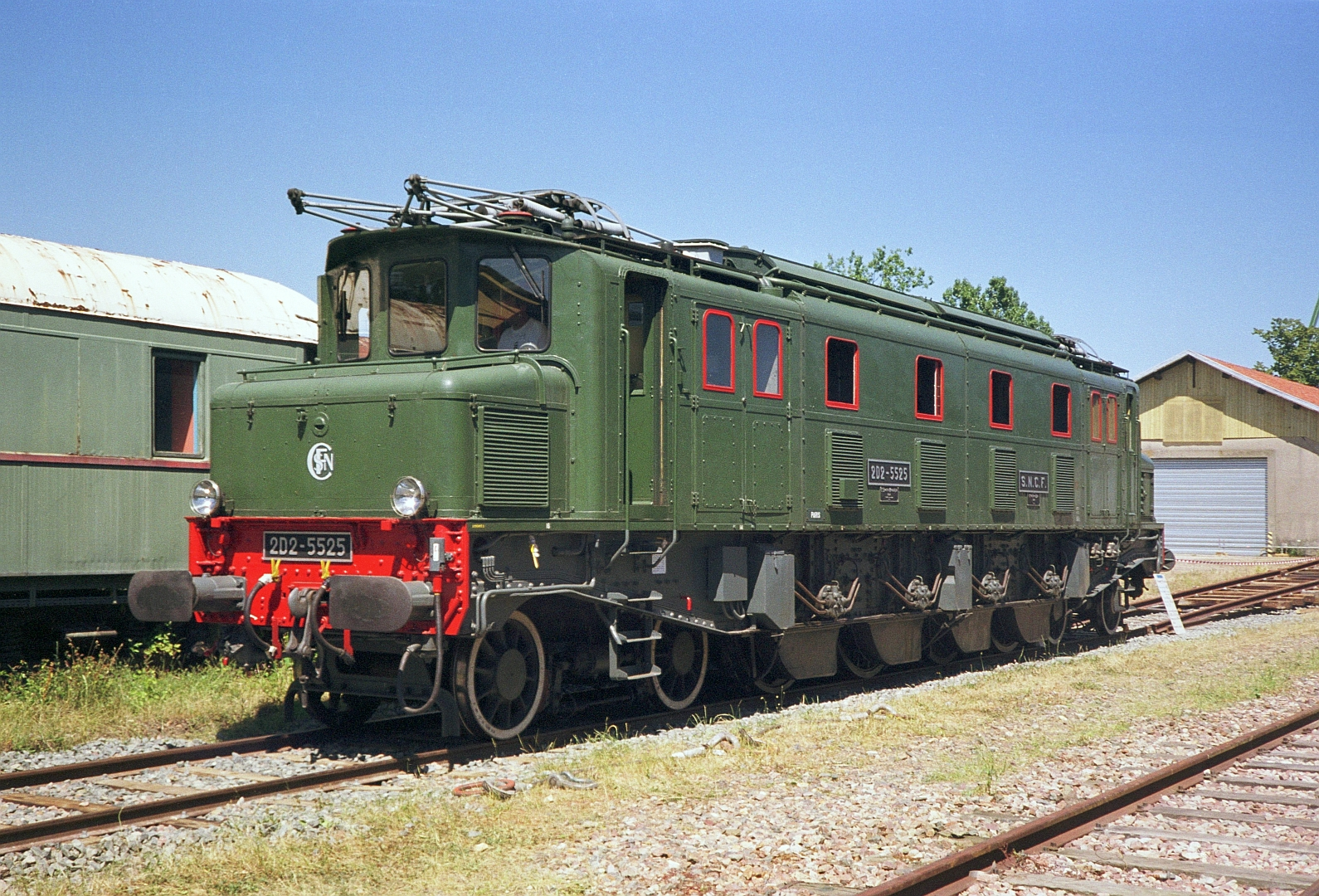
Type and origin
- Power type: Electric
- Builder: CEM - Fives-Lille
- Build date: 1926-1943
- Total produced: 50
Specifications
- Configuration
  - UIC: 2′Do2′
- Gauge: 1,435 mm (4 ft 8 1/2 in)
- Length: 17.78 m (58 ft 4 in)
- Loco weight: 130 tonnes (130 long tons; 140 short tons)
- Electric system/s: 1,500 V DC
- Current pickup: 2× Pantograph
- Traction motors: 4× 1000 hp motors
Performance figures
- Maximum speed: 130 km/h (81 mph), later 140 km/h (87 mph)
- Power output
  - Continuous: 2,625 kilowatts (3,520 hp)
Career
- Operators: Compagnie du chemin de fer de Paris à Orléans, then SNCF
- Number in class: 50
- Numbers: E 500 series with the PO, then SNCF 2D2 500 and 2D2 5503-5537, 5538-5545, 5546-5550
- Nicknames: 'Nez de cochon' (Pig-nose), 'Femme enceinte' (Pregnant lady), 'Waterman' (after Waterman ink jar)
- Delivered: 5503-5537: May 1933, 5538-5545: December 1937, 5546-5550: April 1942
- Retired: 1978 through 1980
- Preserved: 2D2 5516 at Cité du train, 2D2 5525 in excursion service

The 2D2 5500 were electric locomotives operated by the Compagnie du chemin de fer de Paris à Orléans, then SNCF in France, in operation from 1933 to 1980.

== Design and operation ==
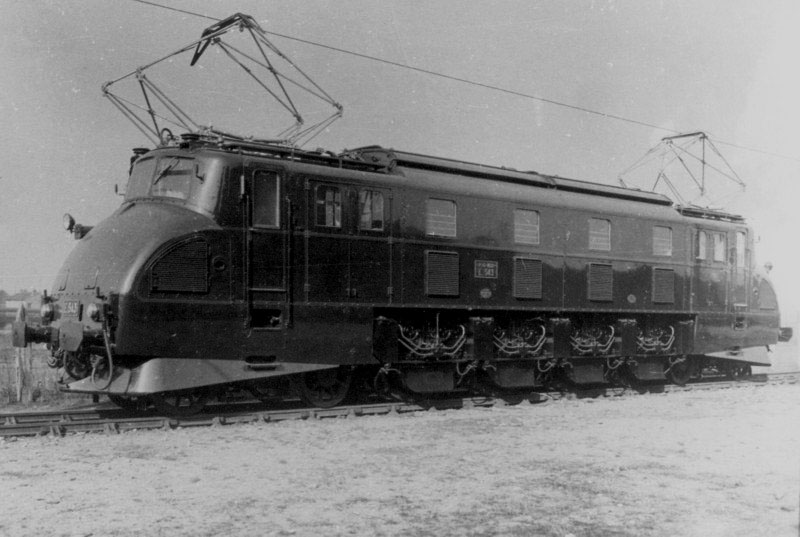
PO-Midi E 543, with the 'enceinte' nose

This class originated on the PO with the two E 501–2 class locomotives of 1925. These had four traction motors, one per axle, driving through Buchli drives and following Swiss practice. They were considered to be more reliable in service than other PO electric locos.

The locomotives operated from a 1,500 V DC catenary with two pantographs, powering four 1,000 horsepower (750 kW) motors. Each locomotive had over 5,000 metres (16,000 ft) of wire for the series-wound electric motors. The driver would start the engines in series, with only 1/4 voltage applied at 350 A. The resistance applied to the engines was progressively removed and the locomotive's speed increased, then switching to series-parallel operation and finally parallel only at 100 kilometres per hour (62 mph). Rheostatic braking was also possible, with the rotors connected in series and shunt resistances across each field winding. Engineers watched the line ahead through a circular frosted lens in the windshield.

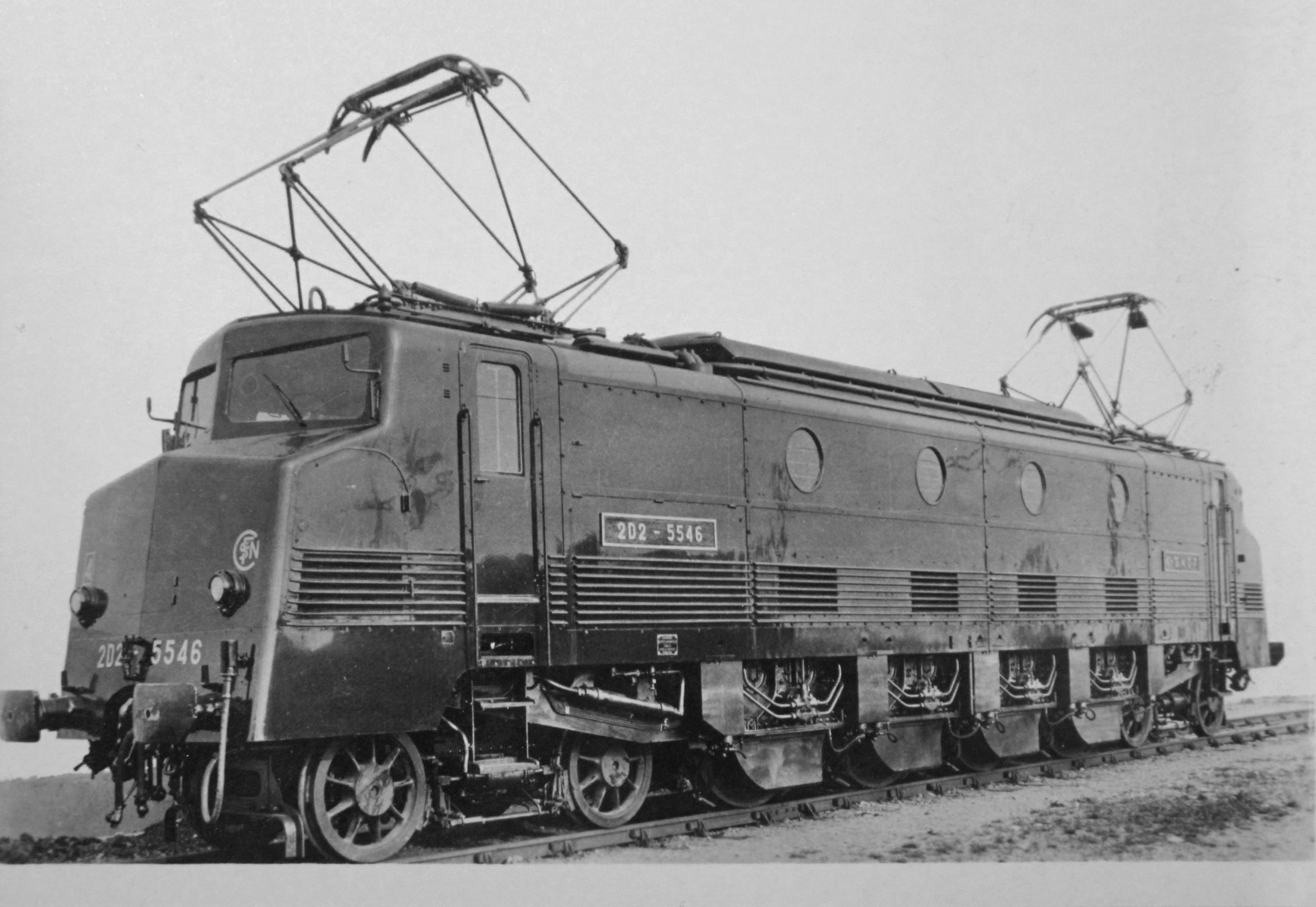
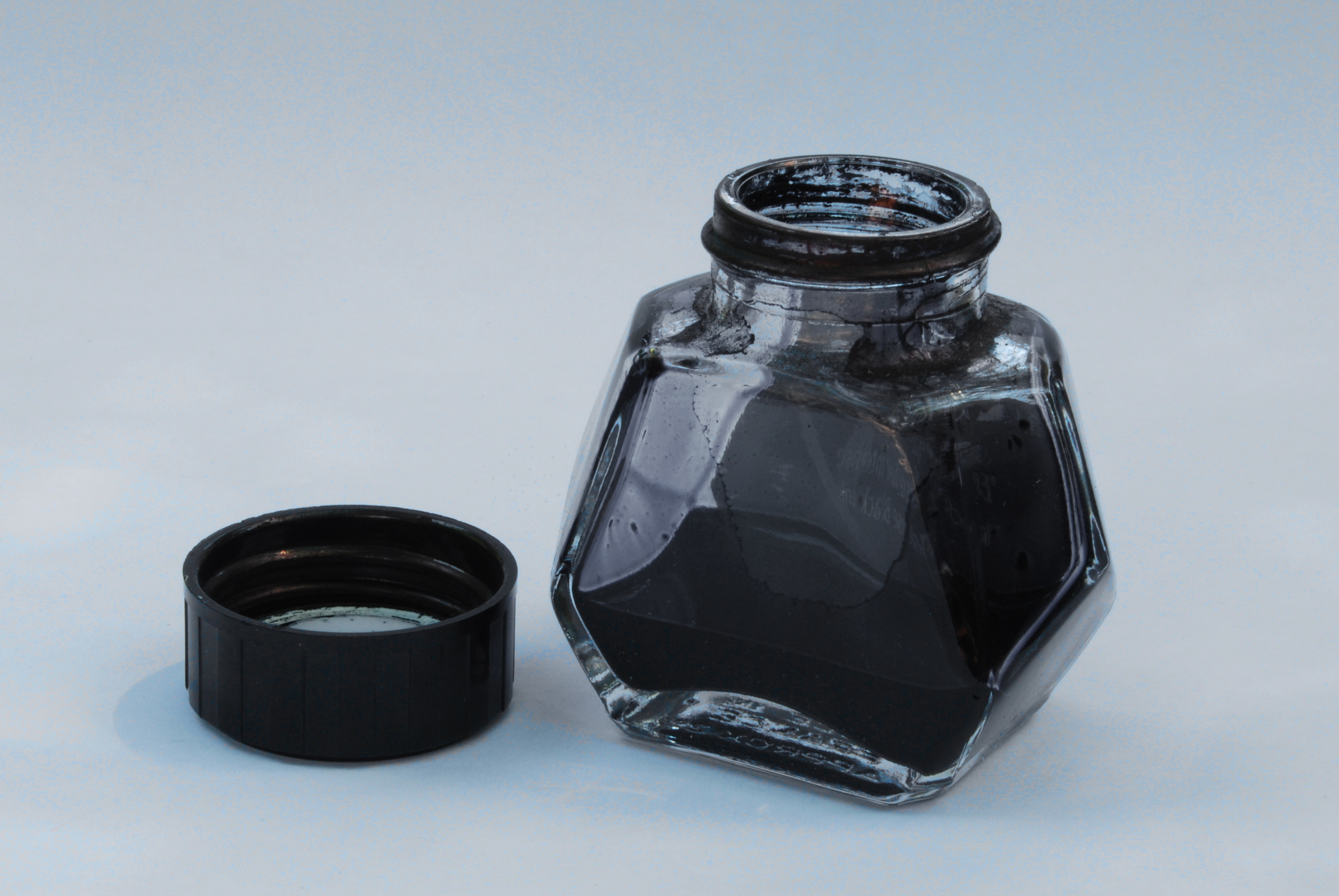
2D2 5546 and the 'Waterman' nose (Note: From ahead, the nose was thought to resemble the creased and sloping end of a Waterman ink jar Waterman ink jar)

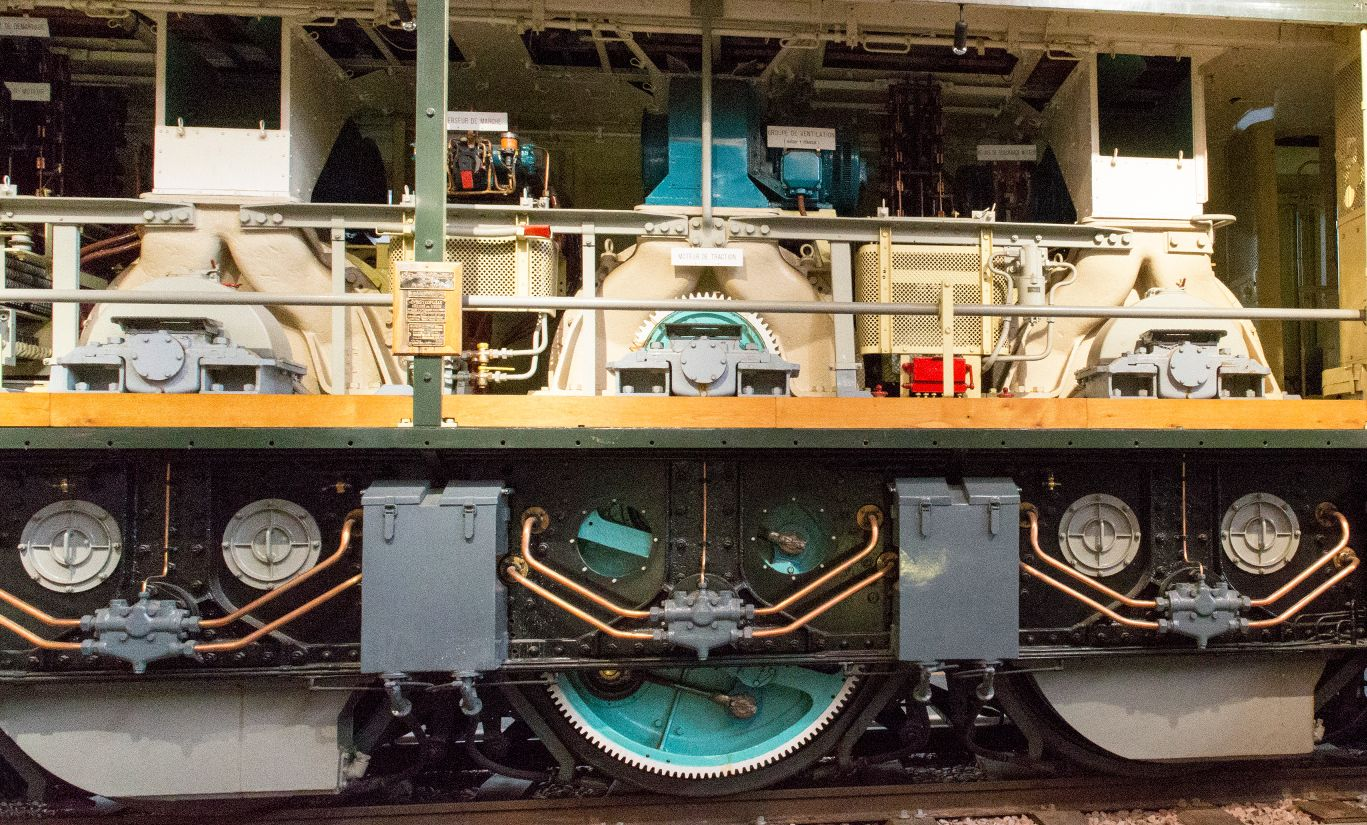
2D2 5516 at the Cité du train museum, with side panels removed to show the traction motors

Thirty five units were ordered by the PO to run on its newly electrified Paris-Orleans-Toulouse/Bordeaux lines, numbers 503 to 537, delivered between 1933 and 1935. The next 15 locomotives were delivered until 1943 to the PO.

The units travelled 220,000 km (140,000 mi) between overhauls. They were known to be very low vibration locomotives.

== Service history ==
A 1946 SNCF film shows 2D2 5550 travelling on the 211 km (131 mi) Paris-Le Mans line, noting that 2D2 units delivered before 1942 had over one million kilometres (620,000 mi) travelled, some over three million kilometres (1,900,000 mi).

Post-war, the Paris-Lyon line was electrified and an improved 2-Do-2 class, the 2D2 9100 was ordered. 35 of these were delivered by 1950, but after this the rigid-framed electric locomotive was replaced by a Co-Co bogie design, the CC 7100.

=== Preservation ===
2D2 5516 is preserved at Cite du Train. It was put in service in July 1933 and retired in 1978, having travelled over 7,800,000 km (4,800,000 mi).
