= SNCF BB 1320 =

Type and origin
- Power type: Electric
- Builder: Société alsacienne de constructions mécaniques (SACM) / Constructions électriques de France (CEF)
- Build date: 1927
- Total produced: 4
Specifications
- Gauge: 1,435 mm (4 ft 8 1/2 in)
- Length: 13.10 m (43 ft 0 in)
- Loco weight: 77 t (76 long tons; 85 short tons)
- Electric system/s: 1500 V DC Catenary
- Current pickup(s): Pantograph
- Traction motors: 4 x DK 87 F (manufacturer CEF)
Performance figures
- Maximum speed: 65 km/h (40 mph)
- Power output: 912 kW (1,223 hp)
Career
- Operators: Chemin de fer de Paris à Orléans (PO); SNCF
- Numbers: PO : E.221 to E.224; SNCF : BB 1321 to BB 1324
- Withdrawn: 1975

The SNCF locomotives BB 1321 to BB 1324 were a class of 1500 V DC 4 axle electric locomotives originally built for the Chemin de fer de Paris à Orléans in the 1920s.

After incorporation into SNCF the locomotives were used for shunting duties after the late 1940s.

== See also ==
- SNCF BB 1-80, SNCF BB 100, SNCF BB 200, SNCF BB 1420 - similar locomotives, part of the same order of 200 locomotives
