= SNCF 2D2 9100 =

French class of express passenger electric locomotives from the 1950s

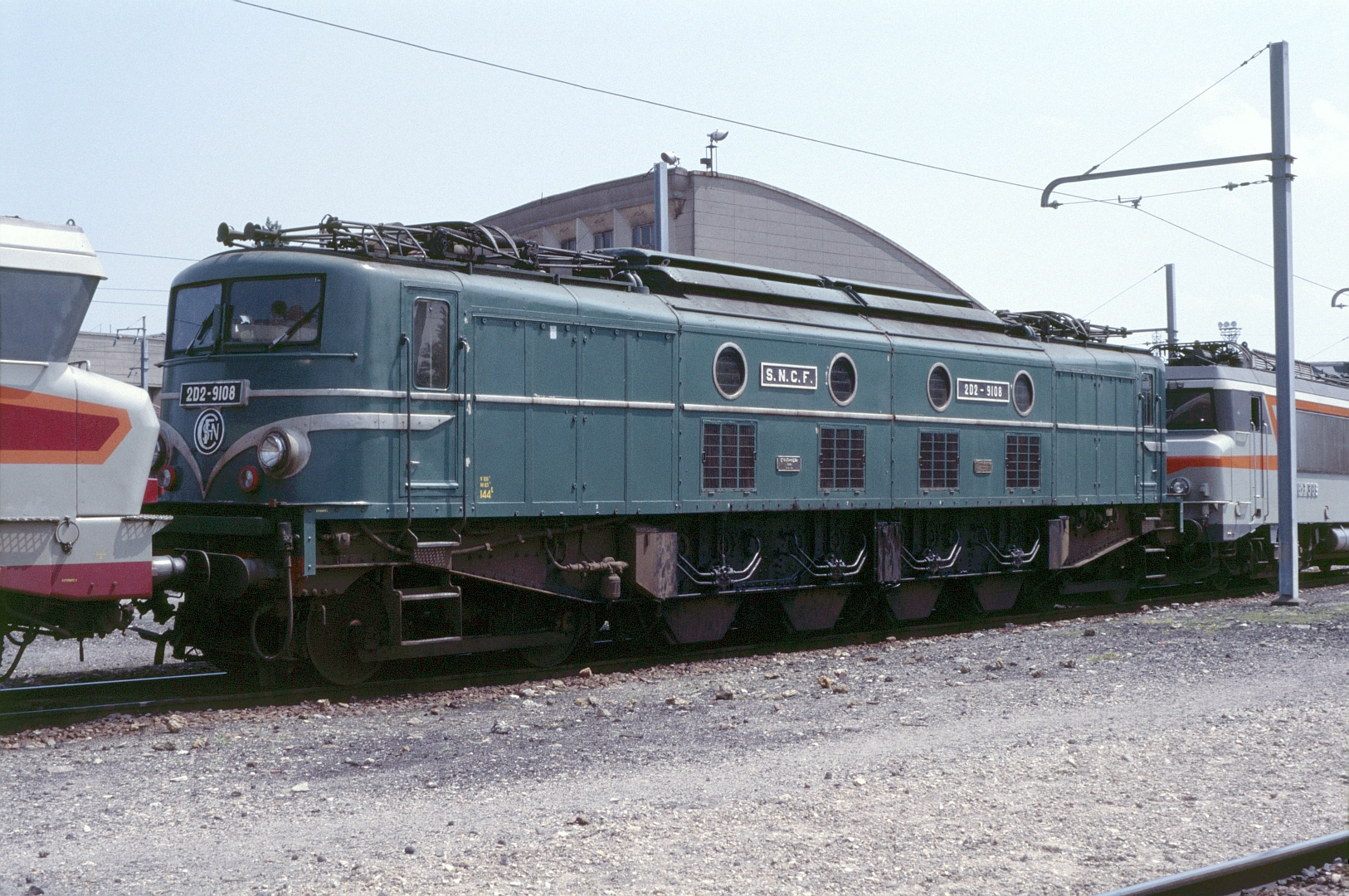
Type and origin
- Power type: Electric
- Builder: CEM - Fives-Lille
- Build date: 1950
- Total produced: 35
Specifications
- Configuration
  - UIC: 2′Do2′
- Gauge: 1,435 mm (4 ft 8 1/2 in)
- Length: 18.04 m (59 ft 2 in)
- Axle load: 20.5 tonnes (20.2 long tons; 22.6 short tons)
- Adhesive weight: 82 tonnes (81 long tons; 90 short tons)
- Loco weight: 144 tonnes (142 long tons; 159 short tons)
- Electric system/s: 1,500 V DC
- Current pickup: 2× Pantograph
- Traction motors: 4× 990 kilowatts (1,330 hp)
Performance figures
- Maximum speed: 140 km/h (87 mph)
- Power output
  - 1 hour: 3,640 kilowatts (4,880 hp)
  - Continuous: 3,280 kilowatts (4,400 hp)
- Tractive effort: 226 kilonewtons (51,000 lb_{f})
Career
- Operators: SNCF
- Number in class: 35
- Numbers: 2D2 9101 – 2D2 9135
- Retired: from 1982

The 2D2 9100 was a class of electric locomotives operated by the SNCF in France, introduced in 1950. They were a development of the pre-war 2D2 5500, built during the post-war push for increased electrification.

== Design ==
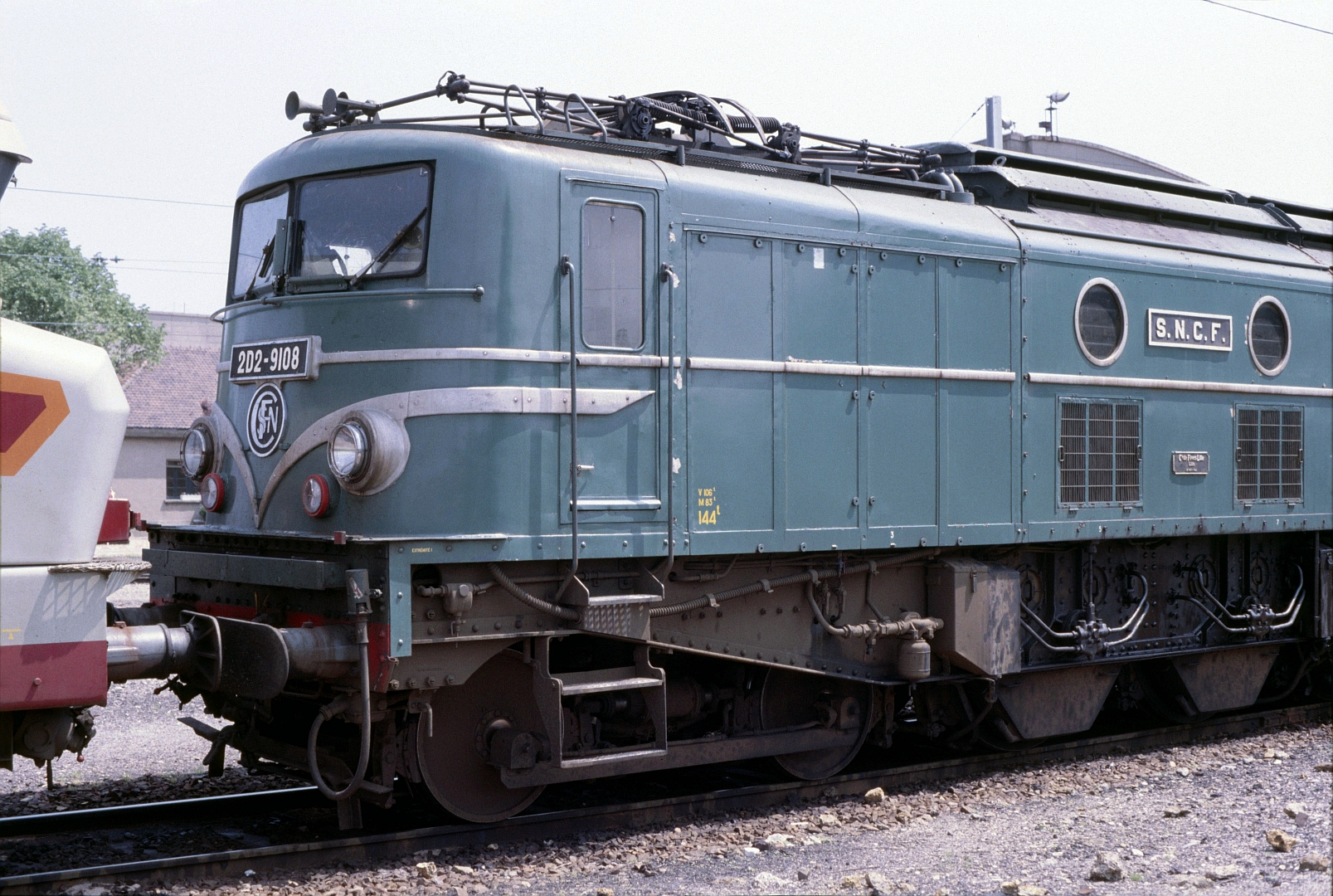
Cab and leading bogie

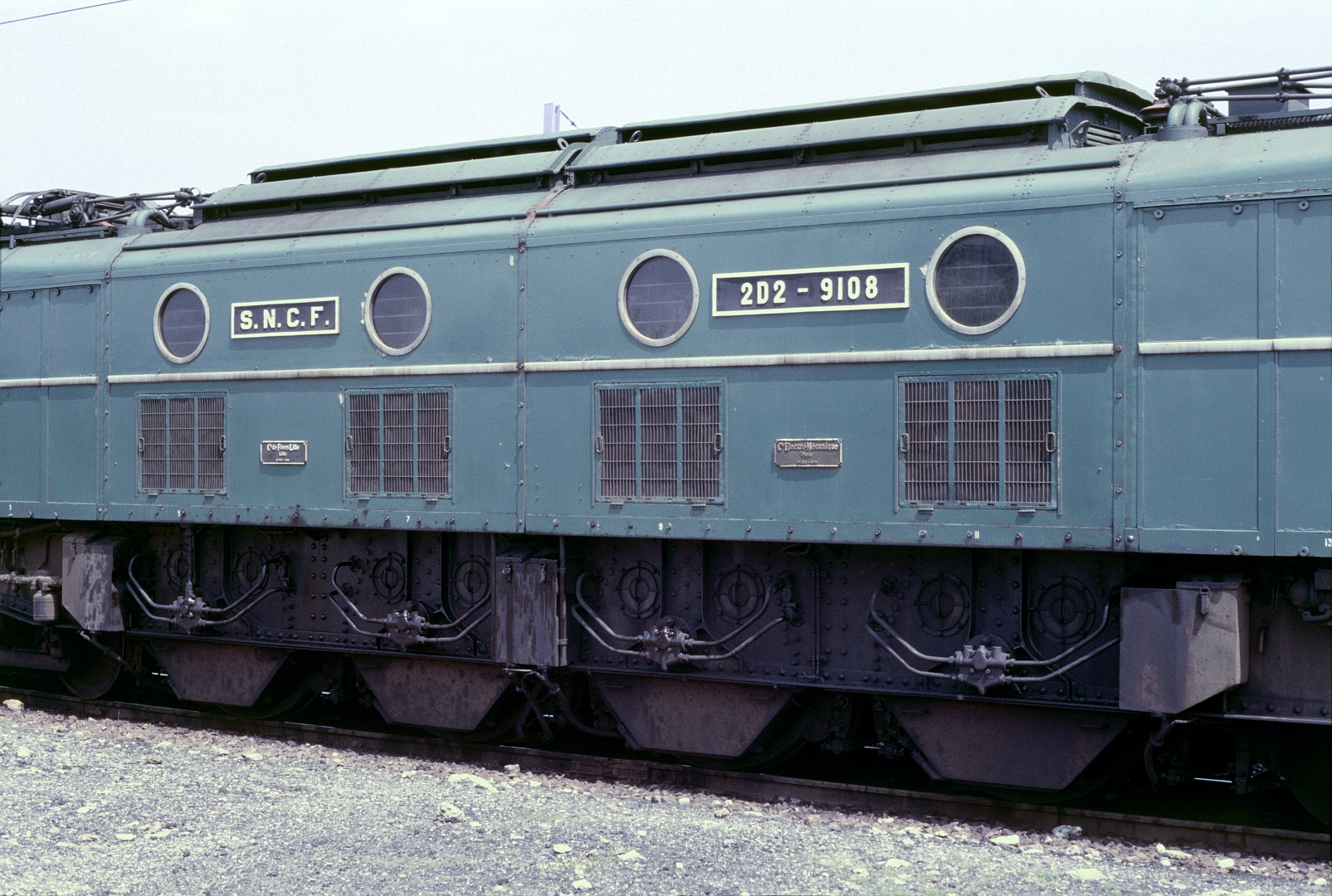
Driving wheels and the Buchli drives

The class was an updated development of the pre-war 2D2 5500 built for the PO-Midi. Mechanically similar, they incorporated a number of improvements to the electrical system to give smoother control. The 9100 represented the ultimate of the rigid-framed electric locomotive; later designs would be bogie designs.

The design had originated on the Paris-Orléans with the two E 501–2 class locomotives of 1925. These had four traction motors, one per axle, driving through Buchli drives and following Swiss practice. They were considered to be more reliable in service than other PO electric locos, such as the 2BB2 400. The original Swiss drive used a single Buchli gear on one side to drive each axle, the French locomotives used a double-sided drive with the Buchli gear duplicated for each end of the axle, which was considered to reduce wear. (Note: The belief was not merely that the two gears shared the load, thus the rate of wear, but also that it reduced the effects of torsion in the shaft. A similar effect was noted with the phasing gears of the early Napier Deltic engine.)

The locomotives operated from a 1,500 V DC catenary with two pantographs, powering four 990 kW (1,330 hp) traction motors. Like most other 1,500 V DC locomotives, they used four motors, with speed control by series-parallel switching and fine control by field-weakening resistances. Improvements to the design of the motors, particularly the compensating windings, allowed finer steps of resistance to be used, so that the jerk when switching steps was only a fifth of what it had been previously. This also improved their high-speed performance, giving a top speed of 140 km/h (87 mph).

Like other French locomotives of this era, they were not equipped with a driver's seat at first, merely a simple saddle. This was replaced by a standing seat when the VACMA 'dead man's pedal' was introduced in 1963, then by a jump seat in 1973.

== Service history ==
Post-war, the Paris-Lyon line was electrified and more fast express passenger locomotives were required. 35 of this class were built from 1950, from an anticipated demand for around 100. The first was delivered by 2 March 1950 and the last on 31 July 1951.

The initial production was cut short in favour of a Co-Co bogie design, the CC 7100. These were introduced from 1952 and, thirty years later, would go on to replace the 2D2 9100. Like the original 2′Do2′ design, this was inspired by Swiss achievements in high-speed chassis design, in this case with the Re 4/4^{I} and then the Ae 4/4, which established bogie locomotives as being capable of running at express speeds.

In their final years, they were based at Lyon-Mouche and used for freight services.

Withdrawals began in 1982 and they were all withdrawn by 1987.

=== Preservation ===
A single example, 2D2 9135, the last of the class, has been preserved. It is listed as a monument historique by the AFCL association and has been at the Laroche - Migennes depot since 2014.

A second locomotive, 2D2 9134, was preserved at Saint-Étienne, but was scrapped in 2008.
