= SNCF BB 1420 =

Type and origin
- Power type: Electric
- Builder: Société alsacienne de constructions mécaniques (SACM); Constructions électriques de France (CEF)
- Build date: 1927-1929
- Total produced: 15
Specifications
- Gauge: 1,435 mm (4 ft 8 1/2 in)
- Length: 12.754 m (41.84 ft)
- Loco weight: 74.9 t (73.7 long tons; 82.6 short tons)
- Electric system/s: 1500 V DC Catenary
- Current pickup(s): Pantograph
- Traction motors: 4 x DK 87 F (manufacturer CEF)
Performance figures
- Maximum speed: 90 km/h (56 mph)
- Power output: 912 kW (1,223 hp)
Career
- Operators: Chemin de fer de Paris à Orléans (PO); SNCF
- Numbers: PO : E.225 to E.240; SNCF : BB 1425 to BB 1440
- Withdrawn: 1974

The SNCF locomotives BB 1425 to BB 1440 were a class of 1500 V DC 4 axle electric locomotives originally built for the Chemin de fer de Paris à Orléans in the 1920s.

The locomotives were used on mixed trains on lines between Paris and Bordeaux, after incorporation into SNCF the locomotives were used for shunting duties.

== See also ==
- SNCF BB 1-80, SNCF BB 100, SNCF BB 200, SNCF BB 1320 - similar locomotives, part of the same order of 200 locomotives
