= Guelb El Aouj =

Open-pit iron mine in Northern Mauritania

The Guelb El Aouj mine is an open-pit iron mining operation located in the Tiris Zemmour region in Northern Mauritania.

== Background ==
Located approximately 32km northwest of the main iron ore mining town of Zouérate and approximately 26km from the mainline railway, which is owned and operated by Mauritania Railways serving the Lebtheinia mine

In 2004, a feasibility study by Le Groupe Banque européenne d’investissement (Groupe BEI) related to a possible industrial project: “El Aouj S.A.”, a Mauritanian subsidiary of Sphere Investments Limited (Australia). In 2006, Sphere Investments announced stage 2B of the bankable feasibility study (BFS) relating to the Guelb el Aouj DR pellet project in Mauritania. The BFS was focused only on the Guelb el Aouj East Deposit. In 2010, mining equipment supplier F.L.Smidth was awarded a contract worth approximately $40 million (USD) from the Mauritanian La Société Nationale Industrielle et Minière (SNIM) for the supply of a wet concentrator package and a train load out package for the Guelb el Aouj facility.

Industries Qatar was a minority shareholder until the 2008 Mauritanian coup d'état. In 2013, Glencore acquired Xstrata, becoming the new owner of El-Aouj. Glencore negotiated a $1 billion (USD) deal with the Société Nationale Industrielle et Minière to use the railroad system from the mine to the coast. By 2025, the Société Nationale Industrielle et Minière had gathered $512 million (USD) in international aid to connect El-Aouj to the coastal Nouadhibou railroad.
