= SNCF Class CC 65000 =

French passenger diesel locomotive

SNCF 060.DB SNCF CC 65000
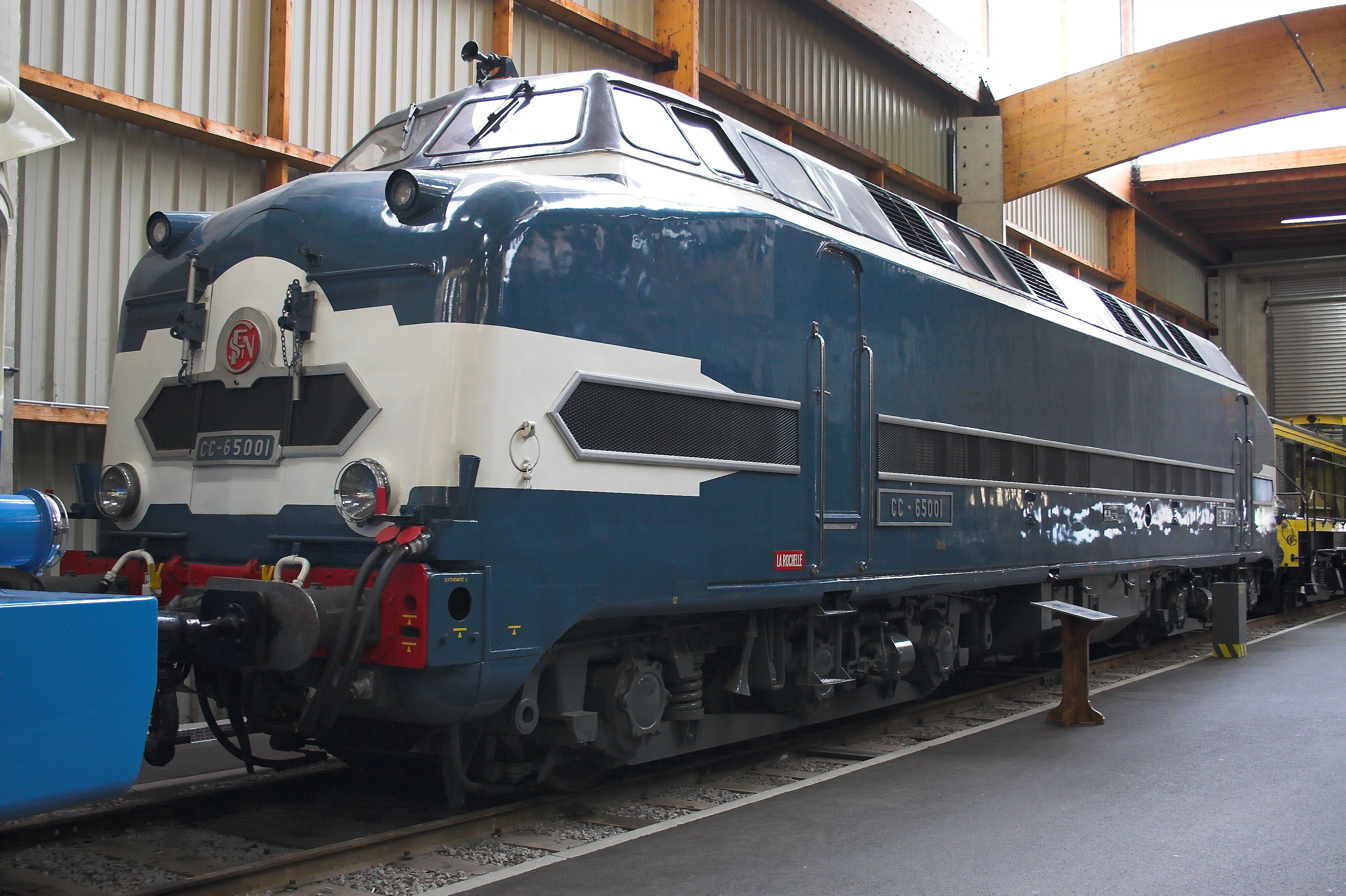
- CC 65001 is preserved at the Cité du Train, Mulhouse
Type and origin
- Power type: Diesel-electric
- Builder: Alsthom, CAFL, SACM
- Total produced: 20
Specifications
- Configuration
  - UIC: Co′Co′
- Gauge: 1,435 mm (4 ft 8 1/2 in)
- Length: 19,814 mm (65 ft 1/8 in)
- Loco weight: 112 tonnes (110 long tons; 123 short tons)
- Fuel type: Diesel
- Prime mover: SACM MGO VSHR, 2 off
- Engine type: V12
- Traction motors: Alsthom TA 643 A1, 180 volt, force ventilated, 6 off
Performance figures
- Maximum speed: 80 or 130 km/h (50 or 81 mph)
- Power output
  - Continuous: 970 kW (1,320 CV; 1,300 hp)
Career
- Operators: SNCF
- Numbers: 060.DB.1 – 060.DB.20; CC 65001 – CC 65020
- Nicknames: Sous-marin (Submarine), Juke-box (Jukebox)
- Delivered: 1957–58
- Retired: 1981–1988

The SNCF Class CC 65000 diesel locomotives were built by Alsthom, CAFL and SACM, with 20 examples being built between 1956 and 1958. They were most often used in the triangle Nantes-Tours, Tours-Bordeaux and Bordeaux-La Rochelle-Nantes.

The series was withdrawn from service between 1981 and 1988 but two examples were preserved: CC 65001 at the Cité du Train in Mulhouse and CC 65005 by the Train des Mouettes.
