= Askaf =

Iron ore prospect in Mauritania

Coordinates: 22.384104°N 12.6989692°W

Askaf is an iron ore prospect in Mauritania.

== Railway ==
The deposit straddles the SNIM railway 598 km from its port of export.

In 2014, Glencore Xstrata paid $1 billion to SNIM for access to that company's rail and port infrastructure, however, after iron ore prices dropped 40% in 2018, Glencore pulled out of the deal.

== See also ==
- Railway stations in Mauritania
- Iron ore in Africa
