= Mauritania Railway =

National railway of Mauritania

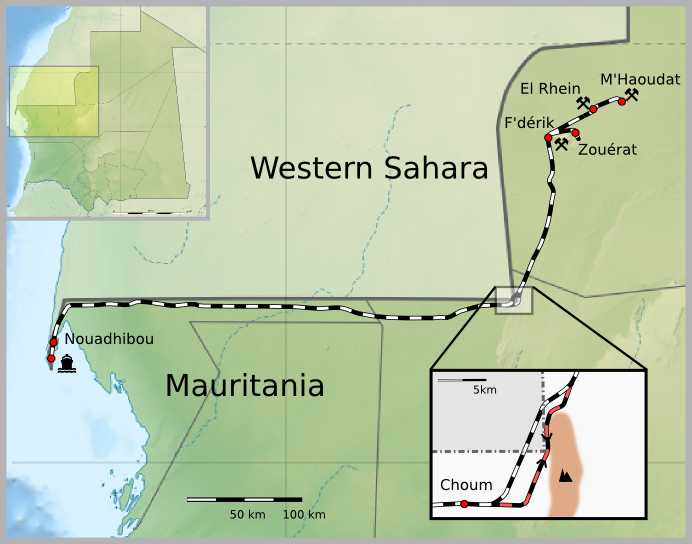
- Map of Mauritania Railway

Technical
- Line length: 704 km (437 mi)
- Track gauge: 1,435 mm (4 ft 8 1/2 in) standard gauge

The Mauritania Railway is the national railway of Mauritania. Construction of the line began in 1960, with its opening in 1963. It consists of a single, 704 km (437 mi) railway line linking the iron mining center of Zouérat with the port of Nouadhibou, via Fderik and Choum. The state agency Société nationale industrielle et minière (SNIM) controls the railway line.

Since the closure of the Choum Tunnel, a 5 km (3.1 mi) section of the railway cuts through the Polisario Front-controlled part of the Western Sahara (21.354867°N 13.012644°W).

== History ==
The line was a success and provided a major portion of Mauritania's GDP; as a result, the line was nationalized in 1974. Following Mauritania's annexation of southern Western Sahara in 1976, the line came under constant attack by Polisario militia, effectively putting the line out of use and thereby crippling Mauritania's economy. This played a major role in prompting the army to overthrow Mauritanian President Moktar Ould Daddah in 1978, followed by a withdrawal from Western Sahara the following year. With the line now secure, repairs were conducted and trains starting using it once again in the early 1980s. This railway is unusual for its usage of the Soviet type coupler SA-3, which is quite rare in non-ex-Soviet countries.

== Traffic ==
Trains on the railway are up to 3 km (1.9 mi) in length, making them among the longest and heaviest in the world. They consist of 2 diesel-electric EMD locomotives, 200 to 210 cars each carrying up to 84 t (83 long tons; 93 short tons) of iron ore, and 2–3 service cars. The total traffic averages 16.6 Mt (16,300,000 long tons; 18,300,000 short tons) per year.

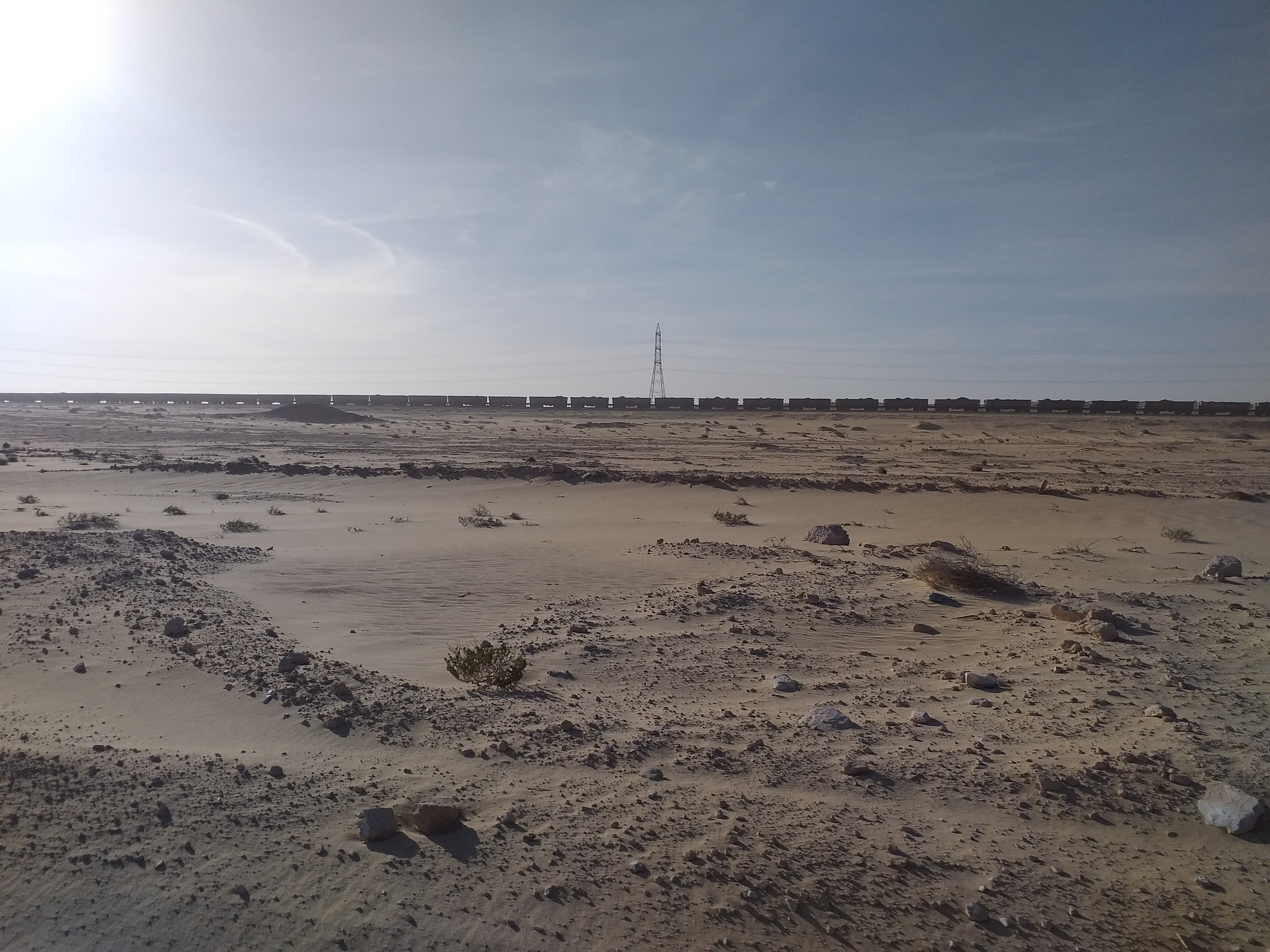
Iron ore cars on a typical train

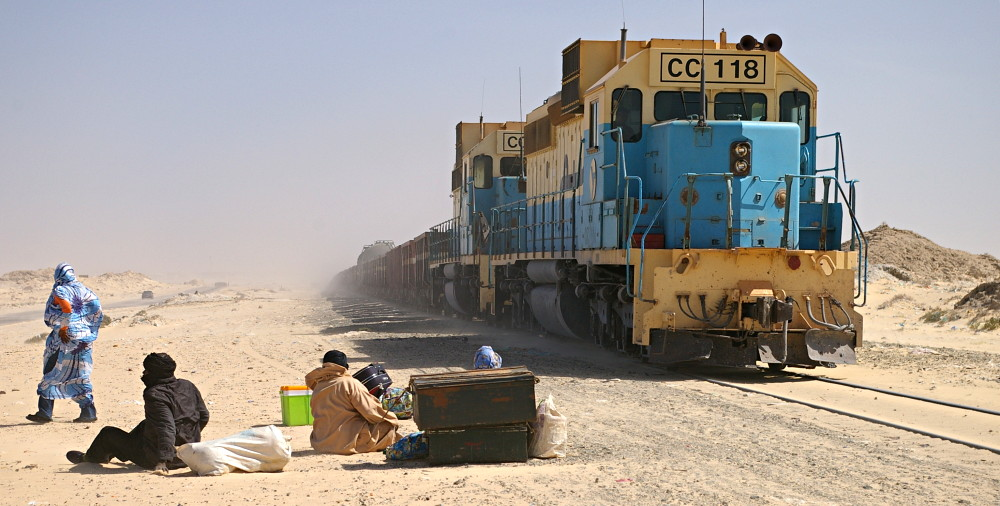
Mauritania Railway train at the station in Nouadhibou

Passengers are also occasionally transported by train; these services are managed by an SNIM subsidiary, the société d'Assainissement, de Travaux, de Transport et de Maintenance (abb. ATTM). Passenger cars are sometimes attached to freight trains, but more often passengers simply ride atop the ore hopper cars freely. Passengers include locals, merchants, and occasionally some adventure tourists. Conditions for these passengers are incredibly harsh with daytime temperatures exceeding 40 °C, night-time temperatures approaching freezing, and death from falls being common.

In January 2019, the railway resumed tourism after a ten-year hiatus; part of the track ran through a forbidden tourist area. One of the stops on the tourist route is an iron mine. The tourist route is typically operated by a locomotive carrying two passenger carriages.

== Locomotives ==
In October 2010, SNIM ordered six EMD SD70ACS locomotives, which featured a pulse filtration system, movable sand plows, EM2000 control system and FIRE display system together with similar modifications to allow for operations in high temperatures.

Prior to this the railway had operated US-built EMD SDL40-2 locomotives, also with special modifications to deal with operating in dusty and high-temperature environments, which themselves were the replacement for twenty-one MIFERNA Class CC locomotives which had been custom-made in France to operate in the same rough conditions.

Number	Manufacturer	Series	Units	Power	Year of construction	Photo
BB01-12 (?)	Brissonneau et Lotz					BB05 im Lokfriedhof F´derik im Februar 2025
BB201–208	EMD	GPL-15T	8	1100 kW		
BB209–216	EMD	GPL-15T	8	1100 kW		
CC01–11	Alstom		11		1961–1962	
CC12–21	Alstom		10		1965	CC 20 im Lokfriedhof F´derik im Februar 2025
CC101–106	EMD	SDL40-2	6	2240 kW	1981	CC 102, 106 und 104 mit Erzzug bei der Kreuzung mit dem Le Train du desert im Bahnhof km 420 im Februar 2025
CC107–110	EMD	SDL40-2	4	2240 kW	1988	
CC111–116	EMD	SDL40-2	6	2240 kW	1993	
CC117–121	EMD	SDL40-2	5	2240 kW	1997	
CC122–127(?)	EMD	SD70ACS	6	2240 kW	2011(?)	

== Glencore ==
In 2014, mining giant Glencore acquired 18 years of access to SNIM's rail and port infrastructure for $1 billion, intending to link it to branch lines for new iron mines at Askaf and Guelb El Aouj. This arrangement aimed to save costs by avoiding the construction of separate tracks and facilities. Glencore withdrew from the project merely a year later, following a nearly 40% drop in the price of iron ore.

== See also ==
- Economy of Mauritania
- History of rail transport in Mauritania
- Transport in Mauritania
- Railway stations in Mauritania
- Enclave and exclave – crossborder shortcut to avoid tunnel.
