= Train des Mouettes =

Tourist train between Saujon and La Tremblade in France

Train des Mouetttes
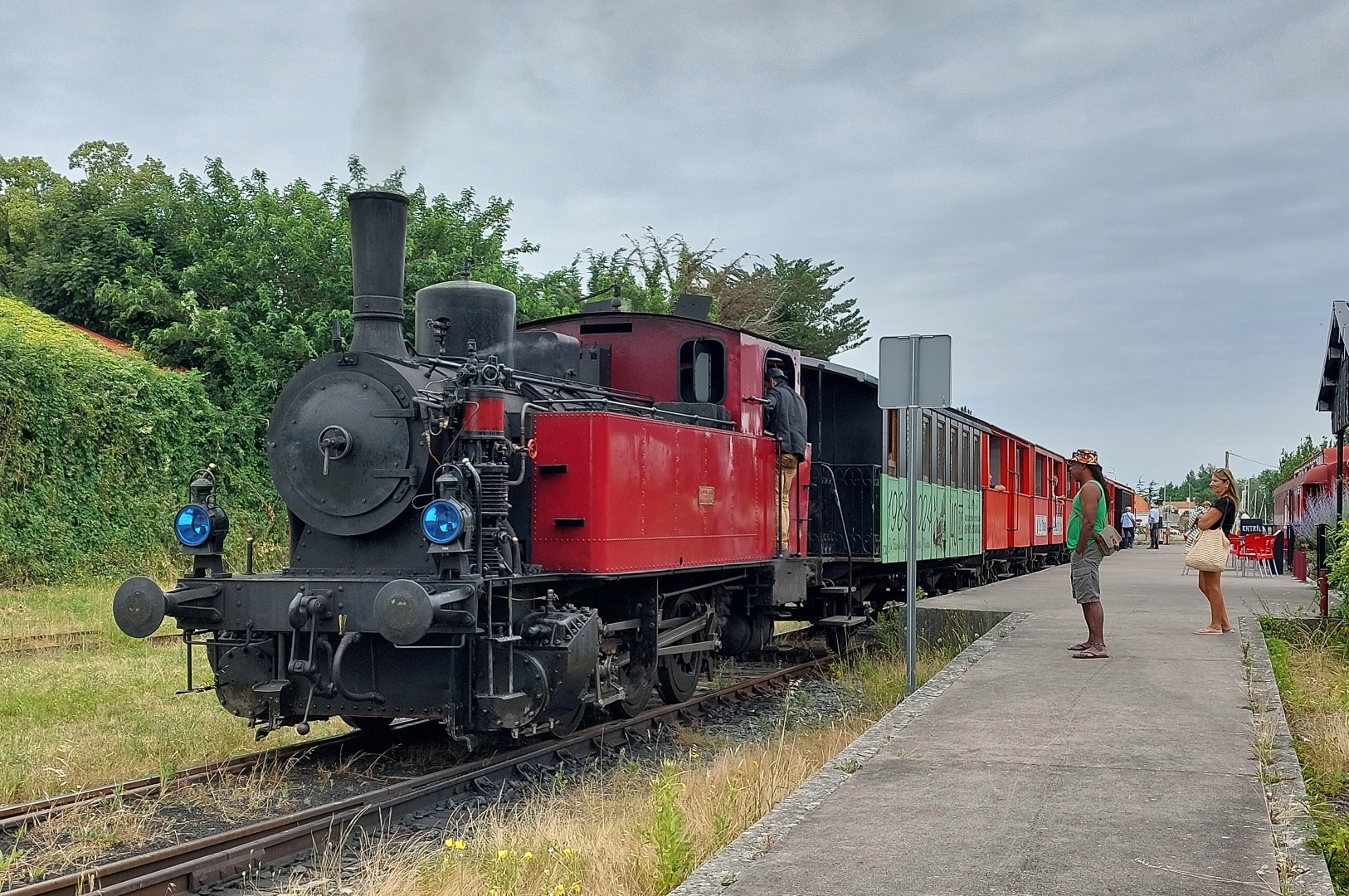
- A train at La Tremblade station

Service
- Type: Heritage railway

Technical
- Track gauge: 4 ft 8 1/2 in (1,435 mm) standard gauge

The Train des Mouettes (formerly the Seudre Tourist Railway) is a tourist train that has been operating since 1984 on the 21 km of railway between Saujon and La Tremblade on the Saujon to La Grève line in France. As the only steam railway in Charente Maritime (Nouvelle Aquitaine), it serves the stations of Fontbedeau, Mornac-sur-Seudre, Chaillevette, Étaules, and Arvert.

== History ==
=== Commercial Service ===
The 'Compagnie du chemin de fer de la Seudre' was founded on 25 April 1868 and required several years of negotiations before construction could commence. The line was opened to traffic on 8 April 1876 following completion of the section from La Tremblade to Saujon with an inaugural train running on 25 June 1876. It was later extended to the La Grève channel in La Tremblade.

In 1880, the line was acquired by the administration of the ‘Chemins de fer de l'État’, which also absorbed the bankrupt Compagnie des chemins de fer de l'Ouest in 1908. The state network, after merging with other national railway companies in 1938, became the SNCF.

In 1939, the line was closed to passenger traffic but continued its operations for freight transport.

In 1980, the SNCF closed the line to all traffic, with the exception of oyster trains operating from La Tremblade. Subsequently, the section between La Tremblade station and the La Grève terminus was dismantled.

=== Tourist Service ===
In 1984, the Seudre Tourist Railway (French: ‘Association du Chemin de Fer Touristique de la Seudre’, CFTS) revived the line by running a tourist train.

In 2002, CFTS ceased tourist operations. The infrastructure (track, stations and Chaillevette depot) was then acquired by the department of Charente-Maritime.

Between 2004 and 2006, the line's operation was entrusted to the company Veolia Transport through its subsidiary CFTA.

No trains ran in 2007.

In 2008, the ‘Trains & Traction’ association took over the operation of the line and secured its activity, reporting about 9800 passengers during the year.

Tourist operations take place from early May to late September, with daily runs in July and August. Some special trains are organised in-season or off-season, such as the "Train des Loupiotes" or the "Train Éclade de moules".

The office is located at Saujon Chemin Vert station, and the workshop is in Chaillevette, at the centre of the line.

In the summer of 2021, a train composed of restaurant cars hauled by a diesel locomotive, the Seudre Océan Express, entered service. The journey included a round trip between Saujon and Chaillevette, lasting about 3 hours, with a meal (lunch or dinner) prepared onboard from regional products and served at seats, without passengers disembarking during the journey.

The Seudre Océan Express ran regularly in 2022, especially during the holiday season, raising the total number of passengers carried in the year to 45000. The service was extended to 2023.

== Infrastructure ==
The 21km route has 69 level crossings.

The depot and workshop is located in Chaillevette, halfway along the line, and was expanded in 2015.

In 2020, two turntables were installed, one at each end of the line, allowing locomotives to be turned.

== Rolling Stock ==
The railway has about 60 items of rolling stock, of which 18 are classed as 'Historic Monuments':

=== Steam Locomotives ===
| Type | Builder | Year | Origin | Observations | Illustration |
|---|---|---|---|---|---|
| 030 T No.3 | Schneider n^{o} 2503 | 1891 | Chemin de fer de Saint-Victor-sur-Rhins à Cours | Named 'Progrès' Classified as a 'Historic Monument' in 1987. Arrived at Chaillevette in 1984 and in service since 2004. | |
| 030 T | Henschel n^{o} 11128 | 1912 | Usines Japy (Doubs) | Arrived at Chaillevette in 1984 and returned to steam 20 June 2015. | |
| 030 T No.5 | Fives-Lille n^{o} 3716 | 1910 | Mines de Ferfay | Classified as a 'Historic Monument' in 2004. On loan from 'Train à vapeur thouarsais'. Awaiting restoration. | |
| 030 T No.3 | Borsig type T 3 Prussienne | 1906 | Rosheim to Saint-Nabor line | Classified as a 'Historic Monument' in 1985. ex 'Train folklorique de Rosheim à Ottrott'. On loan from 'convention de l'Agence Départementale du Tourisme du Bas-Rhin'. Awaiting restoration. | |

=== Diesel Locomotives ===
| Type/Number | Builder | Year | Origin | Observations | Illustration |
|---|---|---|---|---|---|
| Y 2330 | Decauville | 1960 | SNCF Nantes-Blottereau | In service. | |
| Y 51228 | Blanc-Misseron | 1958 | Colas Rail Saint-Pierre-des-Corps. | Awaiting restoration. | |
| Y 51147 | SACM n^{o} 10019 | 1956 | SNCF Nevers, then 'Trains à vapeur de Touraine'. | In service. | |
| Y 7648 | Moyse | 1968 | SNCF Bordeaux | In service. | |
| BB 64073 | Brissonneau et Lotz | 1971 | SNCF Sotteville | In service. Painted in livery as 040 DE 073 | |
| BB 71008 | CFD | 1965 | SNCF Nevers, then CIPHA in Le Havre. | In service. Classified as a 'Historic Monument' in 2020. | |
| BB 71010 | CFD | 1965 | SNCF Nevers, then Rive-Bleue Express. | Awaiting restoration. | |
| Shunter (200hp) | Baudet Donon et Roussel Rebuilt on plans SACM in 1961 with a Baudouin motor. | 1961 | Société métallurgique de Normandie, then Silo Portuaire de Bollène. | In working order | |
| Shunter TE 4401 | Decauville | 1967 | Colas Rail Les Mureaux. | In working order | |
| CC 65005 | SACM, Alstom, CAFL | 1956 | SNCF Nantes-Blottereau until 1986, then Agrivap from 1987 to 2021. | Awaiting restoration at Saintes. | |

=== Battery Locomotive ===
| Type/Number | Builder | Year | Origin | Observations | Illustration |
|---|---|---|---|---|---|
| 13 t battery shunter No.320 | Orenstein & Koppel | 1913 | Foundry at Niederbronn-les-Bains | Awaiting restoration. | |

=== Railcars ===
| Type/Number | Builder | Year | Origin | Observations | Illustration |
|---|---|---|---|---|---|
| X 5822 | | | | Restoration on progress | |
| Type A75D 902 | Billard | 1947 | CFD Indre-et-Loire | Loaned by FACS | |
| X 2208 | | | Limoges depot. | On loan under an agreement with SNCF. On loan to Centre-Bretagne railway. | |
| X 2251 | | | Limoges depot. | On loan under an agreement with SNCF. On loan to Centre-Bretagne railway. | |

=== Draisines ===
| Type/Number | Builder | Year | Origin | Observations | Illustration |
|---|---|---|---|---|---|
| DU 50 4M 076 | | | | Out of service | |
| DU 49 catenary inspection car | | | Brive | Arrived Chaillevette 20 December 2023 Awaiting restoration | |

=== Passenger coaches ===
| Type/Number | Builder | Year | Origin | Observations | Illustration |
|---|---|---|---|---|---|
| 6 two-axle cars with open end platforms: C3 in yellow livery C12 in red livery, C32 in green livery C39 (chassis) C59 in original green livery C72 in original green livery | De Dietrich | | Built for the network of De Wendel mines then HBL of Petite-Rosselle | | Coach C3 Coach C12 Coach C32 Coach C72 |
| 2-axle closed car with open end platforms: C7 named "Badoise" | | 1907 | From the former Rabodeau tourist railway | | |
| Bogie postal car PAz Ocem type 1926, registered 50 87 00-37 304–8 | | | From the former tourist railway Autorail Touristique du Minervois | Refurbished and serving as the booking office at La Tremblade | Postal coach PAz Ocem |
| 2-axle postal car Patf Ocem known as "postal ambulant" | | | Alsace and Lorraine Railway | Loaned under Touraine Steam Trains agreement | |
| 8 covered 'Baladeuse' cars including one accessible to PRMs | | | Converted from old M-type vans by the CFTA workshops in 2003 | Ordered by the previous operator of the network, CONNEX Tradition | |
| Covered 'Baladeuse' accessible to PRMs | | | Converted from an old M-type van by the Chaillevette workshops in 2017 | | |
| Open car | SNAF-de Dietrich in Bône (Annaba) in Algeria | | Built on a tank wagon chassis | | |
| Covered 'Baladeuse' | Built on a Dyle and Bacalan chassis | 1892 | | Built in the "Saint-Germain train" style | |
| 3 axle Prussian car with side doors named "Armistice" C6tf | | 1908 | ex-State (classified MH) | | |
| 2 axle car with open end platforms No. 21 type B7 t 312 ("thunder box") | | | | Loaned under Touraine Steam Trains agreement | |
| 2 axle car with open end platforms No. 22 type B7 t 322 ("thunder box") | | | | Loaned under Touraine Steam Trains agreement | |
| 2 axle car with open end platforms No. 23 type B7 t 321 ("thunder box") | | | | Loaned under Touraine Steam Trains agreement | |
| 2 axle car with closed end platforms No. 24 type A6 t 134 ("thunder box") | | | | Loaned under Touraine Steam Trains agreement | |
| 3 axle car with side doors No. 25 type C7 tf 15062 | | 1901 | Alsace and Lorraine Railway | Classified as a 'Historic Monument' in 2006. Loaned under Touraine Steam Trains agreement | Coach type C7 tf 15062 |
| 3 axle car with side doors No.26 type B2C4 5231, ex BC3 Pr 11 | | 1912 | | Loaned under Touraine Steam Trains agreement | |
| First-class Corail Lunéa A9 car | | | | loaned under SNCF agreement. Installed in a fixed position, used to accommodate volunteers in season | |
| 4 Swiss unified type I air-conditioned cars | | | Voralpen-Express | To create a restaurant train | |
| A7 yfi 5 West bogie car | | 1907 | previously at AJECTA | Currently being restored in Rochefort. Classified as a Historic Monument in 1991 | Coach A7 yfi 5 West |

=== Wagons ===
- One 1889 three-axle PLM van;
- One 1898 'Chemins de fer de l'Est two-axle van;
- One 1905 two-axle West State Railways van, rebuilt and returned to service in 2015. Classified as a Historic Monument in 1994;
- Seven 1866-1869 two-axle type M vans for freight trains, including number 40 87 949 which was classified as a Historic Monument in 2013;
- One two axle postal van with open end platforms, built by Van der Zypen & Charlier in 1902 for the line from Rosheim to Saint-Nabor, from the former tourist railway "Train folklorique de Rosheim a Ottrott".
- One MC 76 Corail van, loaned under SNCF agreement. Installed in a fixed position serving as a changing room for volunteers in season.
- One two-axle metallised baggage van ex-Midi Dd2 50 87 93-37 536–3, modified into a generator van to accompany the restaurant train. Loaned under SNCF agreement.
- One two-axle tank car built in Germany in 1928 for France for war damages;
- One OCEM 19 flat wagon with drop sides;
- One rake of Talbot ballast hoppers type SV-WF 969 495 built in Germany in 1930 for France for war damages, classified as a Historic Monument in 1990;
- Ten American bogie wagons type USA 1918 called "TP": 3 flats, 2 tanks, 4 covers, 1 dumper, including the 4-door covered type Lyw 422 874, classified as a Historic Monument in 1990 and the 2-door covered Lyw 412 000 called "Felton", classified as a Historic Monument in 2006;
- One original 'Compagnie du chemin de fer de Paris à Orléans' covered wagon with double pitched roof, from the Touraine Steam Trains;
- Three Ouest-Etat type covered wagons from the Touraine Steam Trains;
- One flat wagon number Jho 117544 of 'Compagnie de l'Est' origin, from the Touraine Steam Trains;

=== 'US 1917' Wagons ===
In September 2016 in Chaillevette, the restoration of a train of six wagons known as type "US 1917" began. This work, which received the support of the Heritage Foundation and the United States World War I Centennial Commission, involved two covered wagons, a flat wagon with stanchions, a gondola, a tank and a low sided wagon. At the end of October 2017, the first two left the Train des Mouettes workshops. This rolling stock was restored to the original livery of the American Expeditionary Force of the First World War. The two wagons were exhibited in La Rochelle from 9 to 19 November 2017, as part of the centenary of the arrival of American soldiers during the First World War. It was in La Rochelle that parts for 37,800 wagons were unloaded, to be assembled by American soldiers, then, once peace returned, by the Middletown Car Company based in Aytré, Charente-Maritime, France.
