= Choum =

Choum شوم
- Commune and town
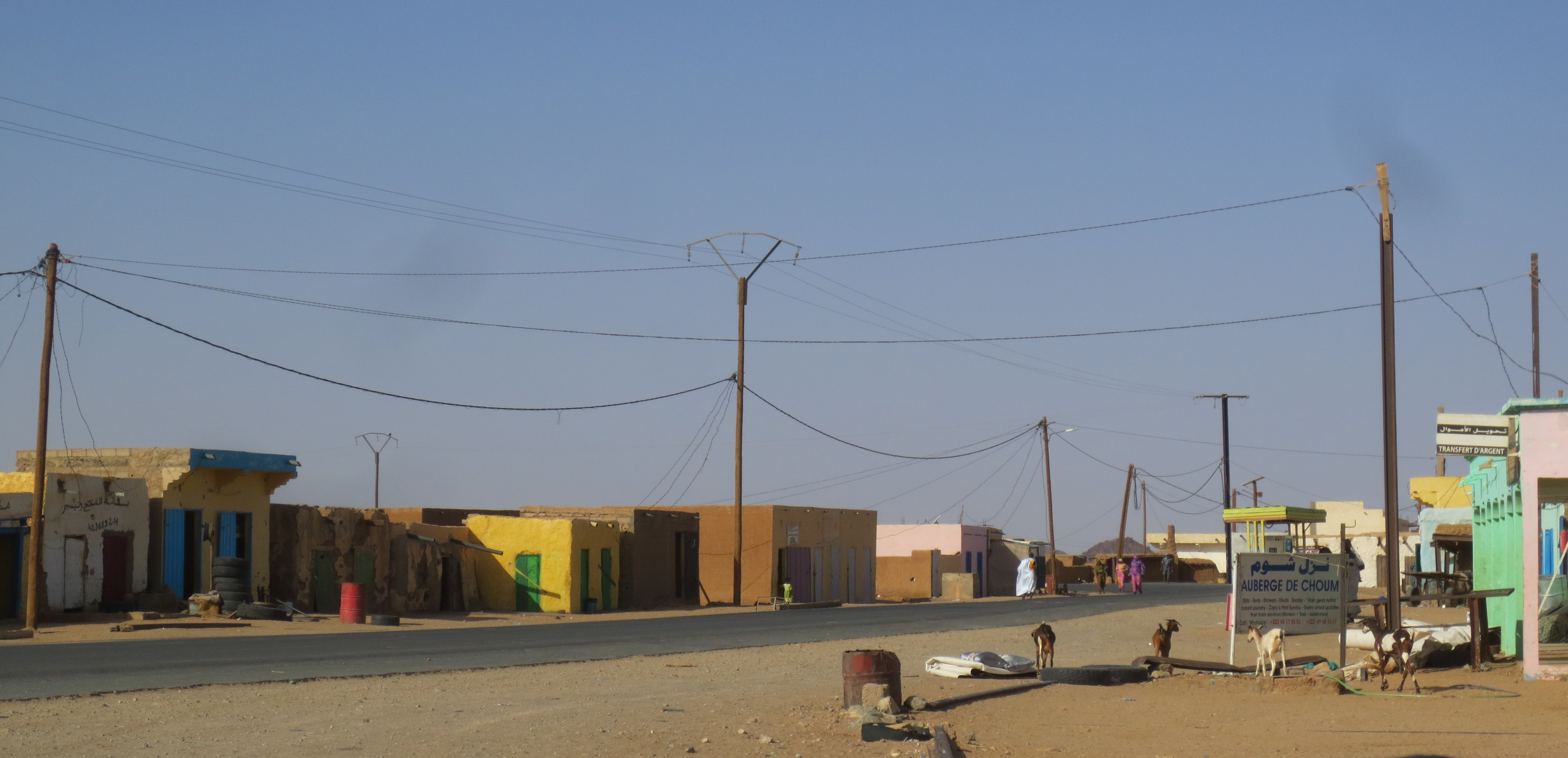

- Location in Mauritania
- Coordinates: 21°18′N 13°04′W
- Country: Mauritania
- Region: Adrar Region
- Department: Atar Department
- Elevation: 328.0 m (1,076.1 ft)

Population (2000)
  - Total: 2,735
- Time zone: UTC (UTC±00:00)

Choum (Arabic: شوم) is a town in northern Mauritania, lying in the Adrar Region close to the border with Western Sahara.

In the year 2000, Choum had a population of 2,735.

== History ==
The town grew from its position on trans-Saharan trading routes. It declined with the trade, and, in 1977, was attacked by French troops as a suspected base of the Polisario Front, the rebel organization fighting for independence for the Western Sahara. Fortifications from the period survive around the town.

== Transport ==
Choum is a stop on the Mauritania Railway from Nouadhibou on the Atlantic coast to Zouérat, and a transport interchange for access to the Adrar Plateau and the Mauritanian capital Nouakchott.

=== Railway tunnel ===
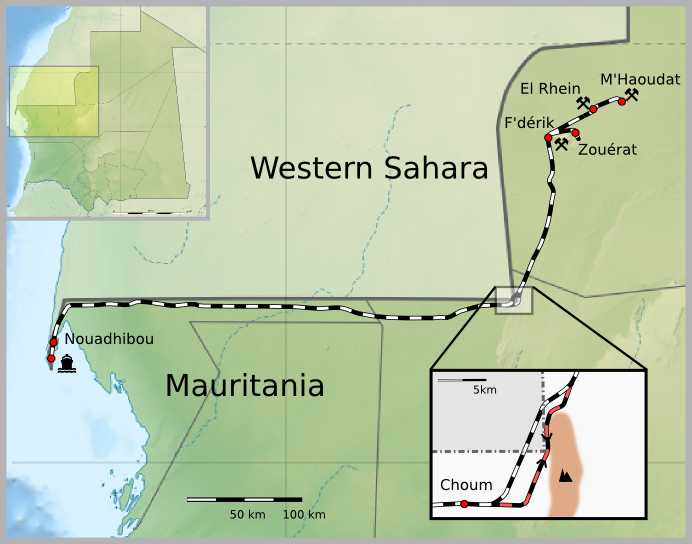
Mauritania Railway route.

The town stands on a spur of land which carries the major turning-point in the border between Mauritania and the Western Sahara.

In the early 1960s, the French colonial authorities in Mauritania wished to build the line from Nouadhibou to Zouérat to exploit the iron ore reserves at Zouérat. The Spanish authorities then responsible for the Western Sahara negotiated to allow the railway to be built through Spanish territory over relatively level desert, but imposed many conditions unacceptable to the French.

The French engineers therefore designed the line parallel to the border and a tunnel through the Choum hill spur — 2 km through solid granite just to stay within French territory.

The tunnel is no longer in use and a 5 km section of the railway cuts right through the Polisario-controlled part of the Western Sahara (21.354867°N 13.012644°W).

The N1 highway from Atar now runs all the way to north Zouérat. The sandy track paralleling the railway west to Nouadhibou traverses low dune cordons. Regular vehicles can be loaded onto a flatbed wagon at Choum.

== Tourism: The Desert Train ==
The town of Choum is an important stop on the Mauritanian railway. Often nicknamed the "desert train," it is one of the country's major logistical arteries.

In Choum, trains stop to transport passengers, goods, and sometimes vehicles. Although primarily used for transporting iron ore, this train is also used by local travelers and tourists, who often board the freight cars.

Due to its length—which can exceed two kilometers—and its rudimentary transport conditions, the desert train is a popular destination.

== See also ==
- Railway stations in Mauritania
- Enclave and exclave § National railway passing through another state's territory
- Transport in Mauritania
- Tiris al-Gharbiyya
