= Lebtheinia mine =

Iron ore mine in Adrar Region, Mauritania

- Location: Adrar Region, Mauritania
- Products: Iron ore

The Lebtheinia mine is a large iron mine located in central Mauritania in the Adrar Region. Lebtheinia represents one of the largest iron ore reserves in Mauritania and in the world having estimated reserves of 2.74 billion tonnes of ore grading 48% iron metal.
