= SNCF Class CC 7100 =

Series of French electric locomotives

Class CC 7100
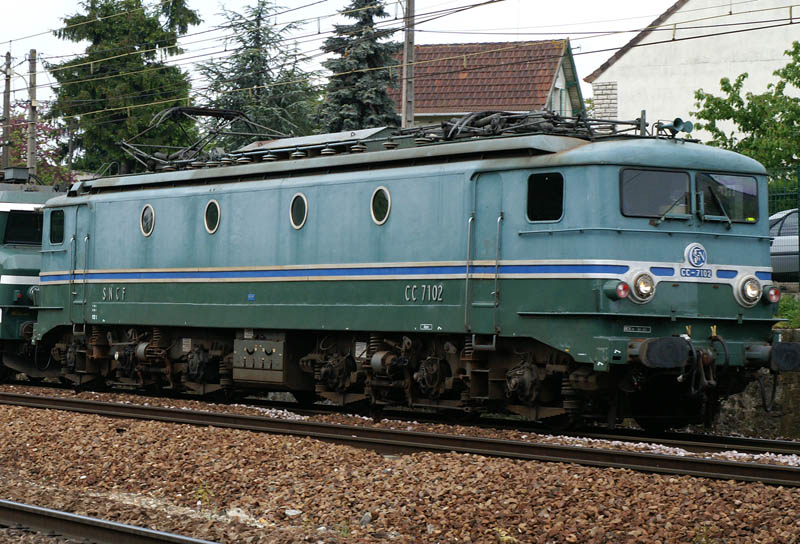
- SNCF CC 7102 at Le Mee sur Seine
Type and origin
- Power type: Electric
- Builder: Alstom
- Build date: 1952–1955
- Total produced: 58
Specifications
- Configuration
  - UIC: Co′Co′
- Gauge: 1,435 mm (4 ft 8 1/2 in)
- Driver dia.: 1,250 mm (49.21 in)
- Length: 18.922 m (62 ft 1 in)
- Width: 2.968 m (9 ft 9 in)
- Height: 4.218 m (13 ft 10 in)
- Loco weight: 107 t (105 long tons; 118 short tons)
- Electric system/s: 1.5 kV DC Catenary
- Current pickup(s): Pantograph
- Transmission: Electric
Performance figures
- Maximum speed: 140 km/h (87 mph)
- Power output: 3,490 kW (4,680 hp)
- Tractive effort: 260 kN (58,000 lbf)
Career
- Operators: SNCF
- Class: CC 7100
- Retired: 1985–2001
- Disposition: 5 preserved

SNCF's CC 7100 class are part of a series of electric locomotives built by Alstom. The prototype 'CC 7000' (7001 & 7002) were built in 1949 and the production series locomotives CC 7101-CC 7158 followed during 1952–1955. Two of the class are notable for setting world rail speed records: CC 7121 reaching 243 kilometres per hour (151 mph) on 21 February 1954, and CC 7107 reaching 331 kilometres per hour (206 mph) on 28/29 March 1955.

== History ==
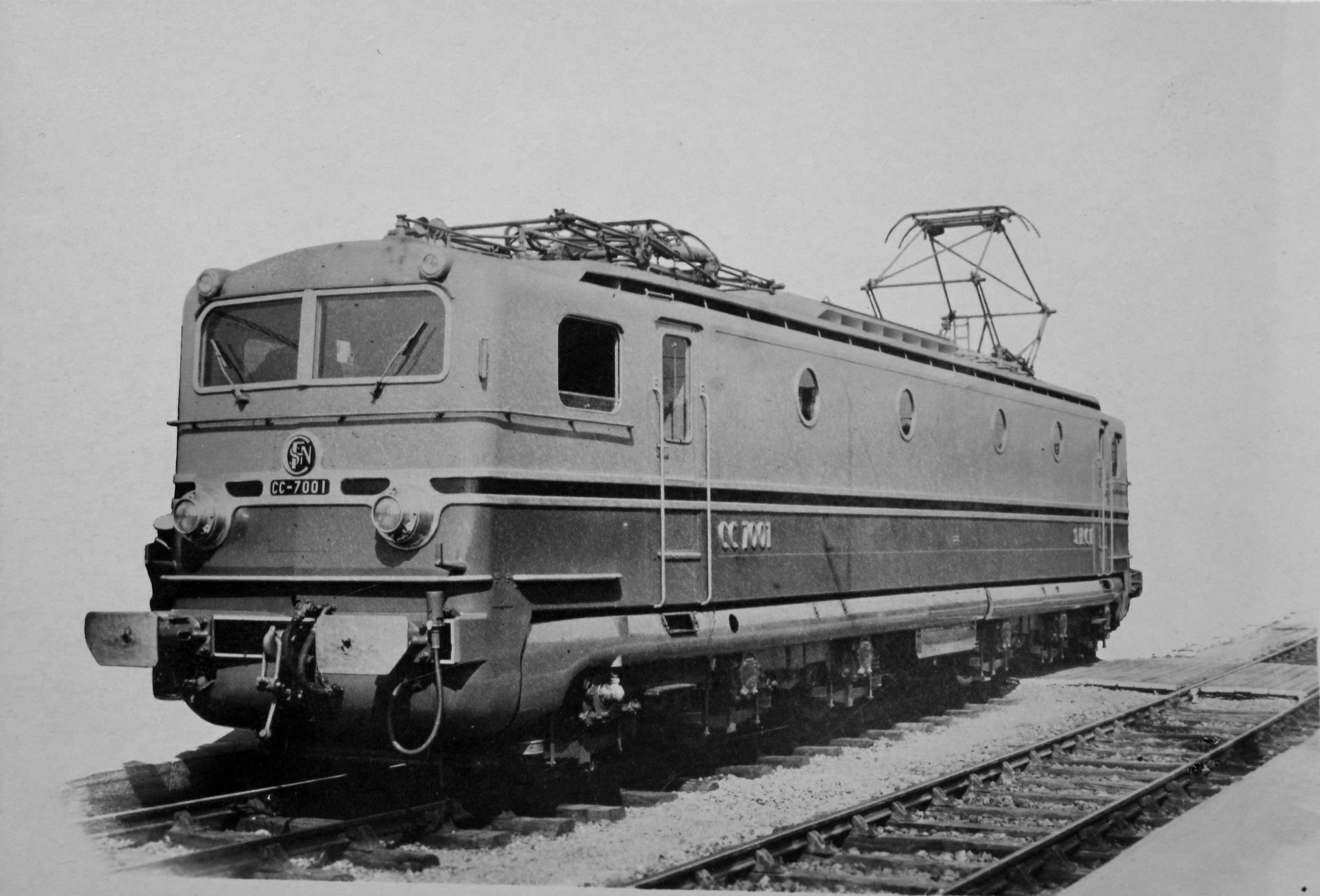
Prototype, as delivered, with the original valances and windscreen

The CC 7100 class were the first SNCF high-speed locomotives in which all the axles were motorized, i.e. with powered bogies rather a rigid frame. As delivered their top speed was 150 kilometres per hour (93.2 mph).

The CC 7100 were contemporaries of the 2D2 9100 for express passenger service on the PLM. From the outset it was apparent that bogie locomotives represented the future and so only a third of the anticipated 2D2s were built, in favour of the CC 7100.

=== Speed records ===
During the 1950s, SNCF's experimental investigations into high-speed rail saw some CC 7100 class locomotives specially-modified for operation at speeds far higher than their regular service speed. These experiments provided valuable test data for the SNCF to develop increasingly more rapid regular services, including the 200 kilometres per hour (124 mph) Mistral of 1967, and ultimately the TGV.

CC 7121 broke the rail speed record when it achieved 243 kilometres per hour (151 mph) on the PLM mainline between Dijon and Beaune on 21 February 1954.

Preparations for further high-speed tests proceeded, and in March 1955 CC 7107 and Bo-Bo locomotive BB 9004 both attained 331 kilometres per hour (206 mph) on separate high-speed runs between Bordeaux and Dax, Landes. CC 7107 hauled a three car train with streamlining modifications to reduce aerodynamic drag.

Although the rail speed record has since 1990 been repeatedly broken by high-speed trainsets such as the French TGV and the German InterCityExperimental trains, BB 9004 and CC 7107 retained the locomotive speed record for over 50 years until it was broken on 2 September 2006 by a Siemens Taurus locomotive, ÖBB No 1216 050, which attained 357 kilometres per hour (222 mph) hauling a single dynamometer car on the Nuremberg–Ingolstadt high-speed railway in Germany.

=== Later years ===
The locos were all given a "GRG" (major refurbishment) in the early 1980s to remove the original "skirts", and to replace the original windscreens and head/tail lamps clusters with "standard SNCF" arrangement. They replaced the 2D2 9100 in their last passenger service.

Certain class members were fitted with third rail pick up shoes to work Chambéry-Modane services. The shoes were removed in 1976.

Despite their high-speed credentials, the CC 7100 class was relegated to freight haulage duties as more modern electric locomotives, commencing with the BB 9200 class, replaced them on passenger services.

=== Withdrawal and preservation ===
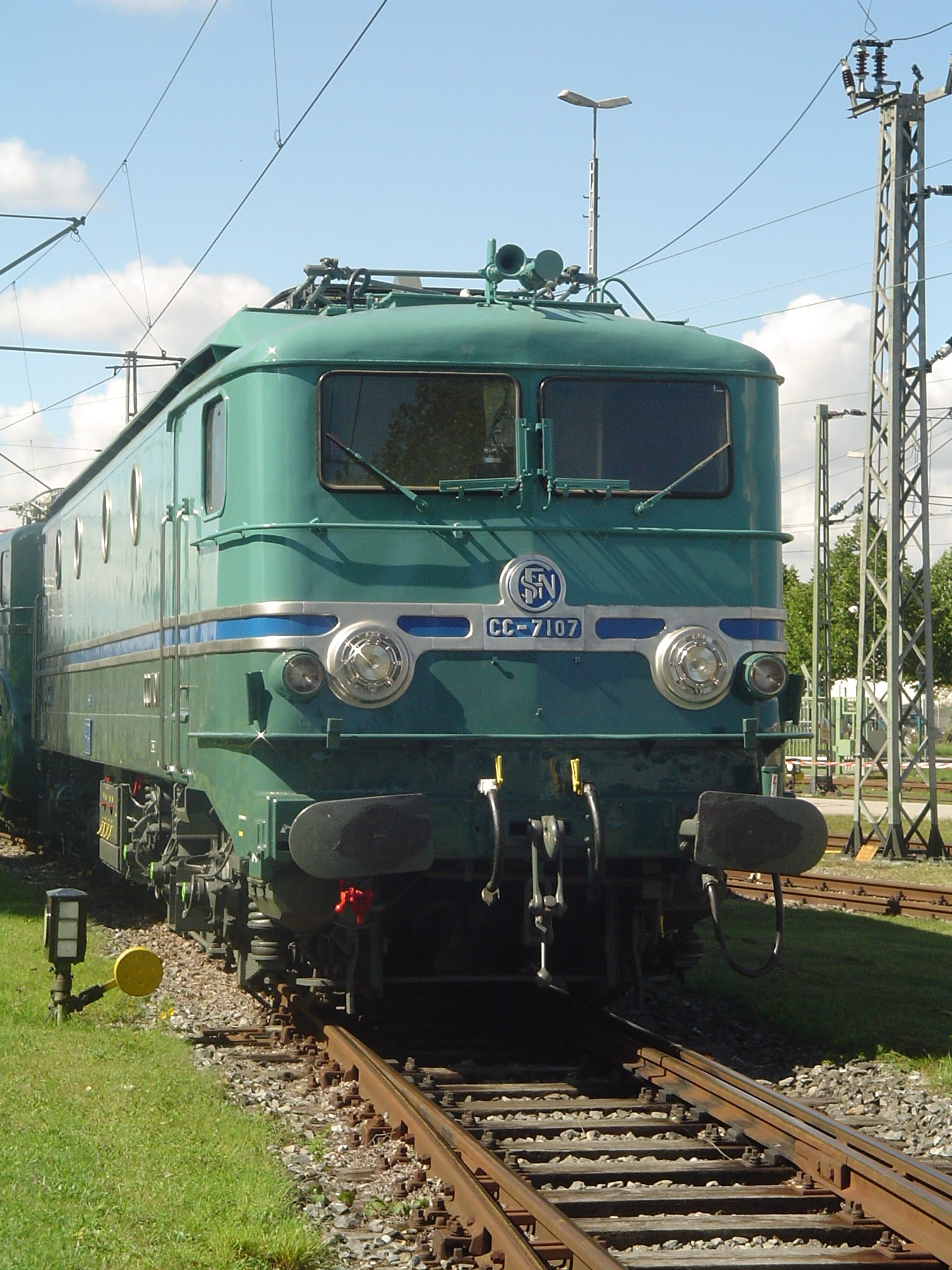
CC 7107 in Germany, 4 September 2006

By 2001, the class was reduced to just five operating examples. The introduction of the BB 27000 class dual voltage freight locomotives led to the final withdrawal of these last locomotives from regular service.

Together with fellow record holder BB 9004, CC 7107 was towed to Germany in 2006 to be present for No 1216 050's record breaking run.

== Preserved locomotives ==
- CC 7002: Ambérieu
- CC 7102: Chambéry
- CC 7106: Ambérieu
- CC 7107: Mulhouse at the Cité du train museum
- CC 7121: Nîmes
- CC 7140: Breil-sur-Roya
