= Chemins de fer de Paris à Orléans et du Midi =

French railway company

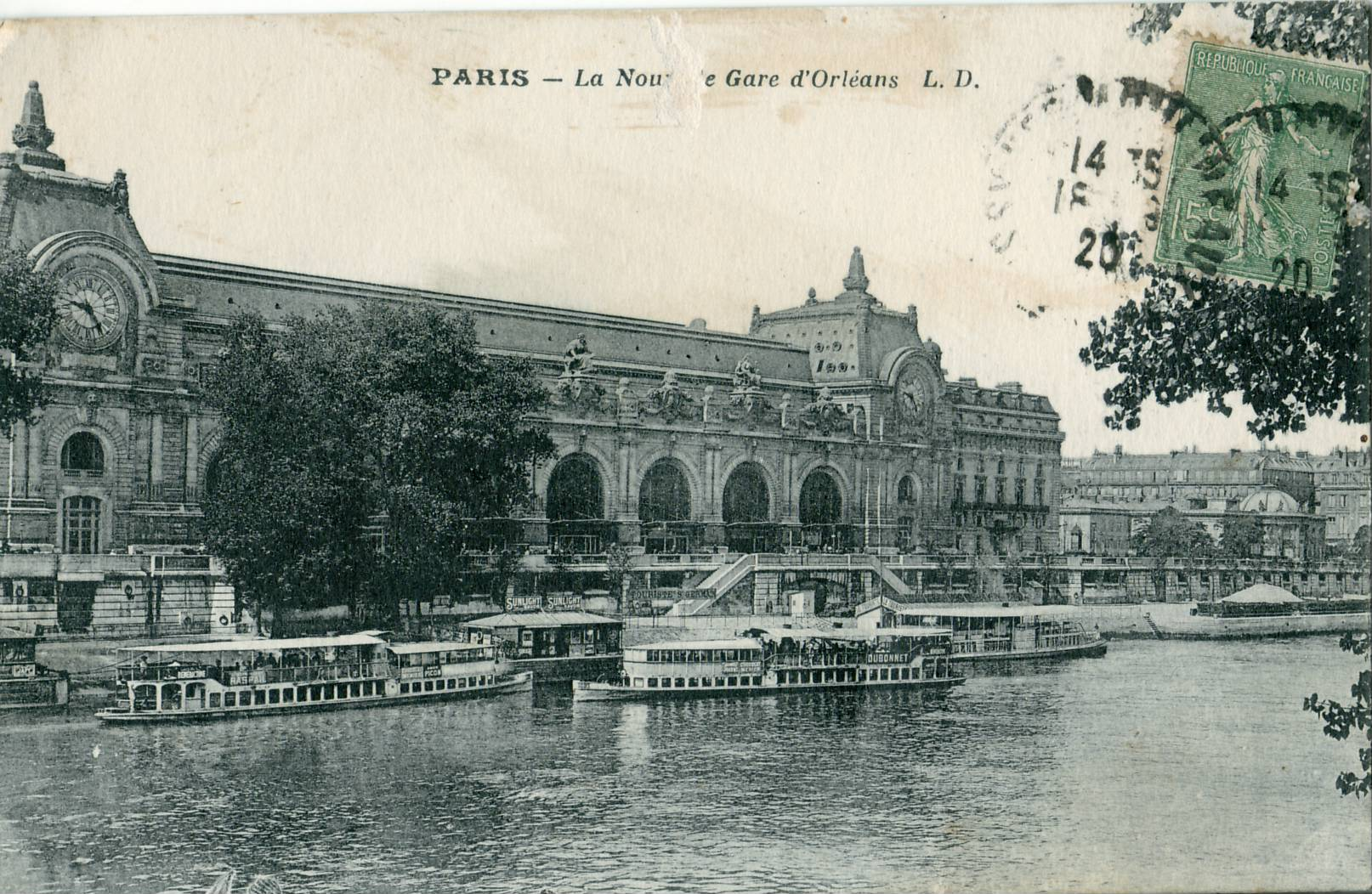
The Paris-Orsay station, one of the main stations of the PO-Midi company

The Compagnie du chemin de fer de Paris à Orléans et du Midi (French pronunciation: [kɔ̃paɲi dy ʃəmɛ̃ də fɛʁ də paʁi a ɔʁleɑ̃ e dy midi]), often abbreviated to PO-Midi, was an early French railway company that was formed in 1934 following the merger of the Chemin de fer de Paris à Orléans and the Chemins de fer du Midi.

In 1937, it was nationalised to become part of the Société Nationale des Chemins de fer Français (SNCF).
