= SNCF BB 1-80 =

PO E.1 to E.80 SNCF BB 1 to BB 80
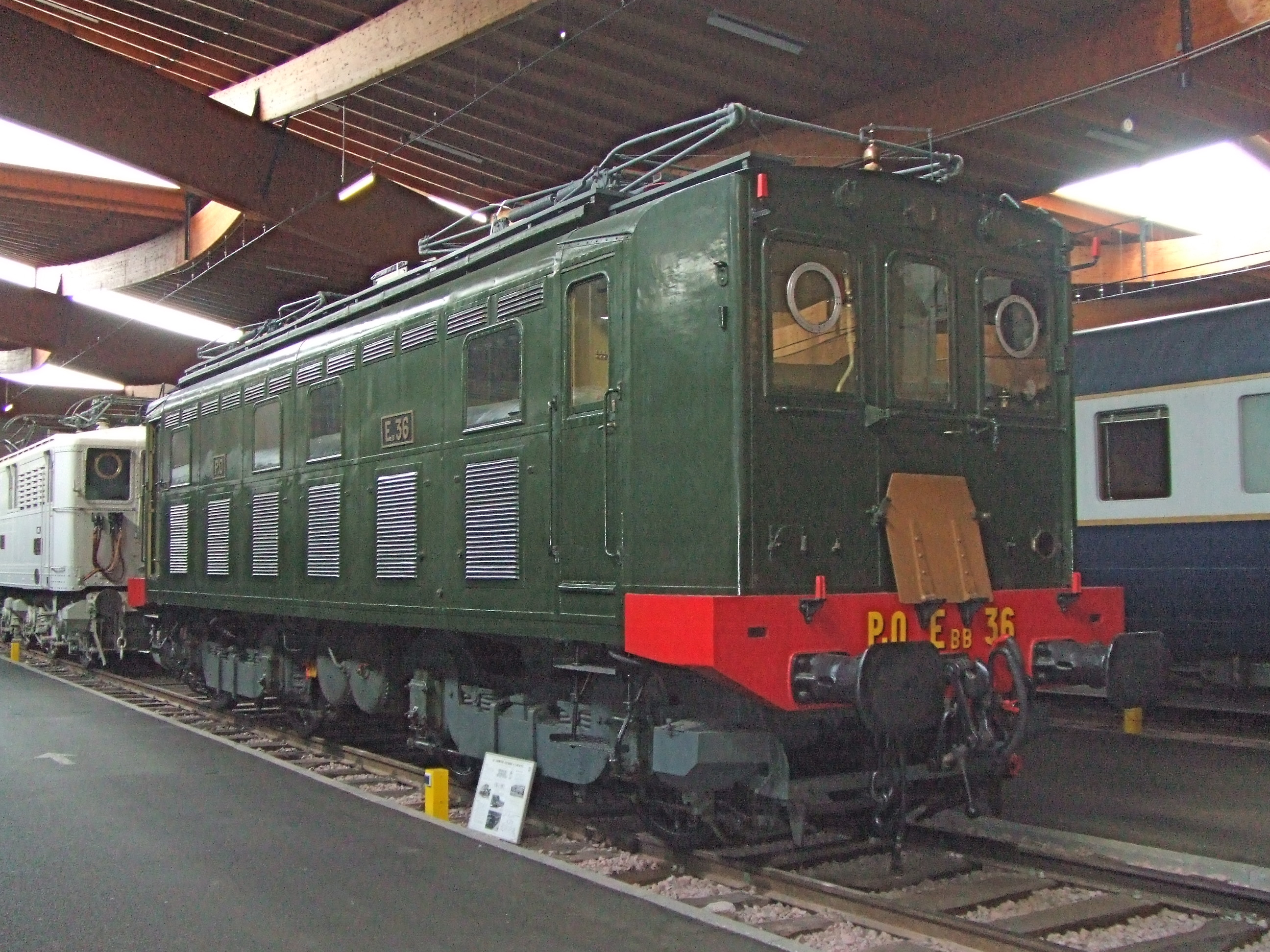
- E-BB 36 preserved in Cité du Train, Mulhouse
Type and origin
- Power type: Electric
- Builder: SEECF
- Serial number: Schneider 5011–5090
- Build date: 1924–1928
- Total produced: 80
Specifications
- Configuration
  - Commonwealth: Bo-Bo
- Gauge: 1,435 mm (4 ft 8 1/2 in) standard gauge
- Wheel diameter: 1,250 mm (49 1/4 in)
- Length: 12.690 m (41 ft 7 1/2 in)
- Loco weight: 72 tonnes (71 long tons; 79 short tons)
- Power supply: 1500 V DC
- Electric system/s: Catenary/3rd rail
- Current pickup: Pantograph/Contact shoe
- Traction motors: 4 x GE276
- MU working: Yes
Performance figures
- Maximum speed: 90 km/h (56 mph)
- Power output
  - 1 hour: 1,236 kW (1,658 hp)
  - Continuous: 972 kW (1,303 hp)
Career
- Operators: PO; SNCF
- Numbers: PO/PO-Midi: E-BB 1 to E-BB 80; SNCF: BB 1 to BB 80
- Nicknames: Biquettes
- Retired: 1944 (7), 1969–1980
- Preserved: E.36
- Disposition: One preserved, remainder scrapped

The BB 1 to 80 are electric locomotives of the former Paris-Orléans company first built in 1924, taken over by the SNCF at its creation in 1938.

This class was one of a group of four, altogether totalling 200 locomotives for mixed traffic use, ordered by the Orléans network during the electrification of the Paris - Vierzon line; they were put into service between 1924 and 1928. Later, some of these locomotives operated various services at the head of passenger trains, in push-pull mode, in the south-eastern suburbs of Paris. They were also used for freight trains, which were better suited to their technical characteristics. In the 1960s and 1970s, around twenty of them were modified to run as permanently coupled double units on the Maurienne line, then electrified on the third rail. The class was withdrawn between 1969 and 1980, except for seven locomotives destroyed in 1944 by Allied bombardments of the depots where they were stabled.

== Design and construction ==
Between 1900 and 1917, French railway companies carried out line electrification on their networks, either by third rail or by catenary, with various types of current (direct, single-phase alternating, at various voltages and/or frequencies). On 29 August 1920, a ministerial decision standardised on 1.5 kV DC for all new lines. Those already electrified had to adopt the new standard.

It was within this framework that the PO company undertook, in 1920, the electrification of the Paris-Vierzon line, completed in 1926. To operate the line it placed an order for 200 locomotives, capable of hauling both passenger and goods trains, divided into four classes. Among them were the 80 locomotives, then numbered E-BB 1 to E-BB 80.

The locomotives were built by SEECF, the research company for railway electrification. This company, created in 1920, brought together French manufacturers, such as Schneider and Jeumont, and American companies, such as Thomson-Houston, which held General Electric patents.

Simplified diagram of BB 37 in its SNCF configuration

Mechanically, the E-BB 1-80 were developed from Etat Z 6001-6030 locomotives. Their electrical equipment was directly adapted from American technology. The locomotives were 12.690 m (41 ft 7.6 in) long and consisted of a single body attached to the frame. The chassis consists of two BB type bogies, each with two General Electric GE 276 traction motors. The suspension used leaf and helix springs. The electro-pneumatic equipment was supplied by Westinghouse. Current collection was principally by pantograph, though a number of locomotives were also equipped with contact shoes for operation on third rail. The weight in running order of the locomotive was 72 t (71 long tons; 79 short tons); the continuous power rating was 972 kW (1,303 hp), with a one-hour rating of 1,236 kW (1,658 hp). The whole class was equipped to operate in multiple; for this purpose, in addition to the connection and cabling equipment, cab end doors allowed passage from one locomotive to another while running. In the body, the electrical equipment, protected by wire mesh panels, was placed on either side of the central corridor which connected the two driving cabins.

== Operational history ==
The first four machines were delivered in 1924, the last in 1928.

=== Towards Brive and Bordeaux ===
When the first 21 locomotives were delivered, the electrification of the Paris-Vierzon line hadn't been completed so, as an interim measure, they were temporarily fitted with contact shoes to operate the third rail suburban services between Gare d'Orsay and Juvisy. It was not until 22 December 1926 that the Paris-Vierzon line was fully electrified by catenary. The E-BB 1-80 were then put to intensive use, the first locomotives delivered gradually losing their contact shoe equipment. They had a tendency to rear up at start-up, which earned them their nickname "biquettes" ((French lit. 'young female goats or "kids"')). However, their maximum speed of 90 km/h (56 mph), (attempts to raise their speed limit to 105 km/h (65 mph) did not succeed) and their lack of power proved a handicap to them when rostered on passenger trains, for lack of a sufficient fleet of dedicated passenger locomotives; they were more efficient in hauling freight trains. Initially they suffered from a number of teething problems, the traction motors being insufficiently reliable and the Westinghouse equipment prone to numerous breakdowns; they were the subject of numerous modifications aimed at solving these problems. As the electrification programme continued, however, they reached Tours in 1933 and Brive-la Gaillarde in 1935.

When the SNCF was created in 1938, the locomotives, renumbered BB 1-80, were allocated to nine different depots. In addition to their previous routes, they now operated services to Bordeaux. During the Second World War, in October 1943, they were re-allocated to the depots of Orleans, Tours-Saint-Pierre and Vierzon but the Allied bombardments in 1944 destroyed seven members of the class., two at Orleans, four at Tours-Saint-Pierre and one at Vierzon. Other's of the class were damaged, but were gradually repaired after the end of the conflict.

=== On the south-eastern suburbs of Paris ===
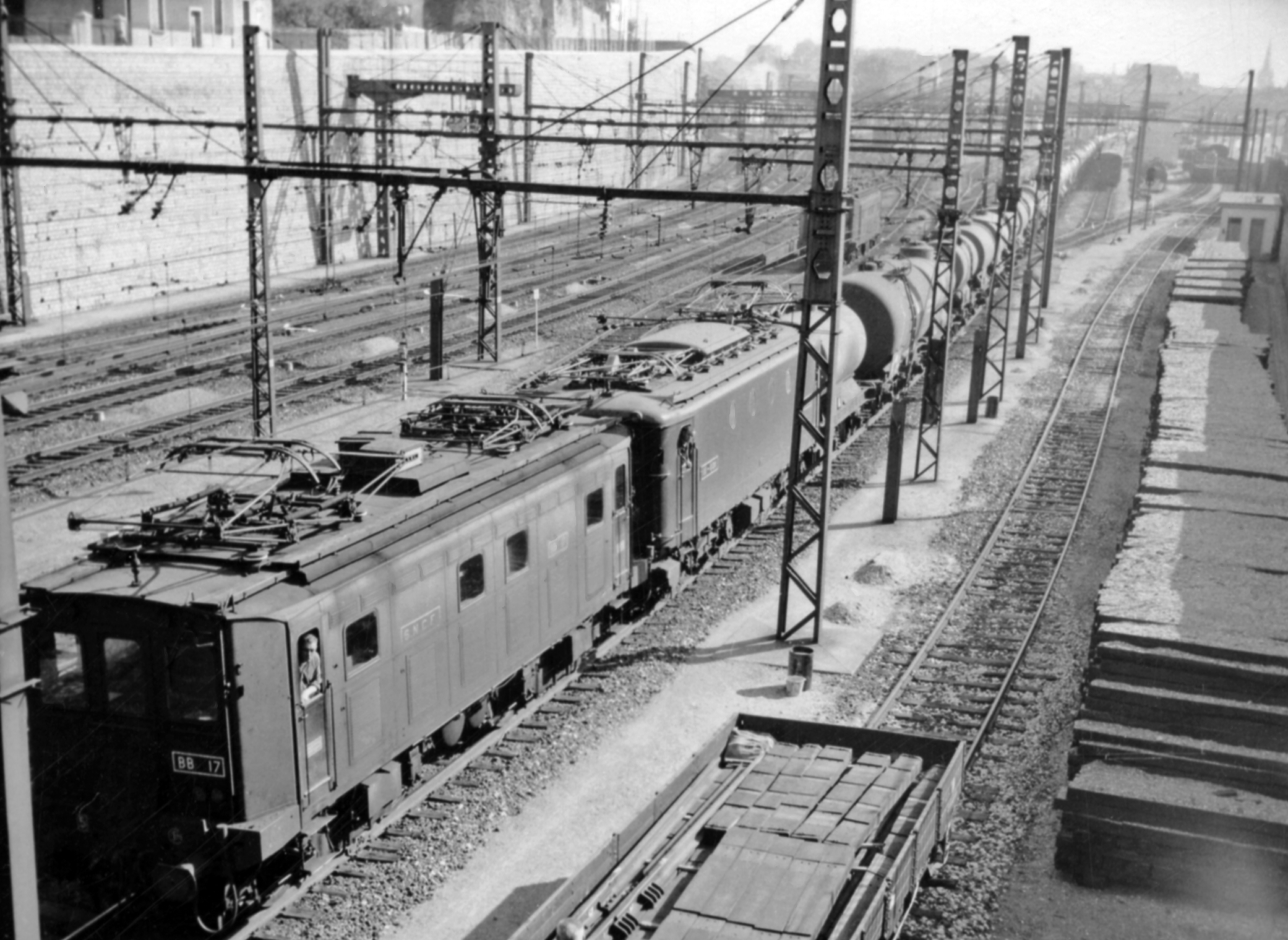
BB 17 at the head of a train of wine tank wagons

By the end of World War II, the class was reduced to 73 locomotives. In 1950, some of them were allocated to the operation of push–pull trains in the south-eastern suburbs of Paris, departing from Gare de Lyon. To facilitate this, the control gear from the rear driver's cab was removed and installed in the pilot car at the other end of the train. Eighteen locomotives were thus modified and assigned to the Paris-Lyon depot. Five years later, the delivery of new class Z 5100 electric multiple units to Paris-Lyon displaced the push-pull equipped locomotives which were sent to Lyon. In the southwest, the class operated almost exclusively at the head of freight trains to Vierzon or Tours.

=== On the Maurienne line ===
From the end of the 1950s, the signing of the Treaty of Rome resulted in a sharp increase in Franco-Italian traffic on the Maurienne line. Reinforcements in third rail motive power were then necessary on this route. In the absence of other locomotives immediately available, recourse was made to BB 1-80 from the Lyon-Mouche depot which were made available by the arrival of more modern and more powerful BB 9400 locomotives. The BB 1-80s were adapted to run in permanently coupled pairs equipped with contact shoes at the outer ends. This arrangement allows the unit to be sufficiently long (25.380 m (83 ft 3.2 in)) to cross the gaps in the third rail at switches and crossings without interrupting the electrical supply. This resulted in a locomotive with a power output of nearly 2,000 kW (2,700 hp).

The modifications were carried out on the locomotives at the workshops of Oullins and at the depot of Dole. In addition to fitting contact shoes at both ends of the assembly, the work included fitting electronic control equipment and regenerative braking, the removal of the two end pantographs and the shutdown of the cabs facing each other. Between 1961 and 1968, eleven “Maurienne units” were thus set up and assigned to Chambéry depot. Maurienne units operated alone or coupled in pairs or threes; making them very versatile. In 1976, the replacement of the third rail by overhead catenary on this line allowed all the direct current locomotives to operate there. The aging Maurienne units were withdrawn in 1979, their services being taken over by the more powerful BB 8100 locomotives recently transferred to Chambéry.

=== Withdrawal ===
In later years BB 1-80s, excluding the Maurienne units, operated in the large south-eastern suburbs of Paris or were assigned to trip working between stations; a few freight trains were still allocated to them. Push-pull fitted locomotives still worked from Paris-Lyon to Laroche - Migennes. The locomotives based in Villeneuve-Saint-Georges provided worker shuttles before being transferred to Lyon between 1970 and 1976.

With the exception of the seven locomotives destroyed in 1944, the first withdrawals took place in 1969, the last in 1980. Unmodified locomotives, those which were not push-pull fitted or Maurienne units, were the first to disappear by 1976. Among them, BB 17, withdrawn from revenue service in 1971, served as a mobile laboratory for chopper equipment.

== Preservation ==
BB 36, withdrawn in 1973 from the Lyon-Mouche depot, was restored in the early 1980s, by the Brive workshops, to its original PO condition and numbered E-BB 36. It is now exhibited at the Cité du train in Mulhouse.
