= Compagnie du chemin de fer de Paris à Orléans =

French railway company

- Industry: rail transport
- Founded: 1838
- Fate: Merged then nationalised
- Successor: Chemins de fer de Paris à Orléans et du Midi (1934); SNCF (1938)

The Compagnie du chemin de fer de Paris à Orléans (French pronunciation: [kɔ̃paɲi dy ʃəmɛ̃ də fɛʁ də paʁi a ɔʁleɑ̃], PO) was an early French railway company.

It merged with the Chemins de fer du Midi to form Chemins de fer de Paris à Orléans et du Midi (PO-Midi) in 1934. In 1938 the PO-Midi was nationalized with five other companies to become a part of SNCF.

== History ==
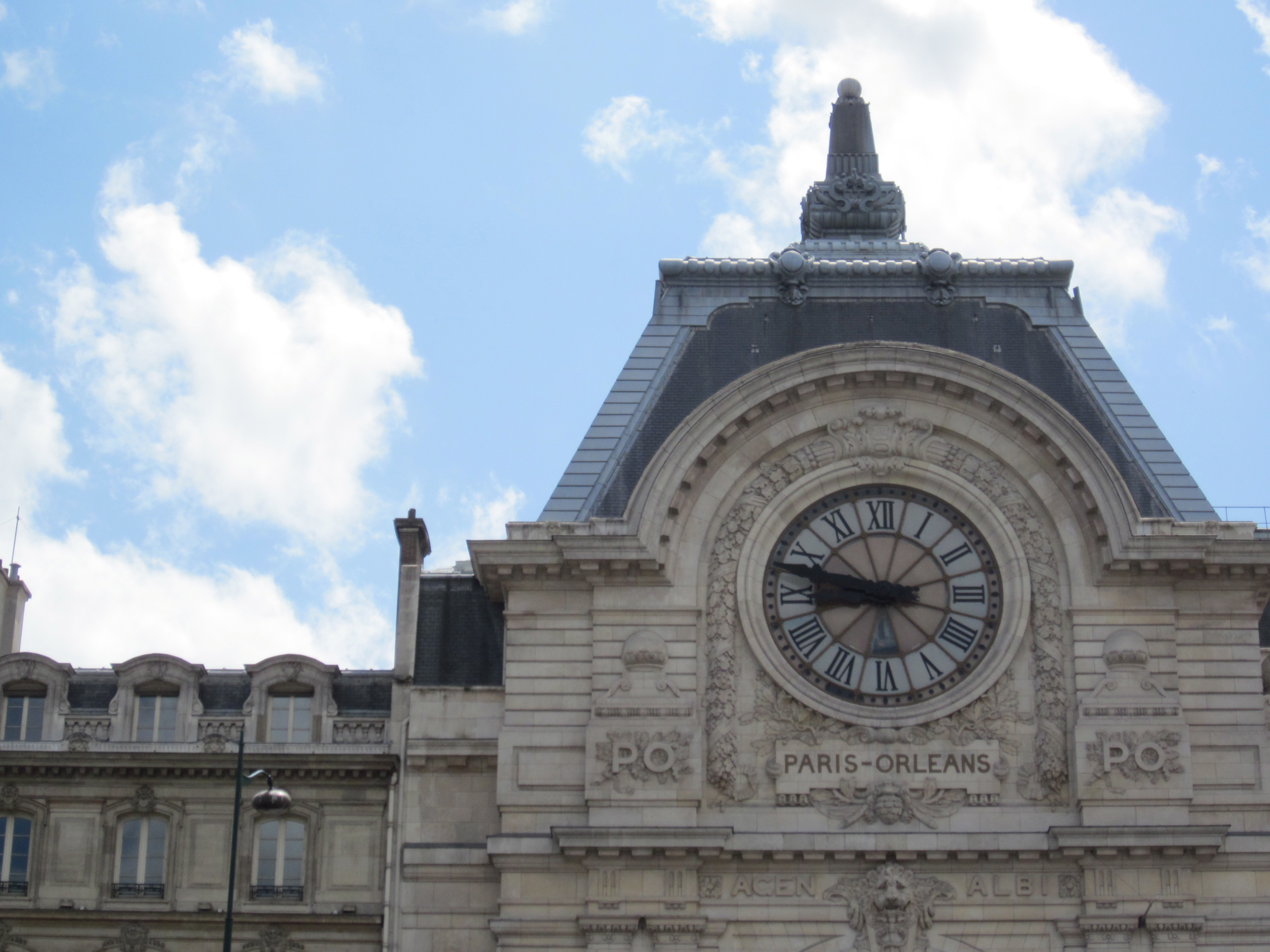
Frontage of the Musée d'Orsay, whose building was originally the PO's Gare d'Orsay

=== Beginnings as railway company ===
The company was founded on 13 August 1838 under the name Compagnie du chemin de fer de Paris à Orléans (PO). It had the right to form a limited company and was equipped with a starting capital of 40 million francs. In addition, the company had one of the French government's awarded temporary concession of 70 years, to build and operate a railway between the cities of Paris and Orléans. It had its headquarters in Paris. The first president of the board was François Bartholony.

The first operation of the line dated 20 September 1840, but it only reached to Corbeil via Juvisy. The line reached Orléans on 2 May 1843. At the time, it was the longest railway line of 114 kilometres (71 miles) in France.

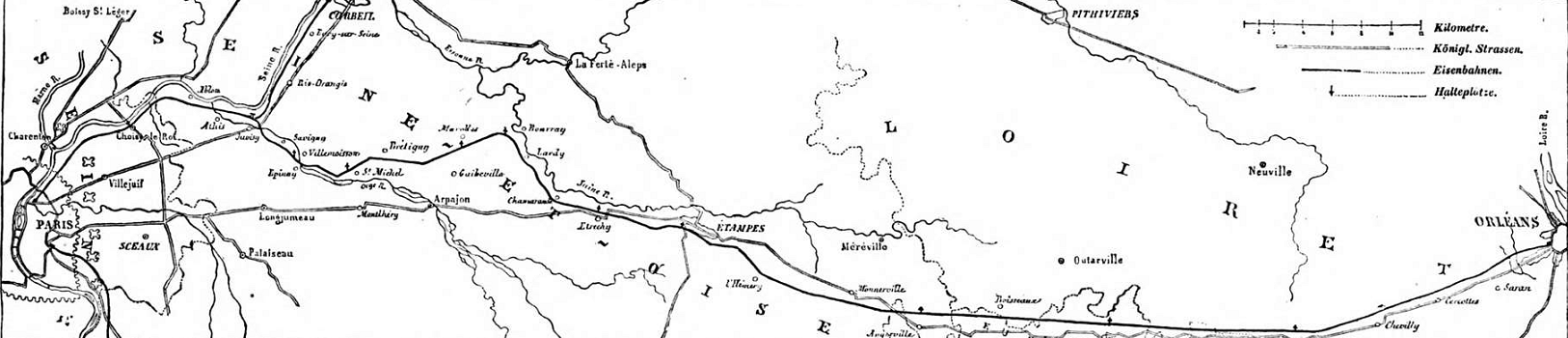
Map of the railway line from Paris to Orléans in 1843

=== First merger ===
In March 1852, with government support, Compagnie du chemin de fer de Paris à Orléans took over some companies. These were:

- Compagnie du Centre
- Compagnie du chemin de fer de Tours à Nantes
- Compagnie du chemin de fer d'Orléans à Bordeaux

In 1853 it took over the Compagnie du chemin de fer de Paris à Sceaux.

With those mergers, the Compagnie du chemin de fer de Paris à Orléans had almost reached its final extent.

From 1852 to 1934, it was the second largest French private railway. From the Gare d'Austerlitz, the network extended over the territory from the Loire and Garonne to Orléans and Tours. From there, the branches led to Vendôme, Le Mans, the Atlantic coast of Angers, Nantes, St Nazaire to Landerneau, south of Villefranche, Clermont-Ferrand and Toulouse, south-west of Poitiers and Angoulême to Bordeaux.

=== Network in 1912 ===
Network	Length (km)	Length (miles)
Licensed home network	5,116	3,179
Franchised new lines, standard gauge	2,351	1,461
Franchised new lines, narrow gauge	323	201
Total network	7,790	4,840

=== Second merger and nationalization ===
In 1934, Compagnie du chemin de fer de Paris à Orléans (PO) was merged with the Chemin de Fer du Midi into Chemin de Fer de Paris à Orléans et du Midi (PO-Midi)". After the merger, the new PO-Midi's network was almost 12,000 kilometres (7,500 miles).

To create an efficient, uniform and nationwide network under state control, on 1 January 1938, it was nationalized with five other companies to become a part of the newly founded SNCF. Then this also took on more rail activities of five other companies.

== Legacy ==
After the Second World War, the banking family Rothschild family took over the remains of the Paris Orléans and transformed it into a holding company for its banking activities and corporate investments.
