= Corentin Celton station =

Paris Métro station in Issy-les-Moulineaux

Corentin Celton
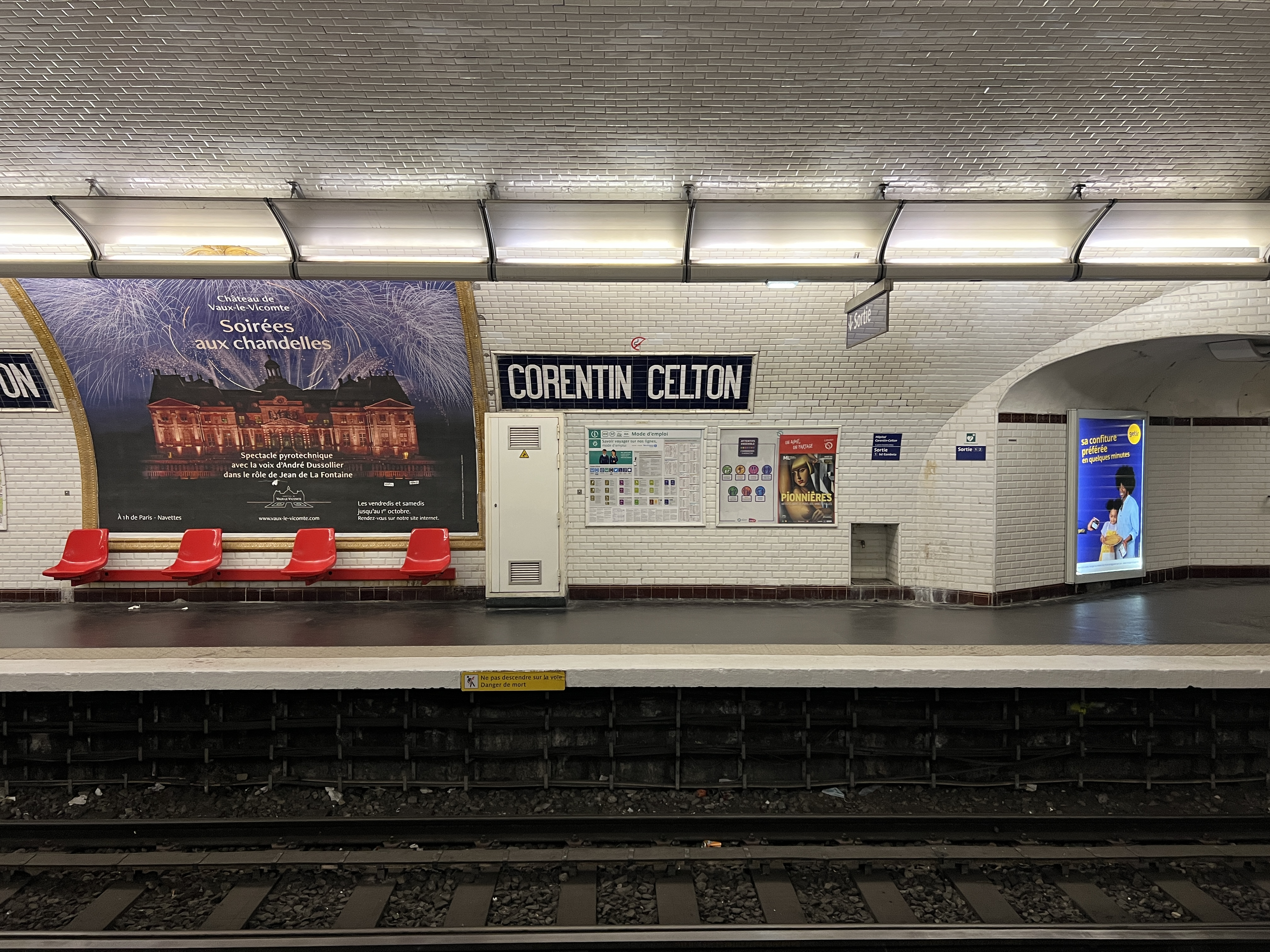
- Platforms

General information
- Location: Issy-les-Moulineaux; Île-de-France; France
- Coordinates: 48°49′37″N 2°16′44″E
- System: Paris Métro station
- Owner: RATP
- Operator: RATP
- Line: Paris Metro Paris Metro Line 12
- Platforms: 2 (side platforms)
- Tracks: 2

Construction
- Accessible: no

Other information
- Station code: 2802
- Fare zone: 2

History
- Opened: 24 March 1934
- Former names: Petits Ménages (24 March 1934 – 14 October 1945)

Passengers
- 2,504,682 (2021)

Services
Preceding station	Paris Metro	Following station
Mairie d'Issy Terminus	Line 12	Porte de Versailles towards Mairie d'Aubervilliers
Location
- Location within Paris

Corentin Celton (French pronunciation: [kɔʁɑ̃tɛ̃ sɛltɔ̃]), formerly Petits Ménages (1934–1945), is a station on Line 12 of the Paris Métro. It is located in the suburban commune of Issy-les-Moulineaux, Hauts-de-Seine.

== History ==
The station opened as Petits Ménages on 24 March 1934 as part of the extension of the line from Porte de Versailles. It was then named after the nearby hospice des Petits-ménage, a retirement home for elderly couples, as well as widows and widowers capable of paying a modest fee. The hospice was relocated from the 7th arrondissement of Paris to Issy-les-Moulineaux in 1863, leaving a large area for the expansion of Le Bon Marché department store.

On 15 October 1945, the station was renamed Corentin Celton, after the hospice was renamed Hôpital Corentin-Celton in February that year. Its namesake, Corentin Celton (1901–1943), was an employee there and was a member of the French Resistance; he was shot by the Nazis at Fort Mont-Valérien. Hence, the station, along with 7 other stations, were renamed after the Second World War to honour the resistance fighters who had died for France. The other stations were: Charles Michels, Colonel Fabien, Corentin Cariou, Guy Môquet, Jacques Bonsergent, Marx Dormoy, and Trinité - d'Estienne d'Orves.

As part of the "Un métro + beau" programme by the RATP, the station's corridors and platform lighting were renovated and modernised during the 2000s.

In 2019, the station was used by 3,438,335 passengers, making it the 144th busiest of the Métro network out of 302 stations.

In 2020, the station was used by 1,774,654 passengers amidst the COVID-19 pandemic, making it the 138th busiest of the Métro network out of 304 stations.

In 2021, the station was used by 2,504,682 passengers, making it the 134th busiest of the Métro network out of 304 stations.

== Passenger services ==
=== Access ===
The station has 3 accesses:

- Access 1: Boulevard Gambetta
- Access 2: rue Ernest Renan
- Access 3: Place Paul Vaillant-Couturier (an ascending escalator)

=== Station layout ===
Street Level
B1	Mezzanine
Platform level	Side platform, doors will open on the right
Platform level	Southbound	← toward Mairie d'Issy (Terminus)
Platform level	Northbound	toward Mairie d'Aubervilliers (Porte de Versailles) →
Platform level	Side platform, doors will open on the right

=== Platforms ===
The station has a standard configuration with 2 tracks surrounded by 2 side platforms. It is one of only two stations on the line to be decorated in the style of the Compagnie du chemin de fer métropolitain de Paris (CMP) instead of the Nord-Sud style used on the other stations, with the other station being Mairie d'Issy. The Nord-Sud company was absorbed by the CMP in 1930.

=== Other connections ===
The station is also served by lines 126, 189, 394, and TUVIM of the RATP bus network, and at night, by line N62 of the Noctilien bus network.

== Nearby ==
- Église Maronite Saints-Sauveur-et-Maroun d'Issy-les-Moulineaux
- Hôpital Corentin-Celton
- Parc omnisports Suzanne-Lenglen
- Paris Expo Porte de Versailles
- Saint-Sulpice Seminary

== Culture ==
The station was featured in the first chapter of Je m'en vais, a French novel by Jean Echenoz that received the Prix Goncourt. It was published in September 1999.

It was also featured in the 2016 comic adaption of Nestor Burma contre C.Q.F.D. by Emmanuel Moynot, a French detective novel originally published in 1945 by Jacques Tardi.

== Gallery ==
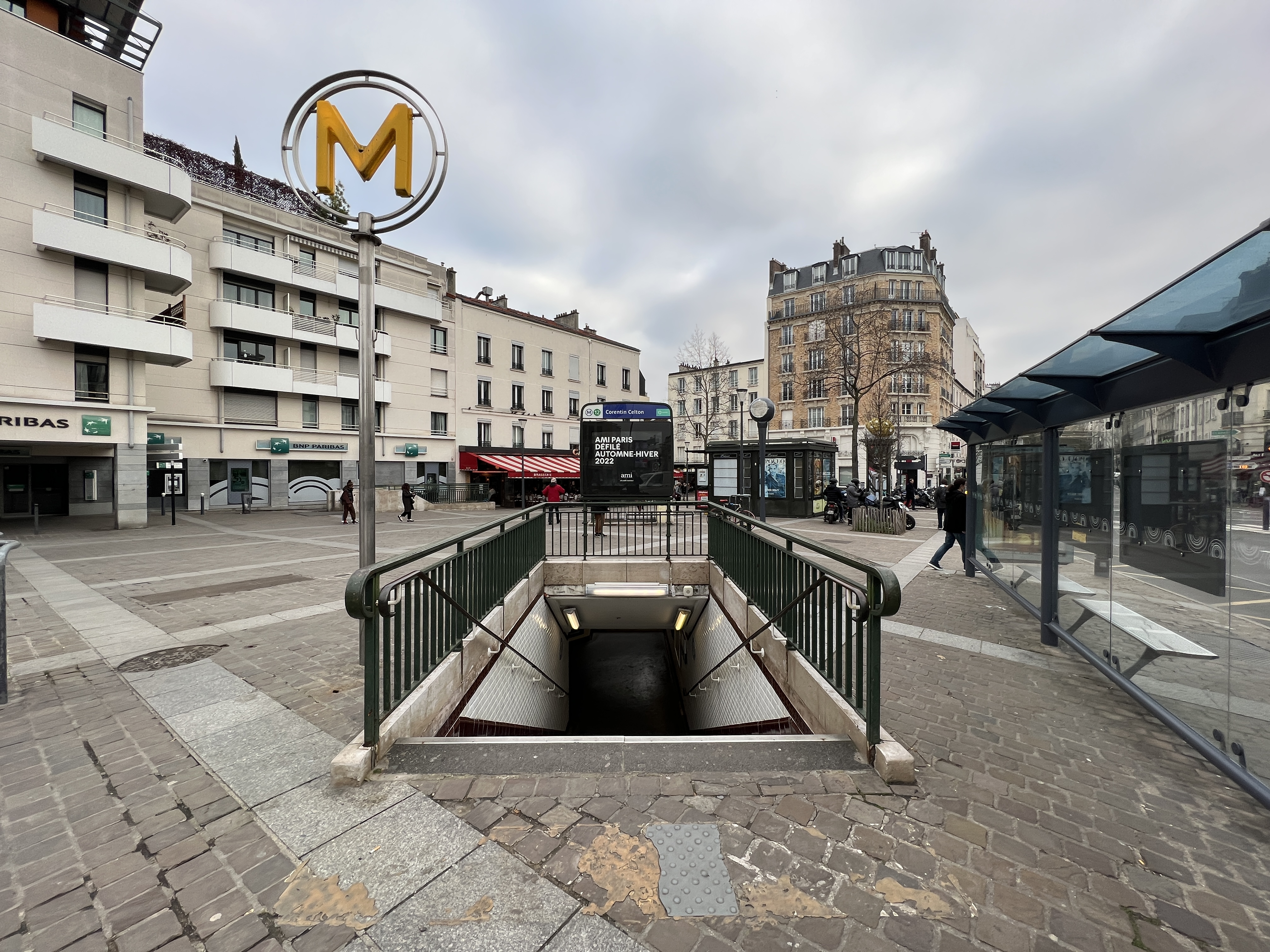
Access 1

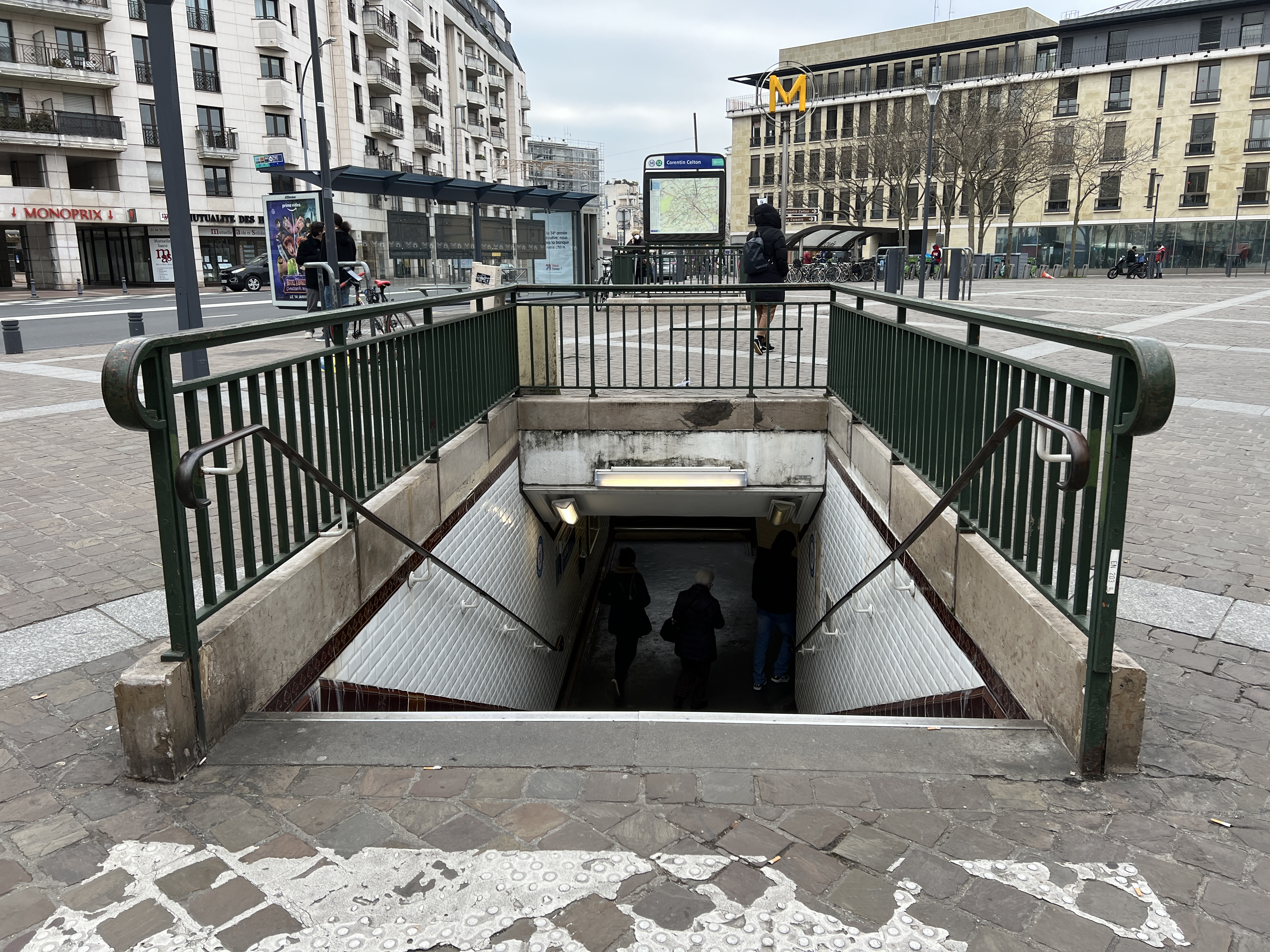
Access 2

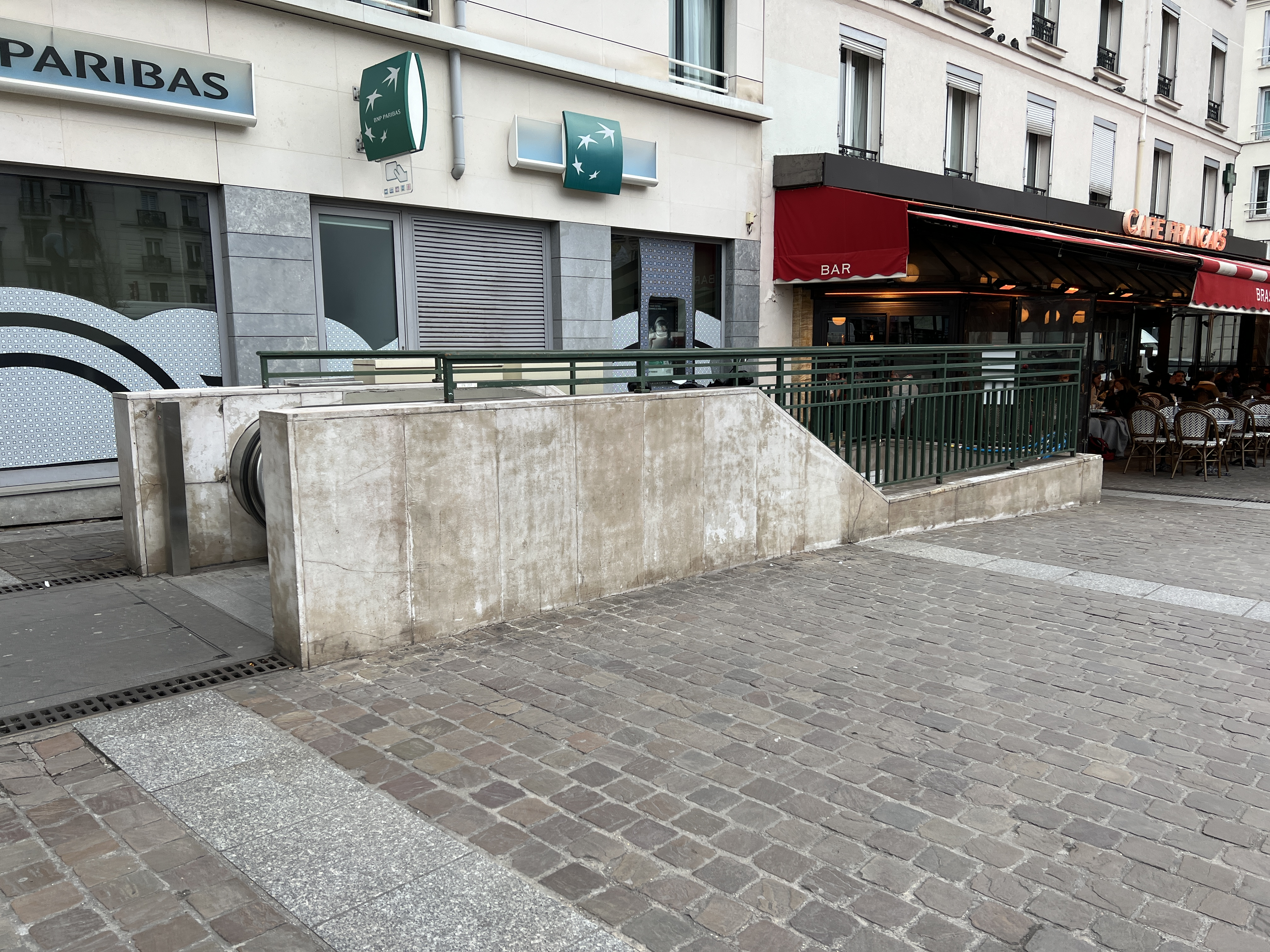
Access 3
