= We Three =

We Three may refer to:

- "We three", a personal pronoun in certain languages (See "we")
- We Three (novel) (aka Nous trois), a 1992 novel by Jean Echenoz
- We Three (Roy Haynes album), a 1959 album by Roy Haynes with Phineas Newborn and Paul Chambers
- We Three (Stanley Cowell album), a 1989 album by Stanley Cowell with Frederick Waits and Buster Williams
- "We Three (My Echo, My Shadow and Me)", 1940 song by Frank Sinatra and the Tommy Dorsey Orchestra
- "We Three", a song by the Patti Smith Group on the 1978 album Easter
- We Three, a band that appeared on The Monkees 1969 TV Special 33⅓ Revolutions per Monkee
- We Three, a band appearing on America's Got Talent (season 13)
- We Three, a songwriting team of Bettye Crutcher, Homer Davis, and Raymond Jackson
- "We 3", a song by Soul Asylum on the 1990 album And the Horse They Rode In On
- We3, a 2004 comic book miniseries
