= Notre-Dame-de-Lorette station =

Metro station in Paris, France

Notre-Dame-de-Lorette
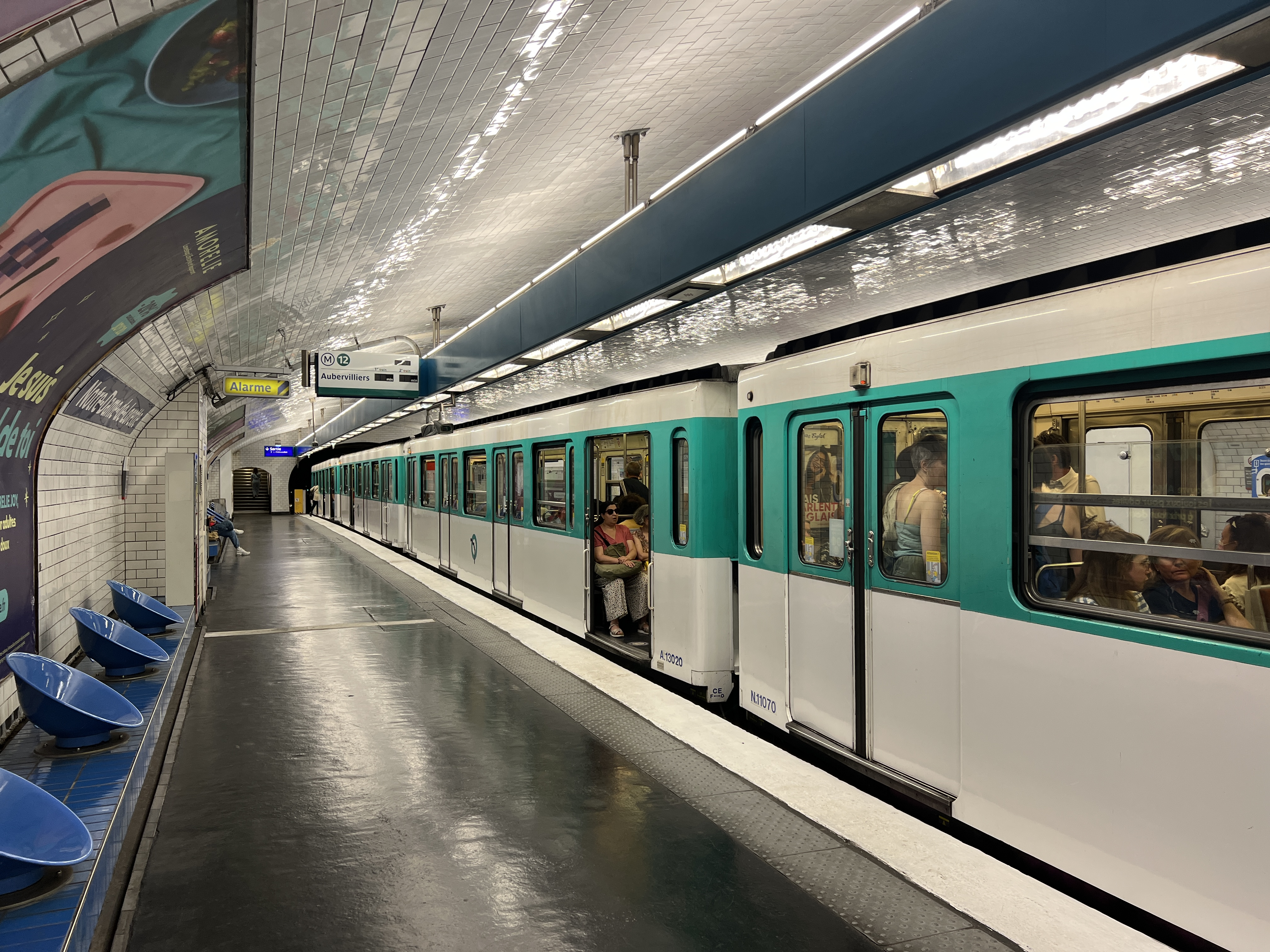

General information
- Location: 9th arrondissement of Paris; Île-de-France; France
- Coordinates: 48°52′34″N 2°20′14″E
- System: Paris Métro station
- Owner: RATP
- Operator: RATP

Other information
- Fare zone: 1

History
- Opened: 5 November 1910

Services
Preceding station	Paris Metro	Following station
Trinité–d'Estienne d'Orves towards Mairie d'Issy	Line 12	Saint-Georges towards Mairie d'Aubervilliers
Location
- Location within Paris

Notre-Dame-de-Lorette (French pronunciation: [nɔtʁə dam də lɔʁɛt]) is a station on Line 12 of the Paris Métro in the 9th arrondissement.

The station opened on 5 November 1910 as part of the original section of the Nord-Sud company's line A between Porte de Versailles and Notre-Dame-de-Lorette. It was the northern terminus of the line until its extension to Pigalle on 8 April 1911. On 27 March 1931 line A became line 12 of the Métro. The station is named after the nearby church Notre-Dame-de-Lorette. The name of the church refers to the Italian city of Loreto and its Chiesa della Casa Santa (Church of the Holy House), a centre of Marianism.

The station is located within a short walking distance from Le Peletier station on line 7, but no free transfer is permitted.

== Incidents ==
On 30 August 2000 at 13:21, the head car of an MF 67 overturned in the tunnel on its southbound approach from Saint-Georges. Only the front carriage derailed, however it remained attached to the following carriages. After overturning, the derailed carriage slid on its side for 134 metres before crashing into the bulkhead of the northbound platform at Notre-Dame-de-Lorette. Twenty-four people were injured in the incident.

== Station layout ==
Street Level

B1	Mezzanine

Line 12 platforms	Side platform, doors will open on the right
Line 12 platforms	Southbound	← toward Mairie d'Issy (Trinité – d'Estienne d'Orves)
Line 12 platforms	Northbound	toward Mairie d'Aubervilliers (Saint-Georges) →
Line 12 platforms	Side platform, doors will open on the right
