= Saint-Georges station =

Metro station in Paris, France

Saint-Georges
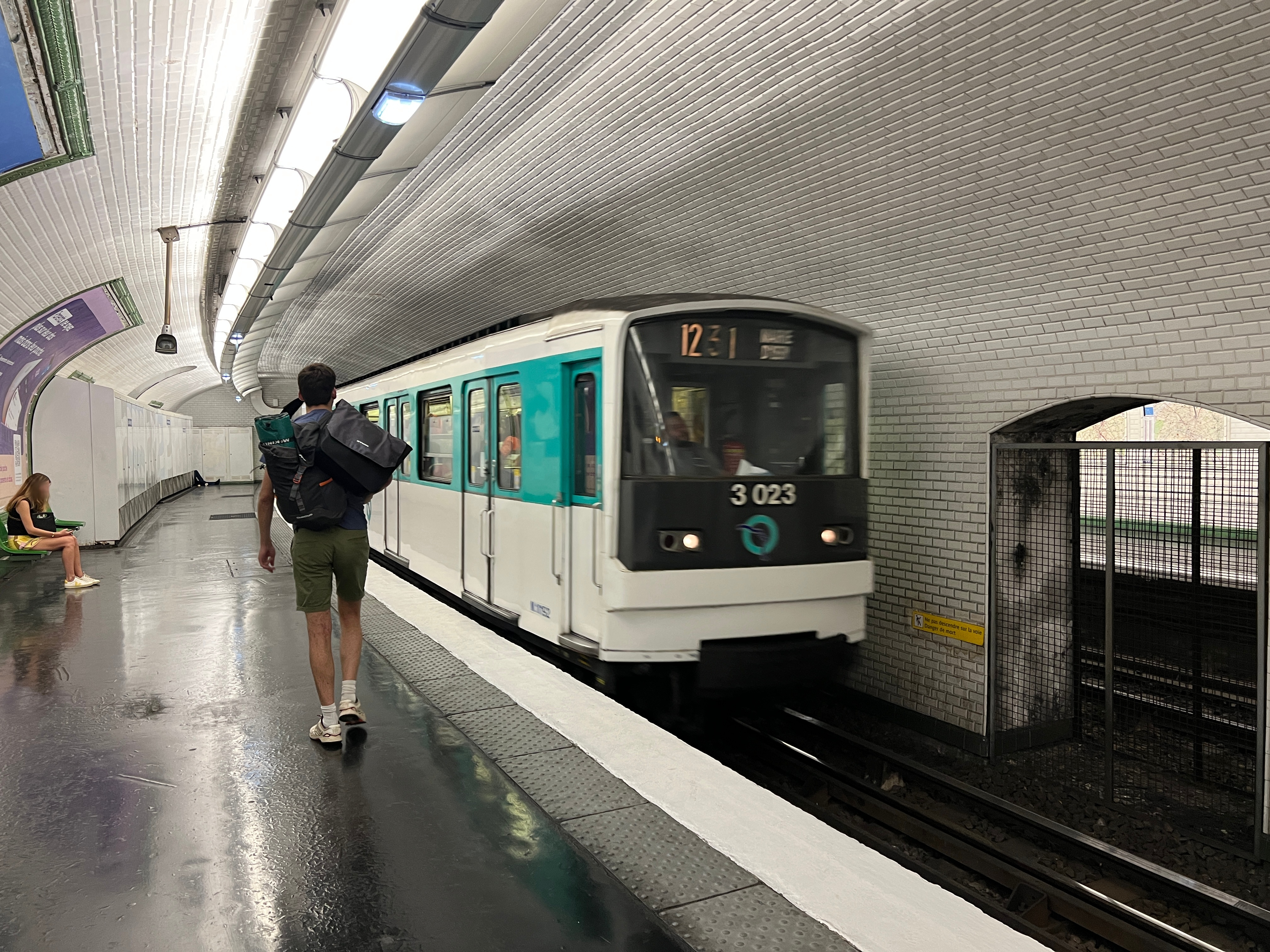

General information
- Location: 9th arrondissement of Paris; Île-de-France; France
- Coordinates: 48°52′42″N 2°20′15″E
- System: Paris Métro station
- Owner: RATP
- Operator: RATP

Other information
- Fare zone: 1

History
- Opened: 8 April 1911

Services
Preceding station	Paris Metro	Following station
Notre-Dame-de-Lorette towards Mairie d'Issy	Line 12	Pigalle towards Mairie d'Aubervilliers
Location
- Location within Paris

Saint-Georges (French pronunciation: [sɛ̃ ʒɔʁʒ]) is a station on Line 12 of the Paris Métro in the 9th arrondissement.

The station opened on 8 April 1911 as part of the extension of the Nord-Sud company's line A from Notre-Dame-de-Lorette to Pigalle. On 27 March 1931 line A became line 12 of the Métro. The station is named after the Rue Saint-Georges, which became a street in 1734 and leads to the Place Saint-Georges, created in 1824. It was the centre of an estate created by the speculator Dosne, father-in-law of the politician Adolphe Thiers.

It was renovated during the early 2000s in imitation of the style adopted by the Nord-Sud Company, the original architects of the station. In fact, the current decorative style only vaguely resembles the original: the station name is no longer shown on large ceramic tablets (as at Solférino and Abbesses) and does not follow the original colour-coding: the edge of the ceramic name tablets should be brown to designate a non-interchange station, rather than green.

== Station layout ==
Street Level

B1	Mezzanine

Line 12 platforms	Side platform, doors will open on the right
Line 12 platforms	Southbound	← toward Mairie d'Issy (Notre-Dame-de-Lorette)
Line 12 platforms	Northbound	toward Mairie d'Aubervilliers (Pigalle) →
Line 12 platforms	Side platform, doors will open on the right
