= Pigalle station =

Metro station in Paris, France

Pigalle
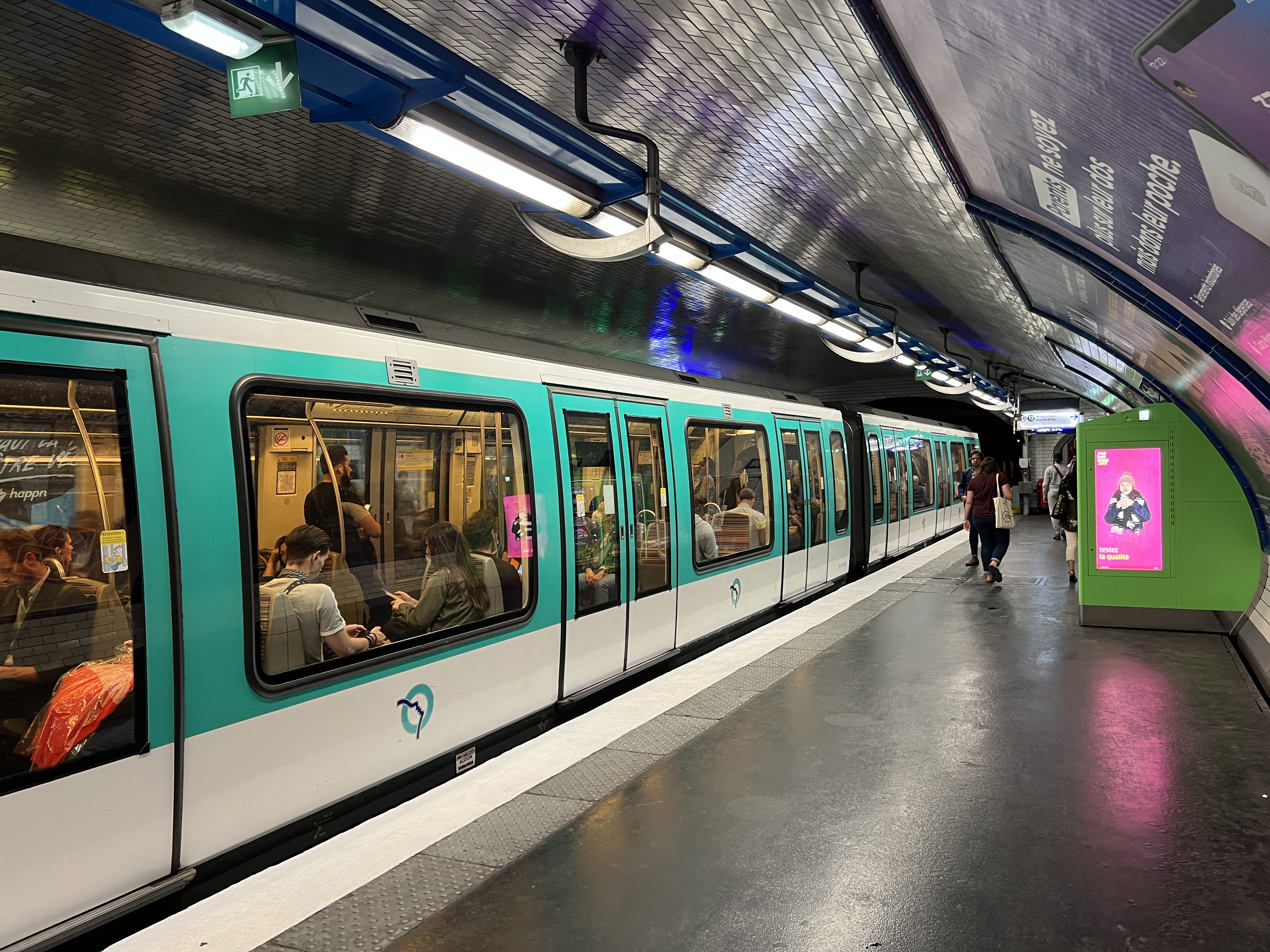

General information
- Location: 16, boul. de Clichy; 26, boul. de Clichy; 18th arrondissement of Paris; Île-de-France; France
- Coordinates: 48°52′56″N 2°20′15″E
- Owner: RATP
- Operator: RATP

Other information
- Fare zone: 1

History
- Opened: 7 October 1902 (Line 2); 8 April 1911 (Line 12)

Services
Preceding station	Paris Metro	Following station
Blanche towards Porte Dauphine	Line 2	Anvers towards Nation
Saint-Georges towards Mairie d'Issy	Line 12	Abbesses towards Mairie d'Aubervilliers
Location
- Location within Paris

Pigalle (French pronunciation: [piɡal]) is a station on lines 2 and 12 of the Paris Métro, named after the Place Pigalle, which commemorates the sculptor Jean-Baptiste Pigalle (1714–1785) on the border of the 9th and the 18th arrondissement. The station is located under the Boulevard de Clichy in Montmartre and serves the famous Pigalle red-light district.

== Location ==
The station is located under Place Pigalle, the platforms being established:

- on line 2 (between Blanche and Anvers stations), east of the said square and oriented east–west, along the axis of Boulevard de Clichy;
- on line 12 (between Abbesses and Saint-Georges), in a curve at the end of Rue Frochot, partly under the tunnel of line 2 which it crosses perpendicularly.

== History ==
The station was opened on 21 October 1902 as part of the extension of line 2 from Étoile to Anvers. The line 12 platforms were opened on 8 April 1911 with the extension of the Nord-Sud Company's line A from Notre-Dame-de-Lorette. It was the northern terminus of line C until its extension to Jules Joffrin on 31 October 1912. This line was taken over by the Compagnie du chemin de fer métropolitain de Paris and was renamed line 12 on 27 March 1931.

The Place Pigalle was named after the Barrière Pigalle, a gate built for the collection of taxation as part of the Wall of the Farmers-General; the gate was built between 1784 and 1788 and demolished in the 19th century.

Like a third of the stations on the network, between 1974 and 1984, the platforms on line 12 were modernized in the Andreu-Motte style, orange with flat white tiles. For its part, the stopping point on line 2, received a Ouï-dire style layout after 1988, blue in this case.

As part of the RATP's Renouveau du métro program, the station's corridors were renovated on 29 April 2005. The lighting canopies in the connecting corridors then had the distinction of being punctuated by a few tubes diffusing a light blue, later white.

In 2019, 5,599,495 travelers entered this station which placed it in 71st position of the metro stations for its usage.

== Passenger services ==
=== Access ===
The station has an entrance titled Place Pigalle, divided into three metro outlets established on the central reservation of Boulevard de Clichy, the main one, located east of the place, is adorned with a Guimard édicule. This one, designed in 1900 by Hector Guimard, is the subject of a decrees as a historic monuments on 12 February 2016. The two other metro outlets, located more in the center of the square at no. 20 and 22 of the boulevard, are decorated with balustrades in the style characteristic of the Nord-Sud company.

=== Station layout ===
G Street Level
M	Mezzanine for platform connection
Line 2 platforms	Side platform, doors will open on the right
Line 2 platforms	Platform 1	← toward Porte Dauphine (Blanche)
Line 2 platforms	Platform 2	toward Nation (Anvers) →
Line 2 platforms	Side platform, doors will open on the right
Line 12 platforms	Side platform, doors will open on the right
Line 12 platforms	Platform 2	← toward Mairie d'Issy (Saint-Georges)
Line 12 platforms	Platform 1	toward Mairie d'Aubervilliers (Abbesses) →
Line 12 platforms	Side platform, doors will open on the right

=== Platforms ===
The platforms of the two lines are of standard configuration. Two in number per stop, they are separated by the metro tracks located in the centre and the vault is elliptical.

The station on line 2 is fitted out in a blue Ouï-dire style. The lighting canopies, of the same colour, are supported by curved hook in the shape of a scythe. The direct lighting is white while the indirect lighting, projected on the vault, is multicoloured. The white ceramic tiles are flat and cover the walls, the vault, and the tunnel exit. The advertising frames are blue and cylindrical, and the name of the station is written in Parisine font on enamelled plates. The platforms are equipped with blue 'sit-stand' benches.

The station of line 12 is established in a curve and its vault is semi-elliptical, a form specific to the old Nord-Sud stations. The decoration is in a Andreu-Motte style with two orange light canopies, benches in flat brown tiles and orange Motte seats. These arrangements are married with the flat white tiling which covers the walls, and the tunnel exits, while the vault is painted in white. The hallways are treated in classic bevelled white tiles. The advertising frames are metallic, and the name of the station is written in Parisine typography on enameled plates.

=== Bus services ===
The station is served by lines 30, 40 and 54 of the RATP Bus Network and, at night, by lines N01 and N02 of the Noctilien network.

== Nearby ==
- Place Pigalle
- Le Divan du Monde
- La Cigale
- La Boule Noire
- Avenue Frochot

== Gallery ==
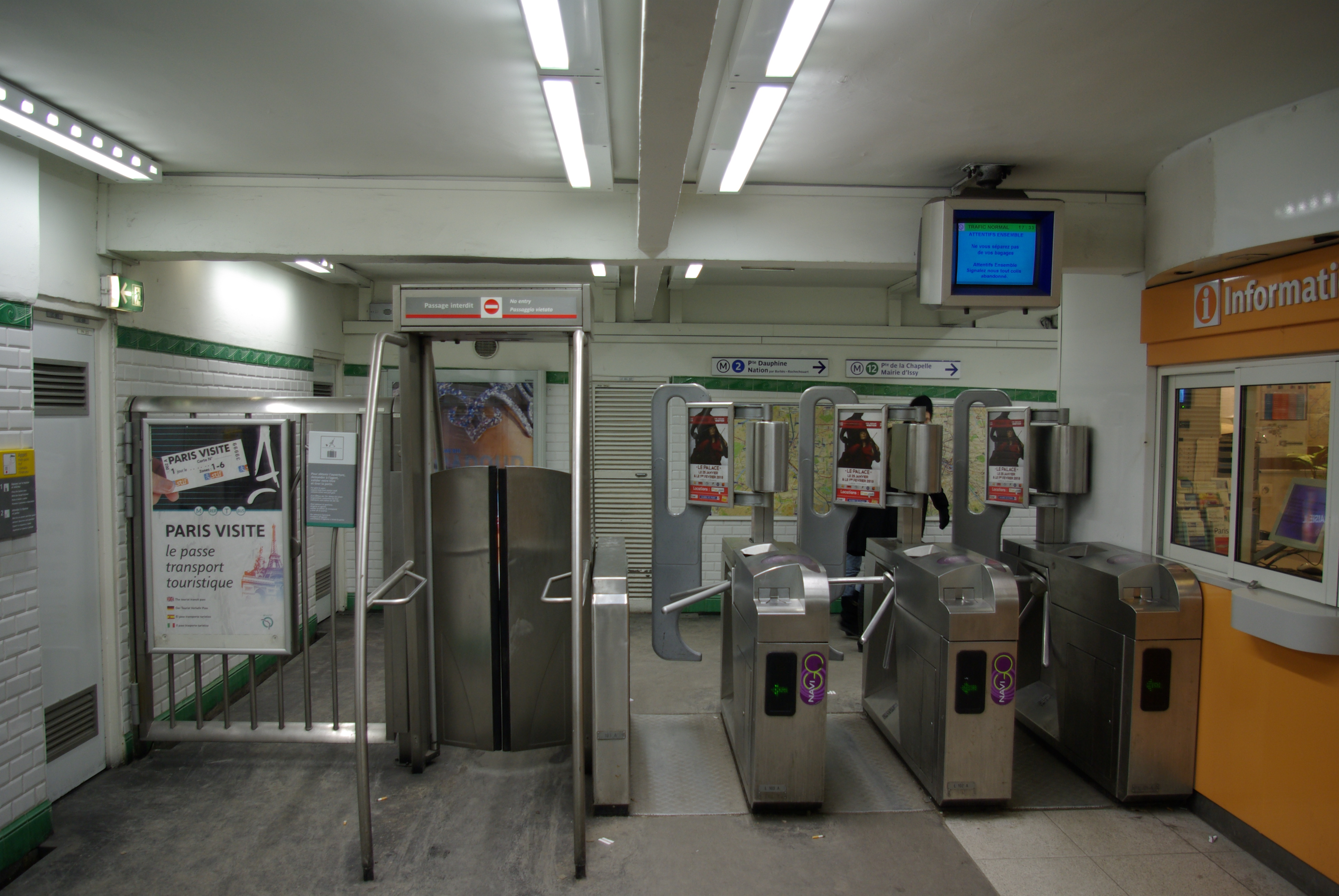
Pigalle station ticket concourse

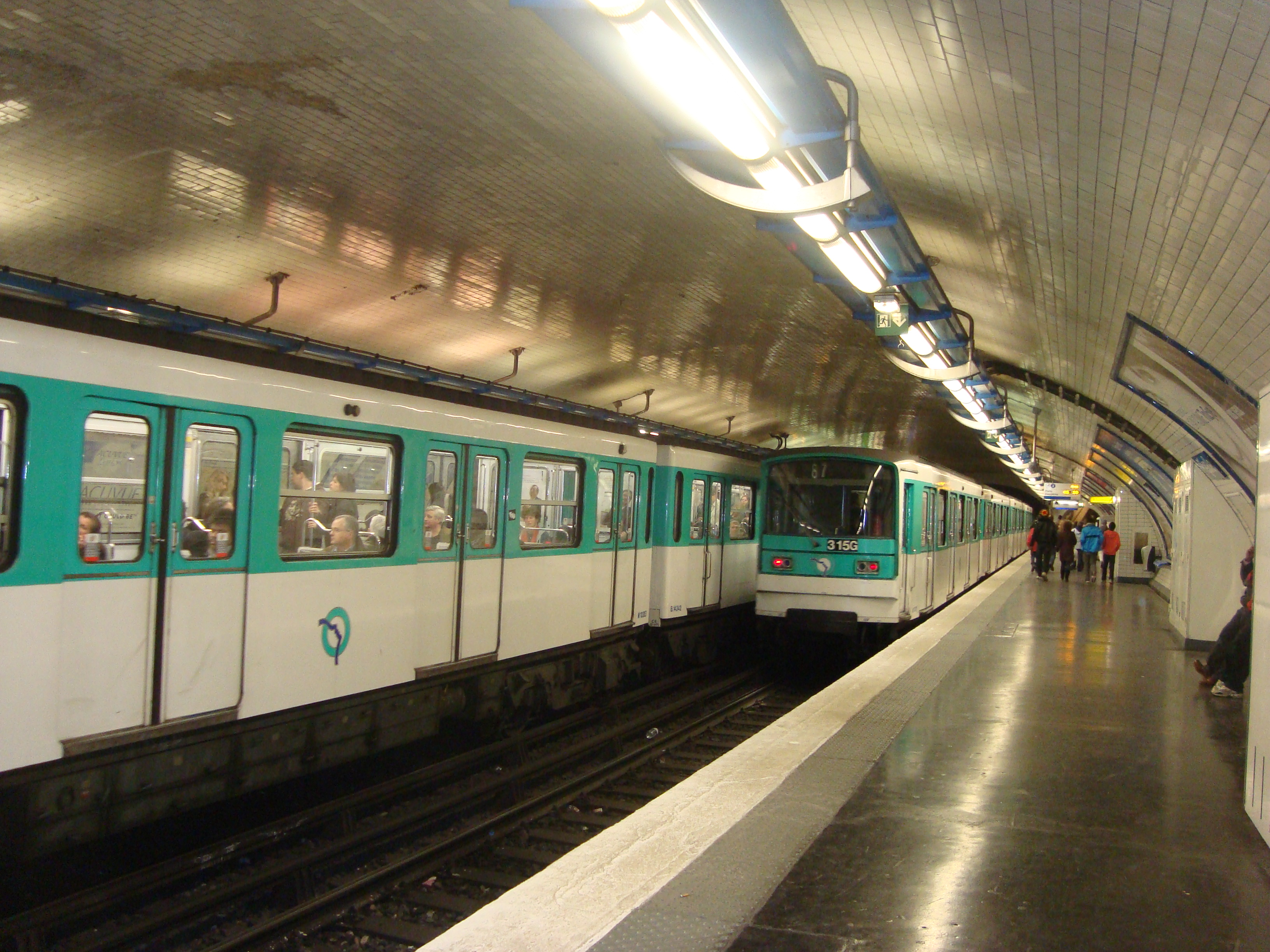
Line 2 platforms with 2 MF 67 rolling stock at Pigalle

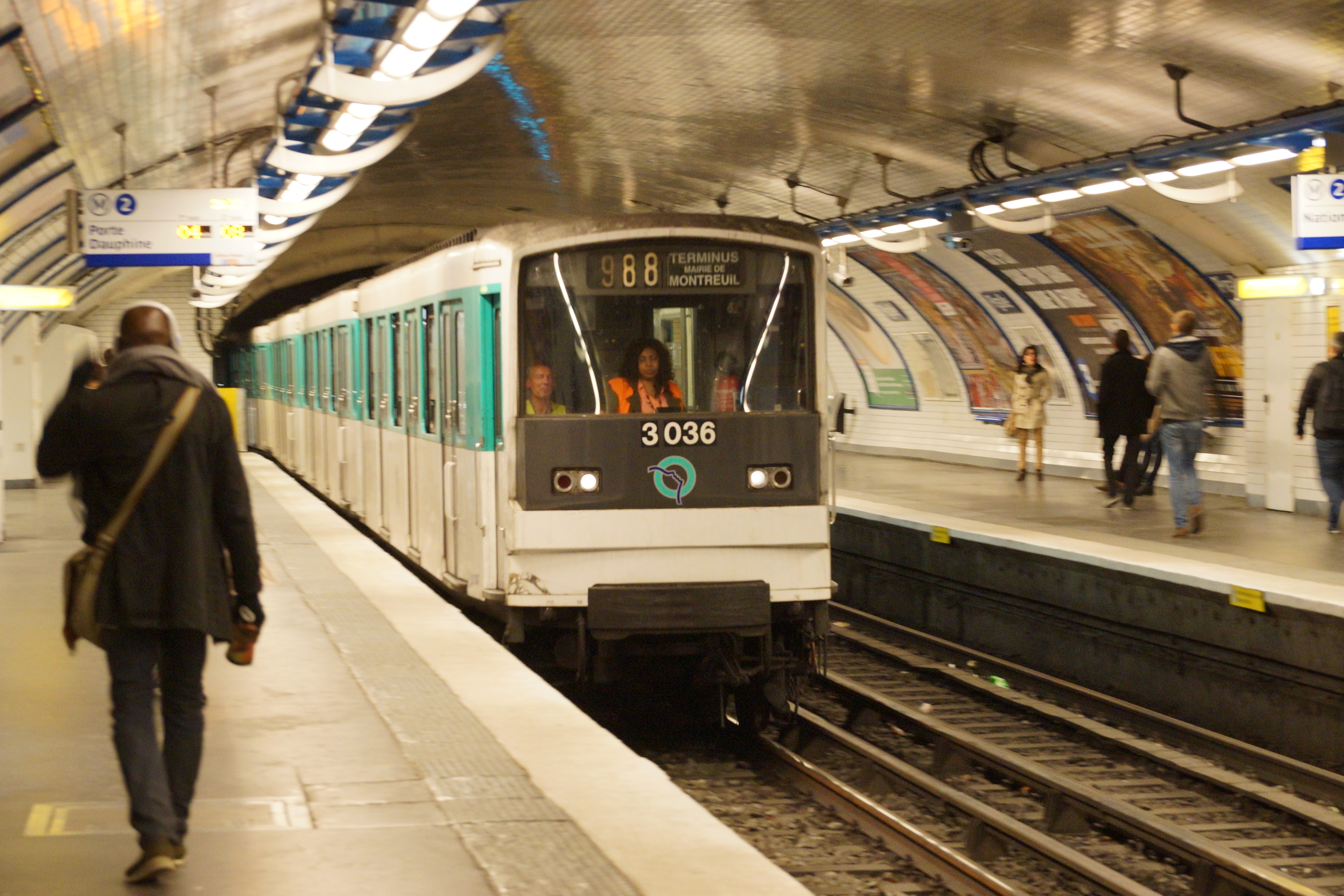
Line 9 MF 67's rolling stock transferred to Line 12

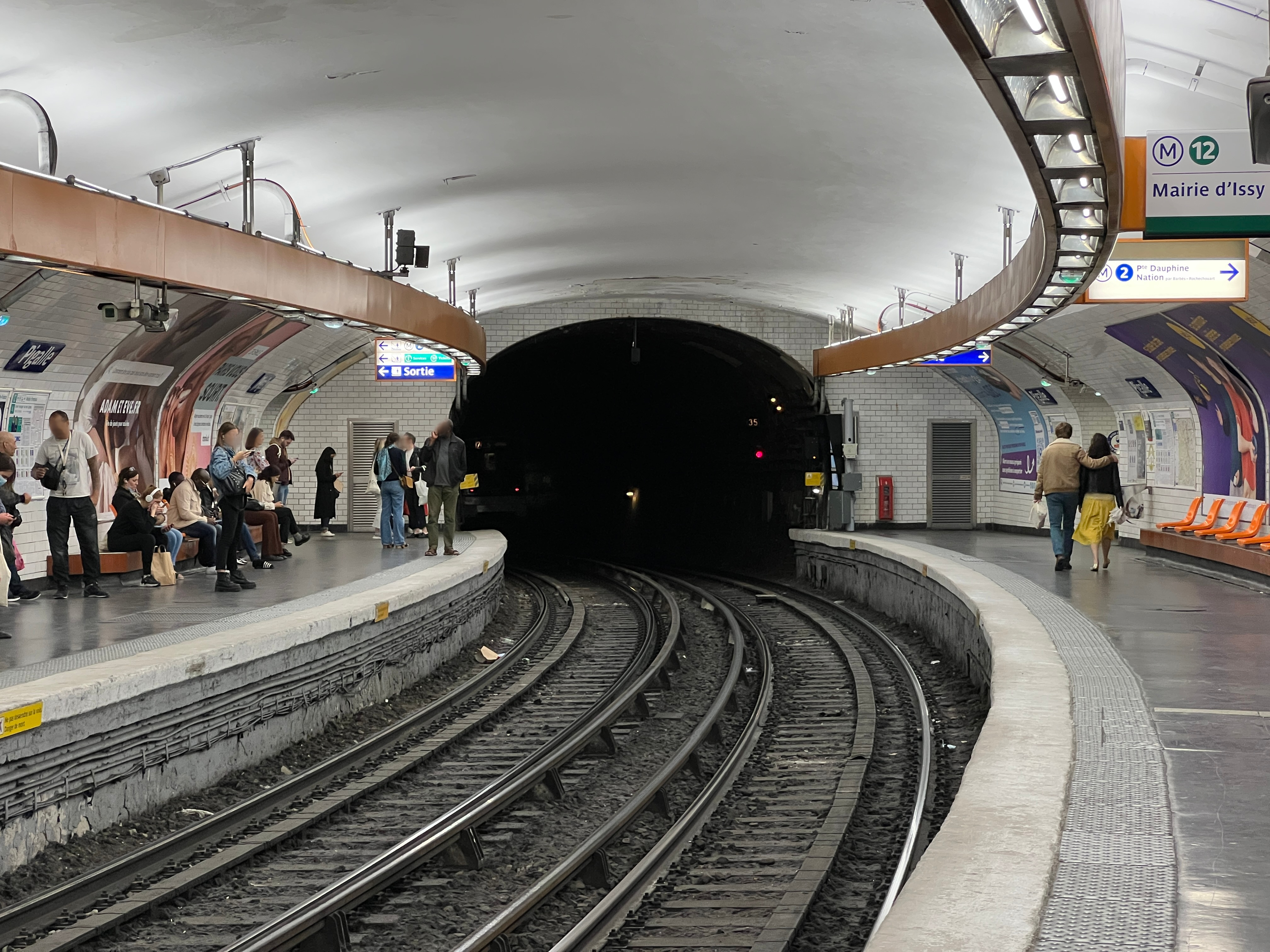
Line 12 platforms

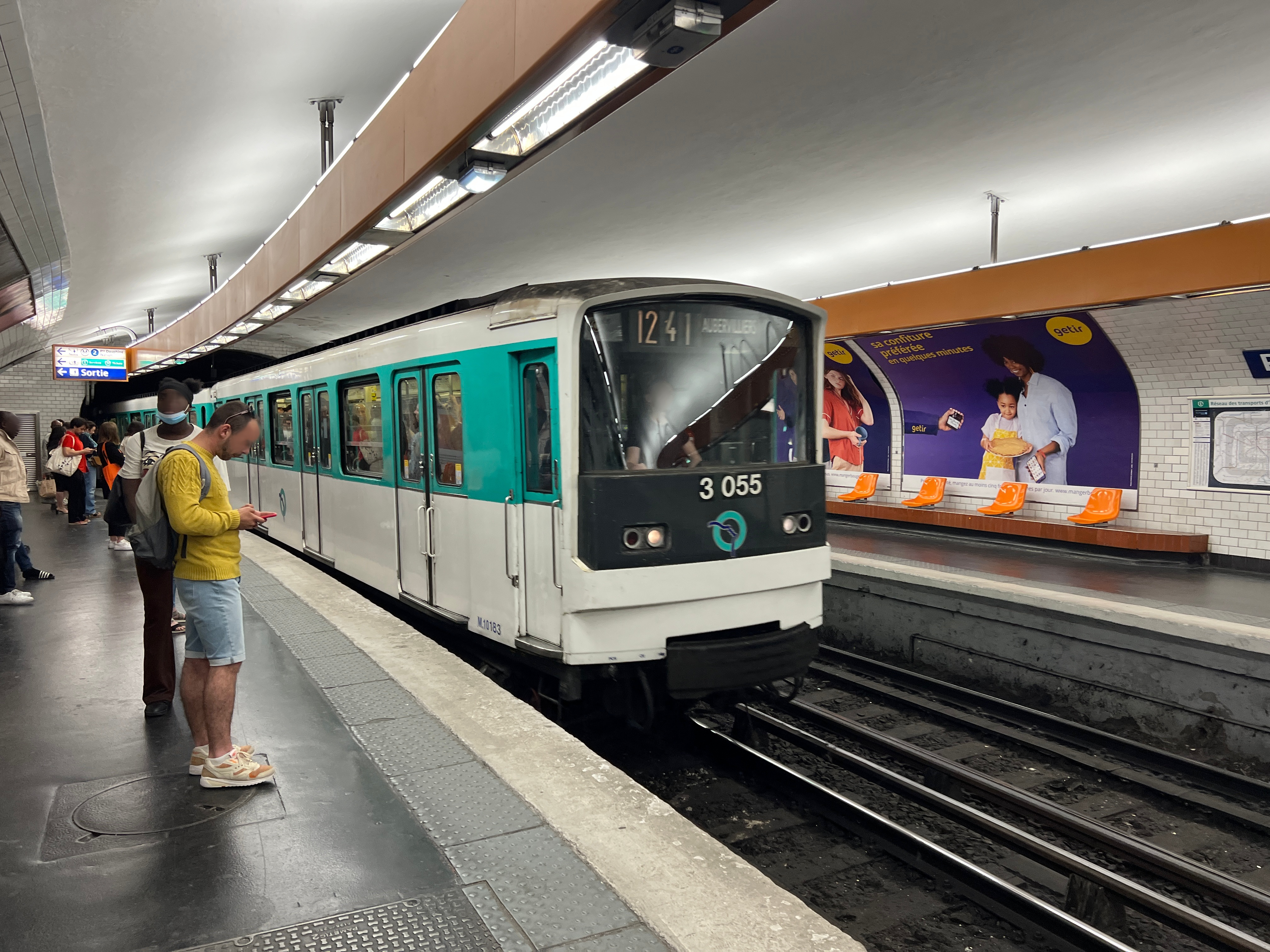
MF 67 rolling stock

Sprague-Thomson on Line 12

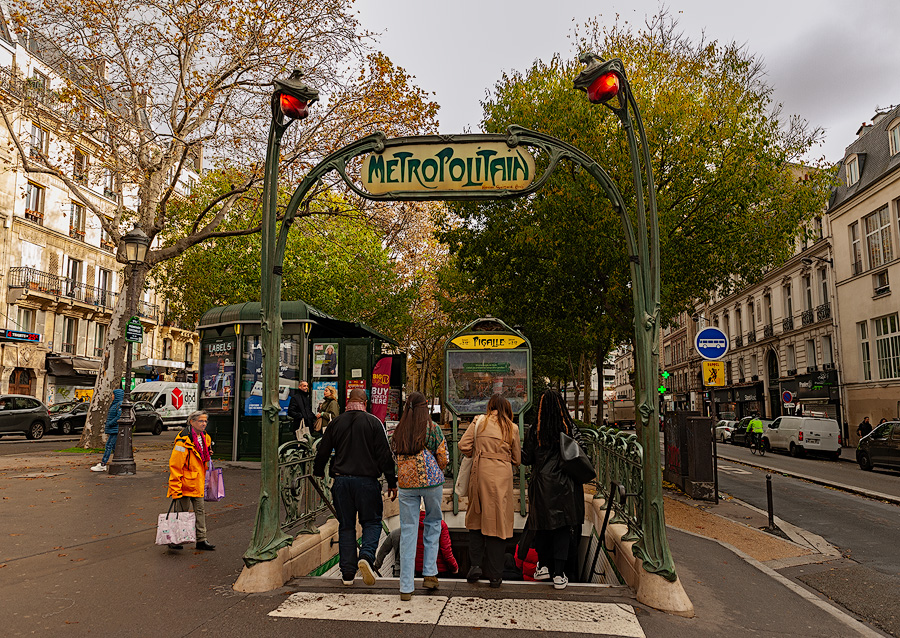
Pigalle Metro Station entrance
