= Cadet station =

Metro station in Paris, France

Cadet
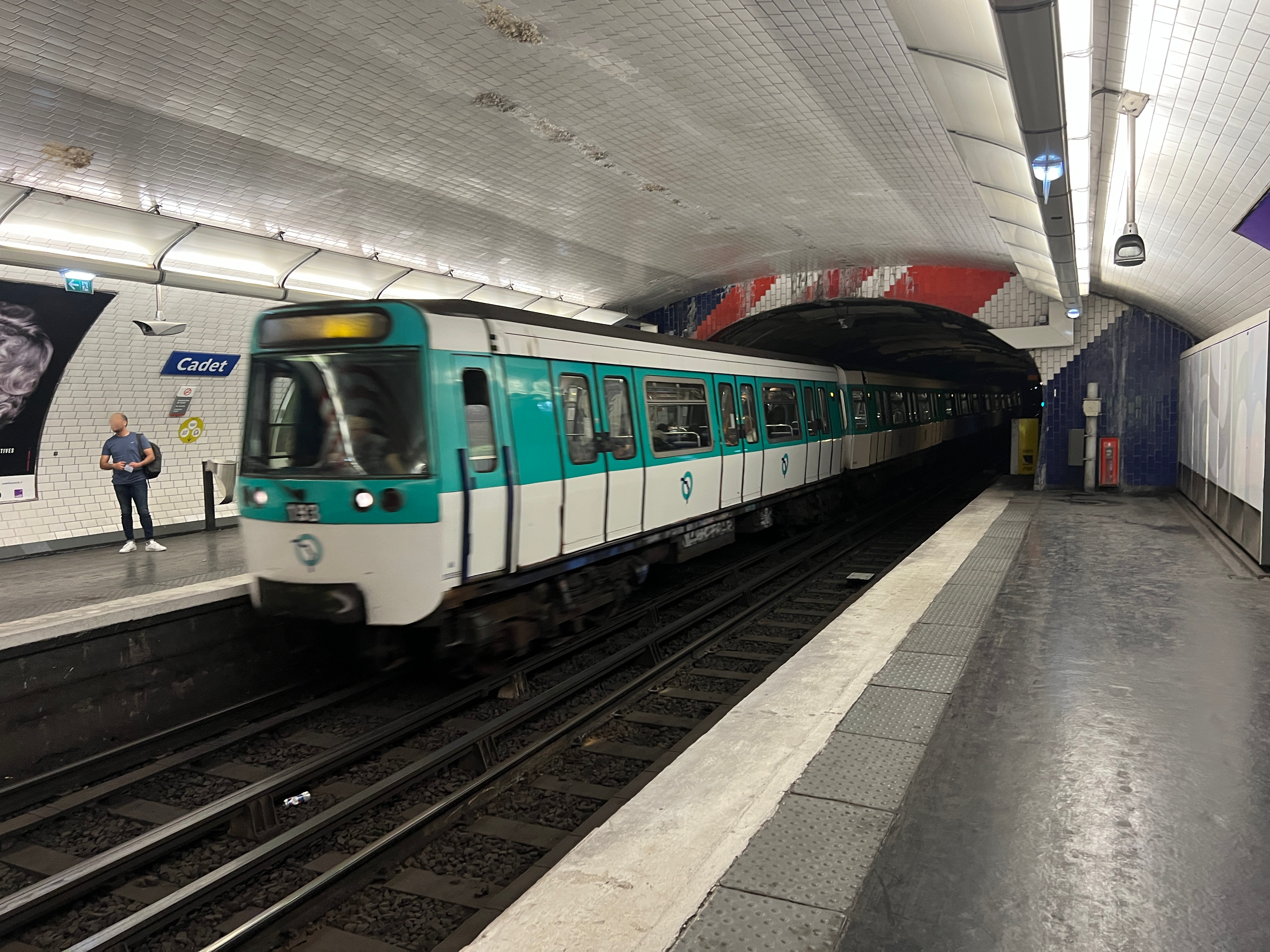
- MF 77 at Cadet

General information
- Location: Rue La Fayette; 9th arrondissement of Paris; Île-de-France; France
- Coordinates: 48°52′34″N 2°20′42″E
- System: Paris Métro station
- Owner: RATP
- Operator: RATP
- Line: Paris Metro Paris Metro Line 7
- Platforms: 2 (2 side platforms)
- Tracks: 2

Other information
- Station code: 21-03
- Fare zone: 1

History
- Opened: 5 November 1910; 115 years ago

Passengers
- 1,240,692 (2020)

Services
Preceding station	Paris Metro	Following station
Le Peletier towards Villejuif–Louis Aragon or Mairie d'Ivry	Line 7	Poissonnière towards La Courneuve–8 mai 1945
Location
- Location within Paris

Cadet (French pronunciation: [kadɛ]) is a station on Line 7 of the Paris Métro. It is named after rue Cadet, itself named after M. Cadet de Chambine, owner of much of the land through which the street passes. The street was called rue de la Voirie before being renamed.

== History ==
Cadet opened on 5 November 1910 with the commissioning of the first section of line 7 between Opéra and Porte de la Villette. In 1982, a mosaic by the French artist, Hervé Mathieu-Bachelot, Lumière en éclats, was installed in the corridor leading to the platform towards La Courneuve–8 mai 1945. As part of the "Un métro + beau" programme by the RATP, the station was renovated and modernised on 28 May 2003.

On 12 February 2016, the Guimard entrance on Rue Mathis was listed as a historical monument.

On 1 April 2016, half of the nameplates on the station's platforms were temporarily replaced by the RATP as part of April Fool's Day, along with 12 other stations. It was humorously renamed "Rousselle", a nod to the nursery rhyme by Cadet Rousselle (1743-1807) to evoke a sense of childhood.

In 2019, the station was used by 3,042,484 passengers, making it the 168th busiest of the Métro network out of 302 stations.

In 2020, the station was used by 1,240,692 passengers amidst the COVID-19 pandemic, making it the 204th busiest of the Métro network out of 305 stations.

== Passenger services ==
=== Access ===
Cadet has a single entrance along rue Cadet with a Guimard entrance.

=== Station layout ===
Street Level
B1	Mezzanine
Line 7 platforms	Side platform, doors will open on the right
Line 7 platforms	Southbound	← toward Villejuif – Louis Aragon or Mairie d'Ivry (Riquet)
Line 7 platforms	Northbound	toward La Courneuve–8 mai 1945 (Corentin Cariou) →
Line 7 platforms	Side platform, doors will open on the right

=== Platforms ===
Cadet has a standard configuration with 2 tracks surrounded by 2 side platforms. The platforms are decorated using the colours and patterns of the flag of the United States, due to its location under rue La Fayette, which pays homage to the general who had fought alongside the Americans during the American Revolutionary War. Hence, white, blue, and red beveled ceramic tiles line the walls of the vault, the ceilings, and at the ends of the platforms.

=== Other connections ===
The station is served by lines 26, 32, 43, 45, 48, and 85 of the RATP bus network.

== Gallery ==
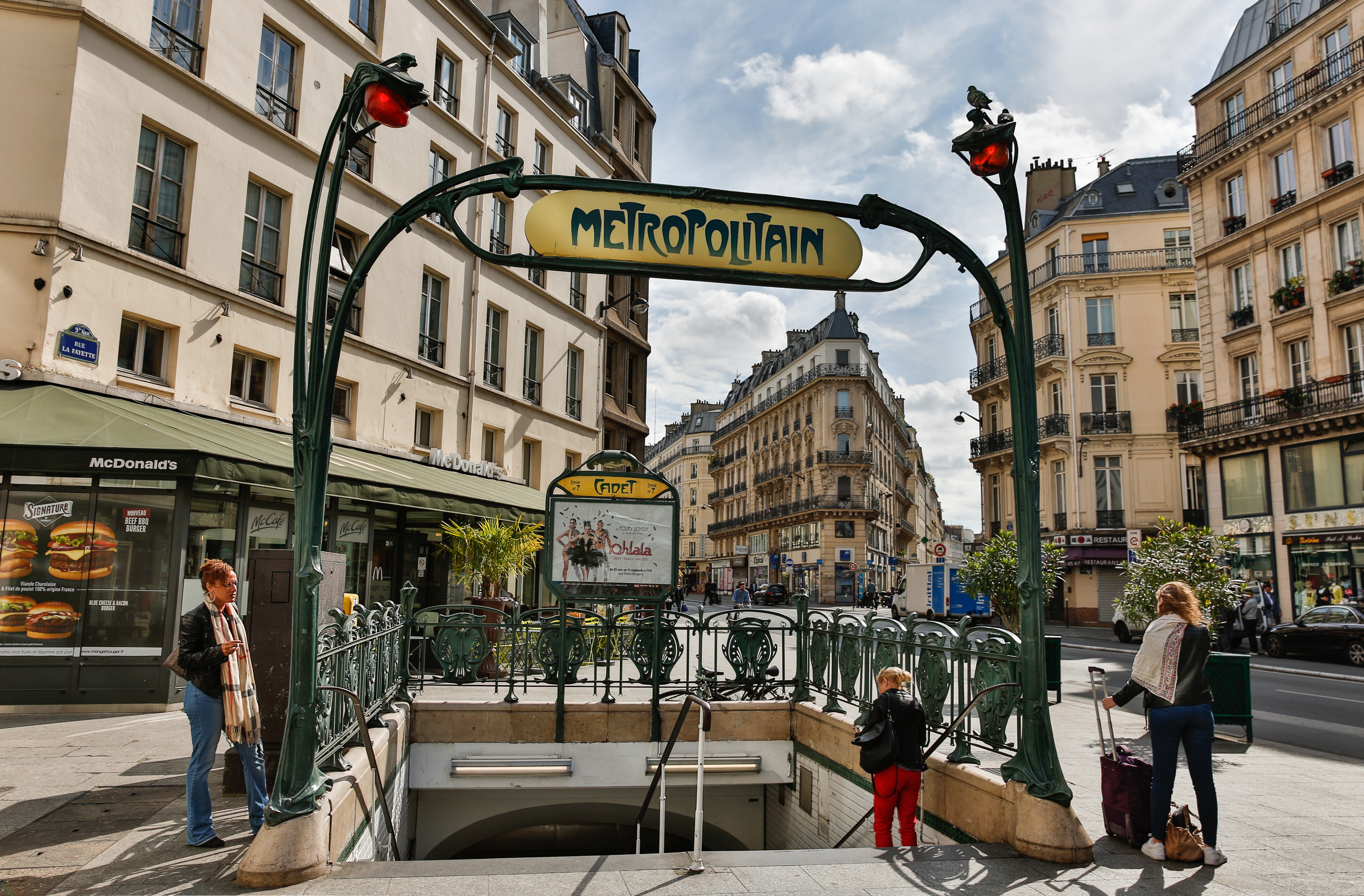
Guimard entrance at rue de Cadet

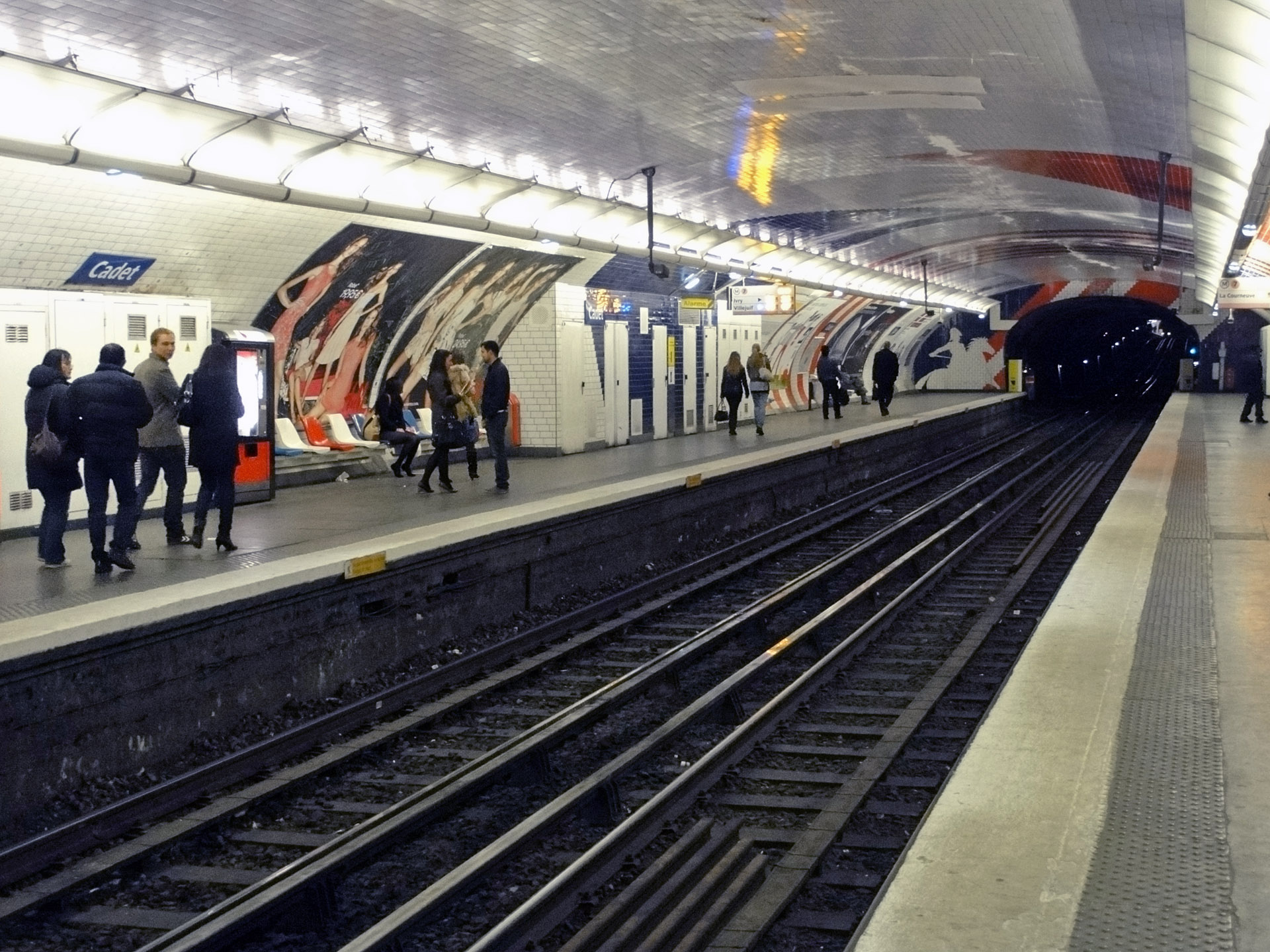
Platforms
