= Anvers station =

Metro station in Paris, France

Anvers Sacré-Cœur
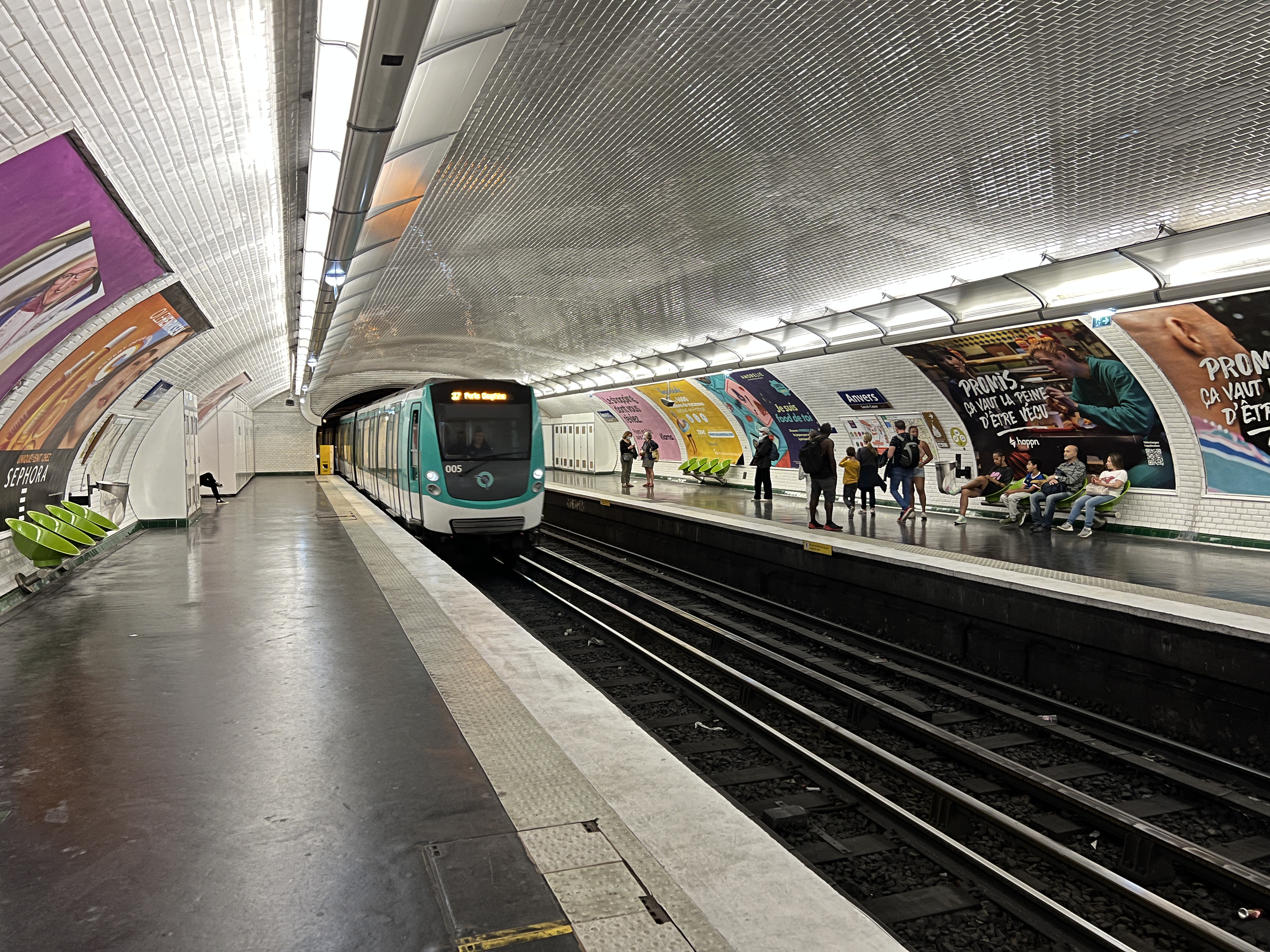
- Anvers platforms in 2022

General information
- Location: 68, Boulevard de Rochechouart; 9th arrondissement of Paris; Île-de-France; France
- Coordinates: 48°52′59″N 2°20′41″E
- Owner: RATP
- Operator: RATP

Other information
- Fare zone: 1

History
- Opened: 7 October 1902

Services
Preceding station	Paris Metro	Following station
Pigalle towards Porte Dauphine	Line 2	Barbès–Rochechouart towards Nation
Location
- Location within Paris

Anvers (French pronunciation: [ɑ̃vɛʁs]) is a station on Line 2 of the Paris Metro. It is located in Montmartre, on the border of the 9th and the 18th arrondissements.

== Location ==
The station is located under Boulevard Marguerite-de-Rochechouart, at Place d'Anvers. Oriented approximately along an east–west axis, it is located between Pigalle and Barbès–Rochechouart metro stations. In the direction of Nation, it is the last underground station preceding the above ground section of the line.

== History ==
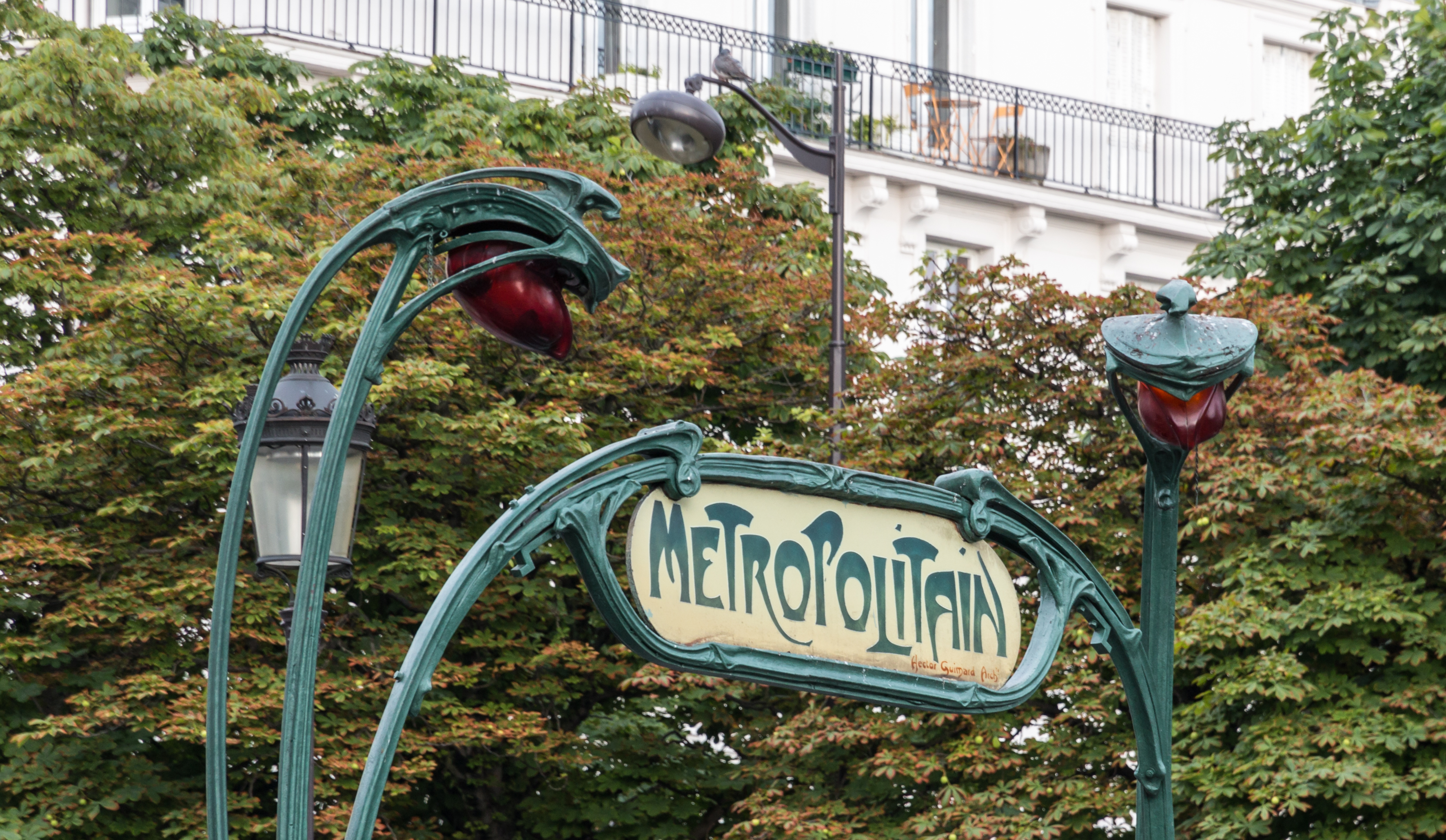
Entrance sign

The station was opened on 21 October 1902 as part of the extension of Line 2 from Étoile (now Charles de Gaulle–Étoile). It was the eastern terminus of the line until its extension to Bagnolet (now called Alexandre Dumas) on 31 January 1903. The station is named after the Place d'Anvers and the Belgian city of Antwerp (Anvers in French) where French troops won a victory over the Dutch during the siege of the citadel of Antwerp in 1832.

The station is located under the Boulevard de Rochechouart, which was built on the route of the Wall of the Farmers-General in order to enforce the collection of taxation between 1784 and 1791 but demolished in the 19th century. Anvers (Sacré-Cœur) is only station on Line 2 between the Charles de Gaulle—Étoile and the Nation stations that is not built on the site of a gate (or barrière in French) of the wall, which became important intersections and thus, logical places for stations. Instead, Anvers station was placed as close to the foot of the Montmartre Funicular as possible. Nevertheless, the Barrière de Rochechouart was at the east, near the junction of the Boulevard de Rochechouart and the Rue de Rochechouart. Also near are the hill of Montmartre and the Basilica of the Sacré-Cœur.

From the 1950s to the end of the 2000s, the side walls were covered with metal bodywork with blue horizontal uprights and illuminated golden advertising frames. Before the bodyworks removal as part of the RATP's Renouveau du métro renovation, it was supplemented with shell yellow seats characteristic of the Motte style. The platform modernization work was completed in 2010.

On 1 April 2016, half of the nameplates on the station's platforms were replaced by the RATP to make an April Fool joke for a day, as in twelve other stations. They use the name of the station (without its subtitle), but are humorously turned upside down in order to play on the homophony between Anvers and envers (reverse).

In 2019, 5,643,147 travelers entered this station which placed it at the 67th position of the metro stations for its usage.

== Passenger services ==
=== Access ===
The station has a single access entitled Boulevard de Rochechouart - Sacré-Coeur, leading to the central reservation of this boulevard, on Place d'Anvers opposite the similarly named square. Consisting of a fixed staircase, it is adorned with a Guimard entrance, the elements of which were designed by Hector Guimard in 1900 was listed as historic monuments by the decree of 29 May 1978.

=== Station layout ===
G Street Level
M	Mezzanine for platform connection
P Platform level	Side platform, doors will open on the right
P Platform level	Platform 1	← toward Porte Dauphine (Pigalle)
P Platform level	Platform 2	toward Nation (Barbès–Rochechouart) →
P Platform level	Side platform, doors will open on the right

=== Platforms ===
Anvers is a standard configuration station. It has two platforms separated by the metro tracks and the vault is elliptical. The decoration is of the style used for most metro stations. The lighting canopies are white and rounded in the Gaudin style of the renouveau du métro des années 2000, and the bevelled white ceramic tiles cover the walls, the vault, the tunnel exits and the outlets of the corridors. The advertising frames are in white ceramic and the name of the station is written in the Parisine font on enamelled plates. The seats are a green Akiko style.

=== Bus services ===
The station is served by lines 54 and the tourist line Tootbus Paris of the RATP bus network and, at night, by lines N01 and N02 of the Noctilien network.

The Montmartre Funicular is accessible a few hundred meters away by taking the Rue de Steinkerque.

== Nearby ==
- Marché de brocante sur le boulevard de Rochechouart
- Butte Montmartre
- Sacré-Cœur, Paris
- Le Trianon (theatre)
