= Le Peletier station =

Metro station in Paris, France

Le Peletier
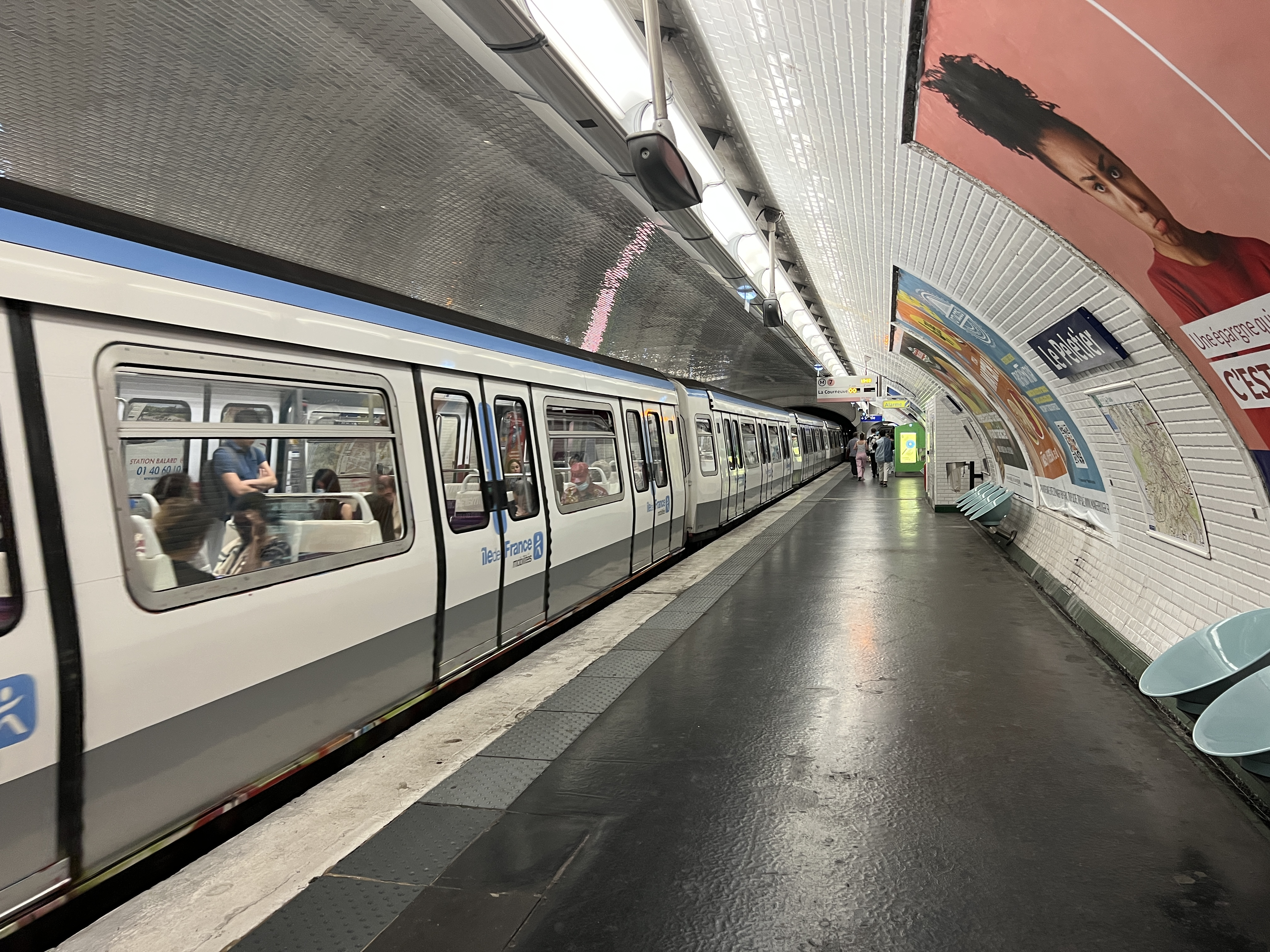
- Station platforms

General information
- Location: 9th arrondissement of Paris; Île-de-France; France
- Coordinates: 48°52′29″N 2°20′22″E
- System: Paris Métro station
- Owner: RATP
- Operator: RATP

Other information
- Fare zone: 1

History
- Opened: 5 November 1910; 115 years ago

Services
Preceding station	Paris Metro	Following station
Chaussée d'Antin–La Fayette towards Villejuif–Louis Aragon or Mairie d'Ivry	Line 7	Cadet towards La Courneuve–8 mai 1945
Location
- Location within Paris

Le Peletier (French pronunciation: [lə pɛltje]) is a station on Line 7 of the Paris Métro. Located in the 9th arrondissement, it was belatedly opened on June 6, 1911, seven months after the inauguration of Line 7. It is named after the nearby Rue le Peletier, which was named after Louis Peletier, who was the last but one Prévôt des marchands de Paris (provost of the merchants of Paris) between 1784 and 1789. This feudal position was abolished in the French Revolution.

The Opéra National de Paris was located in the Salle Le Peletier, on Rue le Peletier, between 1821 and 1873, when it was destroyed by fire. It was the first theatre to use gas lighting to illuminate the stage. The station is located a short walk from Notre-Dame-de-Lorette station on Line 12, but no free transfer is permitted.

== Station layout ==
Street Level

B1	Connecting level

Line 7 platforms	Side platform, doors will open on the right
Line 7 platforms	Southbound	← toward Villejuif–Louis Aragon or Mairie d'Ivry (Chaussée d'Antin–La Fayette)
Line 7 platforms	Northbound	toward La Courneuve–8 mai 1945 (Cadet) →
Line 7 platforms	Side platform, doors will open on the right

== Gallery ==
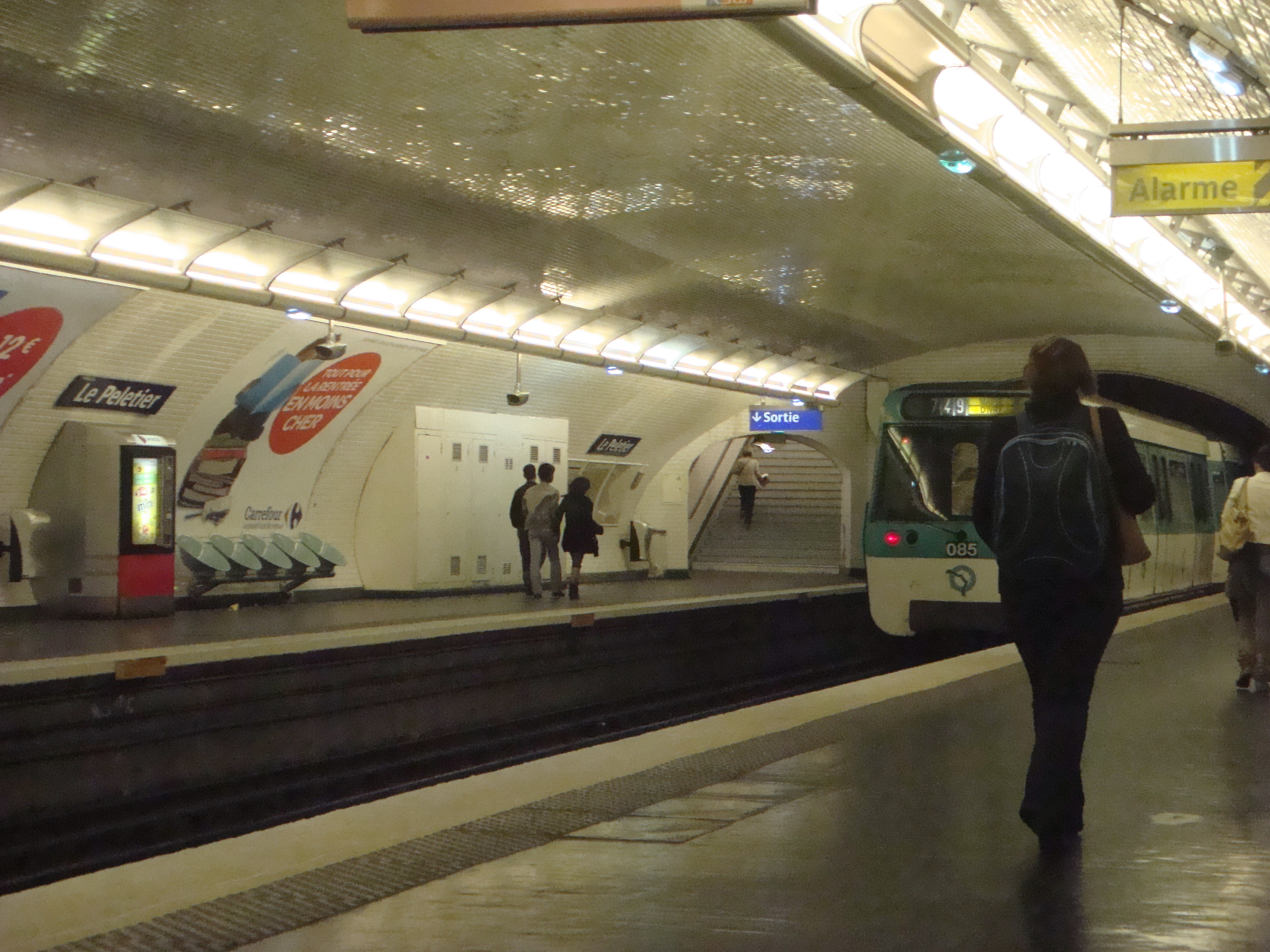
MF 77 rolling stock at Le Peletier

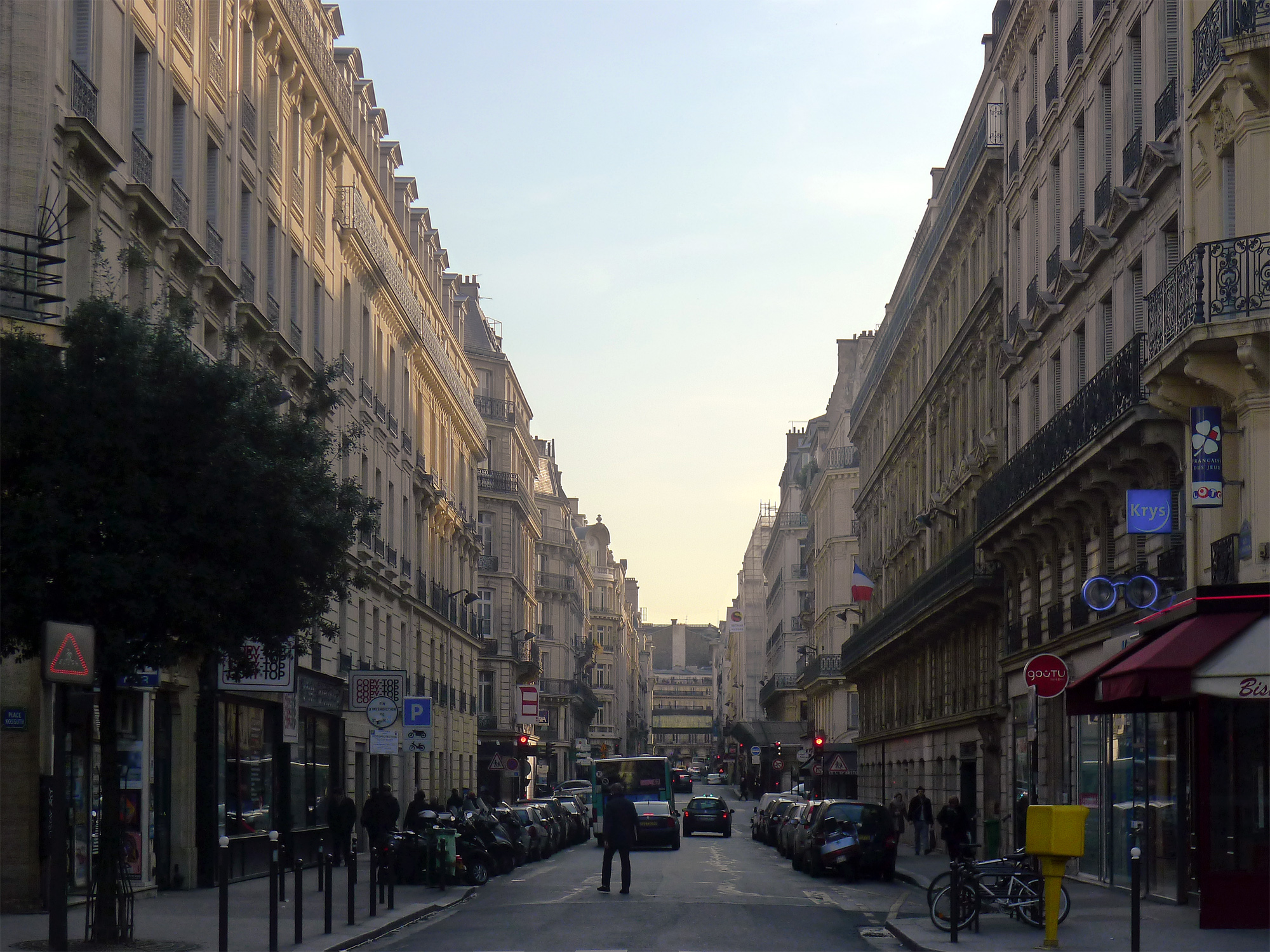
The Rue Le Peletier
