= I'm Off =

1999 novel by Jean Echenoz

- 1999 hardback edition
- Author: Jean Echenoz
- Original title: Je m'en vais
- Language: French
- Publisher: Les Éditions de Minuit
- Publication date: 7 September 1999
- Publication place: France
- Pages: 252
- ISBN: 2-7073-1686-5

I'm Off (French: Je m'en vais) is a 1999 novel by the French writer Jean Echenoz. It is also known as I'm Gone. It received the Prix Goncourt.

== See also ==
- 1999 in literature
- Contemporary French literature
