= We Three (band) =

American pop band

We Three is an American pop band from McMinnville, Oregon, composed of siblings Manny Humlie, Bethany Blanchard, and Joshua Humlie. The group gained national attention in 2018 when they reached the semifinals of the thirteenth season of America's Got Talent. We Three released their self-titled debut studio album in 2018. Their latest album, She Left for America was released in 2026.

== Early years ==
The three siblings grew up in McMinnville in a musical family. Their father founded a local music school, where the siblings later worked as music teachers. Bethany and Joshua initially performed covers with other musicians before playing as a duo; Manny later joined them, and they performed for a period as the Humlie Trio. Before their television appearance, the group performed regionally and released independent EPs including Neverland (2016) and Celebrate the Struggle, Pt. 1 (2017).

=== America's Got Talent and debut album ===
In 2018, We Three appeared on season 13 of America's Got Talent. For their audition, the group performed their original song "Heaven's Not Too Far", which was inspired by the death of their mother. Their performance received a standing ovation from the judges. The band continued to perform their original songs throughout the competition and reached the semifinals before being eliminated.

Following the show, the sibling's left their music-teaching jobs to focus on the band full-time and prepared a headline tour. Their self-titled debut studio album was released on December 14, 2018. In 2019, the band released their five-song EP We're All Messed Up - But It's Ok.

=== Dear Paranoia, Sincerely, Me and Happy ===
The band's second studio album, Dear Paranoia, Sincerely, Me, was released on May 1, 2020. In a review of the album, Pop Culturalist called the trio "creative", "innovative", and "technically on point". In an interview with American Songwriter, Manny Humlie said that he had become the band's primary songwriter, with the songs then developed by the group. The band's planned European tour to support the album was disrupted by the COVID-19 pandemic; during the pandemic, the group expanded its audience through social media and continued writing and recording.

We Three released their third studio album, Happy, on May 27, 2022. Later that year, the band undertook its first UK and European tour.

=== Love Me and later releases ===
The band's fourth studio album, Love Me, was released on July 21, 2023. They toured the album later that year. A concert recording, Love Me (Live), followed in December 2024.

On March 13, 2026, We Three released their fifth studio album, She Left for America. German music publication minutenmusik called the album "magnificent".

== Musical style and themes ==
AllMusic classifies We Three within pop/rock, with styles including pop, adult alternative pop/rock, indie pop and alternative/indie rock. The Line of Best Fit described the group's music as melodic pop-rock and noted its use of direct songwriting about sensitive subjects. The band's songs have addressed grief, mental health, self-harm, relationships and religion.

== Members ==
- Manny Humlie – vocals, guitar. He also plays trumpet and piano.
- Bethany Blanchard – electric bass, vocals. She was the first of the sibling's to play piano and is also trained in double bass.
- Joshua Humlie – drums, keyboards, vocals

== Discography ==
=== Studio albums ===
- We Three (2018)
- Dear Paranoia, Sincerely, Me (2020)
- Happy (2022)
- Love Me (2023)
- She Left for America (2026)

=== Extended plays ===
- Neverland (2016)
- Celebrate the Struggle, Pt. 1 (2017)
- We're All Messed Up - But It's Ok (2019)

=== Live albums ===
- Love Me (Live) (2024)
