= Jean Echenoz =

French writer (born 1947)

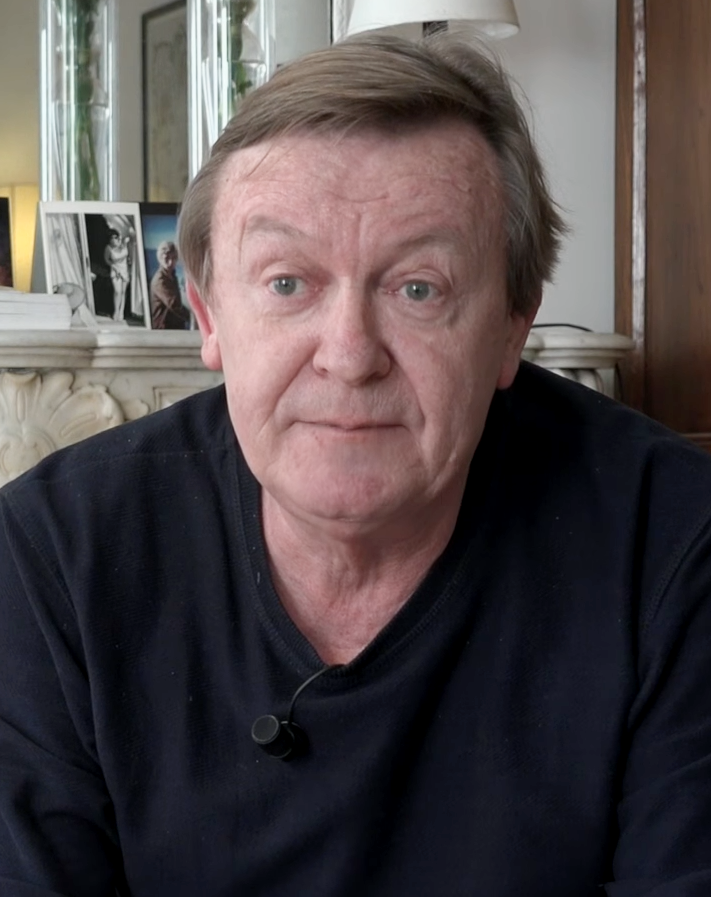
- Jean Echenoz in 2016
- Born: 26 December 1947 (age 78); Orange, Vaucluse, France
- Occupation: Writer
- Known for: I'm Off; 1914

Jean Echenoz (French pronunciation: [ʒɑ̃ ɛʃ(ə)noz]; born 26 December 1947) is a French writer.

== Biography ==
Jean Echenoz was born in Orange, Vaucluse, the son of a psychiatrist, He studied in Rodez, Digne-les-Bains, Lyon, Aix-en-Provence, Marseille and Paris, where he has lived since 1970. He published his first book, Le Méridien de Greenwich in 1979, for which he received the Fénéon Prize in 1980. He has published twelve novels to date and received about ten literary prizes, including the Prix Médicis 1983 for Cherokee, the Prix Goncourt 1999 for I'm Gone (Je m'en vais), and the Aristeion Prize for Chopin's Move (Lac) (1989).

== Works ==
=== Novels and narratives (récits) ===
- Le Méridien de Greenwich (Minuit, 1979)
- Cherokee (Minuit, 1983) (Godine, 1987; reprinted, University of Nebraska Press, 1994)
- L'Équipée malaise (Minuit, 1986) Double Jeopardy (Godine, 1993; reprinted, University of Nebraska Press, 1994)
- L'Occupation des sols (Minuit, 1988) Plan of Occupancy (Alyscamps Press, 1995)
- Lac (Minuit, 1989) translated as Chopin's Move (Dalkey Archive, 2004)
- Nous trois (Minuit, 1992) We Three (Dalkey Archive, 2017)
- Les Grandes Blondes (Minuit, 1995) Big Blondes (The New Press, 1997)
- Un an (Minuit, 1997)
- Je m'en vais (Minuit, 1999) US: I'm Gone (The New Press, 2001); UK: I'm Off (Harvill, 2001)
- Jérôme Lindon (Minuit, 2001)
- Au piano (Minuit, 2003) Piano (The New Press, 2004)
- Ravel (Minuit, 2006) (The New Press, 2007)
- Courir (Minuit, 2008) Running (The New Press, 2009)
- Des éclairs (Minuit, 2010) Lightning (The New Press, 2011)
- 14 (Minuit, 2012) 1914 (The New Press, 2014)
- Caprice de la reine (Minuit, 2014) The Queen's Caprice (The New Press, 2015)
- Envoyée spéciale (Minuit, 2016) Special Envoy (The New Press, 2017)
- Vie de Gérard Fulmard (Minuit, 2020) Command Performance (New York Review Books, 2024)
- Bristol (Minuit, 2025) (New York Review Books, 2027)

=== Other publications ===
- "Ayez des amis", p. 49-70 in "New Smyrna Beach, Semaines de Suzanne" (Minuit, 1991)
- "J'arrive" in Le serpent à plumes, no. 3, 1992
- Les Éclairs (opera, adapted from Des éclairs), Minuit, 2021 (ISBN 9782707347374)
