= We Three (novel) =

Novel

- First US edition
- Author: Jean Echenoz
- Original title: Nous trois
- Translator: Jesse Anderson
- Cover artist: Eric Longfellow (US first edition)
- Language: French
- Genre: Novel
- Publisher: Les Éditions de Minuit (France); Dalkey Archive Press (US)
- Publication date: August 1992
- Publication place: France
- English publication date: 1 February 2017
- ISBN: 978-1-62897-170-5 US first edition, paperback

We Three (French: Nous trois) is a 1992 novel by French author Jean Echenoz. It was published in English in 2017 in a translation by Jesse Anderson.

== Plot summary ==
At an indeterminate date, the narrator, DeMilo, a womanizing astronaut, returns to his home in Paris where he lives alone with his pet Titov. He has known a woman named Lucie for years who, despite repeated advances on his part, remains only a friend. Louis Meyer, a graduate of the École Polytechnique, is a specialist in spacecraft ceramic engines who works for the same space agency as DeMilo. He has been divorced for two years, and still suffers from his wife Victoria's absence, but nonetheless has regular sexual encounters with women. Despite the imminence of a new launch project, Meyer manages to get a week's vacation from Blondel, his boss. On his way to Marseille to spend a few days with an old friend, he stops to help a mysterious, preternaturally calm young woman whose Mercedes catches fire and ends up exploding. He drives her to Marseille, where he drops her off at a taxi stand, but she barely exchanges a word or a glance with him.

After getting lost in the outskirts of the city, where he observes farm animals behaving in a strangely disturbed manner, Meyer arrives at his friend Nicole's villa. At a party he hesitates between two women as potential sexual partners, opts for Marion and spends the night with her. The next day he goes shopping in the city. He again encounters the woman he drove to Marseille, whom he thinks of as "Mercedes" because he does not know her name, in an elevator at a shopping mall. At the same time a powerful earthquake devastates Marseille. Meyer manages to get out of the elevator and pulls "Mercedes" by the wrist; fleeing the proximity of the sea, they go back to the Saint-Barnabé district. In order to return to Paris, they manage to buy a car, despite the prevailing confusion. During a stop for the night in Eyzin-Pinet, Meyer still can barely manage to elicit a word or a smile from "Mercedes", who both annoys and attracts him. The two survivors arrive in Paris, where they separate on the sidewalk of the rue Cortambert, still without any meaningful exchange.

Upset and incredulous at the situation, Meyer recovers from the recent events. Blondel summons Meyer to his office, where he announces that, following the Marseille earthquake, the government has released emergency funds to place Sismo, a seismic monitoring satellite, into orbit. Blondel is short one crewmember for the satellite launch mission; Meyer had, about twenty years earlier, signed up for and begun astronaut training, but has long set that dream aside. With some difficulty, Blondel convinces him to fly aboard a secondhand American Space Shuttle loaned for the occasion.

Meyer trains at a space center in France along with Bégonhès, the flight commander, and a civilian passenger, a member of parliament named Molino. DeMilo, the pilot for the mission, and Dr. Lucie Blanche, a biologist, are already training at the Guiana Space Centre. When the crew assembles in French Guiana, Meyer is stunned to discover that Dr. Blanche is "Mercedes". DeMilo is enthusiastic about spending time with Lucie, who has told him she has broken up with her boyfriend. The young woman shows an additional degree of coldness, which does not help Meyer's state of nervousness. After several days, when Meyer and Lucie are alone together after she conducts his pre-flight medical examination, she shows emotion for the first time and collapses in his arms. Lucie was in Marseille for a secret meeting with a lover who died in the disaster. In Paris she broke up with her boyfriend before embarking for the mission. During the six days in orbit at an altitude of 300 kilometres (190 mi), everything goes as planned: satellites are successfully launched and repaired while DeMilo monitors the relationship of Meyer and Lucie, who conduct their scientific experiments; Molino spends the trip vomiting. Meyer and Lucie make love in weightlessness the night before the shuttle lands. Back in Paris Lucie moves into Meyer's apartment, but the relationship quickly loses its first bloom. On a Saturday when Meyer has to stay late at work, Lucie calls DeMilo and arranges to meet him at a bar. During that afternoon, DeMilo's placid pet Titov shows obvious signs of panic, and a blood-like rain begins to fall.

== Reception ==
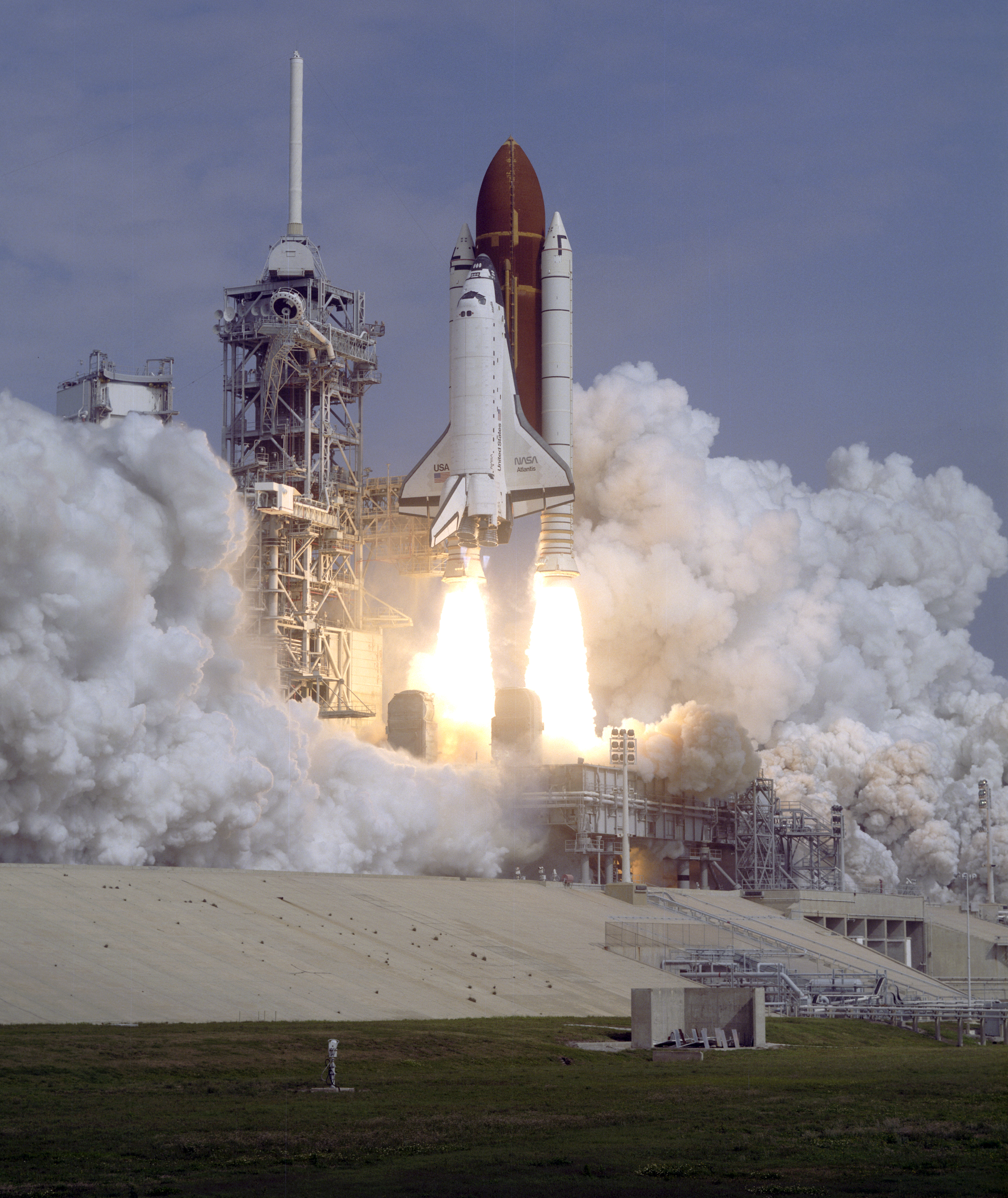
Launch of a Space Shuttle

Pierre Lepape — always enthusiastic about the novels of Jean Echenoz — wrote in Le Monde that with Nous trois the novelist once again showed "his talent as a virtuoso of the language, a gifted slalomer of conjugation, a juggler and little clown of grammar" to produce a complex work that is not just a mere "divertissement" of reading, as it might seem at first glance. Olivier Barrot considered the novel the most unusual of the 1992 literary year and the "most entertaining story" of the latter months of the year.

Reviewing the English translation, Publishers Weekly said, "Echenoz constructs a tight narrative in a constant state of flux. This fluidity mirrors the uncertainty of the protagonists and narrator, who all demonstrate a sense of rootless yearning. This novel welcomes repeated readings and presents new aspects to admire each time."

== Editions ==
- Les Éditions de Minuit, 1992 (reprinted 1995), ISBN 9782707314284.
- Dalkey Archive Press, 2017, ISBN 978-1-62897-170-5.
