= Mairie d'Issy station =

Paris Métro station in Issy-les-Moulineaux

Mairie d'Issy
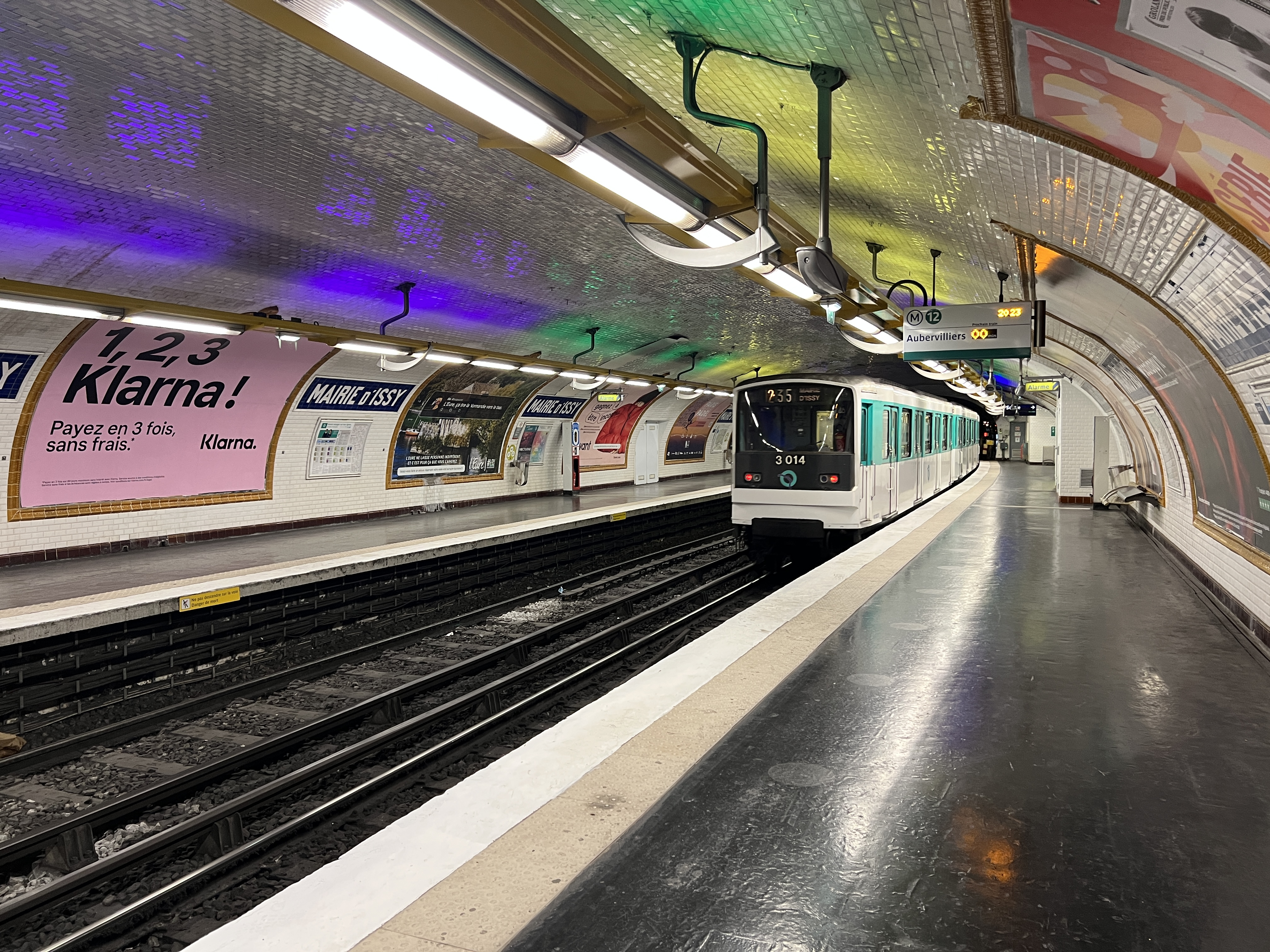
- MF 67 at Mairie d'Issy

General information
- Location: Issy-les-Moulineaux; Île-de-France; France
- Coordinates: 48°49′27″N 2°16′24″E
- System: Paris Métro station
- Owner: RATP
- Operator: RATP
- Line: Paris Metro Paris Metro Line 12
- Platforms: 2 (2 side platforms)
- Tracks: 2

Construction
- Accessible: no

Other information
- Station code: 2803
- Fare zone: 2

History
- Opened: 24 March 1934

Passengers
- 2,874,138 (2021)

Services
Preceding station	Paris Metro	Following station
Terminus	Line 12	Corentin Celton towards Mairie d'Aubervilliers
Location
- Location within Paris

Mairie d'Issy (French pronunciation: [mɛʁi disi]) is the southern terminus of Line 12 of the Paris Métro in the suburban commune of Issy-les-Moulineaux, Hauts-de-Seine. It is named after and located near the local town hall.

Shops located on Avenue Victor Cresson and the Avenue de la République are served by the station.

== History ==
The station opened on 24 March 1934 as part of the extension of the line from Porte de Versailles.

In 2019, the station was used by 4,096,487 passengers, making it the 111st busiest of the Métro network out of 302 stations.

In 2020, the station was used by 2,083,392 passengers amidst the COVID-19 pandemic, making it the 116th busiest of the Métro network out of 304 stations.

In 2021, the station was used by 2,874,138 passengers, making it the 115th busiest of the Métro network out of 304 stations.

== Passenger services ==
=== Access ===
The station has 2 accesses:

- Access 1: aue du Général Leclerc
- Access 2: avenue de la République Mairie (exit-only escalator)

=== Station layout ===
Street Level
B1	Mezzanine
Platform level	Side platform, doors will open on the right
Platform level	Southbound	← Alighting passengers only
Platform level	Northbound	toward Mairie D'Aubervillers (Corentin Celton) →
Platform level	Side platform, doors will open on the right

=== Platforms ===
The station has a standard configuration with 2 tracks surrounded by 2 side platforms. It is one of only two stations on the line to be decorated in the style of the Compagnie du chemin de fer métropolitain de Paris (CMP) instead of the Nord-Sud style used on the other stations, with the other station being Corentin Celton. The Nord-Sud company was absorbed by the CMP in 1930.

=== Other connections ===
The station is also served by lines 123, 169, 190, 290, 323, and TUVIM of the RATP bus network, and at night, by line N13 of the Noctilien bus network.

== Nearby ==
- Musée Français de la Carte à Jouer
- Town hall of Issy-les-Moulineaux

== Gallery ==
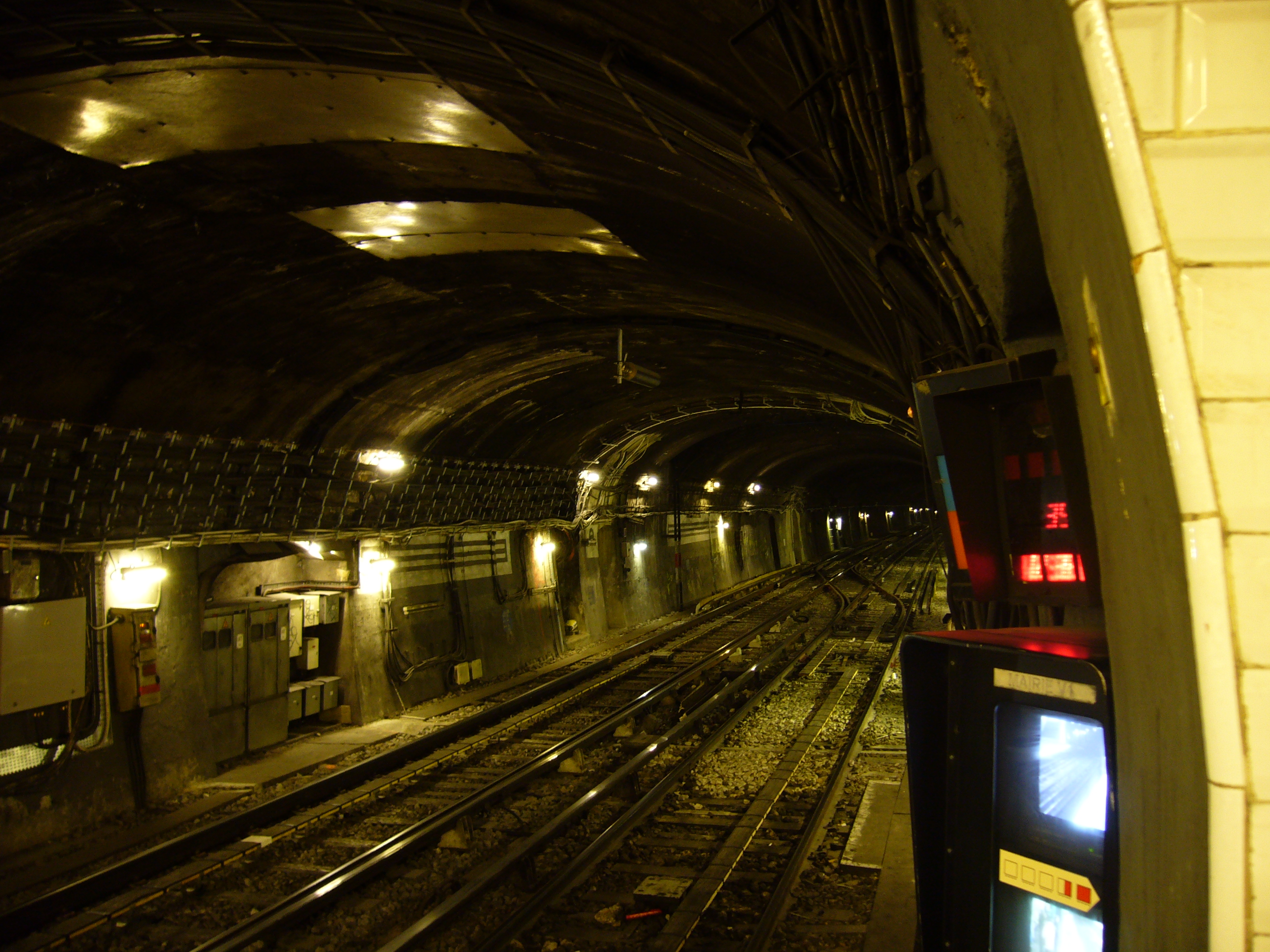
Tracks used to reverse trains south of the station

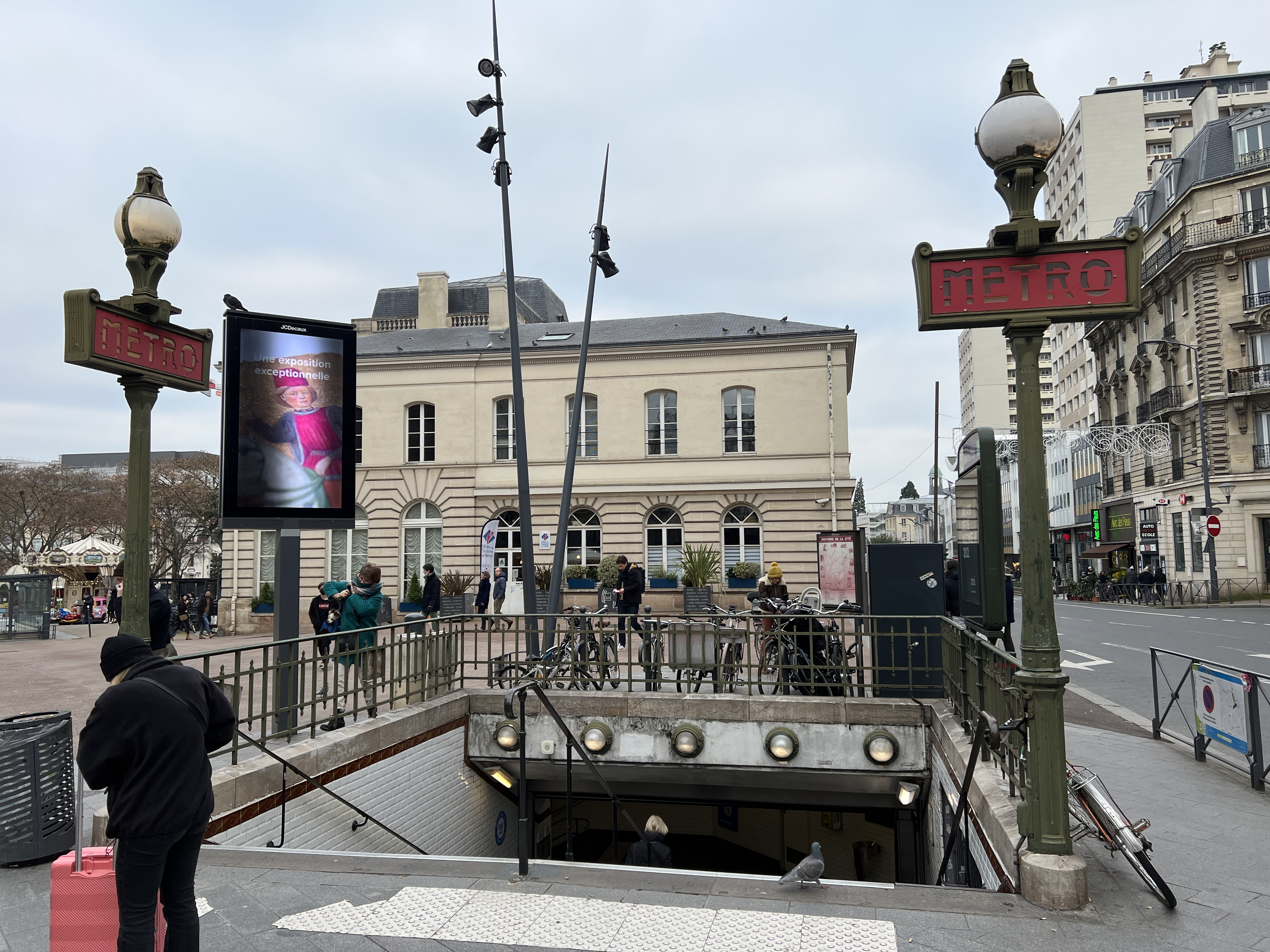
Access 1

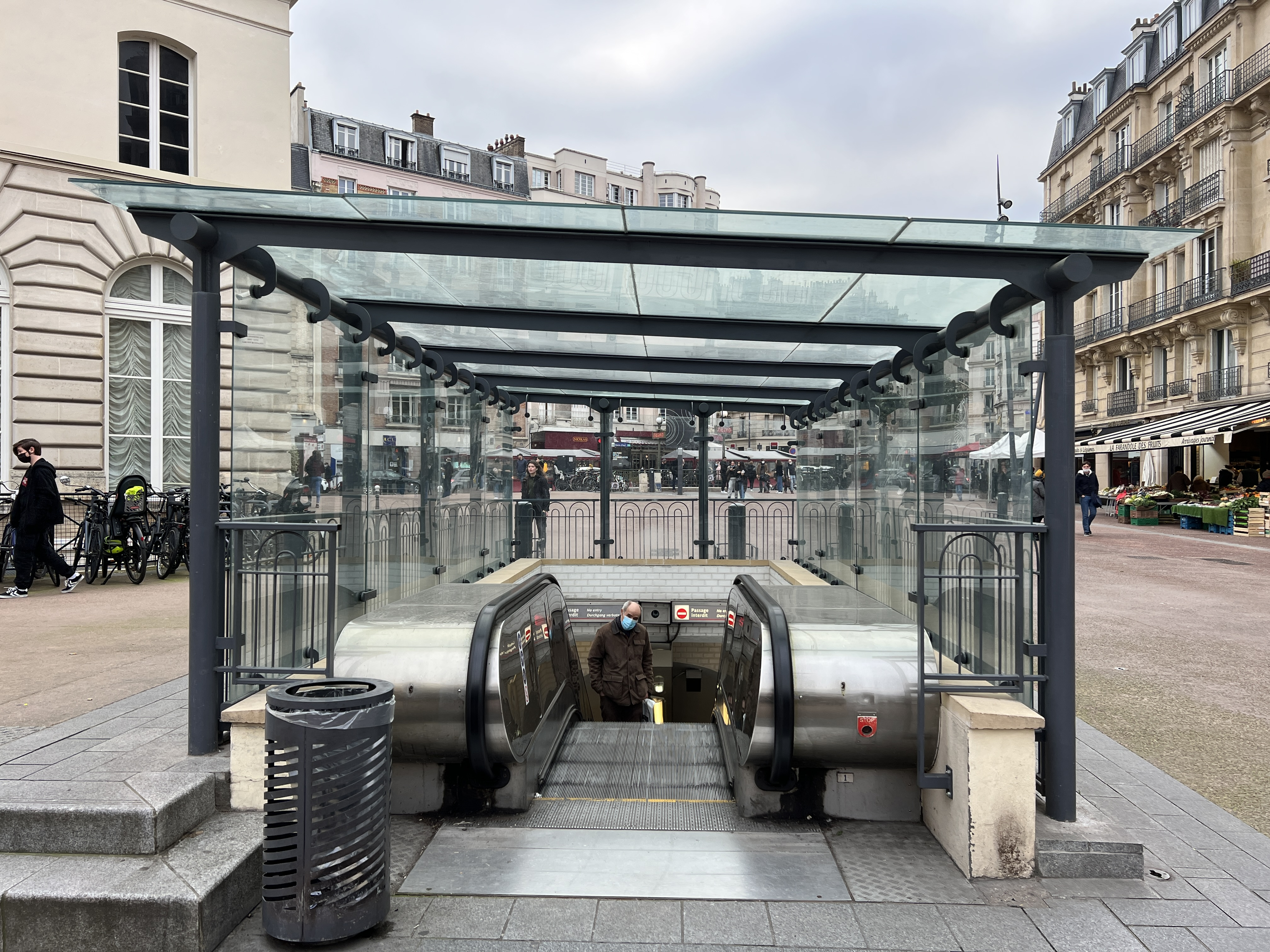
Access 2

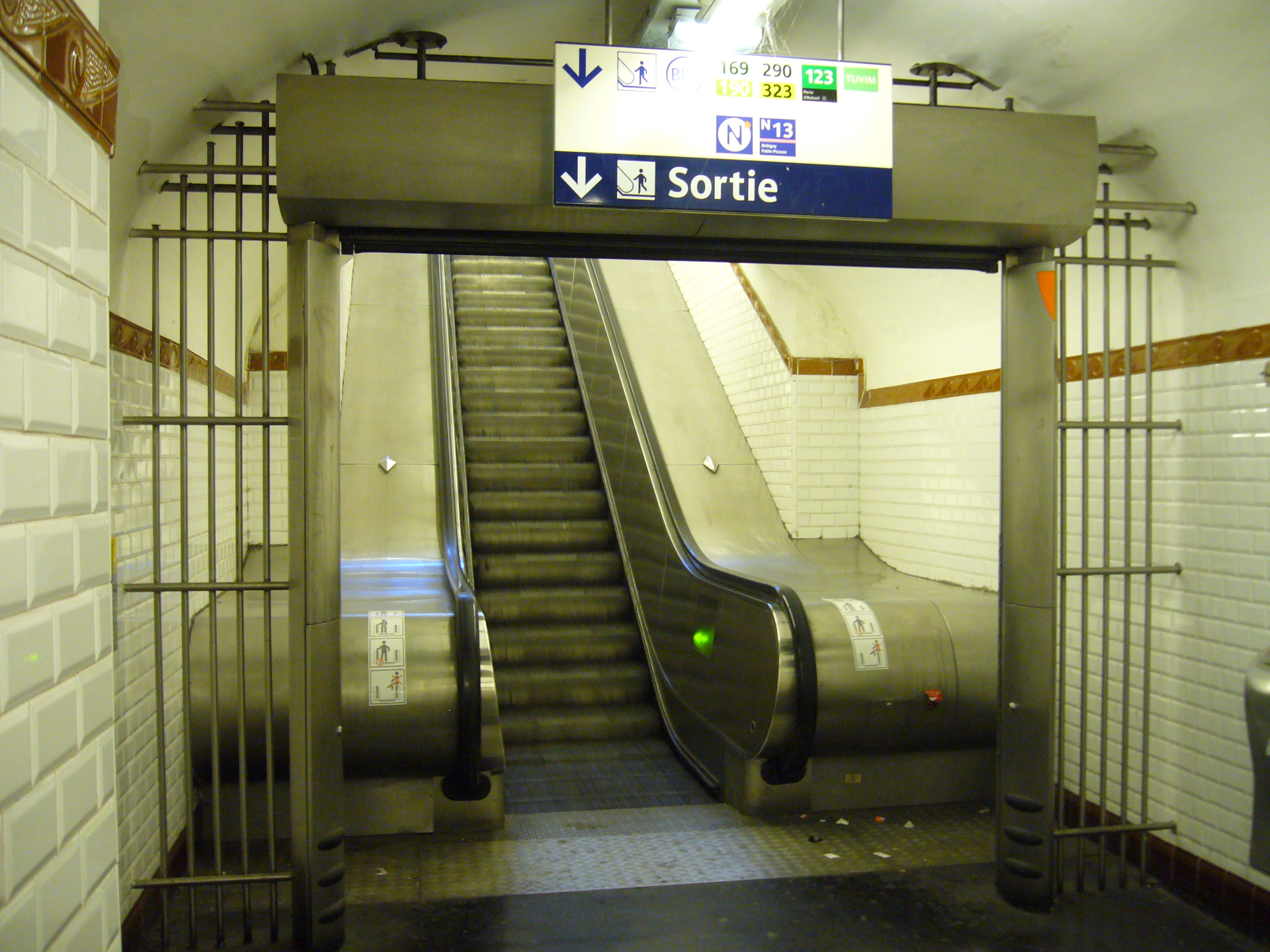
Access 2 from inside the station
