= Greffulhe =

Greffulhe may refer to:

== People ==
- Countess Élisabeth Greffulhe, born Élisabeth de Riquet de Caraman-Chimay (1860-1952), French aristocrat.
- Henri Greffulhe (1815-1879), French politician.
- Count Henry Greffulhe (1848-1932), French aristocrat and politician.
- Count Jean-Henry-Louis Greffulhe (1774-1820), Dutch-born French banker and politician.
- Louis-Charles Greffulhe (1814-1888), French aristocrat and politician.

== Other ==
- Greffuhle Stradivarius, a violin.
- Prix Greffulhe, a horse race in France.
- Rue Greffulhe, a street in Paris, France.
