= Quartier de l'Europe =

Coordinates: 48.87900161743164°N 2.323390007019043°E

Europe
- Quartier de l'Europe
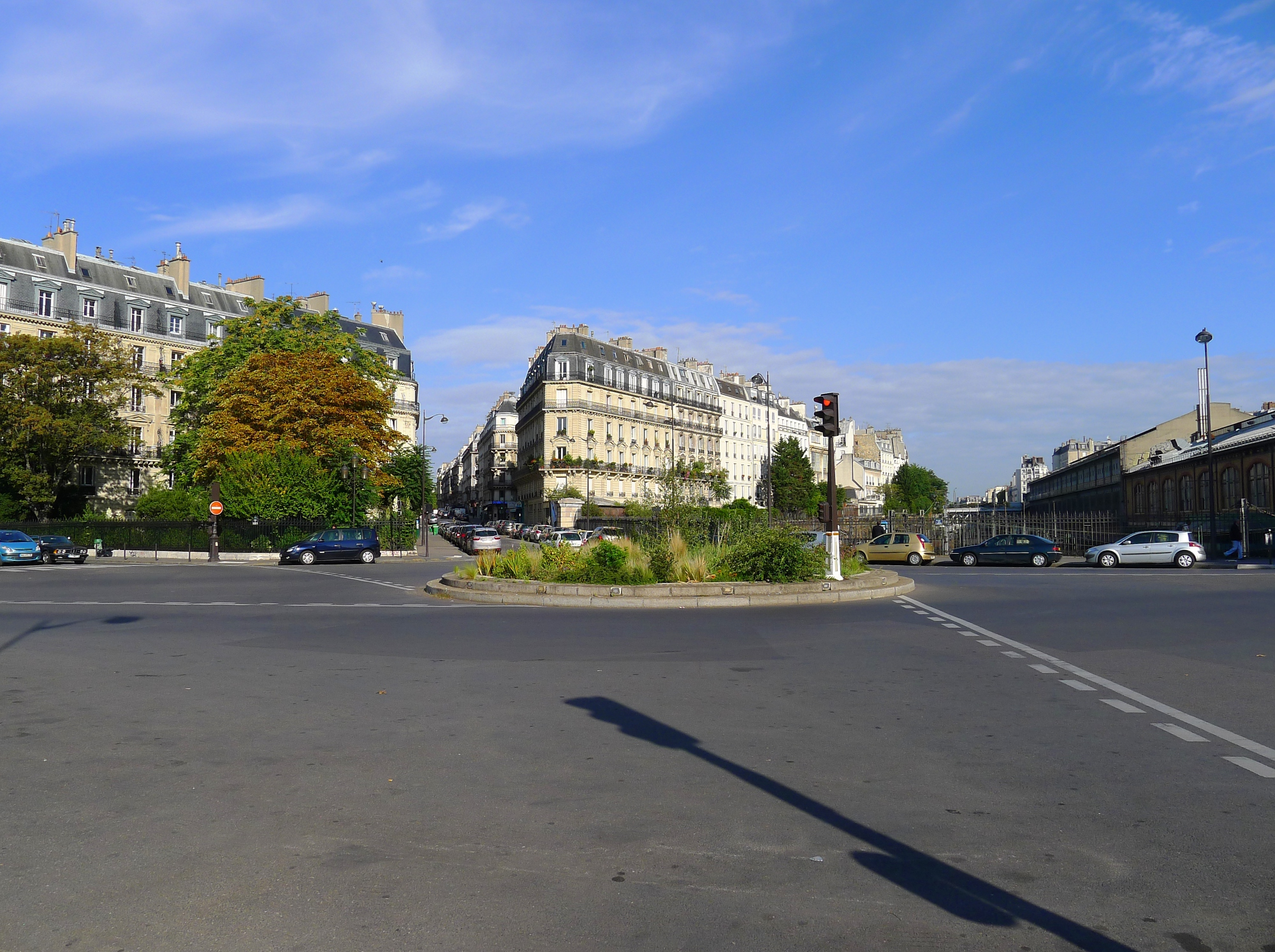
- Place de l'Europe
- Country: France
- Region: Île-de-France
- Ville: Paris
- Arrondissement: 8th

Area
  - Total: 1.183 km^{2} (0.457 sq mi)

Population (2016)
  - Total: 186,111
  - Density: 15,732/km^{2} (40,750/sq mi)

The Quartier de l'Europe is the 32nd administrative district of Paris, located in the 8th arrondissement. The district is named after the Place de l'Europe, since 2018 called Place de l'Europe–Simone Veil.

The 8th arrondissement also consists of the districts of Champs-Élysées, Faubourg-du-Roule and Madeleine.

== Attractions ==
- Saint-André-de-l'Europe
- Saint-Augustin
- Place de l'Europe–Simone Veil
- Parc Monceau
- Square Marcel-Pagnol
- Paris Saint-Lazare

== Pictures ==
The four administrative districts of the 8th arrondissement of Paris.

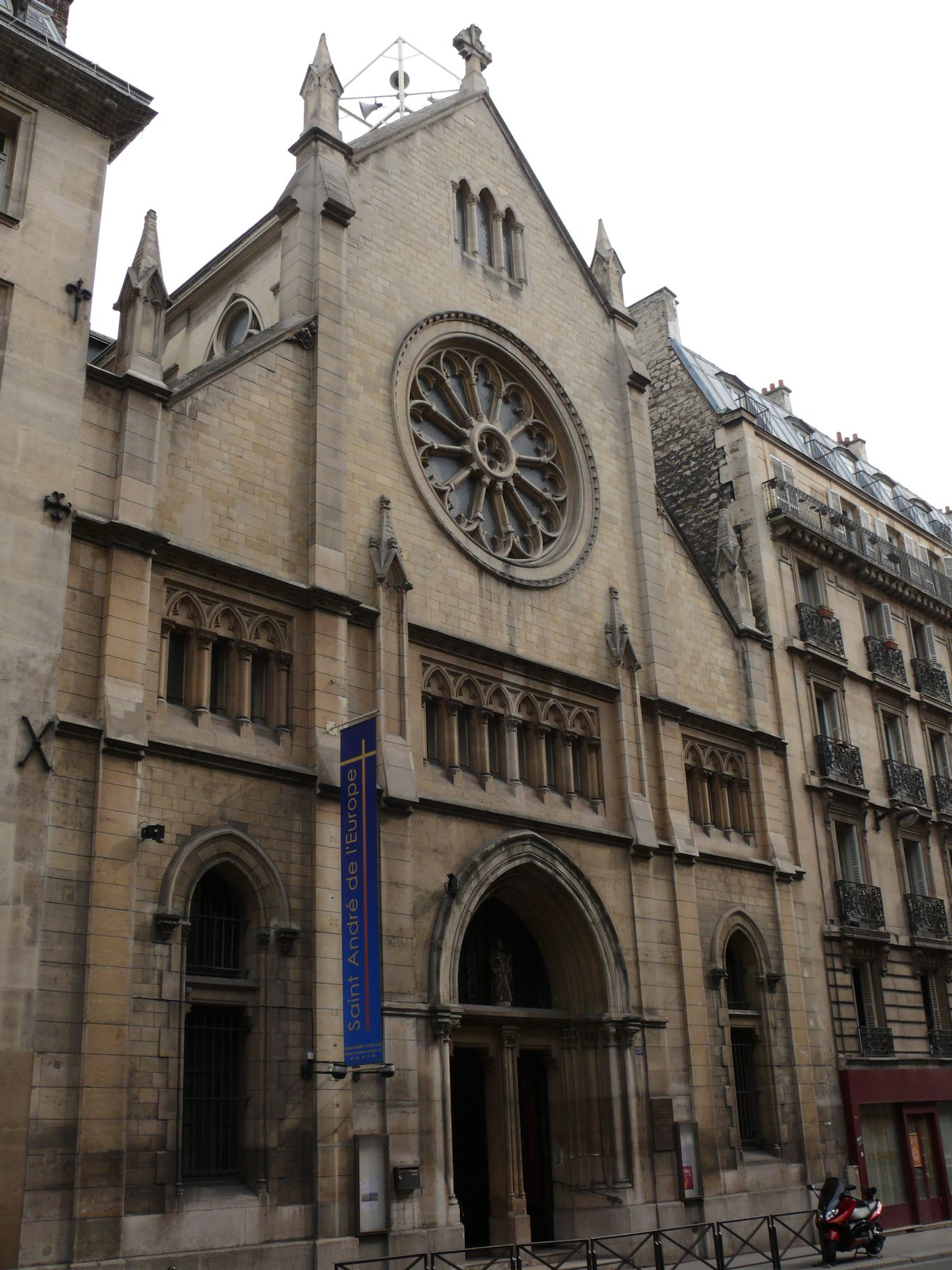
Saint-André-de-l'Europe.

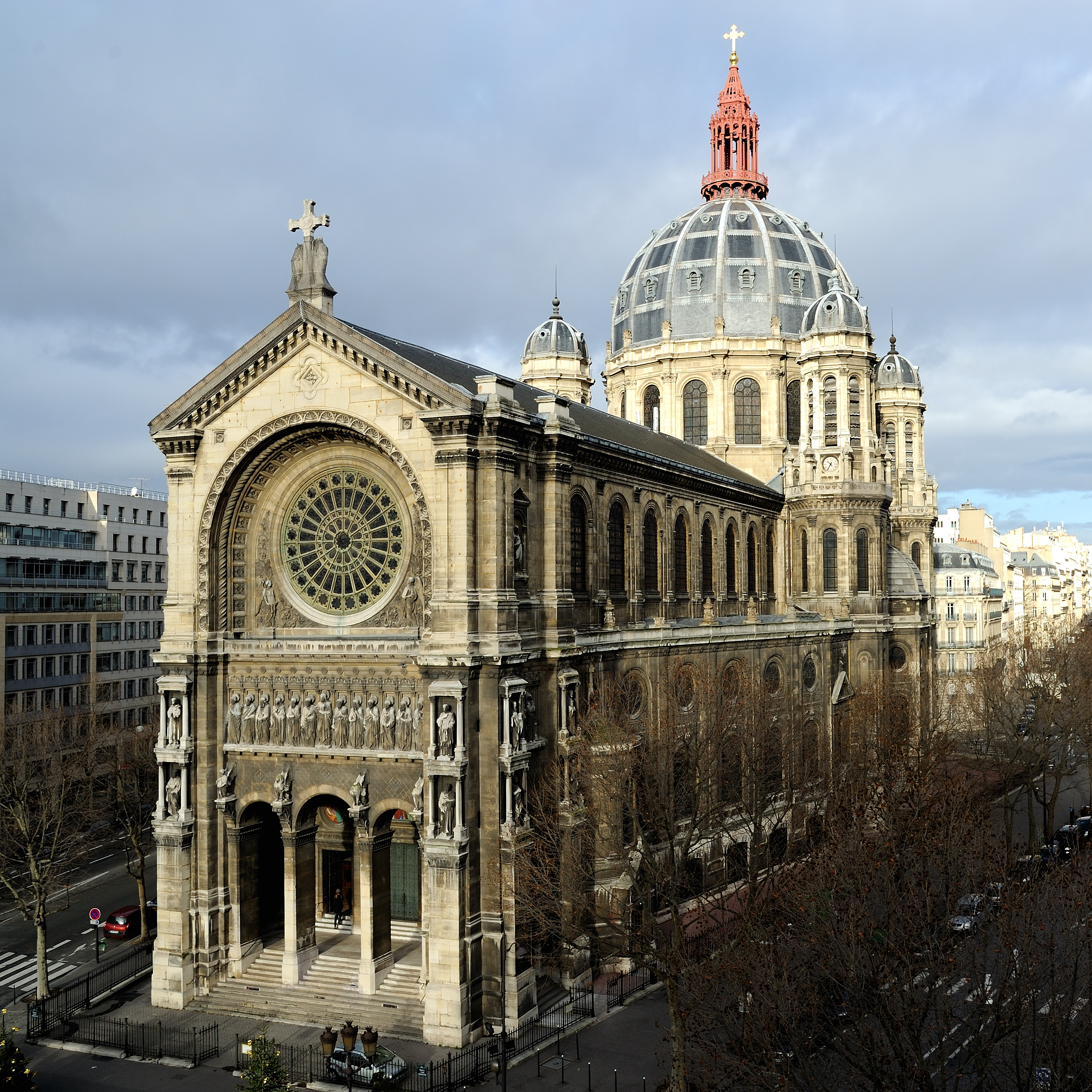
Saint-Augustin.

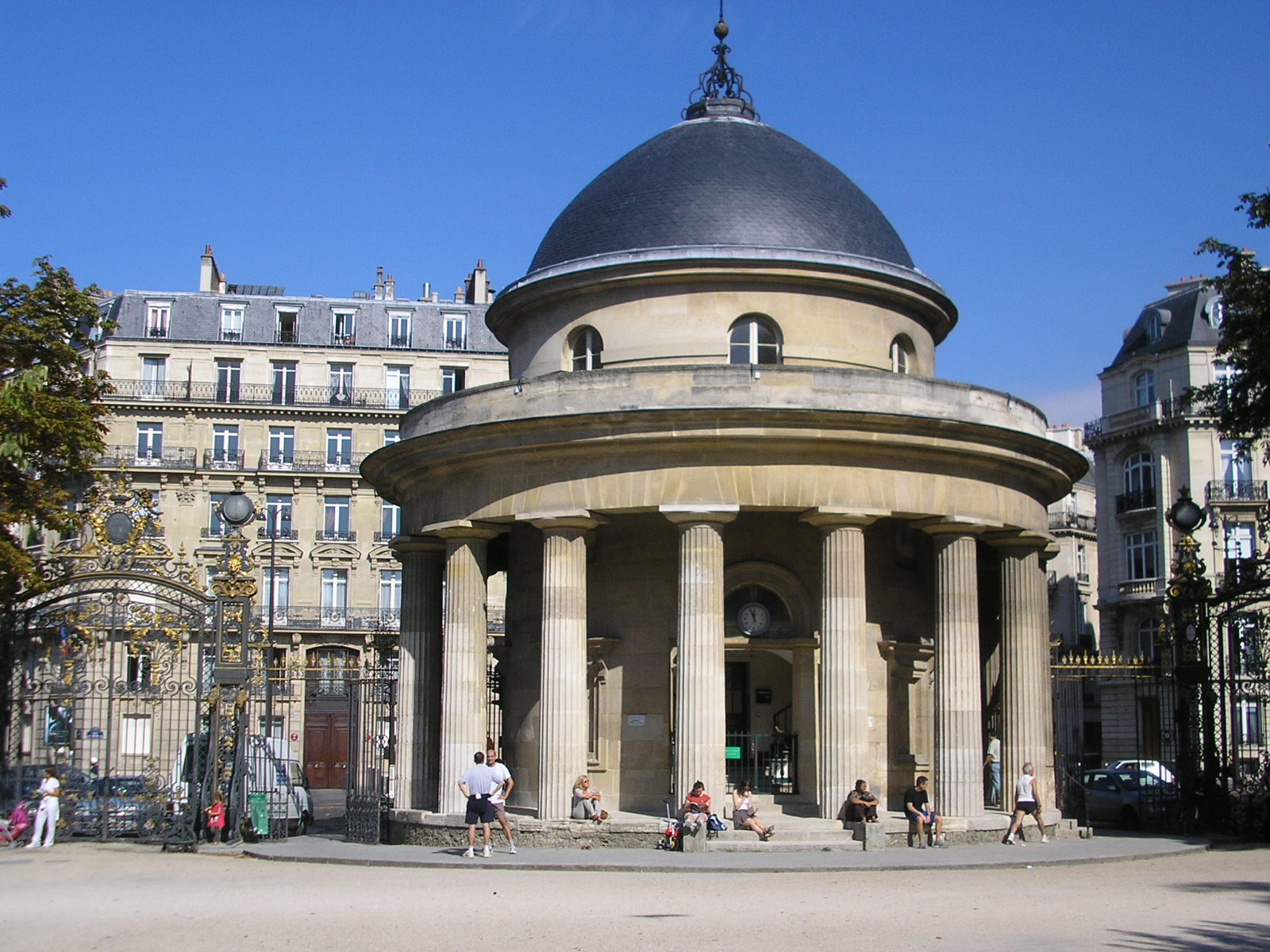
La Rotonde and Parc Monceau.

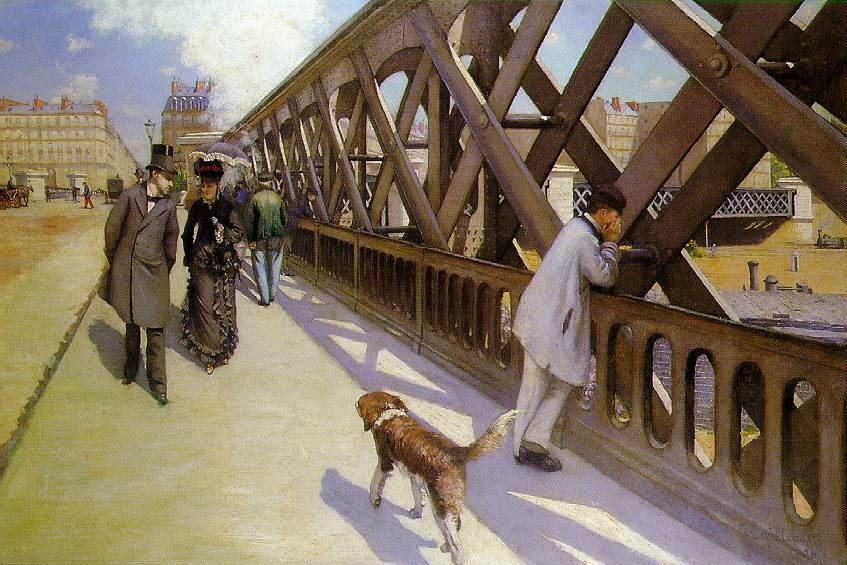
Le Pont de l'Europe, painting by Gustave Caillebotte from 1876.

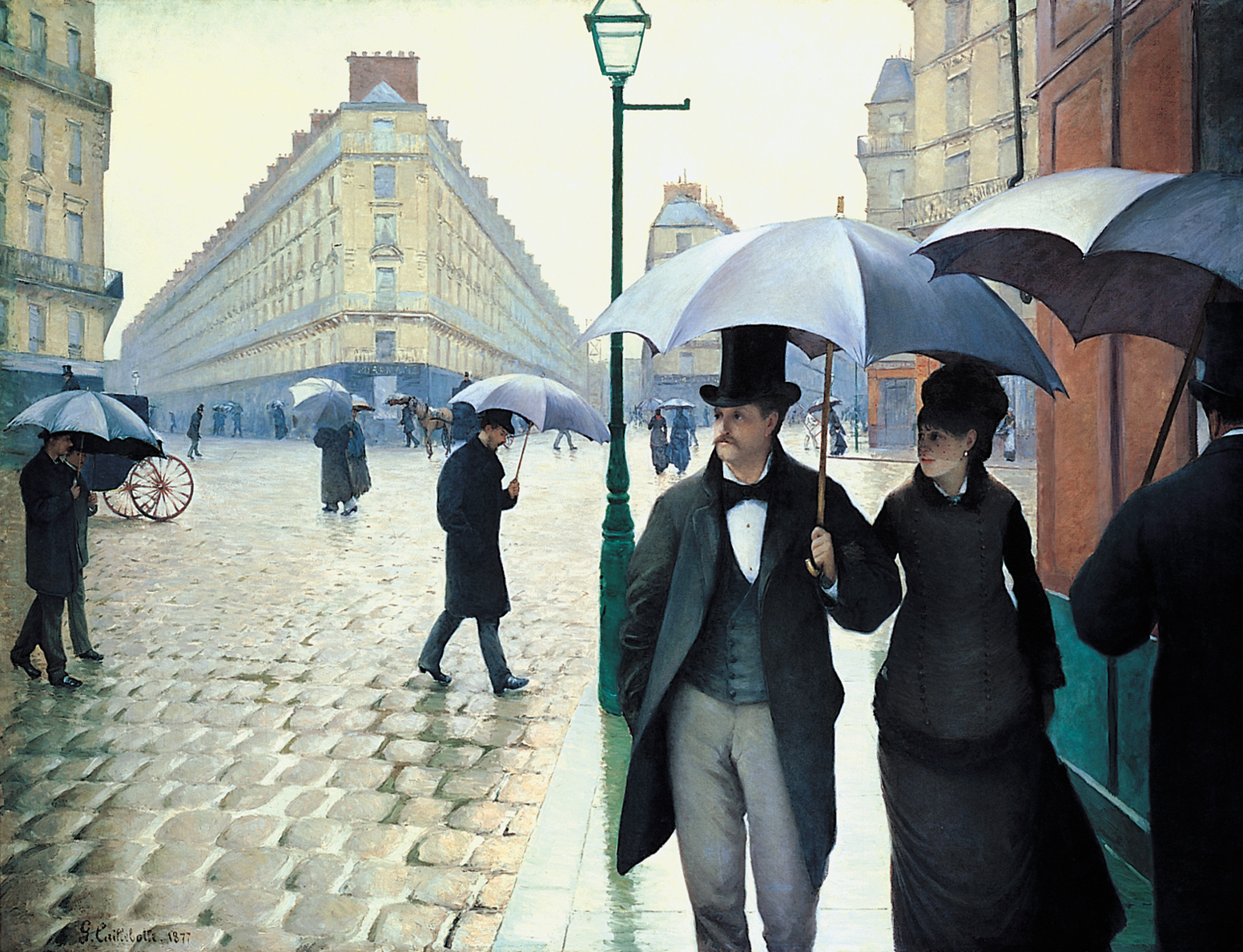
Rue de Paris, temps de pluie, painting by Gustave Caillebotte from 1877.
