= Jardin de l'Hôtel-Salomon-de-Rothschild =

Urban park in Paris, France

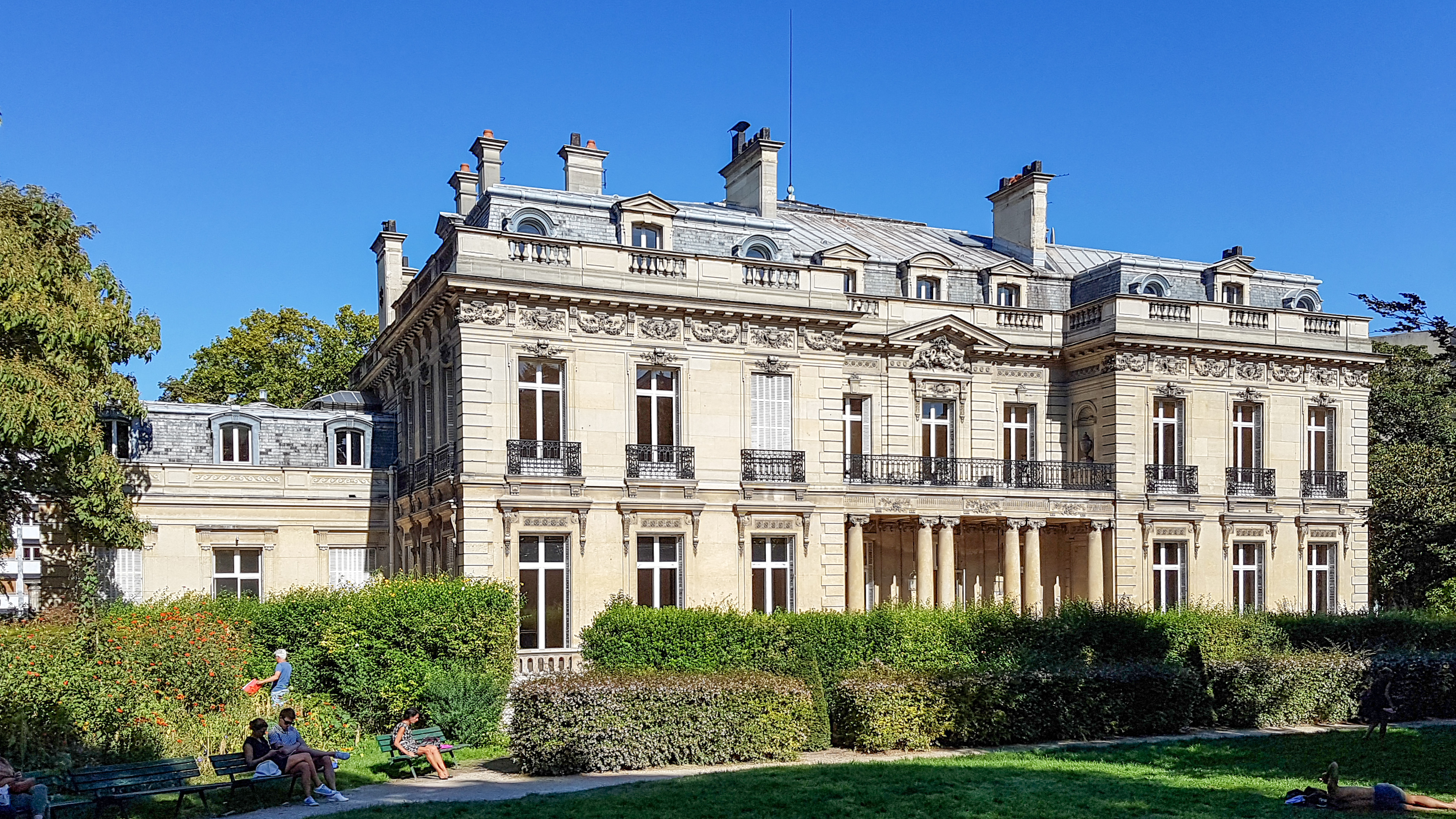
- Gardens of the Hôtel
- Interactive map of Jardin de l'Hôtel-Salomon-de-Rothschild
- Type: Urban park
- Location: 8th arrondissement, Paris
- Coordinates: 48°52′31″N 2°18′10″E
- Area: 1.05 acres (0.42 ha)
- Created: 1998
- Status: Open all year
- Public transit: Located near the Métro station George V

The Garden of the Hôtel-Salomon-de-Rothschild is a park in the 8th arrondissement of Paris, in the Faubourg-du-Roule district.

== Location and access ==
The site is accessible from 12 Avenue de Friedland, Place Georges-Guillaumin and Rue Balzac.

It is served by line 1 at the George V metro station.

== History ==
In 1784, Nicolas Beaujon had an country estate built called La Folie-Beaujon on which the garden is found. The house and grounds were purchased by the Baroness Salmon de Rothschild in 1873 and 1882. She donated the land to the French state on her death. The chapel of Saint-Nicolas-de-Beaujon was demolished to make way for the rotunda.

Open to the public thanks to the generosity of the National Foundation for Graphic and Plastic Arts, this garden is part of the Hôtel Salomon de Rothschild.
