= Hôtel Salomon de Rothschild =

Coordinates: 48°52′31″N 2°18′11″E

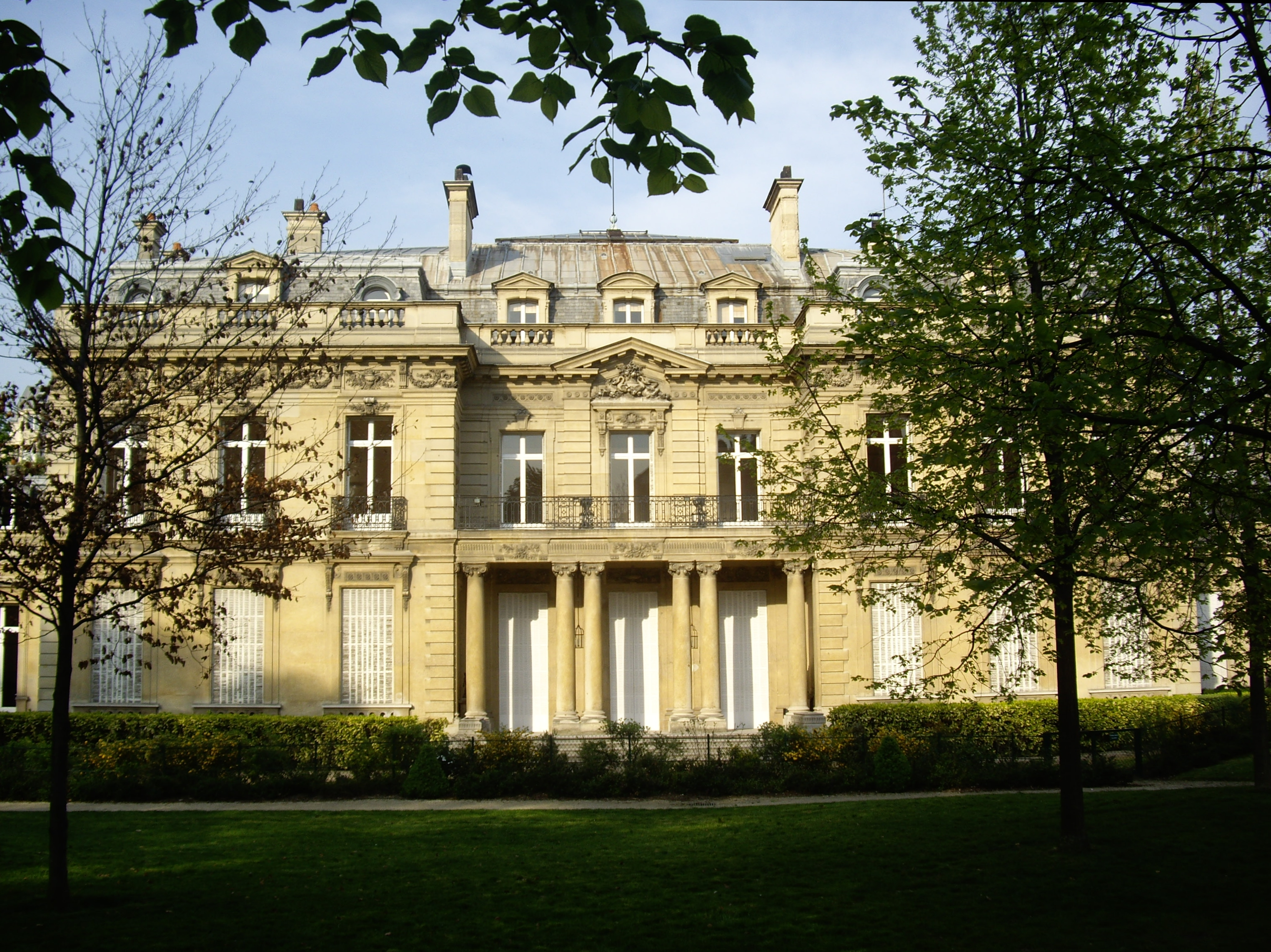
- Hôtel Salomon de Rothschild, garden side
- Interactive map of the Hôtel Salomon de Rothschild area

General information
- Location: Paris, France

Hôtel Salomon de Rothschild is a hôtel particulier located at 11 rue Berryer in the 8th arrondissement in Paris, France. It is a former residence of Adèle von Rothschild (1843–1922), the widow of Salomon James de Rothschild of the Rothschild banking family of France. Designed by Leon Ohnet and constructed between 1872 and 1878, it is located in the heart of Paris, near the Rue du Faubourg Saint-Honoré. On her death in 1922, Adèle von Rothschild bequeathed the property to the French government fine arts administration rather than to her only child, Hélène de Rothschild, whom she had disinherited for marrying a Roman Catholic.

The hotel was the site of a presidential assassination on 6 May 1932. French President Paul Doumer was at a book fair in the hotel when a mentally unstable Russian émigré, Paul Gorguloff, opened fire at him. Doumer died the following morning.

Today the building is home to the Centre national de la photographie and its manicured garden, Jardin de l'Hôtel-Salomon-de-Rothschild, is open to the public. The following cultural and socio-educational organizations currently are in the building:

- A.D.A.G.P (Ste des Auteurs Arts Graphiques et Plastiques)
- Foundation Albert Gleizes
- Foundation Nationale des Arts Graphiques Plastiques (F.N.A.G.P.)
- Les Amis de Nogent
- Maison des Artistes
- Société Nationale des Beaux Arts
- Syndicat National des Sculpteurs

The hotel closed for renovations from June 2023 and was scheduled to reopen one year later.
