= George V station =

Paris Métro station

George V
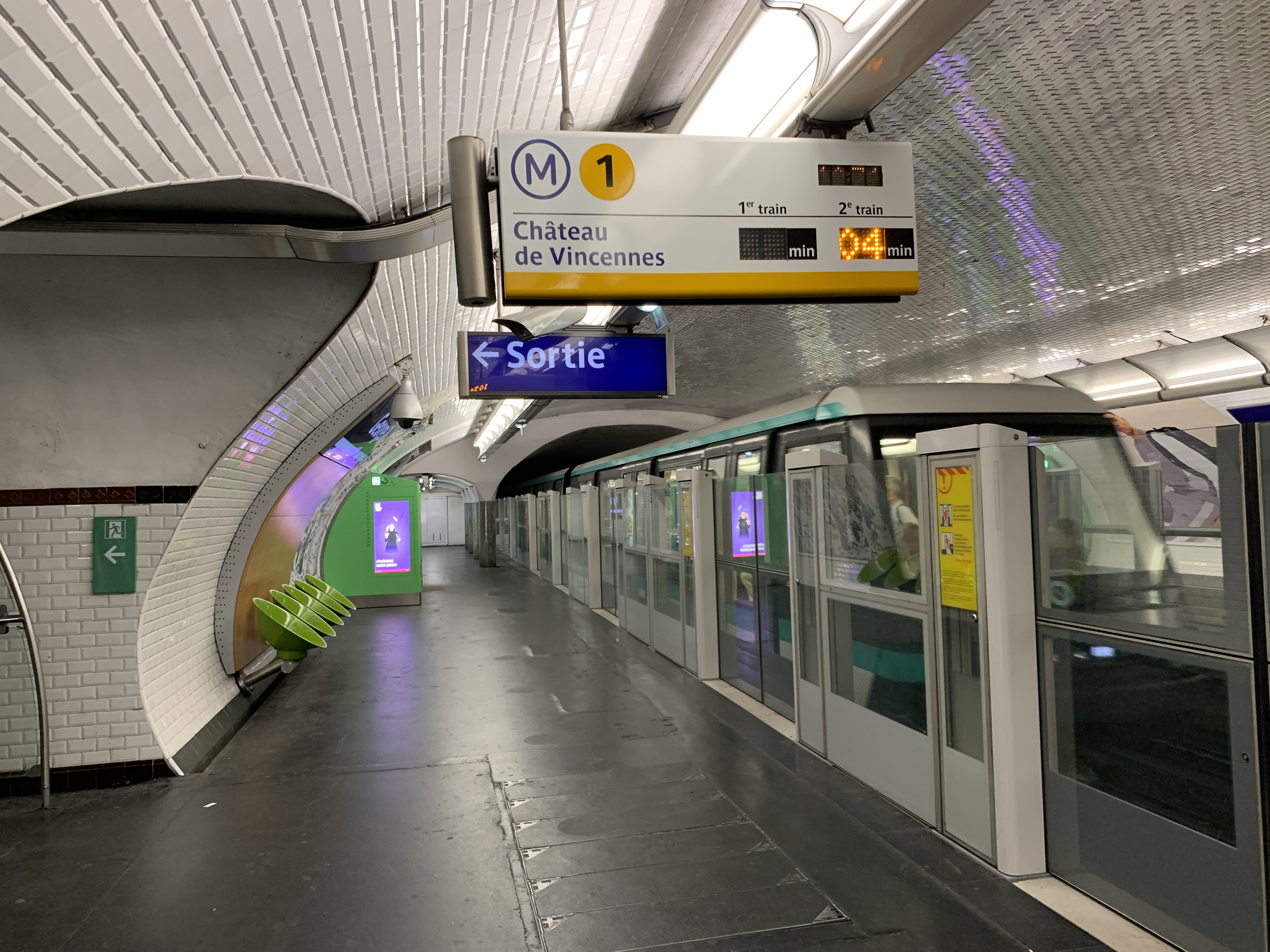
- Station platforms

General information
- Location: 101, av. des Champs-Élysées; 118, av. des Champs-Élysées; 8th arrondissement of Paris; Île-de-France; France
- Coordinates: 48°52′19″N 2°18′02″E
- Owner: RATP
- Operator: RATP

Other information
- Fare zone: 1

History
- Opened: 1 August 1900; 126 years ago
- Former names: Alma (1900–1920)

Services
Preceding station	Paris Metro	Following station
Charles de Gaulle–Étoile towards La Défense	Line 1	Franklin D. Roosevelt towards Château de Vincennes
Route map
Location
- Location within Paris

George V (French: [ʒɔʁʒ(ə) sɛ̃k]) is a station on Line 1 of the Paris Métro, under the Champs-Élysées.

== History ==
The station was opened on 13 August 1900, almost a month after trains began running on the original section of Line 1 between Porte de Vincennes and Porte Maillot on 19 July 1900. It was originally called Alma, after the nearby street named in honour of the Battle of Alma in the Crimean War.

On 27 May 1920 the street and station were renamed after George V of the United Kingdom in appreciation of the United Kingdom's support for France during World War I. The station entrance is located between Rue de Bassano and Avenue George V on the Champs-Élysées.

Like most of the stations on the line, between May 1963 and December 1964, the platforms were extended to 90 metres to accommodate trains of six cars with pneumatic bearings, intended to cope with severe chronic overloads. This extension is carried out by means of a crypt, as in five other stations, at the western end of the platforms in case. At the time, walls were clad in metal panels with white horizontal pillars and illuminated gilded advertising frames, later supplemented by yellow Motte style seats.

On November 21, 2003, to celebrate U.S. President George W. Bush's visit to Buckingham Palace, Bush's "admirers" renamed the station George W - Sovereign of Great Britain with name plate stickers.

As part of the automation of Line 1, the stopping point was renovated with the removal of the metalwork from the piers, and the platforms were raised between 29 October to 2 November 2008 to accommodate screen doors, which were installed by February 2011.

On September 19, 2022, the RATP replaced half of the nameplates on the platforms, for one day, to pay tribute to Queen Elizabeth II of the United Kingdom, whose funeral took place on the same day. The station was renamed "Elizabeth II", the British sovereign being the granddaughter of King George V honoured at the station. The Queen's name appears in capital letters with the words "1926 - 2022" written below in smaller characters, all on a black background as a sign of mourning instead of the usual midnight blue of the RATP name signs.

== Passenger services ==
=== Access ===
The station has two entrances on either side of the Avenue des Champs-Élysées:

- Access 1 - Champs-Élysées, consisting of a fixed staircase adorned with a stone balustrade by the architect Joseph Cassien-Bernard, located to the right of no. 118 of the said avenue;
- Access 2 - Avenue George-V, consisting of a fixed staircase doubled by an escalator, located opposite no. 101, between Avenue George-V and Rue de Bassano.

In the access corridors to the platforms, some signs indicating the list of stations on the line to each terminus have the particularity of using the Helvetica font, tested in some stations of the network in the 1990s before the creation of the Parisine typography, which would later be generalized to all RATP signage.

=== Station layout ===
Street Level
M	Mezzanine for platform connection
P Line 1 platforms	Side platform with PSDs, doors will open on the right
P Line 1 platforms	Platform 1	← toward La Défense – Grande Arche (Charles de Gaulle – Étoile)
P Line 1 platforms	Platform 2	toward Château de Vincennes (Franklin D. Roosevelt)→
P Line 1 platforms	Side platform with PSDs, doors will open on the right

=== Platforms ===
George V is a standard station: it has two platforms 90 metres long separated by the metro tracks located in the centre and the vault is elliptical. A 15-metre-long crypt, whose ceiling rests on closely spaced pillars, has extended the station's length at its western end since the line was switched to six-car trains in the 1960s. The decoration is in the style used for the majority of metro stations, combined with the specific layouts of this line since its automation. The lighting canopies are white and rounded in the Gaudin style of the Metro Renewal of the 2000s, and the bevelled white ceramic tiles cover the walls, the vault and the tunnel exits and corridor outlets. The vault of the crypt is painted white, while its columns are covered with small dark tiles. The advertising frames are made of white ceramic and the name of the station is inscribed in Parisine font on backlit panels, most of which are incorporated into wooden boxes. The platforms are equipped with green Akiko seats and have half-height screen doors.

=== Bus connections ===
The station is served by line 73 of the RATP Bus Network and, at night, by lines N11 and N24 of the Noctilien bus network.

== Nearby ==
- Avenue des Champs-Élysées
- Chamber of Commerce and Industry of Paris - Île-de-France region
- Hôtel Barrière Le Fouquet's
- Hotel George V, Paris
- Hotel Prince de Galles
- Le Lido (cabaret)
- Jardin de l'Hôtel-Salomon-de-Rothschild

== See also ==
- Similarly named places:
  - King George V DLR station, London
- Nearby stations:
  - Charles de Gaulle–Étoile
  - Franklin D. Roosevelt

== Bibliography ==
- Roland, Gérard (2003). Stations de métro. D’Abbesses à Wagram. Éditions Bonneton.
