= Rue Roquépine =

Street in Paris, France

Coordinates: 48.8734°N 2.3198°E

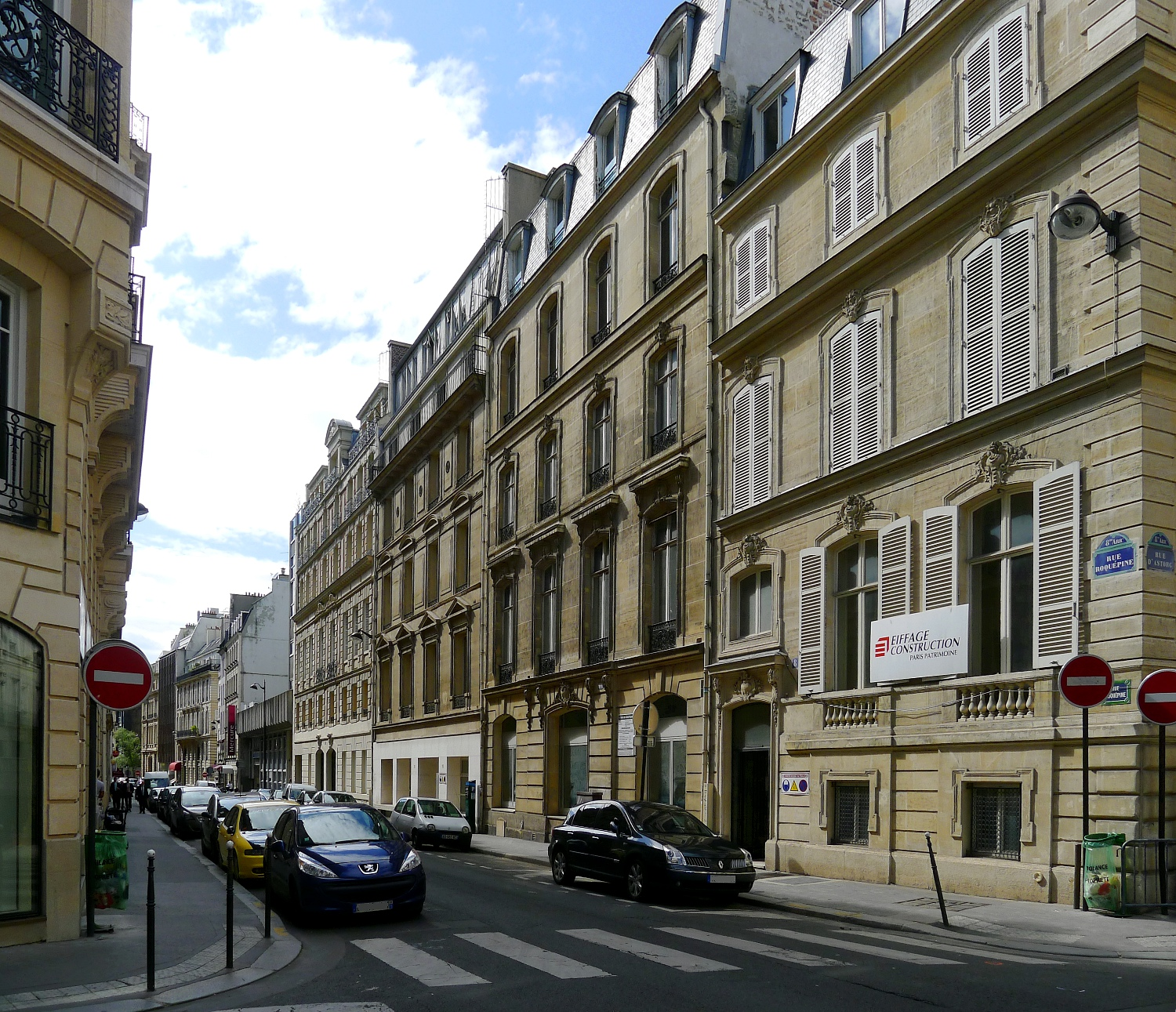
Rue Roquépine in 2011

The Rue Roquépine is a street in the 8th arrondissement of Paris, France. It was built in 1774 on land formerly owned by Louis d'Astorg d'Aubarède, Marquess of Roquépine.

Since 2019, the Protestant temple at 5 Rue Roquépine houses the local group of Girl Scouts Eclaireurs Unionistes de France. The Roquépine marine unit is housed in a spacious room on the second floor of the temple.
