= Rue Greffulhe =

Street in Paris, France

Coordinates: 48.8730°N 2.3253°E

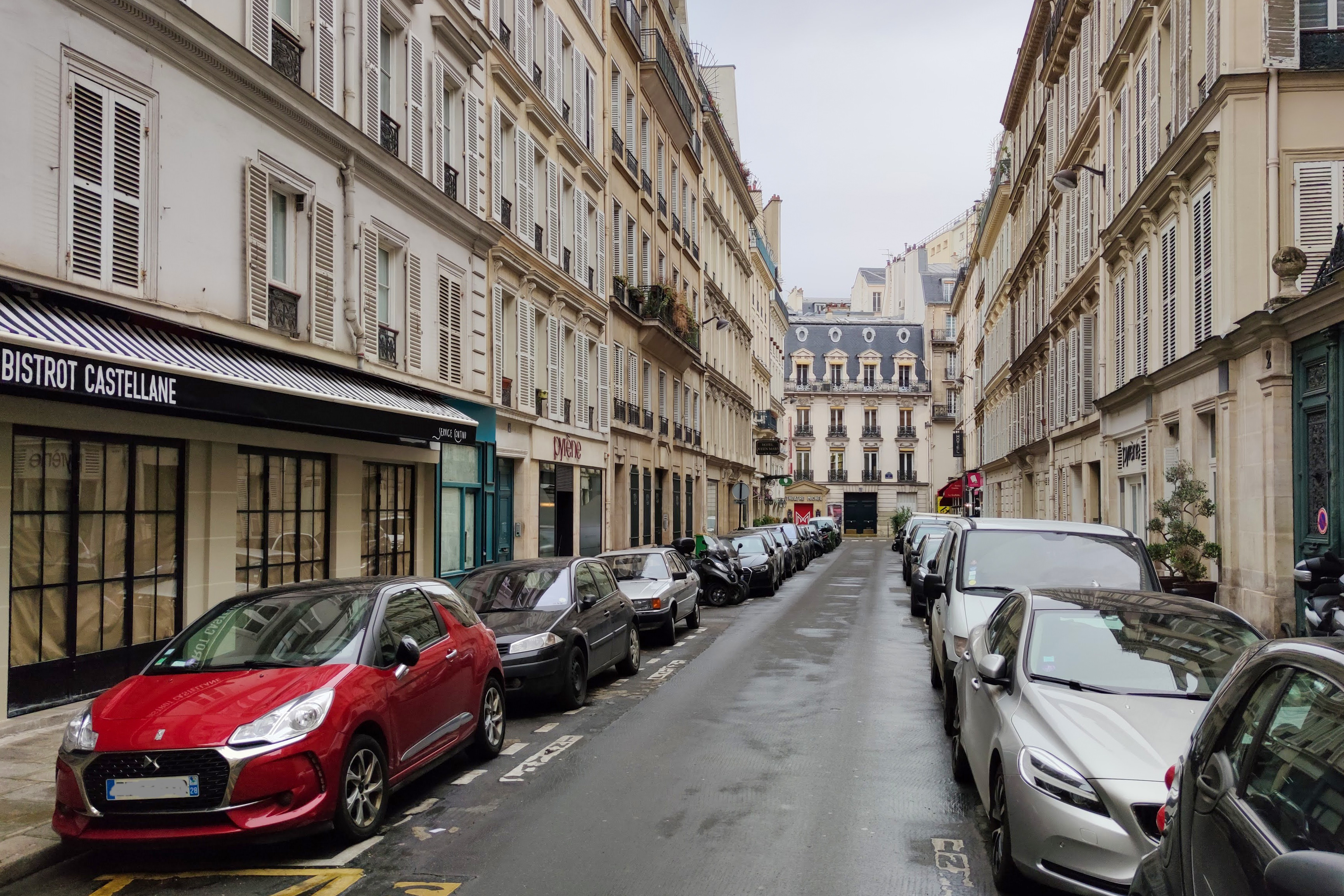
The street in 2021

The Rue Greffulhe is a street in the 8th arrondissement of Paris, France. It was named after Count Louis-Charles Greffulhe, who was the owner of the land prior to its construction in 1839. Composer Georges Hugon lived at no. 5 while Reynaldo Hahn lived at no. 7.
