= Quartier des Champs-Élysées =

Administrative district in Paris

Coordinates: 48.869815826416016°N 2.3077890872955322°E

Champs-Élysées
- Quartier des Champs-Élysées
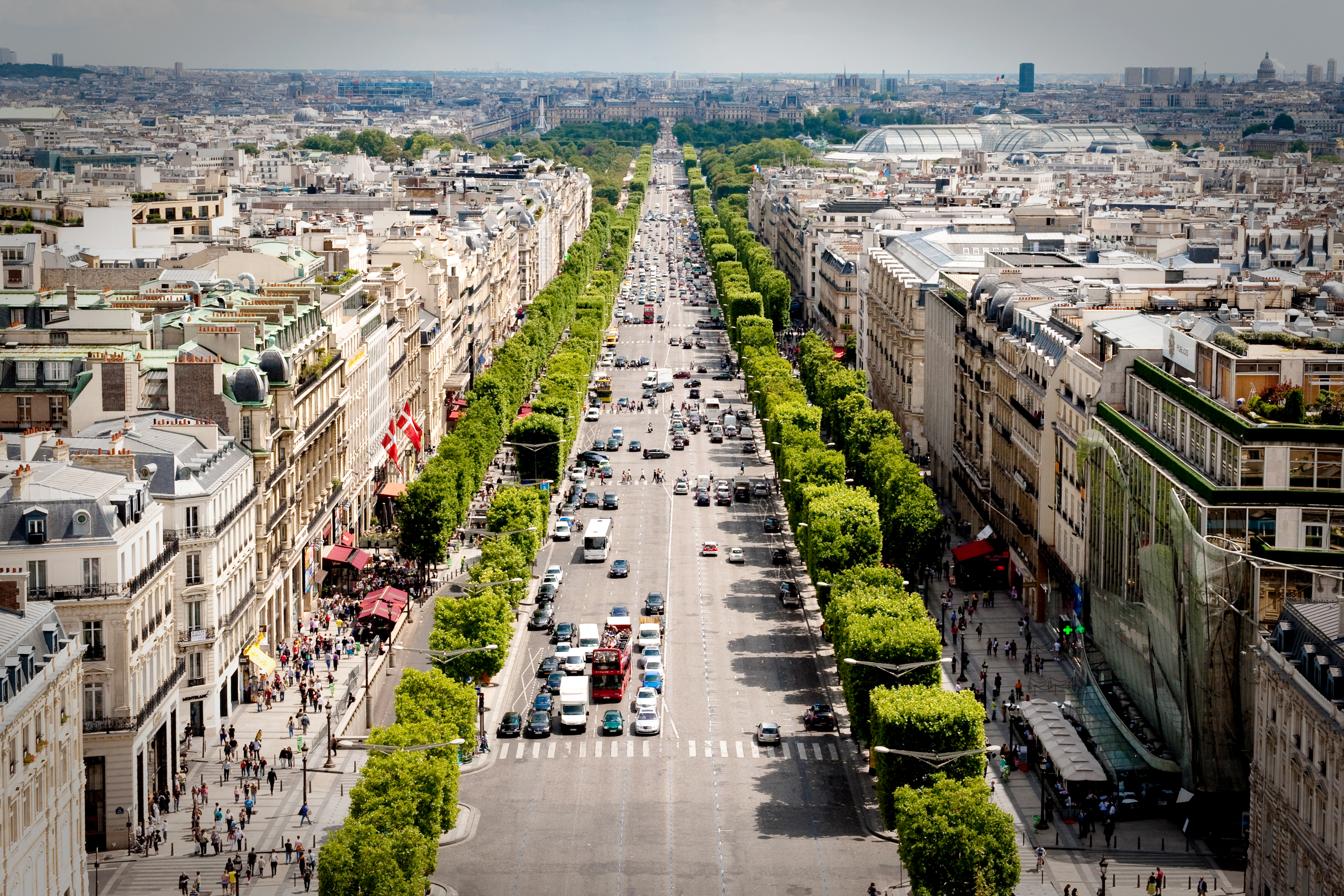
- Champs-Élysées
- Interactive map of Champs-Élysées
- Country: France
- Region: Île-de-France
- Ville: Paris
- Arrondissement: 8th

Area
  - Total: 1.141 km^{2} (0.441 sq mi)

Population (2016)
  - Total: 2,792
  - Density: 2,447/km^{2} (6,340/sq mi)

The Quartier des Champs-Élysées is the 29th administrative district of Paris, located in the 8th arrondissement.

Its territory is bordered to the north by the "most beautiful avenue in the world," namely the Champs-Élysées (from Place Charles de Gaulle to the Rond-Point des Champs-Élysées-Marcel-Dassault), part of Avenue Matignon, and Avenue Gabriel; to the east by Place de la Concorde; to the south by the Seine; and to the west by Avenue Marceau. It is a very popular area with tourists, but with 4,610 inhabitants in 1999, it is the least populated district in the arrondissement, partly because some of the Haussmannian buildings have been converted into offices or commercial premises. The Golden Triangle, delimited by Avenue Montaigne, Avenue George V and the Champs-Élysées, is, within the district, particularly renowned for its luxury businesses and shops.

== History ==
In what was then a sparsely urbanized area of western Paris, the Champs-Élysées section was created in 1790. This administrative district became the Champs-Élysées neighborhood in 1795, located at that time within the 1st arrondissement of Paris. Its boundaries ran from the middle of the right bank of the Seine, from the Pont Louis XVI to the Barrière de Passy, then along the right bank of the Seine to the Barrière du Roule, continuing along the Rue du Faubourg-du-Roule, Rue du Faubourg Saint-Honoré, Rue Royale, and Place Louis XV to the Pont Louis-XVI.

Following the 1860 reorganization, the neighborhood of the same name became smaller and was primarily located south of the avenue.

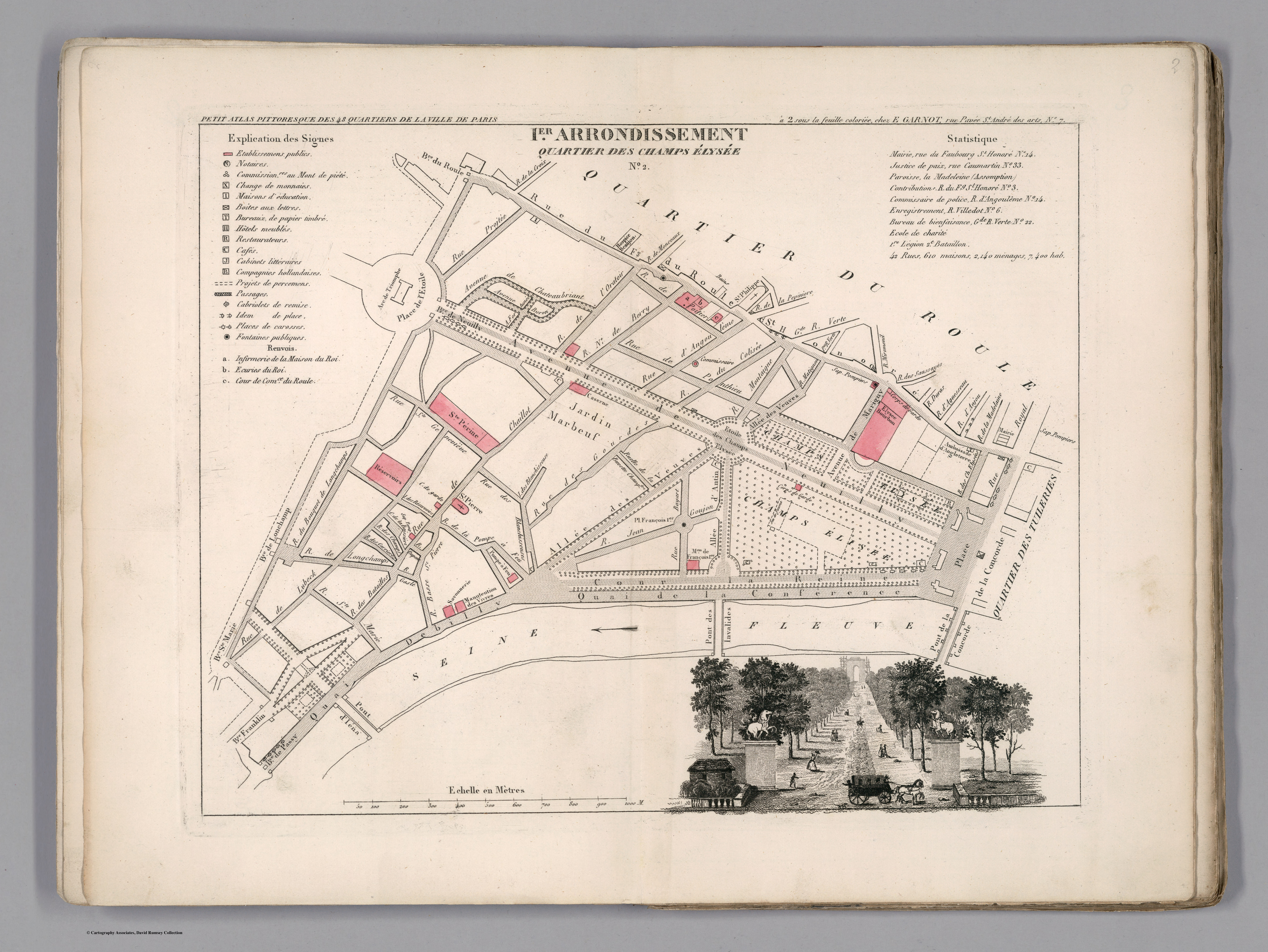
Map of the Champs-Élysées district in the former 1st arrondissement in 1834.

The Champs-Élysées district on a map of the 8th arrondissement.

== Notable places and buildings ==
- Champs-Élysées.
- Grand Palais, its national galleries, and the Palais de la Découverte.
- Petit Palais.
- Place de la Concorde and the Luxor Obelisk.
- Port de la Conférence (home to the Compagnie des Bateaux Mouches) and the Port des Champs-Élysées, along the Seine.

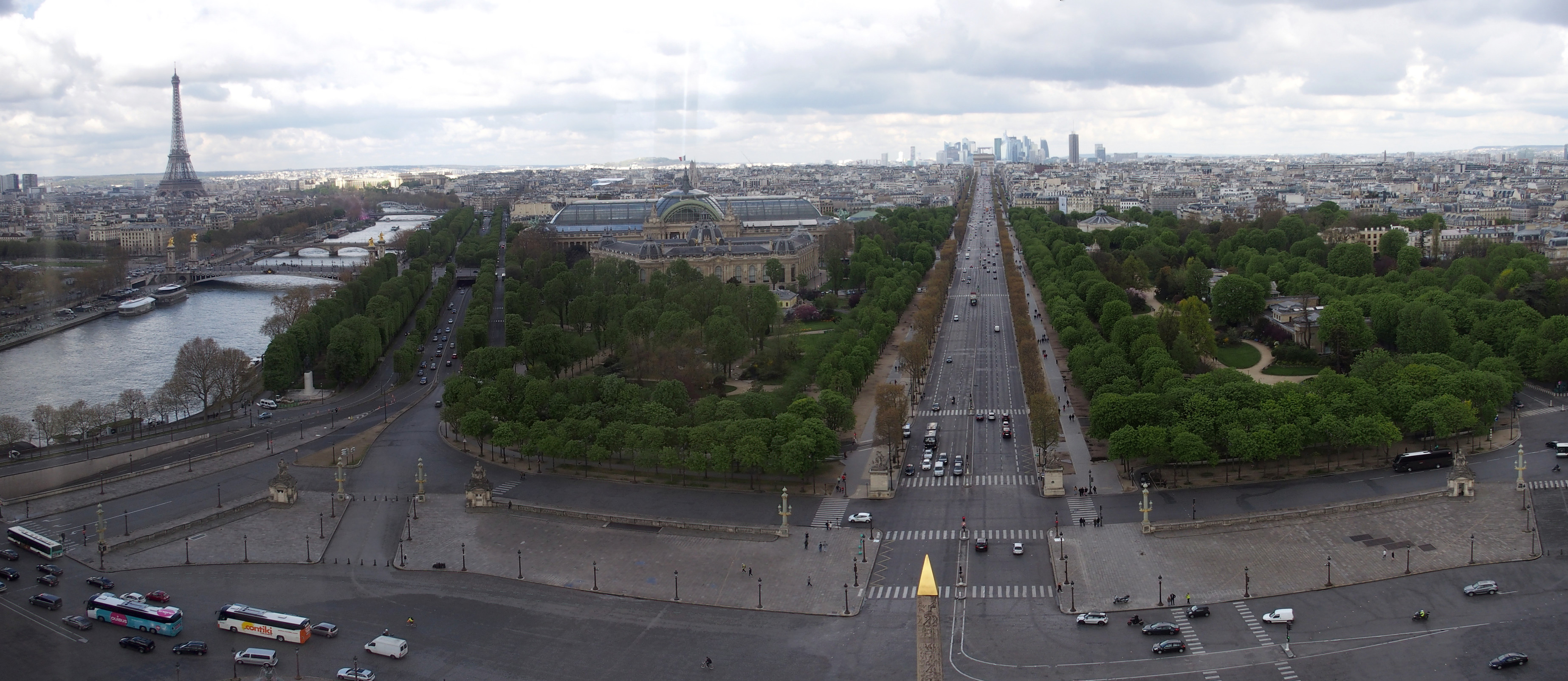
Panorama to the west, almost in line with the Avenue des Champs-Élysées, from the top of the Roue de Paris.

=== Embassies ===
- Embassy of Germany, Avenue Franklin D. Roosevelt.
- Embassy of Brazil, Cours Albert I.
- Embassy of China, Avenue George V.
- Embassy of Spain, Avenue George V.
- Embassy of Norway, Rue Bayard.

=== Green spaces ===
- Jardin de la Nouvelle-France.
- Jardins des Champs-Élysées.
- Square de Berlin.
- Jardin d'Erevan.
- Jardin de Kyiv.

=== Places of worship ===
- Cathedral of the Holy Trinity in the United States
- Armenian Cathedral of St. John the Baptist
- Chapel of Notre-Dame-de-Consolation, Paris

=== Performance venues ===
- Crazy Horse Saloon.
- Espace Cardin.
- Théâtre des Champs-Élysées.
- Théâtre Marigny.
- Théâtre du Rond-Point.
- Théâtre Vrai Guignolet.

=== Bridges ===
- Pont de l'Alma.
- Pont des Invalides.
- Pont Alexandre III.
- Pont de la Concorde.
