= Rue Bayard, Paris =

French street

Rue Bayard
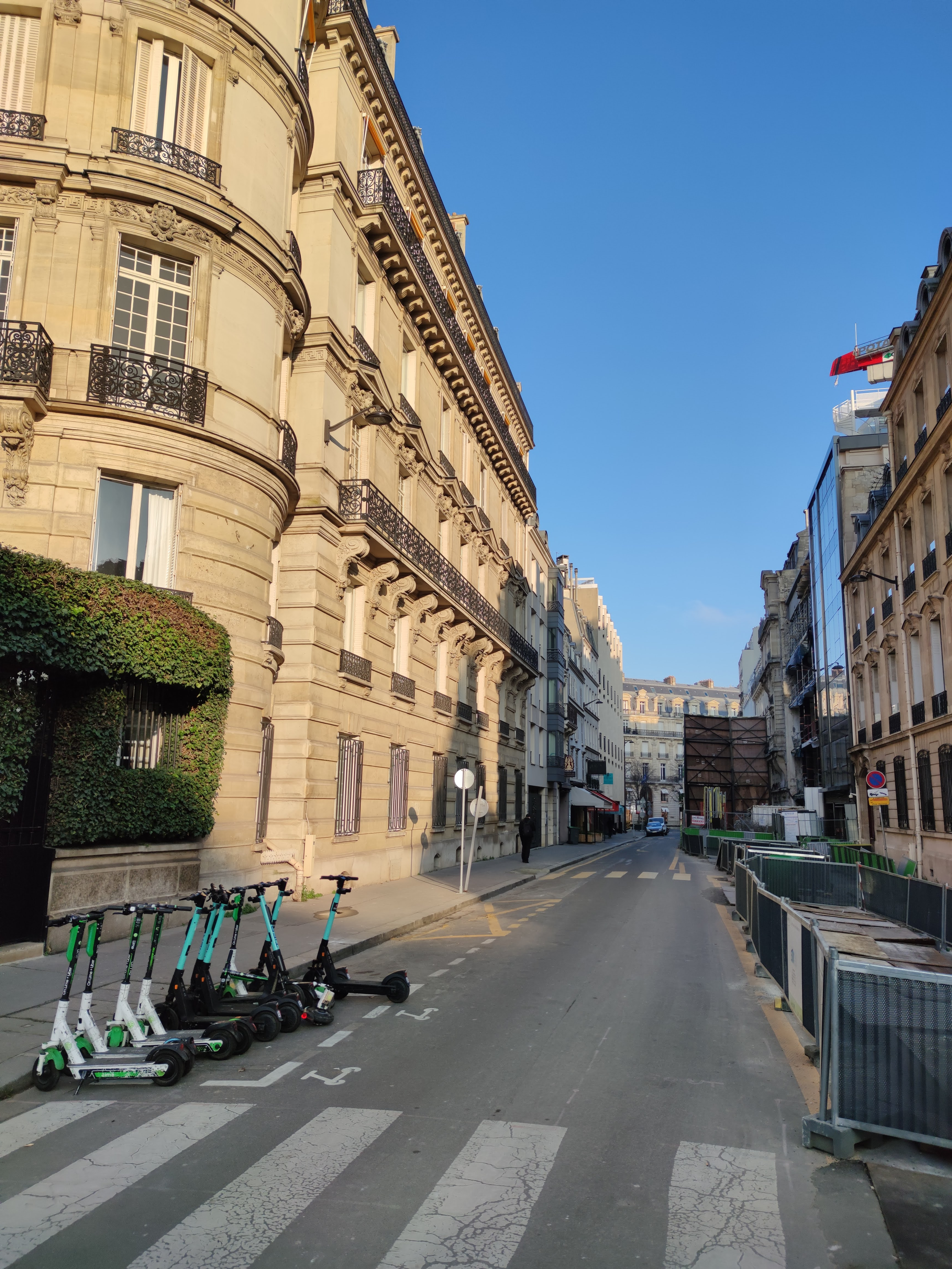
- Rue Bayard, seen towards Avenue Montaigne, in 2021.
- Type: street
- Location: Paris
- Arrondissement: 8th
- Quarter: Champs-Élysées
- Coordinates: 48°52′12″N 2°18′36″E

Rue Bayard is a street in the 8th arrondissement of Paris.

== Location and access ==
It begins at 16, cours Albert-Ier and ends at 42, avenue Montaigne.

This site is served by line at Alma–Marceau station, by lines at Franklin D. Roosevelt station, as well as by RATP bus lines 42 80 .

== Origin of the name ==
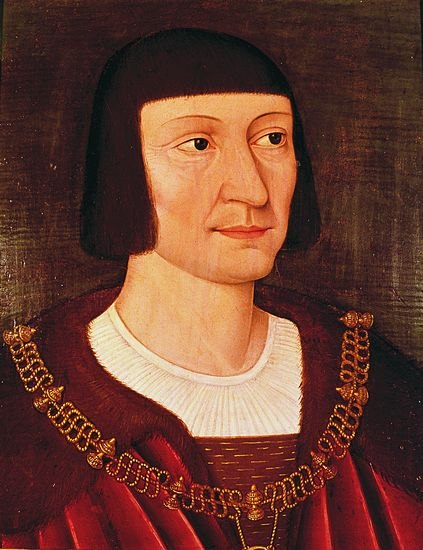
Bayard.

It received its name in honor of the « knight without fear and without reproach », Pierre Terrail, seigneur de Bayard (1476-1524), hero of the Italian Wars.

== History ==
By virtue of a royal order of July 23, 1823, a company, represented by Mr. Constantin, was authorized to open on its land:

«

- 1 – two streets, each 14.60 meters wide;
- 2 – a circular square 40.90 meters in diameter.

This authorization was granted under the following conditions:

- 1 – to provide free of charge the land necessary for the said streets and square;
- 2 – to cover the costs of the first paving and lighting;
- 3 – to practice, on the sides of the new open roads, slab sidewalks, and in addition to submit to the laws and regulations on the road of Paris, etc. »

This order was immediately executed: the two streets were given the names « rue Bayard-Champs-Élysées » and « rue Jean-Goujon » and the square that of « place François-Ier ».

== Remarkable buildings and places of memory ==
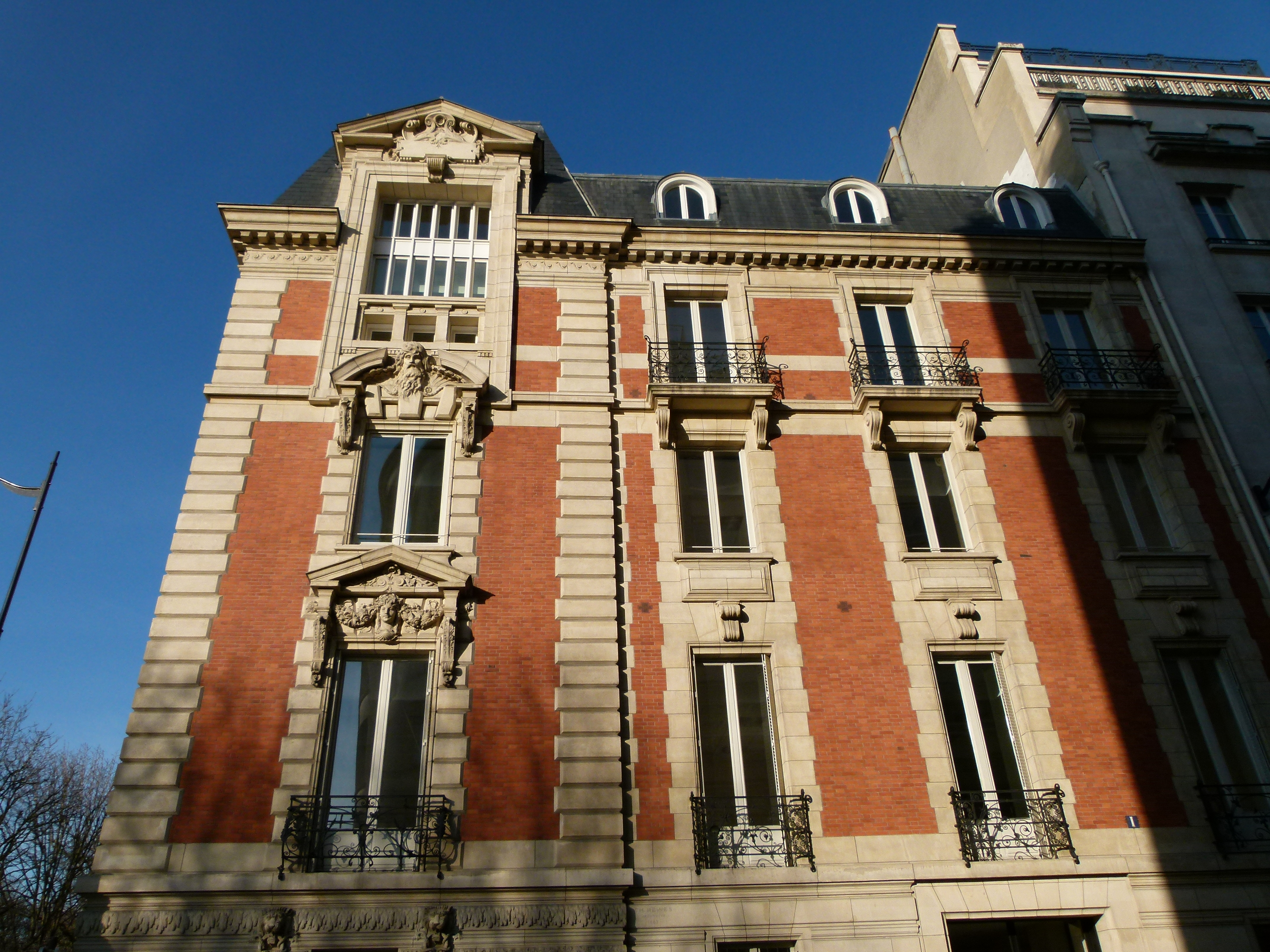
Facade of N°1.

- N°1: neo-Louis XIII style brick and stone hotel built by Charles Ferry (1834-1909), former senator, and where his brother, Jules Ferry, died in 1893.
- N°3: former headquarters, until 2008 before the move to the city of Montrouge, of Éditions Bayard, which became the Bayard Presse in press publishing.
- N°7: home of the Marquis Charles-Auguste Choiseul-Beaupré and the Marquise (who became Duke and Duchess in 1909), an American born Claire Coudert (1864-1919), who was the muse and model of Auguste Rodin.
- N°8: hotel of G. Roussigné in 1910.
- N°17: The Scots Kirk, Presbyterian church linked to the Church of Scotland.
- N°20: former address of the studios of the radio station Fun Radio.
- N°28: Embassy of Norway.

=== Buildings destroyed ===
- N°1: the painter Léon Riesener (1808-1878) acquired the land located at the corner of rue Bayard and cours la Reine (today cours Albert-Ier) in 1846 and had it built there, according to plans that he himself had built, a private mansion, mentioned by Eugène Delacroix in his Journal. The painter spent his entire life there. The hotel then passed to his three daughters. In his house, Léon Riesener rented an apartment in 1859 to the Duchess of Castiglione-Colonna, known as a sculptor under the pseudonym Marcello.
- N°2: (corner of cours la Reine): location of the so-called Maison de François Ier, destroyed in 1956, which gave its name to the district; in neo-Renaissance style, it presented, on the river side, a real 16th century facade, coming from Moret-sur-Loing where it had been purchased and dismantled before being reassembled in Paris.
- N°3: workshop of Gustave Doré.
- N°22: Mr. Nivert's hotel in 1910.
- N°22: former headquarters of the radio division of the RTL group in France (RTL, Fun Radio and RTL2), Radio Luxembourg had a studio there since 1936. The facade, created by Victor Vasarely in collaboration with his son Yvaral, was inaugurated in 1972, and was dismantled in 2017 to be graciously donated to the Fondation Vasarely in Aix-en-Provence. The group moved to Neuilly-sur-Seine in 2018.
- N°24: former address of the studios of the radio station RTL2.

== Sources ==
- André de Fouquières Mon Paris et ses Parisiens (in French), Paris, Pierre Horay, 1953, vol. 1.
- Félix de Rochegude, Promenades dans toutes les rues de Paris. VIIIe arrondissement (in French) (Hachette ed.). Paris. 2010.
