= Rue de Laborde =

Street in Paris, France

Coordinates: 48.8755°N 2.3173°E

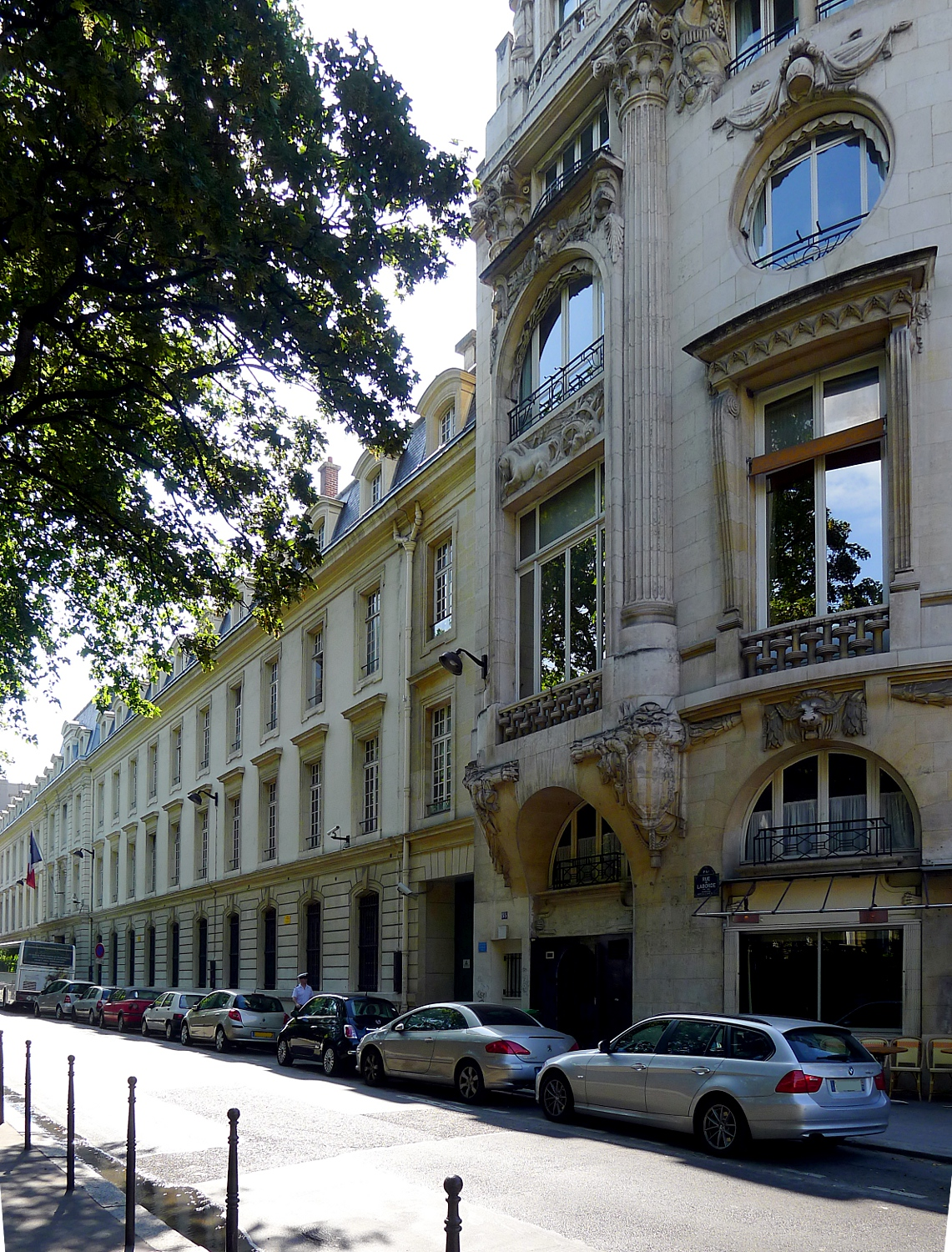
The Rue de Laborde in 2011

The Rue de Laborde is a street in the 8th arrondissement of Paris, France. It was built in 1788. It was named in honour of Alexandre de Laborde.
