= Jean-Henry-Louis Greffulhe =

French banker and politician

- Born: May 21, 1774; Amsterdam, Netherlands
- Died: February 23, 1820 (aged 45); Paris, France
- Occupation(s): Banker, politician
- Spouse: Marie-Françoise-Célestine-Gabrielle de Vintimille du Luc
- Children: Henri Greffulhe; Louis-Charles Greffulhe

Count Jean-Henry-Louis Greffulhe (May 21, 1774 – February 23, 1820) was a French banker and politician. He was the founder of a bank called Greffulhe Montz et Cie. He also served as a member of the Chamber of Peers from 1814 to 1820.
