= Henri Greffulhe =

French politician

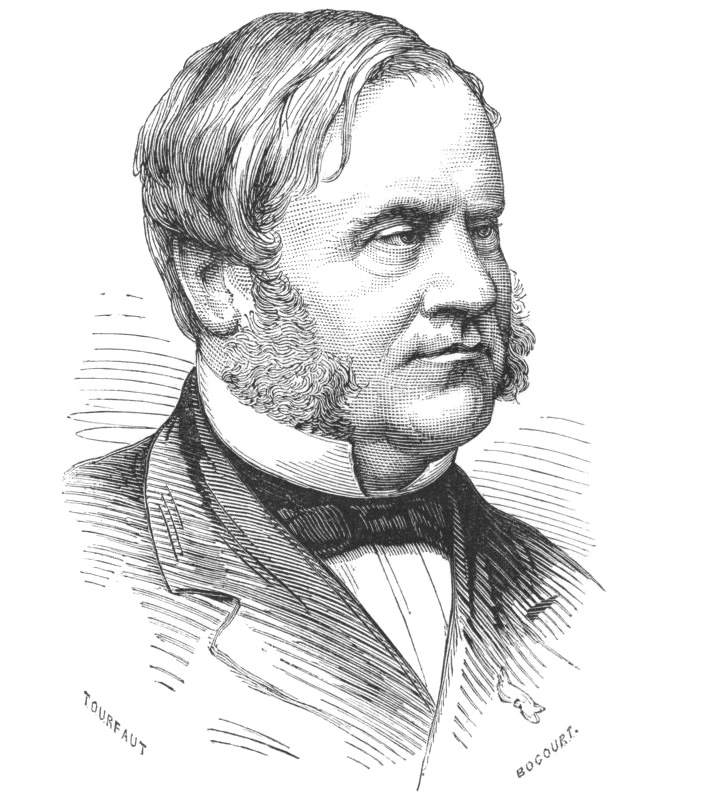
- Born: 29 July 1815; London, England
- Died: 8 April 1879 (aged 63); Paris, France
- Occupation: Politician
- Parent(s): Jean-Henry-Louis Greffulhe; Marie-Françoise-Célestine-Gabrielle de Vintimille du Luc
- Relatives: Louis-Charles Greffulhe (brother)

Urbain-Alexandre-Henri, comte Greffulhe (29 July 1815 – 8 April 1879) was a French politician. He was made a Senator for life.

The Prix Greffulhe flat horse race run at Saint-Cloud Racecourse every May is named after him.
