= Quartier de la Madeleine =

Administrative quarter in Paris, France

Coordinates: 48.8700°N 2.3244°E

The quartier de la Madeleine is the 31st administrative quarter of Paris, in the 8th arrondissement of Paris. It is named after the Church of Saint Mary Madeleine.

It shares a conseil de quartier, the Conseil de quartier Élysée-Madeleine, with another of the quartiers.

== Public monuments ==
- Élysée Palace, seat and residence of the President of France since the French Second Republic.
- Hôtel de Beauvais, seat of the Minister of the Interior since 1861.
- Hôtel de Charost, residence of the ambassador of the United Kingdom to France.
- Embassy of the United States in Paris

== Roads ==
- Boulevard Malesherbes
- Rue Tronchet (Paris)
- Rue des Mathurins
- Rue de la Ville-l'Évêque
- Cité Berryer
- Rue d'Aguesseau (Paris)
- Rue de Surène

== Places ==
- Place Beauvau
- Place de la Madeleine
- Place des Saussaies

== Private roads ==
- Passage de la Madeleine

== Gardens and squares ==
- Square Louis-XVI

== Religious buildings ==
- Église de la Madeleine
- Chapelle expiatoire

== Transportation ==
- Madeleine metro station, on lines 8, 12 and 14 of the Paris Métro
- Gare de la Madeleine (project)
