= Chapel of Notre-Dame-de-Consolation, Paris =

Roman Catholic chapel in Paris, France

Coordinates: 48°51′56″N 2°18′22″E

Chapelle Notre-Dame-de-la Consolation
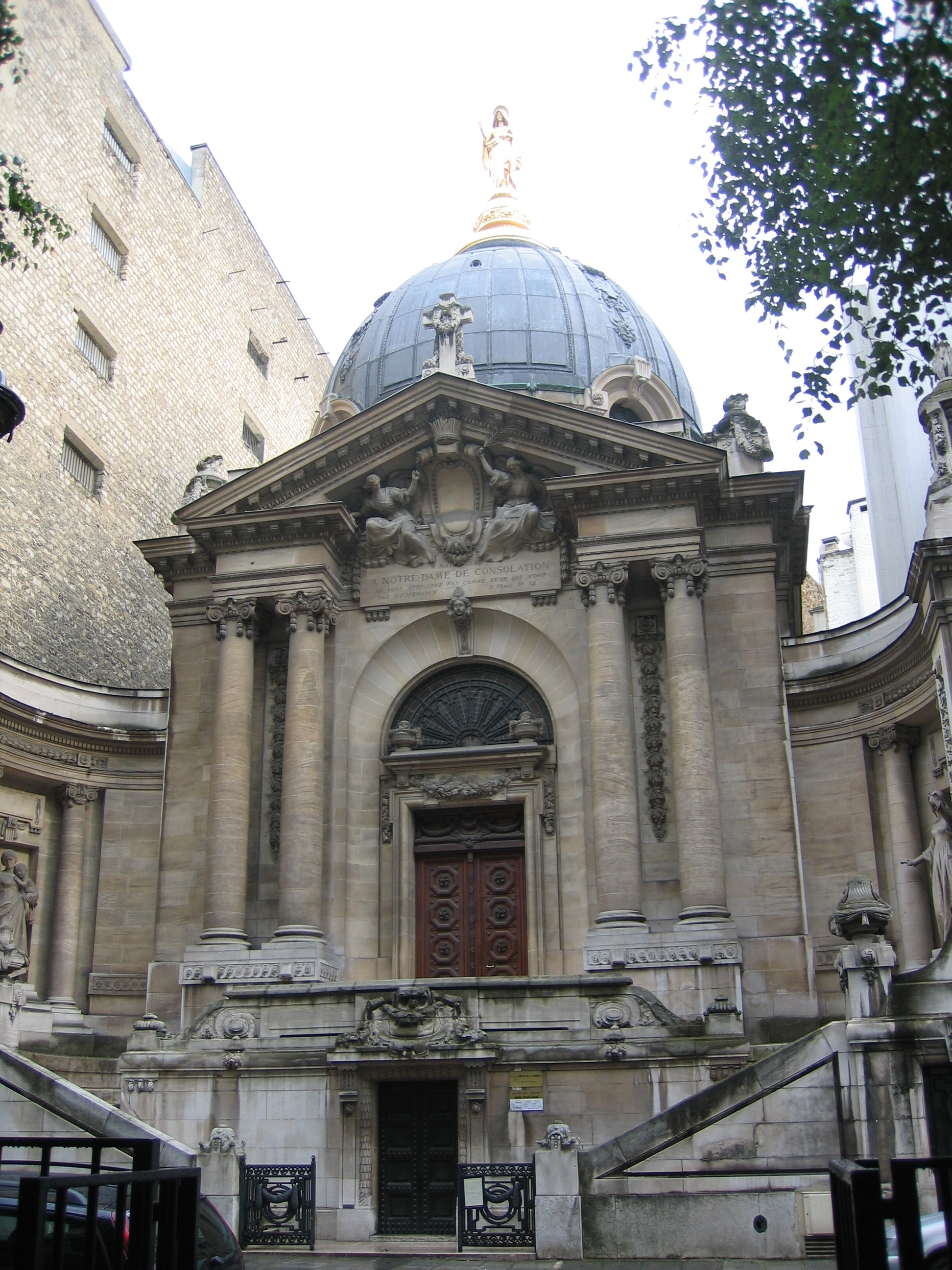
- Chapelle Notre-Dame-de-La-Consolation

Religion
- Affiliation: Catholic Church
- Province: Archdiocese of Paris
- Rite: Roman Rite

Location
- Location: 8th arrondissement of Paris
- Interactive map of Chapelle Notre-Dame-de-la Consolation

Architecture
- Style: Neo-Classical
- Groundbreaking: 1898
- Completed: 1900

The Chapel of Notre-Dame-de-la-Consolation is a Roman Catholic chapel located in the 8th arrondissement of Paris at 23 Rue Jean-Goujon. It was built to preserve the memory of 140 persons, mostly women and children, who died in a fire while attending an auction to raise money for charity on 4 May 1897. The chapel was built beginning 1898 by architect Albert-Desire Guilbert. It was consecrated in 1900. The architect received a gold medal for his church design at the Paris Universal Exposition of 1900.

The chapel belongs to and is maintained by the Association du Memorial du Bazaar de la Charite, composed of descendants of the victims. From 1953 to 2012, the clergy of the church were provided by the Italian Catholic Mission in Paris. In January 2013 the Scalabrinian priests who staffed the parish were transferred to Saint-Pierre-de-Chaillot, and in March 2013 the chapel's administration was given over to the Society of St. Pius X.

== Exterior ==
The church facade is neo-classical, preceded by a stairway with a double ramp. On the wings of the fronton are allegorical statues representing Faith and Charity. At the summit of the dome is a statue of Notre-Dame de la Consolation by Horace Daillion (1854-after 1937).

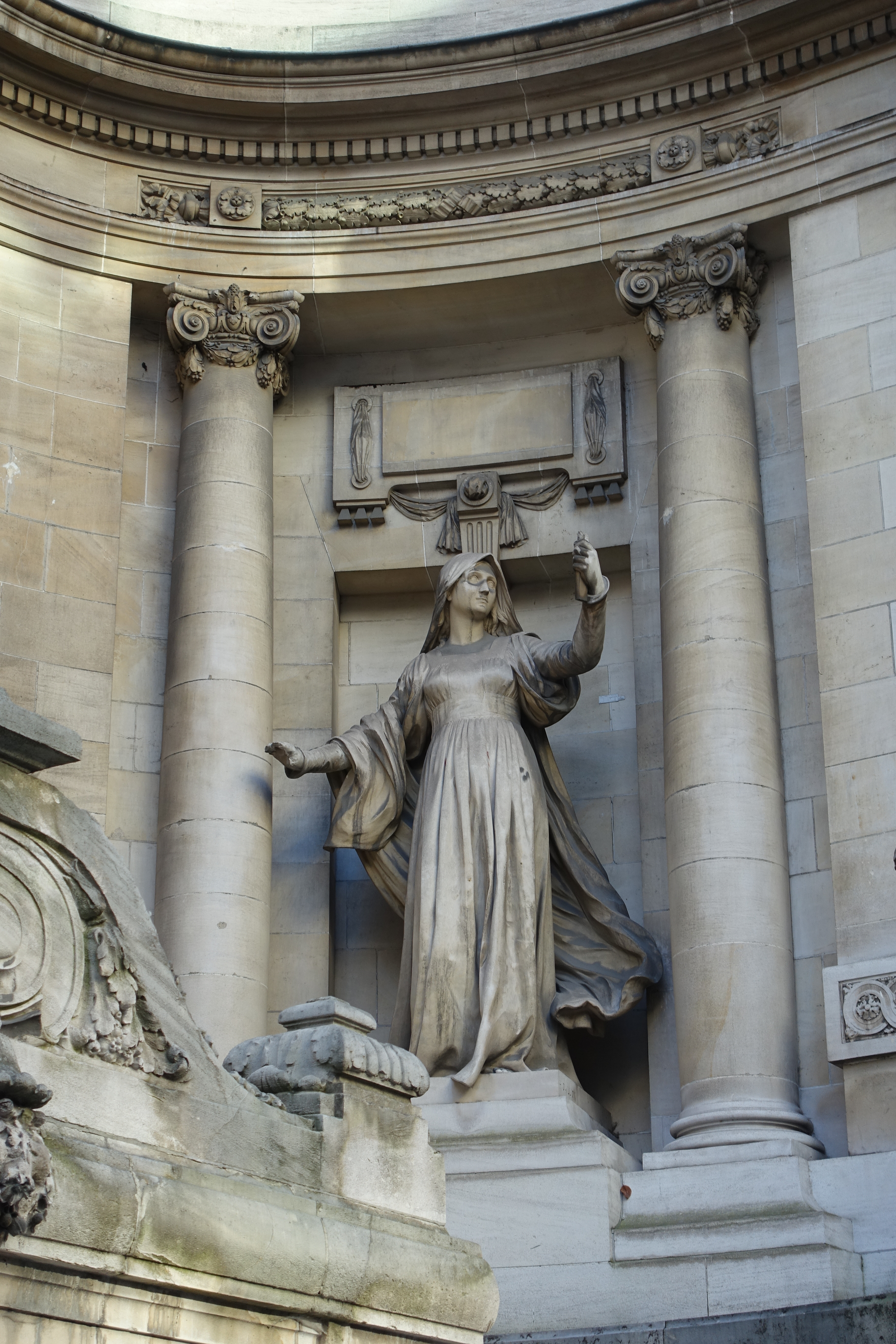

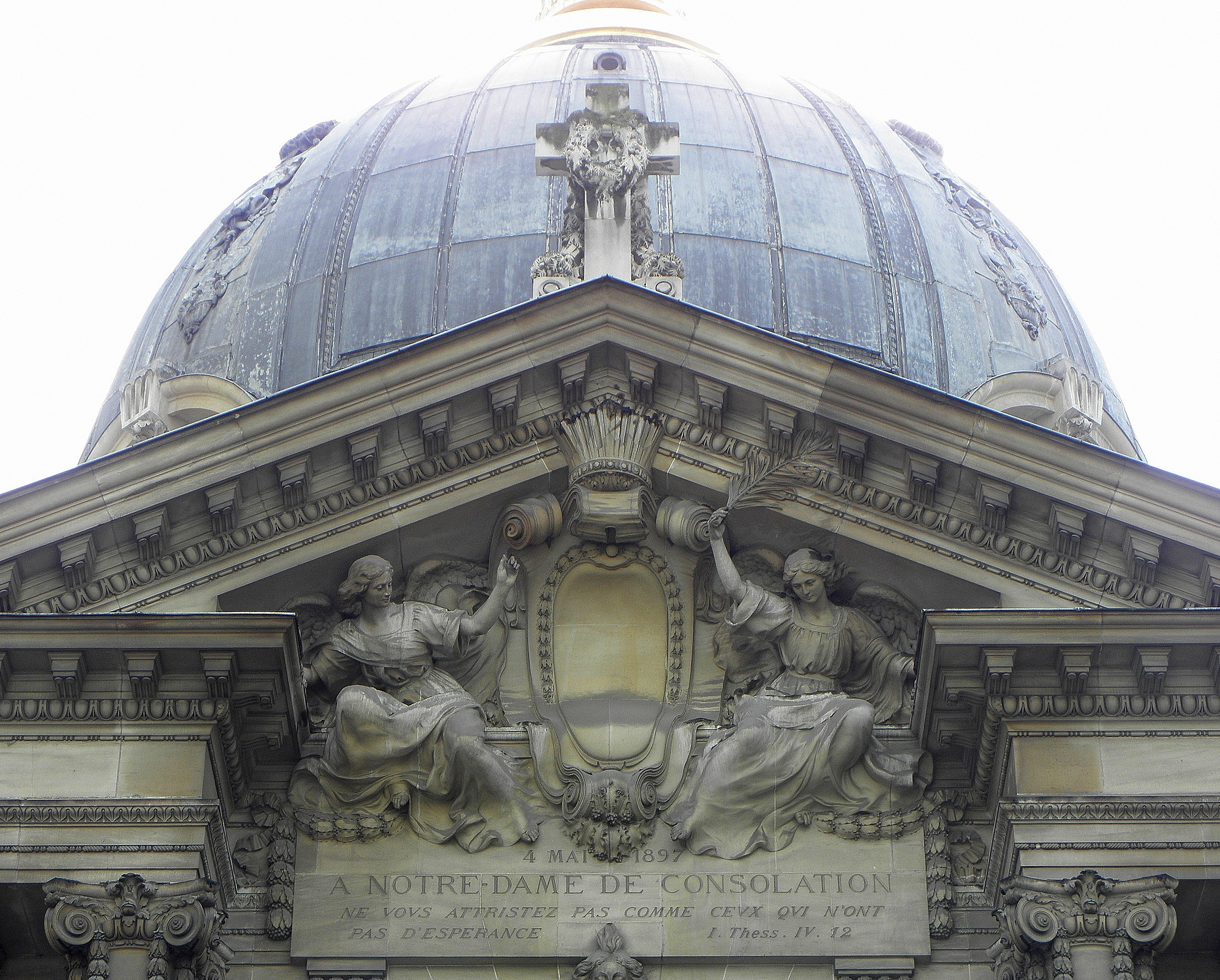

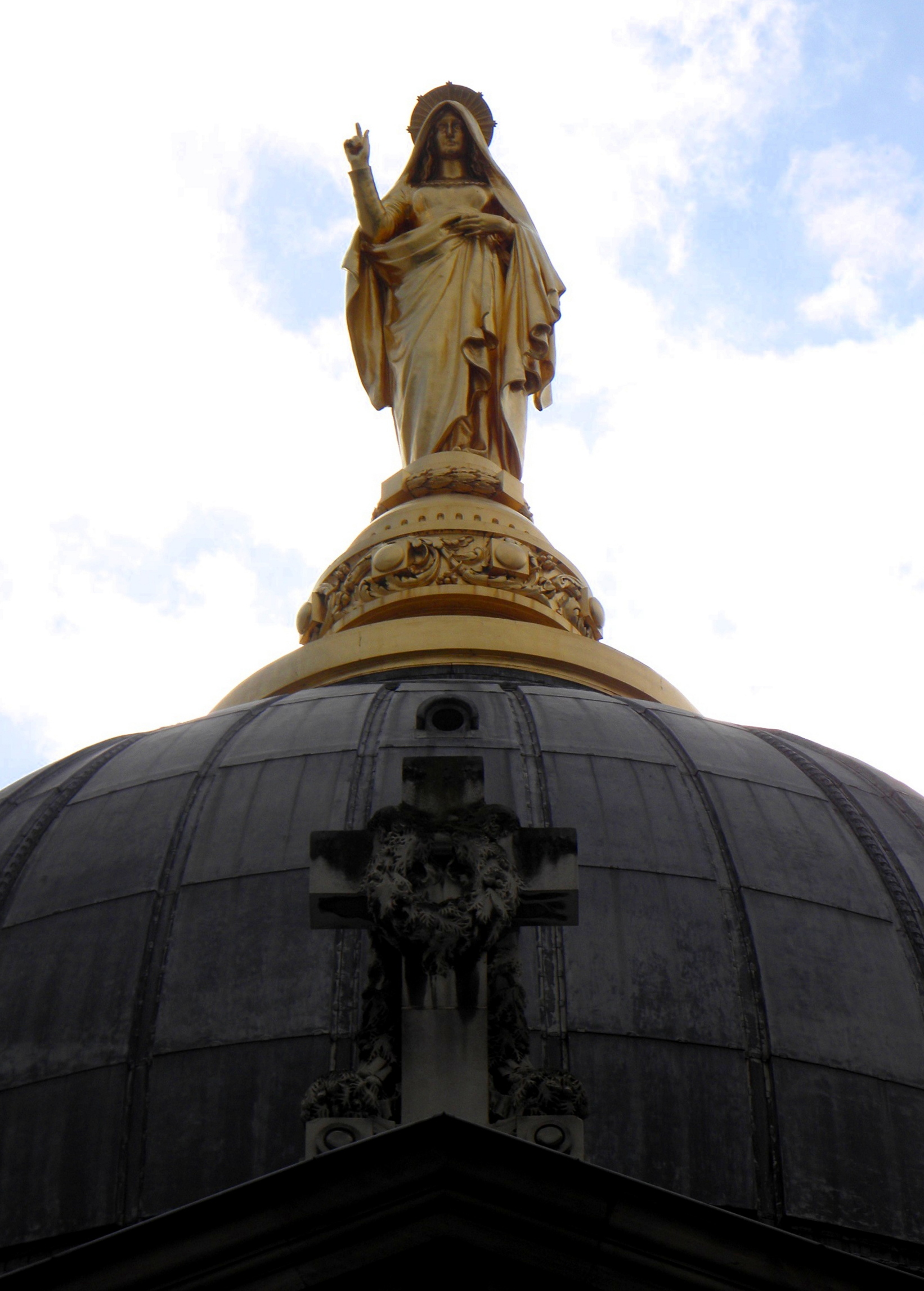
Statue of Notre Dame de la Consolation

== Interior ==
The interior is particularly lavish, filled with decoration to honor those who gave their lives participating in a charitable cause.

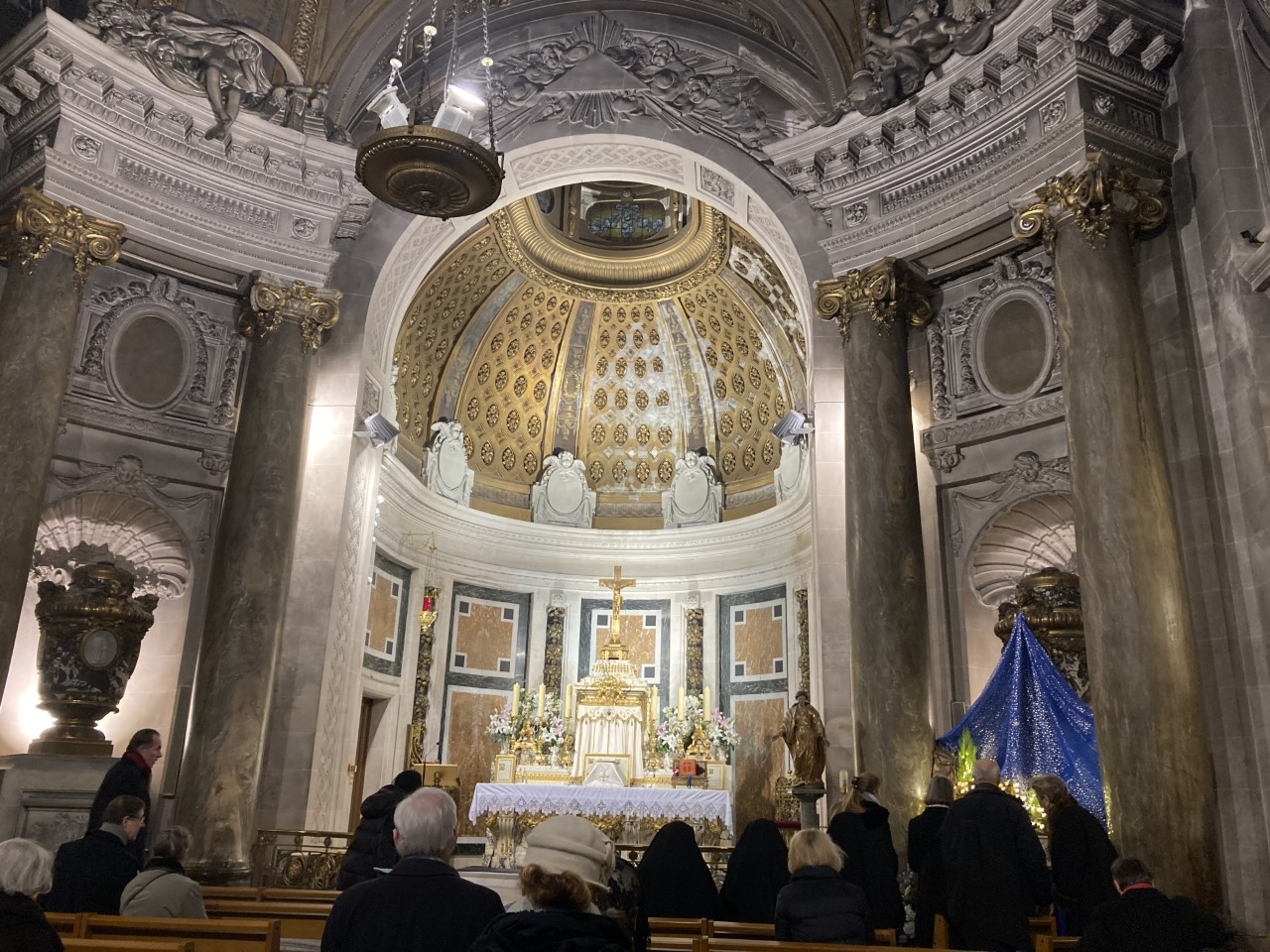
The choir and altar

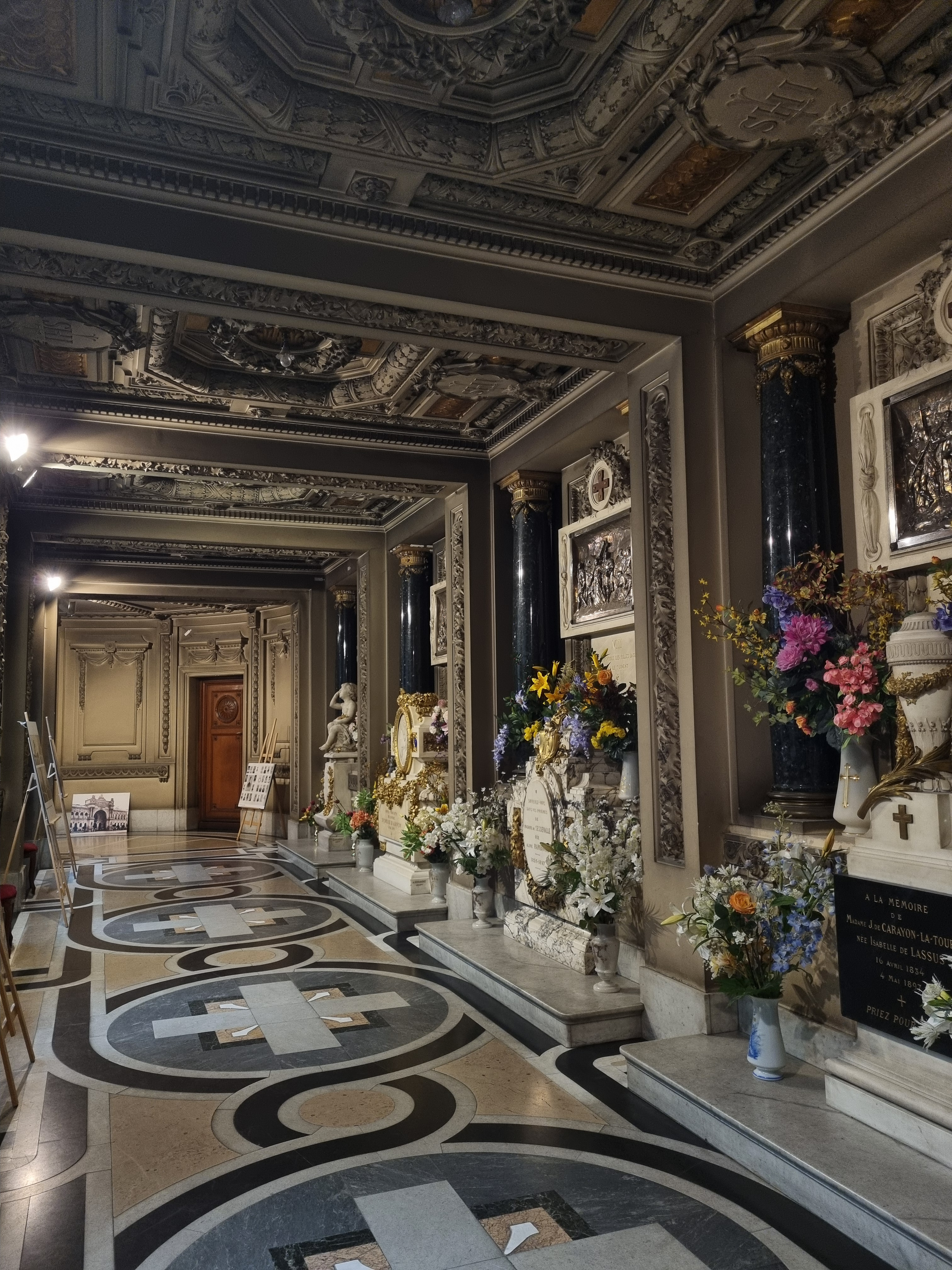
Way of the Cross

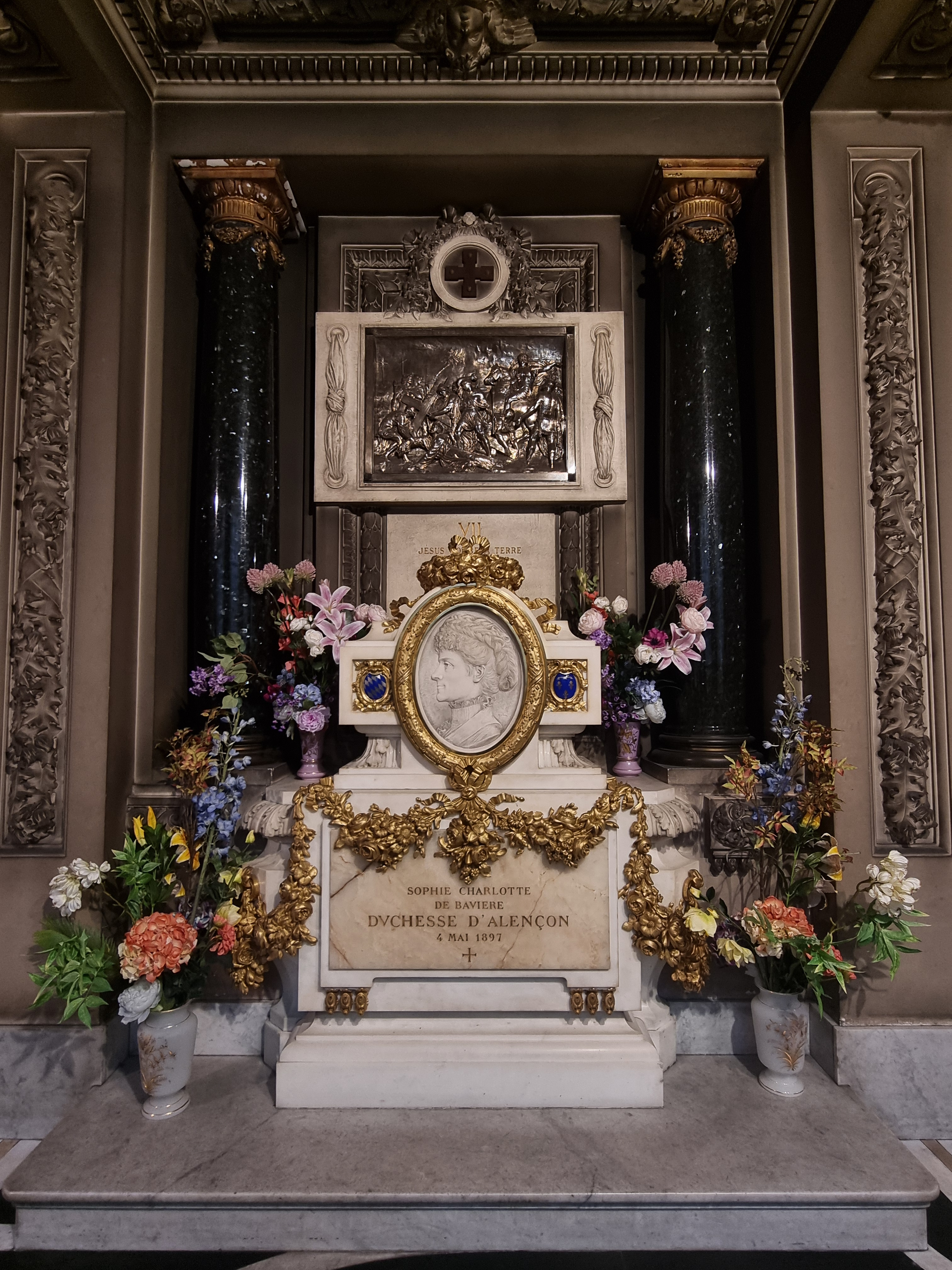
Memorial to one victim, the Duchesse d'Alencon

== Sources ==
- Dumoulin, Aline et al. "Chapelles de Paris" Massin publishers, (2012)
