= Louis-Charles Greffulhe =

French count and politician

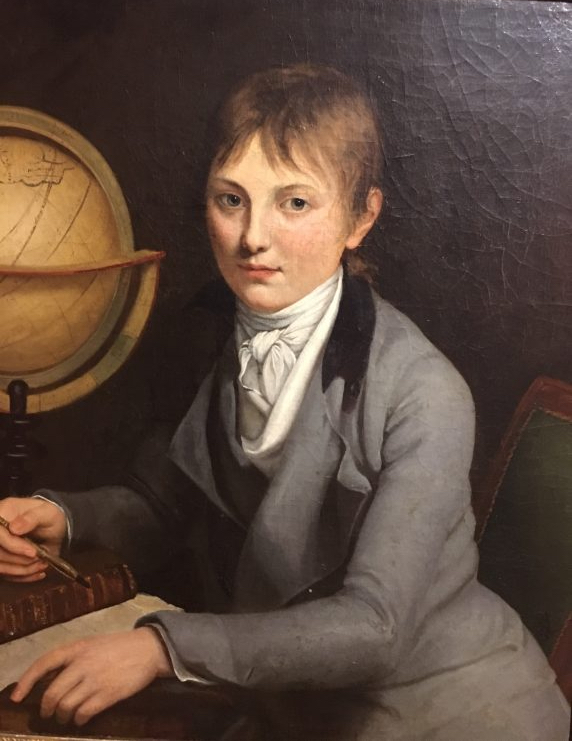
- Portrait of Greffulhe as a young geographer
- Born: 9 February 1814; Rouen, France
- Died: 27 September 1888 (aged 74); Paris, France
- Occupation: Politician
- Spouse: Félicité-Pauline-Marie de La Rochefoucauld d'Estissac
- Children: 3, including Henry
- Parent(s): Jean-Henry-Louis Greffulhe; Marie-Françoise-Célestine-Gabrielle de Vintimille du Luc
- Relatives: Henri Greffulhe (brother)

Louis-Charles Greffulhe (9 February 1814 – 27 September 1888) was a French count and politician. He was the elder son of Jean-Henry-Louis Greffulhe and his wife, Marie-Françoise-Célestine-Gabrielle de Vintimille du Luc. She was a granddaughter of Charles de Vintimille and the great-great-great-great-granddaughter of adventuress Hortense Mancini.

He served as a member of the French Chamber of Peers from 1839 to 1848. He was a supporter of King Louis-Philippe.

He was married to Félicité-Pauline-Marie de La Rochefoucauld d'Estissac. They had three children, including Henry Greffulhe.
