= Quartier du Faubourg-du-Roule =

Coordinates: 48°52′29″N 2°18′08″E

8e arrondissement

The quartier du Faubourg-du-Roule or 30th quarter of Paris is a 79.7-hectare (197-acre) administrative quarter of Paris, in its 8th arrondissement. Its borders are marked by place de l'Étoile, place de la République-de-l'Équateur, avenue Matignon and the rond-point des Champs-Élysées-Marcel-Dassault.

A notable building is the Russian Orthodox Cathedral.
