= 8th arrondissement of Paris =

- Municipal arrondissement
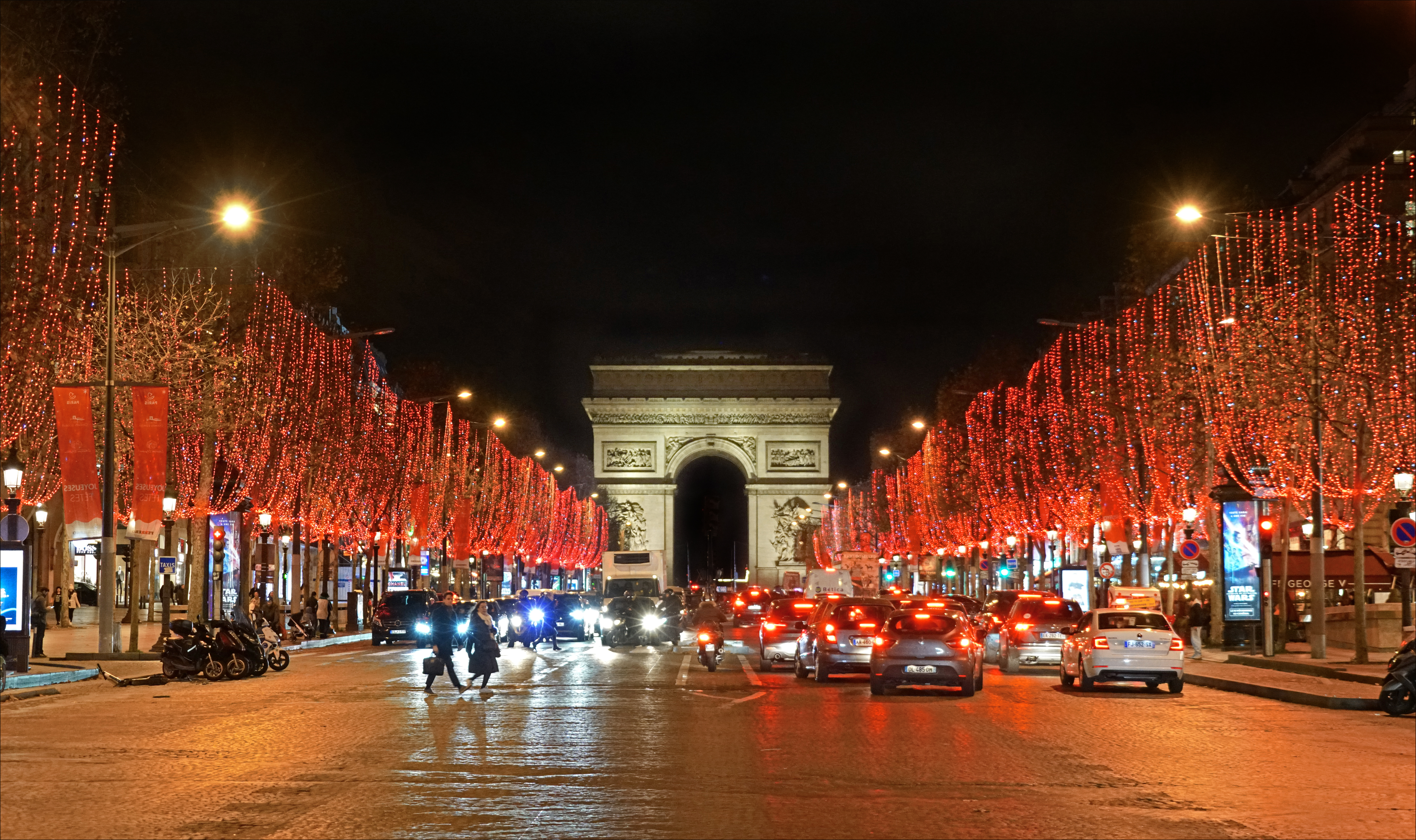
- The Champs-Élysées during the Christmas season

- Coat of arms

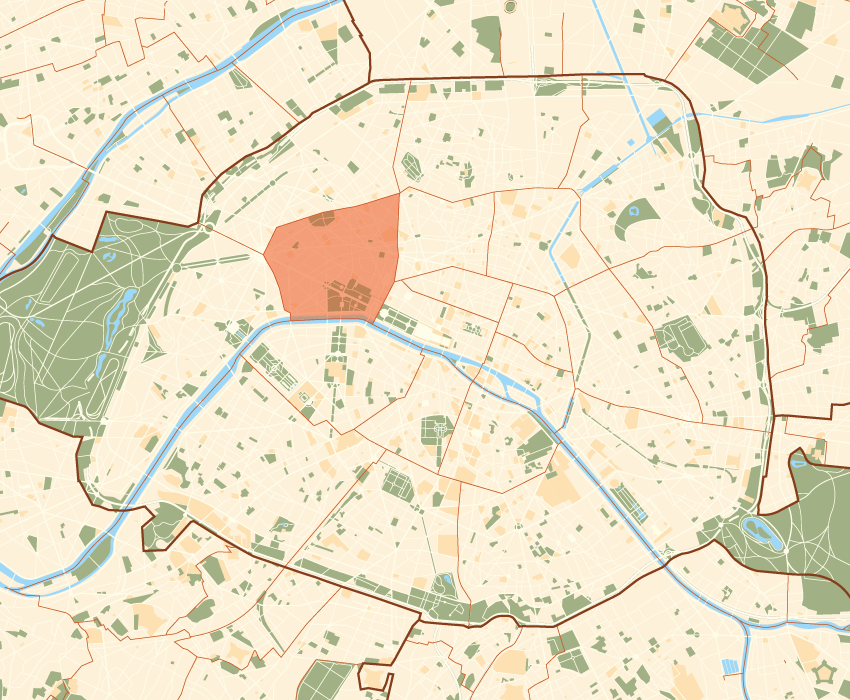
- Location within Paris
- Coordinates: 48°52′27″N 2°18′40″E
- Country: France
- Region: Île-de-France
- Department: Paris
- Commune: Paris

Government
  - Mayor (2020–2026): Jeanne d'Hauteserre (LR)
- Area: 3.88 km^{2} (1.50 sq mi)
- Population (2023): 35,317
  - Density: 9,100/km^{2} (23,600/sq mi)
- INSEE code: 75108

The 8th arrondissement of Paris (French: 8e arrondissement de Paris) is one of the 20 arrondissements of the capital city of France. In spoken French, the arrondissement is colloquially referred to as le huitième (lit. 'the eighth').

The arrondissement, called Élysée, is situated on the right bank of the River Seine and centered on the Avenue des Champs-Élysées. The 8th arrondissement is, together with the 1st^{,} 9th, 16th and 17th arrondissements, one of Paris' main business districts. According to the 1999 census, it was the place of employment of more people than any other single arrondissement of the capital. It is also the location of many places of interest, among them the Champs-Élysées, the Arc de Triomphe (partial) and the Place de la Concorde, as well as the Élysée Palace, the official residence and office of the President of France.

Most French fashion luxury brands have their main store in 8th arrondissement, Avenue Montaigne or Rue du Faubourg Saint-Honoré, both in the Champs-Élysées Avenue shopping district. In 2023, it had a population of 35,317.

== Geography ==
The land area of the arrondissement is 3.881 km^{2} (1.498 sq mi; 959 acres).

== Population ==
The arrondissement had its highest population of 107,485 in 1891. It is one of Paris's least densely populated arrondissements and contains 1.8% of the total population of Paris.

In September 2025 reports of a population decline in the 8th arrondissement pointed to a mass acquisition of real estate by wealthy investors that in turn drove the locals out.

=== Historical population ===
Historical population

Year	Pop.	±% p.a.
1861	69,814	—
1872	75,796	+0.75%
1881	91,962	+2.17%
1891	107,485	+1.57%
1901	107,171	−0.03%
1911	104,635	−0.24%
1921	97,344	−0.72%
1931	84,851	−1.36%
1936	77,543	−1.79%
1946	72,438	−0.68%
1954	80,827	+1.38%

Year	Pop.	±% p.a.
1962	74,577	−1.00%
1968	67,897	−1.55%
1975	52,999	−3.48%
1982	46,403	−1.88%
1990	40,814	−1.59%
1999	39,314	−0.42%
2007	39,165	−0.05%
2012	38,749	−0.21%
2017	36,808	−1.02%
2023	35,317	−0.69%

Source: Demographia (1861-1999) and INSEE (1876-2023)

=== Immigration ===
Place of birth of residents of the 8th arrondissement in 1999
Born in metropolitan France	Born outside metropolitan France			
75.4%	24.6%			
75.4%	Born in overseas France	Born in foreign countries with French citizenship at birth^{1}	EU-15 immigrants^{2}	Non-EU-15 immigrants
75.4%	0.6%	4.9%	8.5%	10.6%
^{1} This group is made up largely of former French settlers, such as pieds-noirs in Northwest Africa, followed by former colonial citizens who had French citizenship at birth (such as was often the case for the native elite in French colonies), as well as to a lesser extent foreign-born children of French expatriates. A foreign country is understood as a country not part of France in 1999, so a person born for example in 1950 in Algeria, when Algeria was an integral part of France, is nonetheless listed as a person born in a foreign country in French statistics.^{2} An immigrant is a person born in a foreign country not having French citizenship at birth. An immigrant may have acquired French citizenship since moving to France, but is still considered an immigrant in French statistics. On the other hand, persons born in France with foreign citizenship (the children of immigrants) are not listed as immigrants.

== Map ==
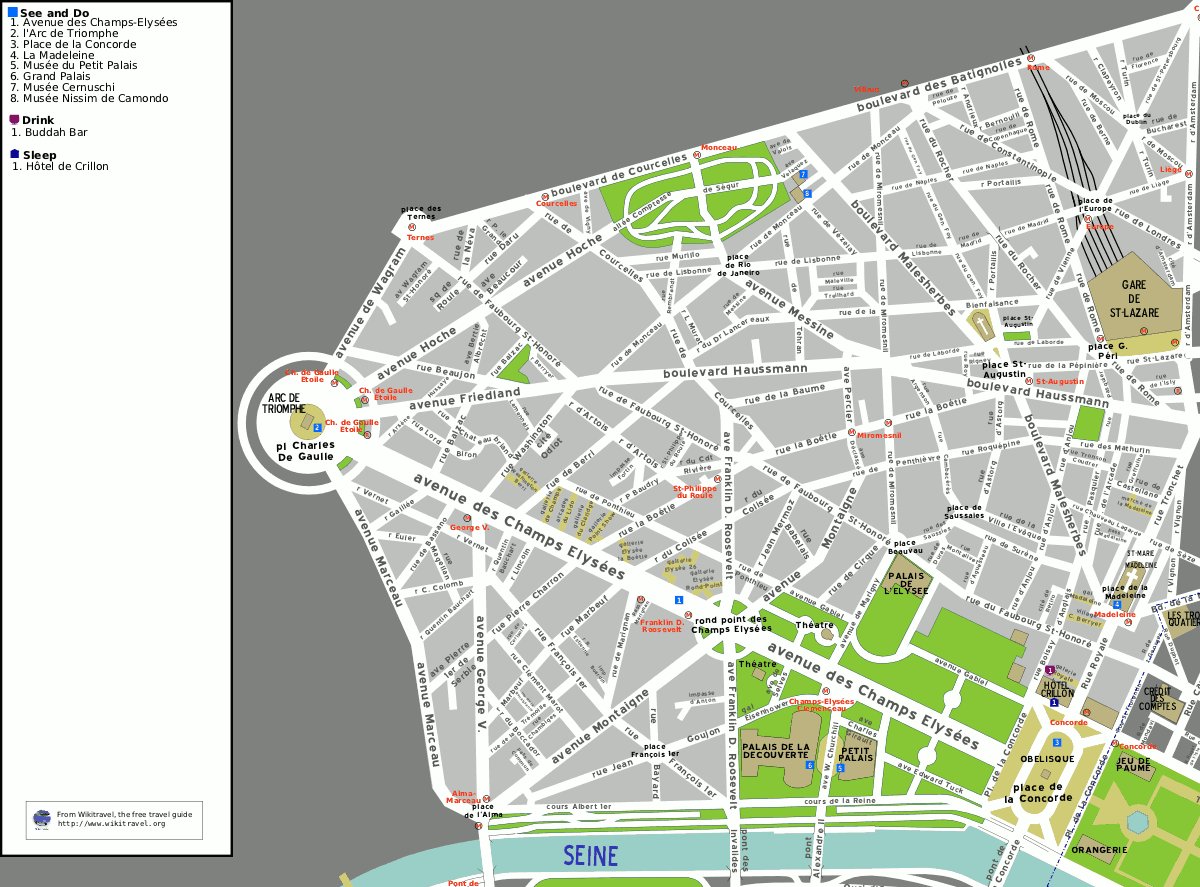
Map of the 8th arrondissement

== Economy ==
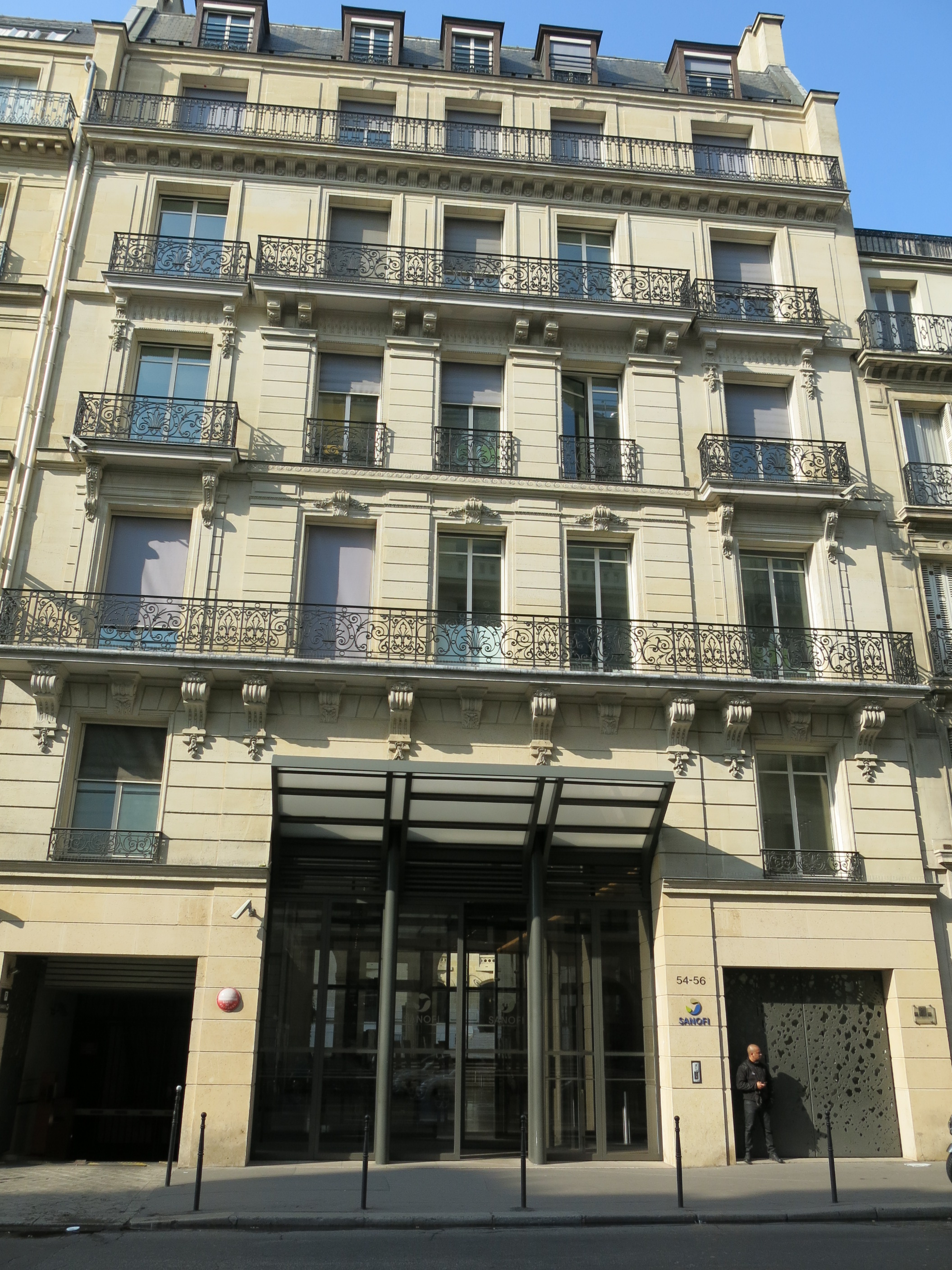
Former Alcatel-Lucent head office

The head offices of Axa, Bouygues, Électricité de France (EDF), Eurazeo, Ki-oon, Sanofi, Engie, HSBC Continental Europe and Suez Environnement are located in this arrondissement. Standard & Poor's' France office is located in the 8th arrondissement. Air China and China Southern Airlines have their Paris offices in the arrondissement.

At one time, the head office of Union de Transports Aériens was located in this arrondissement. The predecessor airline, Union Aéromaritime de Transport, also had its head office in the 8th arrondissement. When Suez existed, its head office was in the 8th arrondissement. When Unibail existed, its head office was in the 8th arrondissement. At one time, Groupe Danone had its head office in the 8th arrondissement. At one time, Alcatel-Lucent's head office was located in the 8th arrondissement. At one time, Northwest Airlines had its Paris offices in the Madeleine station. At one time, All Nippon Airways operated a sales office in the 8th arrondissement.

== Cityscape ==
=== Districts or neighborhoods ===
The neighborhoods of the 8th arrondissement

- Quartier des Champs-Élysées (29)
- Quartier du Faubourg-du-Roule (30)
- Quartier de la Madeleine (31)
- Quartier de l'Europe (32)

=== Places of interest ===
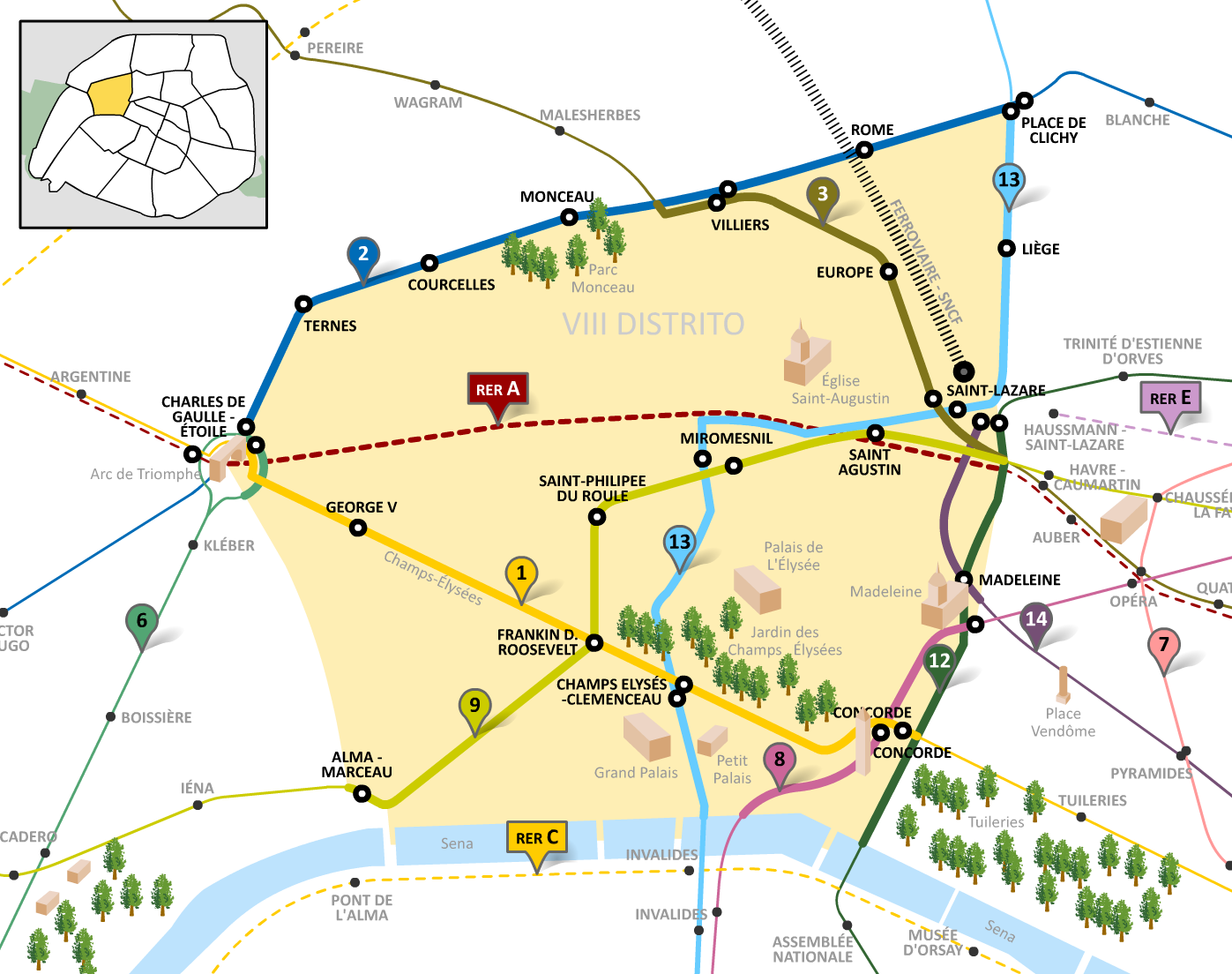

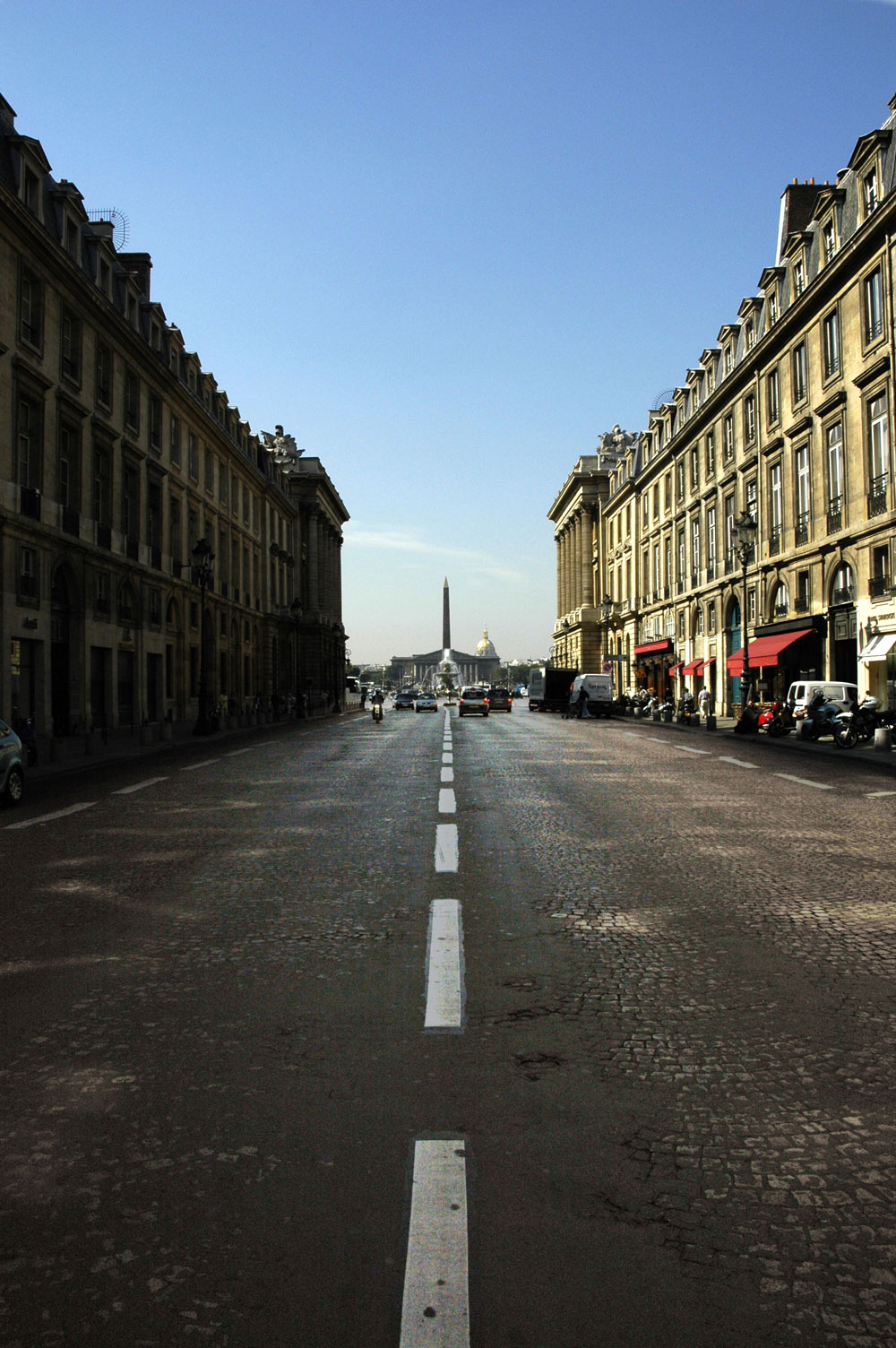
Rue Royale, from the Place de la Madeleine to the place de la Concorde in the 8th arrondissement

- Alexander Nevsky Cathedral, Paris
- American Cathedral in Paris
- Arc de Triomphe (one-third, shared with 16th and 17th arrondissements)
- Automobile Club de France
- Avenue des Champs-Élysées
- Chapelle Expiatoire
- Chapel of Notre-Dame-de-La-Consolation, Paris
- Église de la Madeleine
- Église Saint-Augustin
- Élysée Palace
- Four Seasons Hotel George V
- Gare Saint-Lazare
- Grand Palais
- Hôtel de Crillon
- Hôtel de Marigny
- Hôtel de la Marine
- Royal Monceau
- Lycée Chaptal
- Maxim's Art Nouveau "Collection 1900"
- Musée Cernuschi
- Musée Bouilhet-Christofle
- Musée Jacquemart-André
- Musée Nissim de Camondo
- The Obelisk (Obélisque) in the Place de la Concorde
- Pagoda Paris
- Palais de la Découverte
- Parc Monceau
- Petit Palais
- Pinacothèque de Paris
- Place de la Concorde
- Pont Alexandre III
- Pont de l'Alma
- Pont de la Concorde
- Pont des Invalides
- Salle Gaveau
- The Scots Kirk (l'Église écossaise de Paris)
- Théâtre des Champs-Élysées

=== Streets and squares ===
==== Streets ====
- Allée de la Comtesse-de-Ségur
- Allée Marcel-Proust
- Arcades des Champs-Élysées
- Avenue Beaucour
- Avenue Bertie-Albrecht
- Avenue César-Caire
- Avenue des Champs-Élysées
- Avenue Charles-Girault
- Avenue Delcassé
- Avenue Dutuit
- Avenue Edward-Tuck
- Avenue Ferdousi
- Avenue Franklin-D.-Roosevelt
- Avenue de Friedland
- Avenue Gabriel
- Avenue du Général-Eisenhower
- Avenue George-V
- Avenue Hoche
- Avenue Marceau
- Avenue de Marigny
- Avenue Matignon
- Avenue de Messine
- Avenue Montaigne
- Avenue Myron-T.-Herrick
- Avenue Percier
- Avenue Pierre-Ier-de-Serbie
- Avenue du Président-Wilson
- Avenue Ruysdaël
- Cité Odiot
- Avenue de Selves
- Avenue de Valois
- Avenue Van-Dyck
- Avenue Vélasquez
- Avenue de Wagram
- Avenue Winston-Churchill
- Boulevard des Batignolles
- Boulevard de Courcelles
- Boulevard Haussmann
- Boulevard de la Madeleine
- Boulevard Malesherbes
- Champs-Élysées
- Cité Berryer
- Cité du Retiro
- Cours Albert-Ier
- Cour du Havre
- Cour de l'Horloge
- Cours la Reine
- Cour de Rome
- Galerie de la Madeleine
- Impasse d'Amsterdam
- Impasse d'Antin
- Impasse Bourdin
- Impasse Dany
- Impasse du Docteur-
  Jacques-Bertillon
- Impasse Fortin
- Impasse Ruffin
- Passage de la Madeleine
- Passage Marignan
- Passage Puteaux
- Passage Saint-Philippe-
  du-Roule
- Rond-point des Champs-
  Élysées-Marcel-Dassault
- Rue Pierre Charron
- Rue d'Aguesseau
- Rue Alfred-de-Vigny
- Rue d'Amsterdam
- Rue Andrieux
- Rue d'Anjou
- Rue de l'Arcade
- Rue d'Argenson
- Rue Arsène-Houssaye
- Rue d'Artois
- Rue d'Astorg
- Rue Balzac
- Rue de Bassano
- Rue Bayard
- Rue Beaujon
- Rue de Berne
- Rue Bernoulli
- Rue de Berri
- Rue Berryer
- Rue de la Bienfaisance
- Rue du Boccador
- Rue Boissy-d'Anglas
- Rue de Bucarest
- Rue Cambacérès
- Rue de Castellane
- Rue de Cérisoles
- Rue Chambiges
- Rue Chateaubriand
- Rue Chauveau-Lagarde
- Rue du Chevalier-
  de-Saint-George
- Rue Christophe-Colomb
- Rue du Cirque
- Rue Clapeyron
- Rue Clément-Marot
- Rue du Colisée
- Rue du Commandant-Rivière
- Rue de Constantinople
- Rue de Copenhague
- Rue Corvetto
- Rue de Courcelles
- Rue Daru
- Rue du Docteur Lancereaux
- Rue Duphot
- Rue de Duras
- Rue d'Édimbourg
- Rue de l'Élysée
- Rue Euler
- Rue du Faubourg-Saint-Honoré
- Rue François-Ier
- Rue de Florence
- Rue Frédéric-Bastiat
- Rue Galilée
- Rue du Général-Foy
- Rue Greffulhe
- Rue du Havre
- Rue Intérieure
- Rue de l'Isly
- Rue Jean-Goujon
- Rue Jean-Mermoz
- Rue Joseph-Sansbœuf
- Rue de La Baume
- Rue La Boétie
- Rue de Laborde
- Rue Lamennais
- Rue Larribe
- Rue de La Trémoille
- Rue Lavoisier
- Rue de Liège
- Rue Lincoln
- Rue de Lisbonne
- Rue de Londres
- Rue Lord-Byron
- Rue Louis-Murat
- Rue de Madrid
- Rue Magellan
- Rue Maleville
- Rue Marbeuf
- Rue de Marignan
- Rue des Mathurins
- Rue de Messine
- Rue de Miromesnil
- Rue Mollien
- Rue de Monceau
- Rue Montalivet
- Rue de Moscou
- Rue Murillo
- Rue de Naples
- Rue de la Néva
- Rue Pasquier
- Rue Paul-Baudry
- Rue Paul-Cézanne
- Rue Pelouze
- Rue de Penthièvre
- Rue de la Pépinière
- Rue Pierre-Charron
- Rue Pierre-Le-Grand
- Rue de Ponthieu
- Rue Portalis
- Rue de Presbourg
- Rue de Provence
- Rue Quentin-Bauchart
- Rue Rabelais
- Rue Rembrandt
- Rue de la Renaissance
- Rue de Rigny
- Rue Robert-Estienne
- Rue du Rocher
- Rue de Rome
- Rue Roquépine
- Rue Roy
- Rue Royale
- Rue Saint-Florentin
- Rue Saint-Honoré
- Rue Saint-Lazare
- Rue Saint-Philippe-du-Roule
- Rue de Saint-Pétersbourg
- Rue des Saussaies
- Rue de Sèze
- Rue de Stockholm
- Rue de Surène
- Rue de Téhéran
- Rue de Tilsitt
- Rue Treilhard
- Rue Tronchet
- Rue Tronson-du-Coudray
- Rue de Turin
- Rue Vernet
- Rue de Vézelay
- Rue de Vienne
- Rue Vignon
- Rue de la Ville-l'Évêque
- Rue Washington
- Villa Nouvelle
- Villa Wagram-Saint-Honoré
- Voie Georges-Pompidou

==== Squares ====
- Parc Monceau
- Place de l'Alma
- Place Beauvau
- Place de Budapest
- Place du Canada
- Place Charles de Gaulle
- Place Chassaigne-Goyon
- Place Clemenceau
- Place de Clichy
- Place de la Concorde
- Place de Dublin
- Place de l'Étoile
- Place de l'Europe
- Place François-Ier
- Place Gabriel-Péri
- Place du Général-Brocard
- Place Georges-Guillaumin
- Place du Guatémala
- Place du Havre
- Place Henri-Bergson
- Place Henry-Dunant
- Place du Havre
- Place Jean-Pierre-Lévy
- Place de la Madeleine
- Place de Narvik
- Place du Pérou
- Place Prosper-Goubaux
- Place de la Reine-Astrid
- Place de la République-de-l'Équateur
- Place de la République-Dominicaine
- Place de Rio-de-Janeiro
- Place Saint-Augustin
- Place des Saussaies
- Place des Ternes
- Rond-point des Champs-Élysées-Marcel-Dassault
- Square Beaujon
- Square de Berlin
- Square de la Fondation Rothschild
- Square Jean-Perrin
- Square Louis XVI
- Square Marcel-Pagnol
- Square du Roule

== Education ==
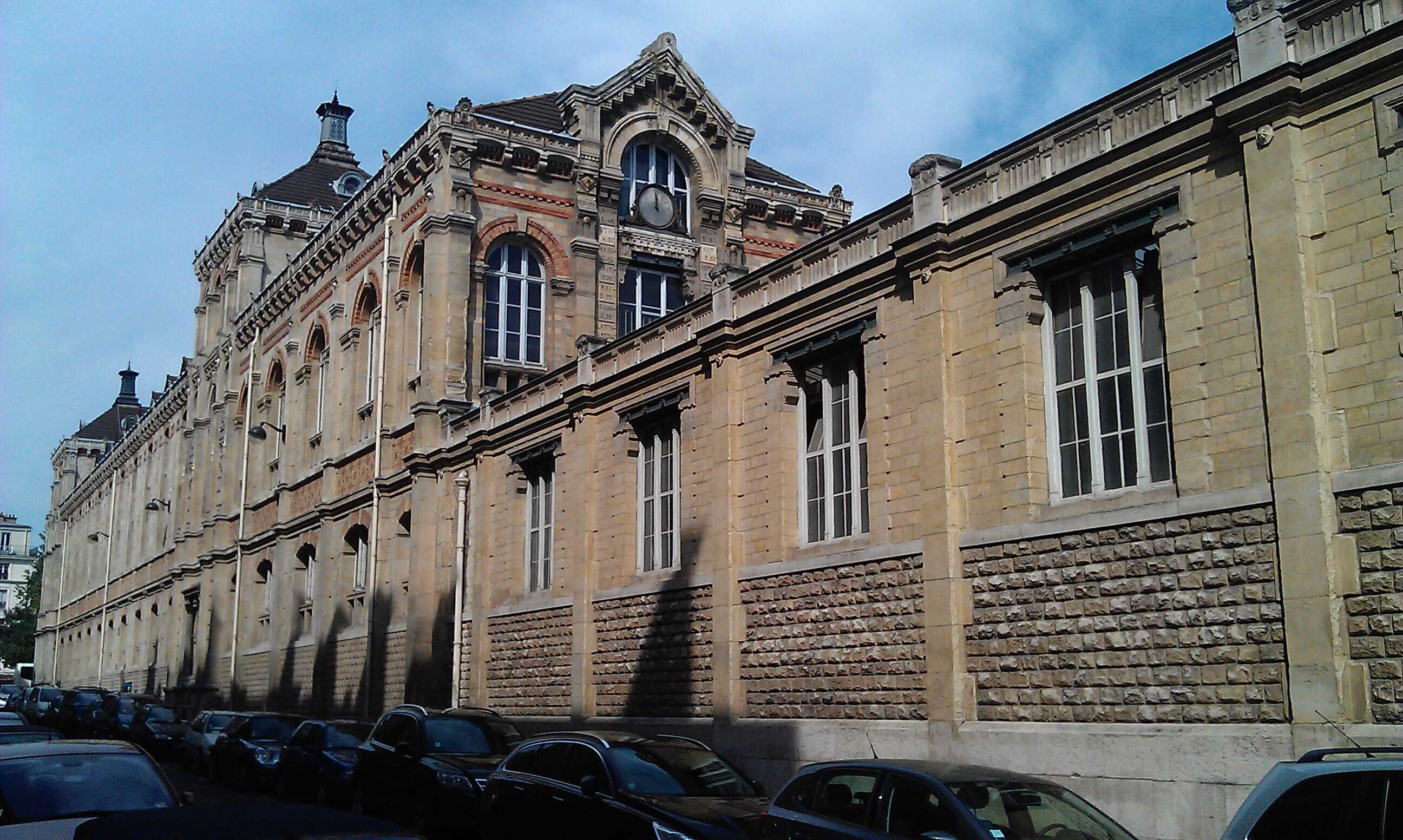
Lycée général et technologique Chaptal

There are two public sixth-form colleges (lycée) in the 8th arrondissement: Lycée Chaptal and Lycée Racine.

Private high schools:

- Cours Hattemer
- Lycée Fénelon Sainte-Marie

The École de langue japonaise de Paris (パリ日本語補習校 Pari Nihongo Hoshūkō), a supplementary Japanese education programme, has its offices at the Association Amicale des Ressortissants Japonais en France (AARJF) in the 8th arrondissement. The classes are held at the École Maternelle et Primaire Saint Francois d'Eylau in the 16th arrondissement.

Intégrale : Institut d'enseignement supérieur privé has one of its campuses in the 8th arrondissement.

Harvard Business School's Europe Research Centre is located in rue Francois 1er.
