= Chaussée d'Antin–La Fayette station =

Metro station in Paris, France

Chaussée d'Antin–La Fayette
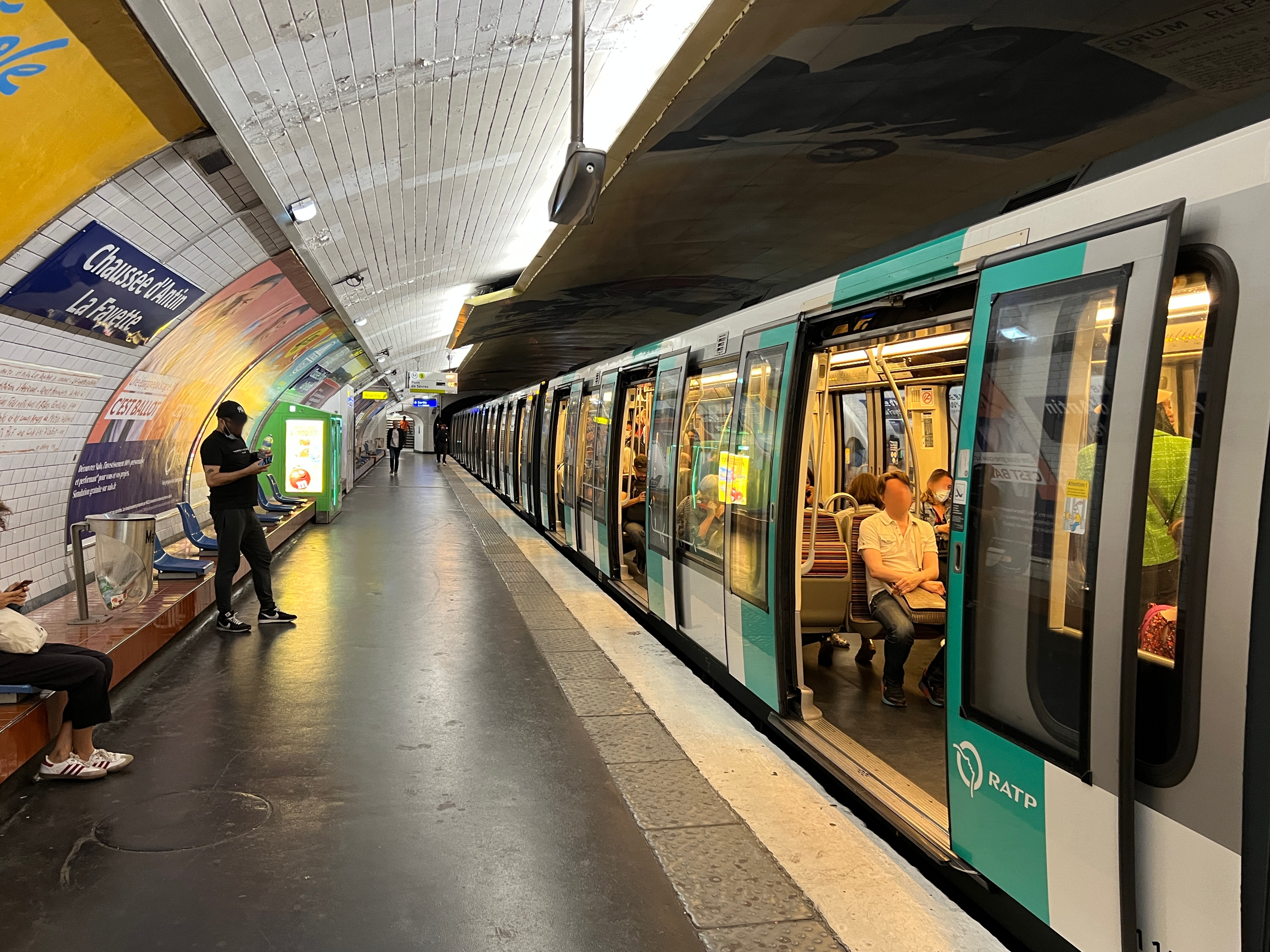
- Line 9 platforms

General information
- Location: 9th arrondissement of Paris; Île-de-France; France
- Coordinates: 48°52′23″N 2°20′02″E
- System: Paris Métro station
- Owner: RATP
- Operator: RATP
- Line: Paris Metro Paris Metro Line 7 Paris Metro Line 9
- Platforms: 4 (side platforms)
- Tracks: 4

Construction
- Accessible: no

Other information
- Fare zone: 1

History
- Opened: 5 November 1910; 115 years ago
- Former names: Chaussée d'Antin (1910–1989)

Services
Preceding station	Paris Metro	Following station
Opéra towards Villejuif–Louis Aragon or Mairie d'Ivry	Line 7	Le Peletier towards La Courneuve–8 mai 1945
Havre–Caumartin towards Pont de Sèvres	Line 9	Richelieu–Drouot towards Mairie de Montreuil
Location
- Location within Paris

Chaussée d'Antin–La Fayette (French pronunciation: [ʃose dɑ̃tɛ̃ la fajɛt]) is a station on Lines 7 and 9 of the Paris Métro. Located in the 9th arrondissement, it opened on 5 November 1910 with the opening of the first section of Line 7 from Opéra to Porte de la Villette. The Line 9 platforms opened on 3 June 1923 with the extension of the line from Saint-Augustin.

== History ==
The station was originally named Chaussée d'Antin after the Rue de la Chaussée-d'Antin—which was named by Louis Antoine de Pardaillan de Gondrin, first Duke of Antin (1665–1736) in 1712 after himself. In 1989 "La Fayette" was added to the station name, referring to Rue La Fayette, a famous shopping street named after Gilbert du Motier, marquis de Lafayette. The main Galeries Lafayette department store on Boulevard Haussmann is nearby.

The area was once a marsh to the north of the old Porte Gaillon (a gate in the extension of Paris's walls, built under Louis XIII). Louis XV's frequent visits to Paris led to the building in the area of several splendid residences, including a mansion by the King's Superintendent of Buildings Louis Antoine de Pardaillan de Gondrin, Duke of Antin, son of Madame de Montespan (later a long-time mistress to Louis XIV) and Louis Henri Pardaillan de Gondrin, marquis de Montespan.

It was the northeastern terminus of Line 9 (from Exelmans) from 3 June 1923 to 30 June 1928, when it was extended by one station to Richelieu–Drouot.

In April 2012, a driver mistakenly drove his car into a station entrance, thinking it was an underground car park.

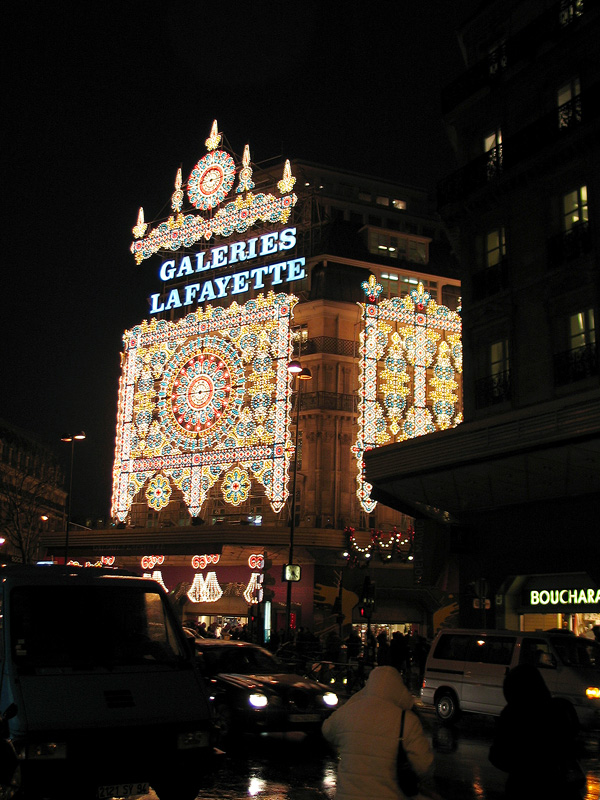
Galeries Lafayette, Christmas 2004

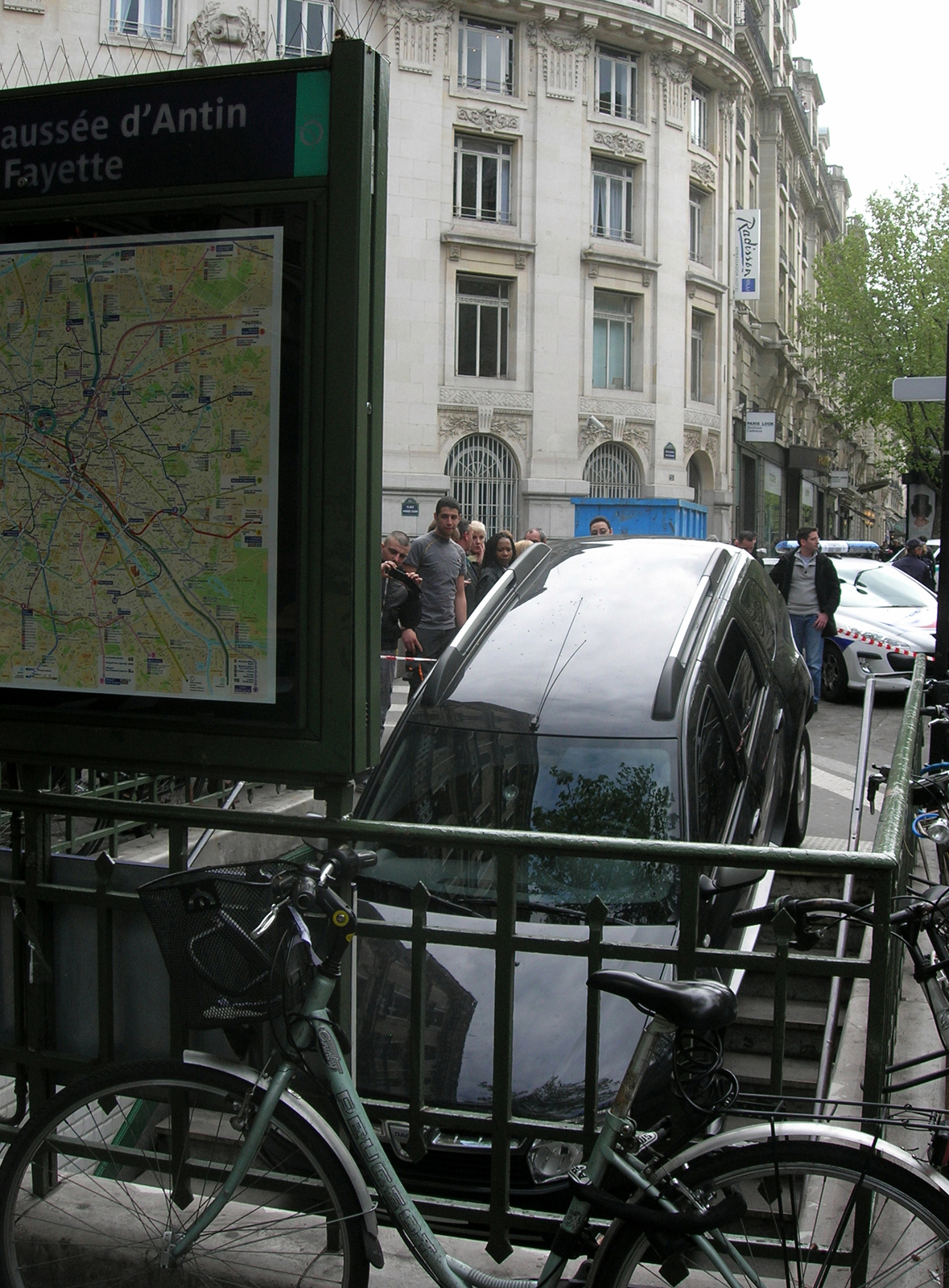
The 2012 accident

== Passenger services ==
=== Access ===
The station has six accesses divided into seven entrances:

- access 1 - Grands magasins - Galeries Lafayette, consisting of a fixed staircase decorated with a Dervaux candelabra, leading to the corner of Boulevard Haussmann and the Rue de la Chaussée-d'Antin, to the right of the Galeries Lafayette Haussmann;
- access 2 - Rue La Fayette, consisting of a fixed staircase, located at the corner of the Rue de la Chaussée-d'Antin and Rue La Fayette;
- access 3 - Rue Halévy, also consisting of a fixed staircase with a Dervaux mast, located opposite no. 29 Boulevard Haussmann, west of the corner with Rue Halévy;
- access 4 - Boulevard Haussmann, consisting of two entrances leading to the right of nos. 36 and 36 bis of Boulevard Haussmann, the first, consisting of a fixed staircase doubled by an escalator going up, equipped with a Dervaux totem pole while the second, consisting of a fixed staircase, had in the past, a Guimard aedicule;
- access 5 - Rue de la Chaussée-d'Antin, equipped with a Dervaux lamppost, facing no. 23 bis of Boulevard Haussmann, at the corner with the Rue de la Chaussée-d'Antin;
- access 6 - Rue Taitbout, is located to the right of no. 28 Boulevard Haussmann, opposite Place Adrien-Oudin.

=== Station layout ===
G	Street Level	Exit/Entrance
B1	Mezzanine	Fare control
B2	Side platform, doors will open on the right
B2	Southbound	← toward Villejuif–Louis Aragon or Mairie d'Ivry (Opéra)
B2	Northbound	toward La Courneuve–8 mai 1945 (Le Peletier) →
B2	Side platform, doors will open on the right
B3	Side platform, doors will open on the right
B3	Westbound	← toward Pont de Sèvres (Havre–Caumartin)
B3	Eastbound	toward Mairie de Montreuil (Richelieu–Drouot) →
B3	Side platform, doors will open on the right

=== Platforms ===
The platforms of the two lines, with a conventional length of seventy-five metres, are of standard configuration. There are two per stopping point, they are separated by the metro tracks located in the centre and the vault is elliptical. Each of the vaults is decorated with a painted sheet metal fresco, created by the French painter Jean-Paul Chambas in 1989, on the bicentenary of the French Revolution.

On Line 7, this station is completed with an Andreu-Motte style decoration with two blue light canopies with the particularity of being topped with an additional lighting device to highlight the fresco, as well as benches covered with flat blue tiles and equipped with Motte seats of the same colour. Before 2020, the barriers surrounding the stair shafts on the platform towards La Courneuve–8 mai 1945 were also painted blue to harmonise with the decoration while respecting its colorimetric uniformity. These fittings are themselves combined with the flat white ceramic tiles that cover the walls and tunnel exits. The advertising frames are metal, and the name of the station is inscribed in Parisine font on enamelled plaques. The station is however distinguished by the lower part of the platform walls towards La Courneuve, which is vertical and not elliptical for most of its length, due to the presence of the numerous stair shafts. The name plates are thus arranged in a protruding manner on the curvature at the base of the vault.

On Line 9, the station is accompanied by lighter Mott style fittings. The platforms have benches covered with flat brown tiles and topped with blue Motte seats (which replace white seats of the same model). There are no light canopies as is usual in stations of this style, the platforms only having indirect lighting provided by the lights hidden on the sides of the fresco, previously illuminated by projectors. As on Line 7, the white ceramic tiles are flat and cover the walls and tunnel exits. The advertising frames are metal and the name of the station, written with the Parisine font, appeared on backlit boxes until July 2022, but have since been replaced by classic enamelled plaques.

=== Bus connections ===
The station is served by lines 32, 45 and 68 (for the latter, in the direction of Châtillon–Montrouge only) of the RATP Bus Network.

== Gallery ==
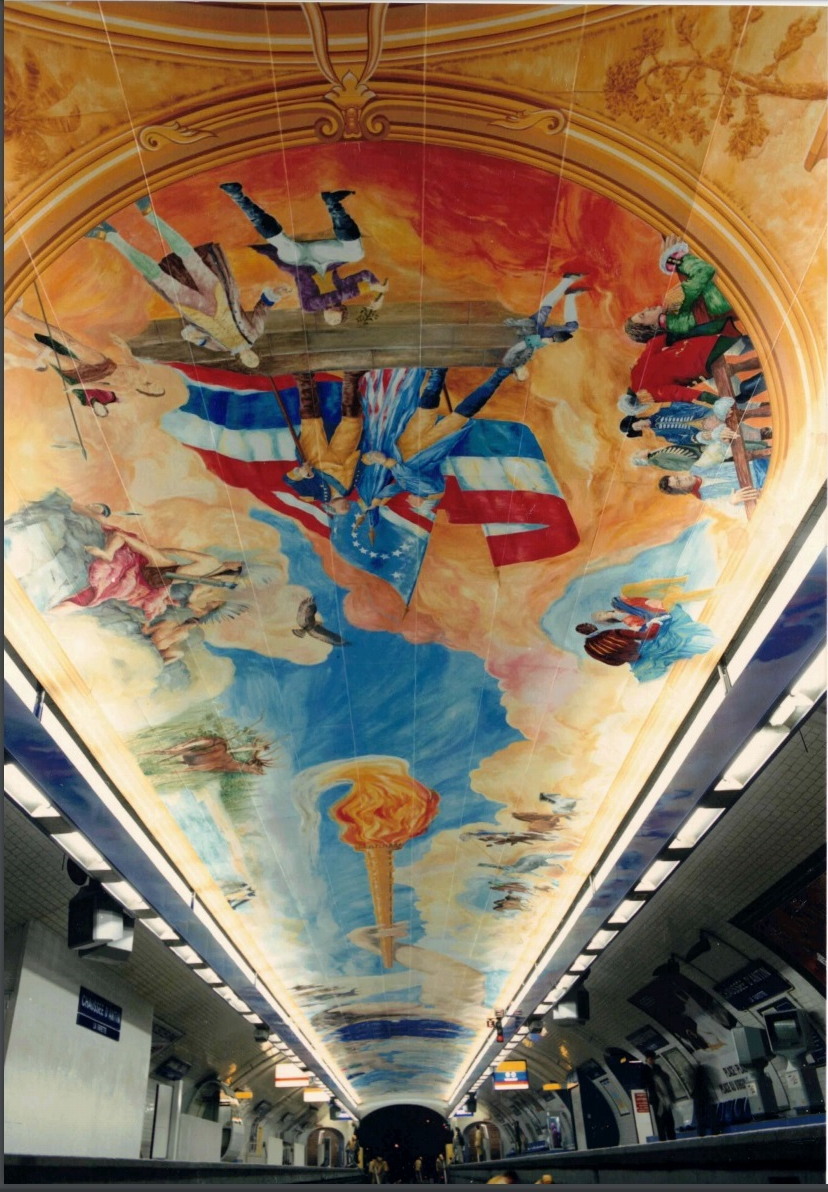
Line 7 ceiling decoration

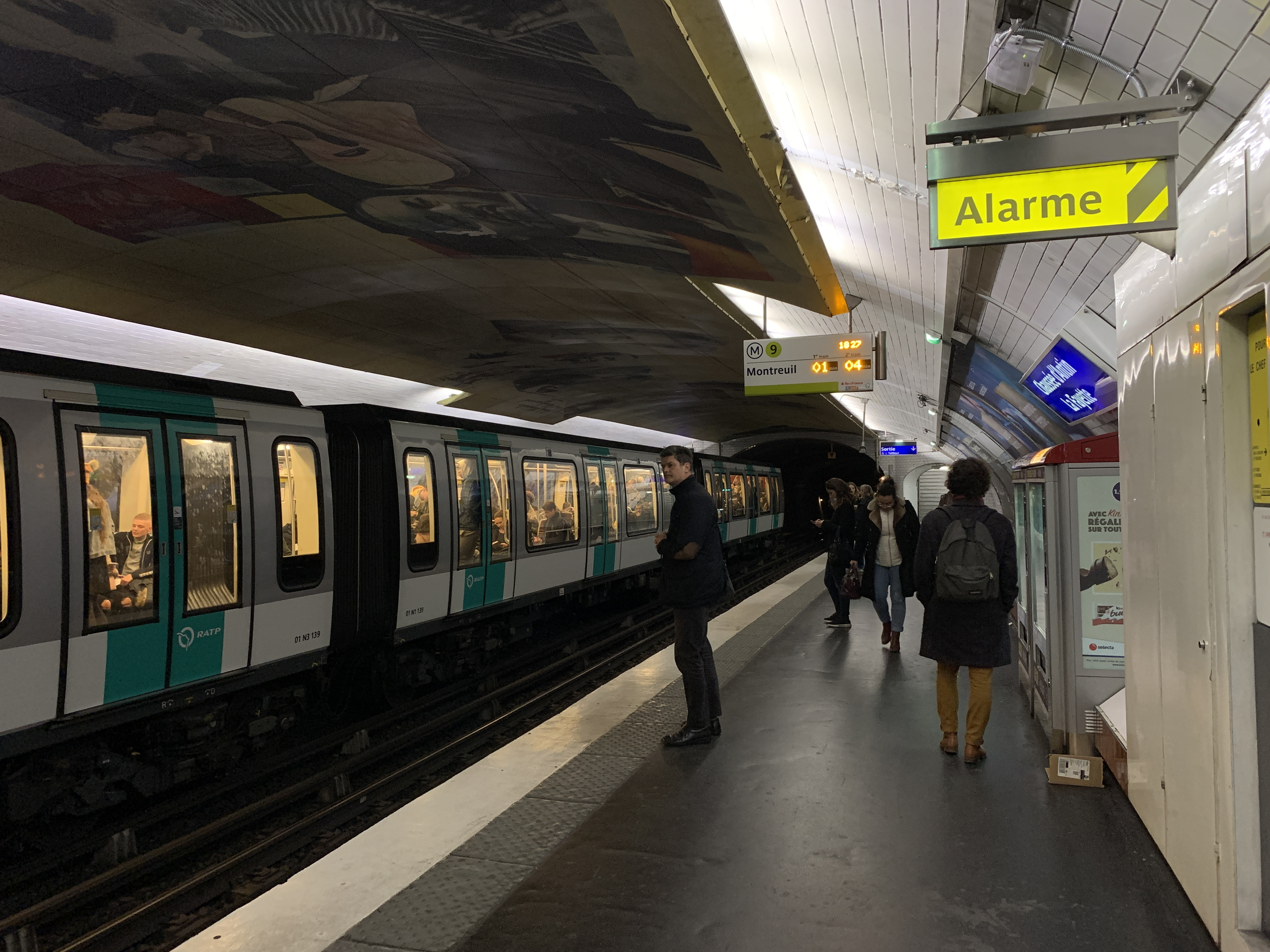
Line 9 platforms in 2019

== Sources ==
- Roland, Gérard (2003). Stations de métro. D'Abbesses à Wagram. Éditions Bonneton.
