= Opéra station (Paris Metro) =

Metro station in Paris, France

Opéra
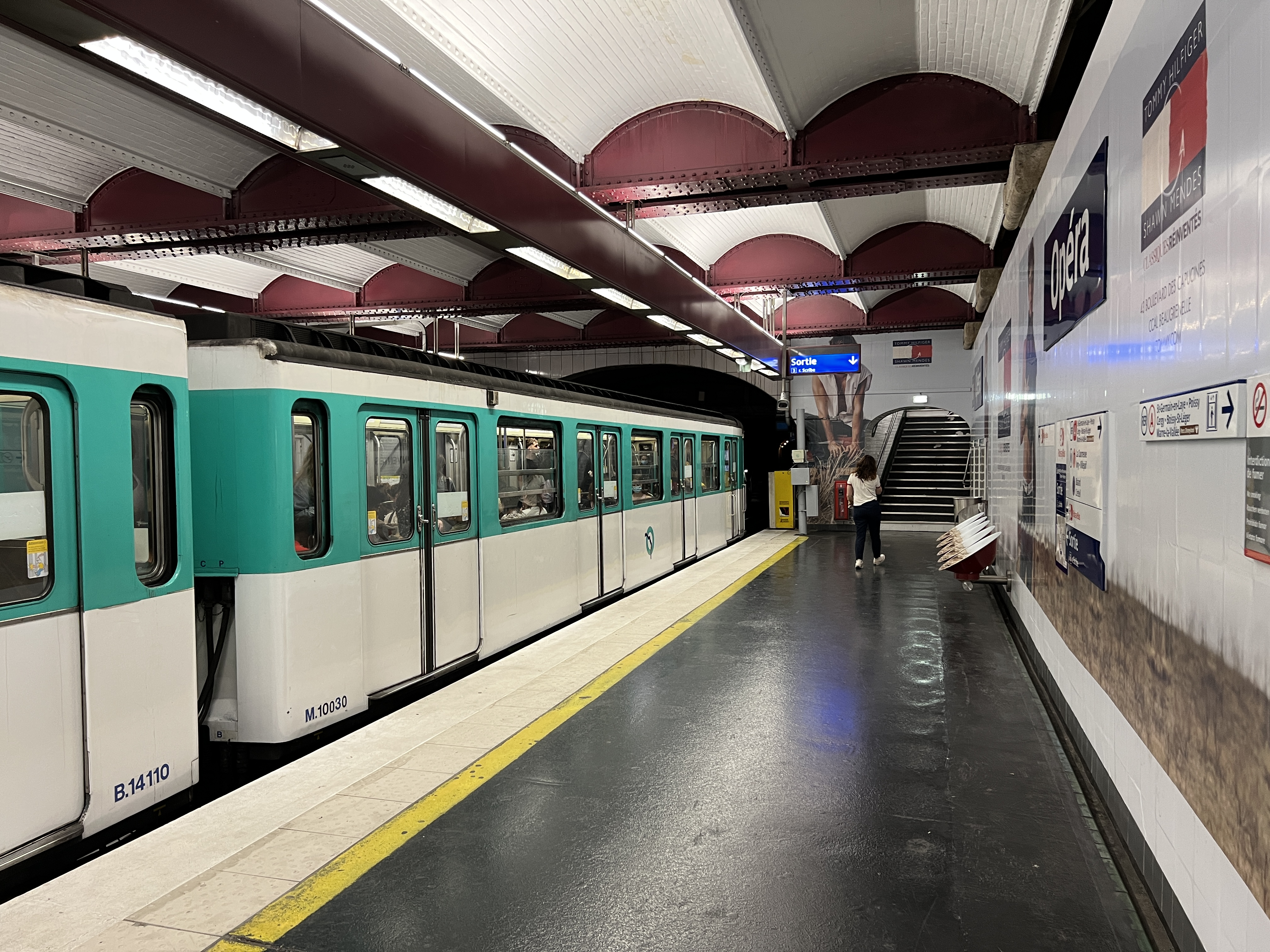
- Line 3 platforms

General information
- Location: Pl. de l'Opéra (two); 6, Rue Scribe; 43, Av. de l'Opéra; 2nd arrondissement of Paris; Île-de-France; France
- Coordinates: 48°52′14″N 2°19′56″E
- Owner: RATP
- Operator: RATP

Other information
- Fare zone: 1

History
- Opened: 19 October 1904; 121 years ago

Services
Preceding station	Paris Metro	Following station
Havre–Caumartin towards Pont de Levallois–Bécon	Line 3	Quatre-Septembre towards Gallieni
Pyramides towards Villejuif–Louis Aragon or Mairie d'Ivry	Line 7	Chaussée d'Antin–La Fayette towards La Courneuve–8 mai 1945
Madeleine towards Balard	Line 8	Richelieu–Drouot towards Pointe du Lac
Connections to other stations
Saint-Augustin towards Pont de Sèvres	Line 9 transfer at Havre–Caumartin	Chaussée d'Antin–La Fayette towards Mairie de Montreuil
Madeleine towards Mairie d'Issy	Line 12 transfer at Saint-Lazare	Trinité–d'Estienne d'Orves towards Mairie d'Aubervilliers
Miromesnil towards Châtillon–Montrouge	Line 13 transfer at Saint-Lazare	Liège towards Les Courtilles or Saint-Denis–Université
Pont Cardinet towards Saint-Denis–Pleyel	Line 14 transfer at Saint-Lazare	Madeleine towards Aéroport d'Orly
Preceding station	RER	Following station
Charles de Gaulle–Étoile towards Saint-Germain-en-Laye, Cergy-le-Haut or Poissy	RER A transfer at Auber	Châtelet–Les Halles towards Boissy-Saint-Léger or Marne-la-Vallée–Chessy
Terminus	RER E transfer at Haussmann–Saint-Lazare	Magenta towards Chelles–Gournay or Tournan
Location
- Location within Paris

Opéra (French: [ɔpeʁa]) is a station on Lines 3, 7 and 8 of the Paris Métro. It is named after the nearby Opéra Garnier. Located at the end of the Avenue de l'Opéra, it serves the district of Boulevard Haussmann. Its main entrances are located on the Place de l'Opéra, built in a marble design (instead of the characteristic iron metro entrances of Hector Guimard), to not spoil the view of the opera house.

The station is connected by an underground passage to Auber on RER A. From Auber, additional stations and lines can be reached via a sequence of underground passages, namely Havre–Caumartin for Line 3 and Line 9, and Haussmann–Saint-Lazare for RER E, the latter being connected to Saint-Lazare for Line 3, Line 12, Line 13 and Line 14, and the latter in turn being connected to Saint-Augustin for Line 9.

== Location ==
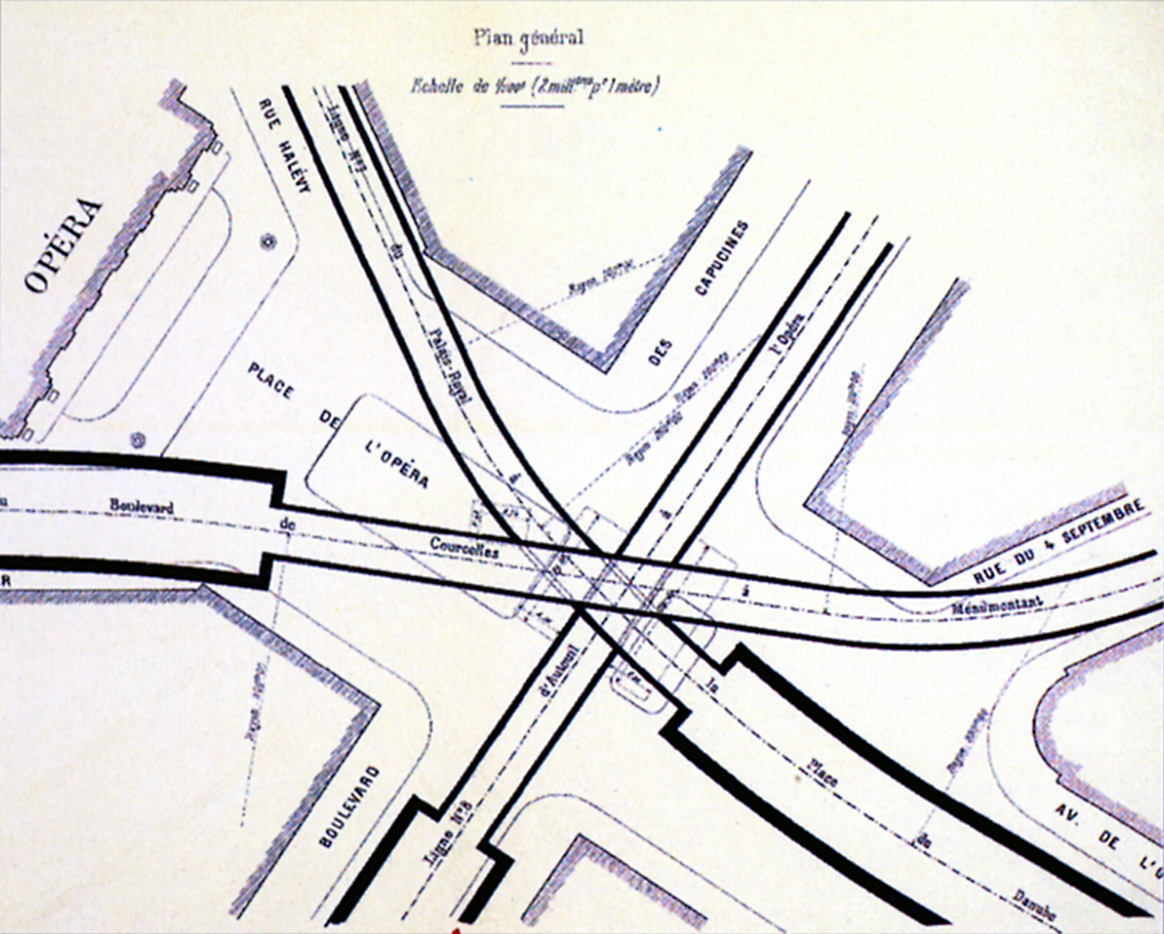
Location of the platforms

The station platforms were established under Rue Auber for line 3; under Avenue de l'Opéra for line 7; and under Boulevard des Capucines for line 8. The platform lie partially under the Place de l'Opéra.

The three lines cross on the levels at the same point, using a common underground structure located under the square.

== History ==
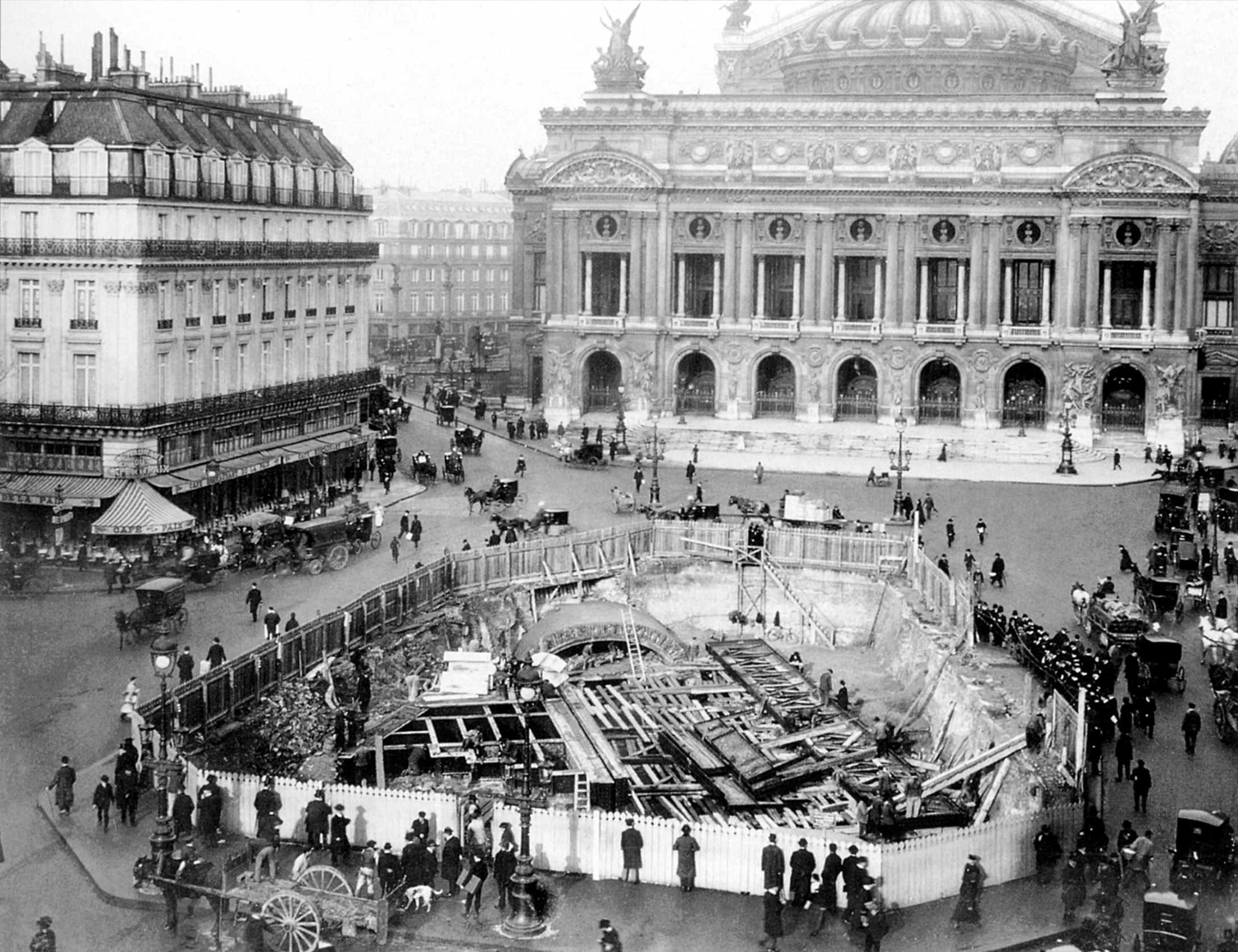
Construction under scaffolding in the Place de l'Opéra. The roof of Line 3 leading to Rue Auber is visible.

The Line 3 platforms opened on 19 October 1904 as part of the first section of the line opened between Père Lachaise and Villiers. A twenty-one metre high masonry well was built to avoid the need for heavy underpinning work when Line 7 and Line 8 were planned to be built. This work was affected by groundwater, which required the support of three concrete pillars, made by sinking caissons with workers digging out the mud with compressed air. The work lasted eleven months, from March 1903 to February 1904. It owes its name to the Garnier opera house, built by the architect Charles Garnier.

The Line 7 platforms opened on 5 November 1910 as part of the first section of the line opened between Opéra and Porte de la Villette. The Line 8 platforms opened on 13 July 1913 as part of the first section of the line opened between Opéra and Beaugrenelle (now Charles Michels station on Line 10) and then on 30 June 1928 when it was extended to Richelieu – Drouot.

From the 1950s to the 1980s, the walls in line 3 were covered with metal bodywork before their renovation in Andreu-Motte style. The platforms of Lines 7 and 8 were modernised from the early 1970s to 2007 in a unique style with three shades of blue (a dark tone for the Motte style seats and the vault and two others lighter shades for small square tiles). The station's name consisted of large raised white capital letters. This decoration, derived from the Mouton-Duvernet style, from which it notably adopted the characteristic lighting canopies, was sometimes nicknamed the "swimming pool". The blue ceiling was then repainted in white to increase the brightness. The entire layout was removed in 2007 when the station was renovated as part of the RATP Renouveau du métro programme. Only the Saint-Lazare station on Lines 12 and 13 had comparable decoration until the mid-2000s.

On 1 April 2016, the RATP replaced one of every two nameplates on the platforms of the three lines to make an April Fool for a day, like twelve other stations. Opera is humorously renamed "Apéro" by anagram.

In 2019, 10,501,357 travellers entered this station which places it at the 15th position of metro stations for its usage.

== Passenger services ==
=== Access ===
The station has three entrances. The two main entrances are on Place de l'Opéra, and the third is on Place Charles-Garnier leading to the platforms of Line 3. An additional exit from the platforms of Line 7, via escalator, is located at No. 43, Avenue de l'Opéra.

=== Station layout ===
Street level		Accesses
B1		Mezzanine for platform connection
Line 3 platforms	Side platform, doors will open on the right
Line 3 platforms	Westbound	← toward Pont de Levallois – Bécon (Havre – Caumartin)
Line 3 platforms	Eastbound	toward Gallieni (Quatre-Septembre) →
Line 3 platforms	Side platform, doors will open on the right

Line 7 platforms	Side platform, doors will open on the right
Line 7 platforms	Southbound	← toward Villejuif – Louis Aragon or Mairie d'Ivry (Pyramides)
Line 7 platforms	Northbound	toward La Courneuve–8 mai 1945 (Chaussée d'Antin – La Fayette) →
Line 7 platforms	Side platform, doors will open on the right

Line 8 platforms	Side platform, doors will open on the right
Line 8 platforms	Westbound	← toward Balard (Madeleine)
Line 8 platforms	Eastbound	toward Pointe du Lac (Richelieu – Drouot) →
Line 8 platforms	Side platform, doors will open on the right

=== Platforms ===
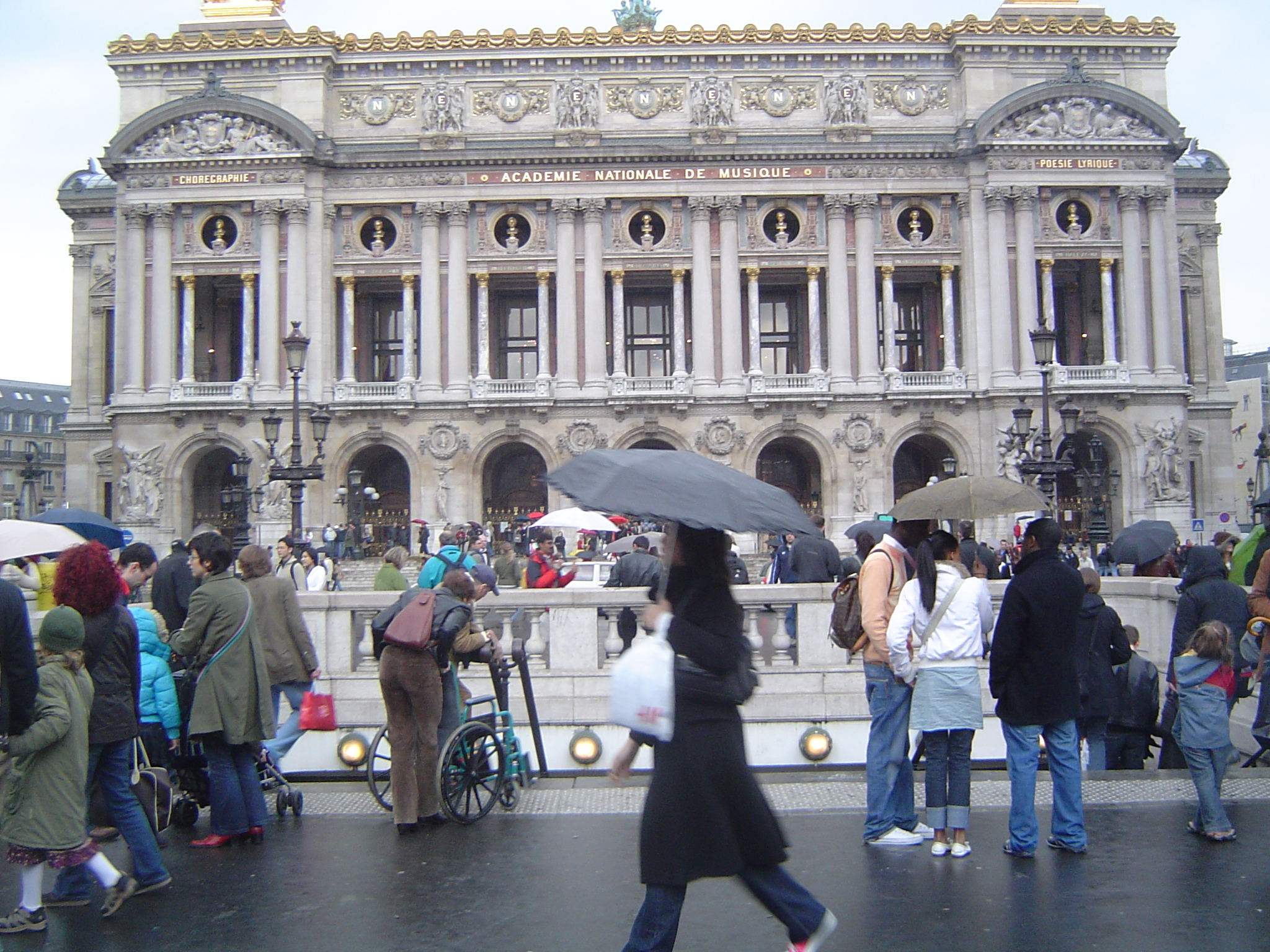
Entrance to the station on Place de l'Opéra.

The platforms of the three lines are of standard configuration. Two in number per stopping point, they are separated by the metro tracks located in the centre.

The platform for Line 3 is established flush with the walls. The ceiling consists of a metal roof, whose beams, burgundy in colour, are supported by vertical pillars. The decoration is in the Andreu-Motte style with two burgundy light canopies, benches, tunnel exits and walls fitted with large white flat tiles in a stretched sandstone and purple Motte seats. On the other hand, the outlets of the corridors are fitted with standard white bevelled tiles. Advertisements are devoid of frames and the name of the station is written in Parisine font on enamelled plates. With Palais Royal – Musée du Louvre on Line 1 and Concorde on line 8, this is one of three stations in the Andreu-Motte style to be treated in shades of purple, this shade being part of the lexicon exceptional colours for this decoration.

The platforms of Lines 7 and 8 have an elliptical vault and are similarly arranged, with a slight extra curve for Line 7, while the platforms of line 8 have a higher of the vault. The style is that used for most metro stations. The lighting canopies are white and rounded in the Gaudin du renouveau du métro des années 2000 renovation, and the bevelled white ceramic tiles cover the walls and the tunnel exits. The vault is painted white. The advertising frames are in white ceramic and the name of the station is written in Parisine font on enamelled plates. The seats are Akiko style, green for line 7 and orange for line 8. As part of the treatment for major permeation, the lighting canopies for line 7 is temporarily removed.

=== Bus connections ===
The station is served by lines 20, 21, 22, 27, 32, 29, 45, 52, 66, 68 and 95 of the RATP Bus Network and, at night, by lines N15 and N16 of the Noctilien network.

== Gallery ==
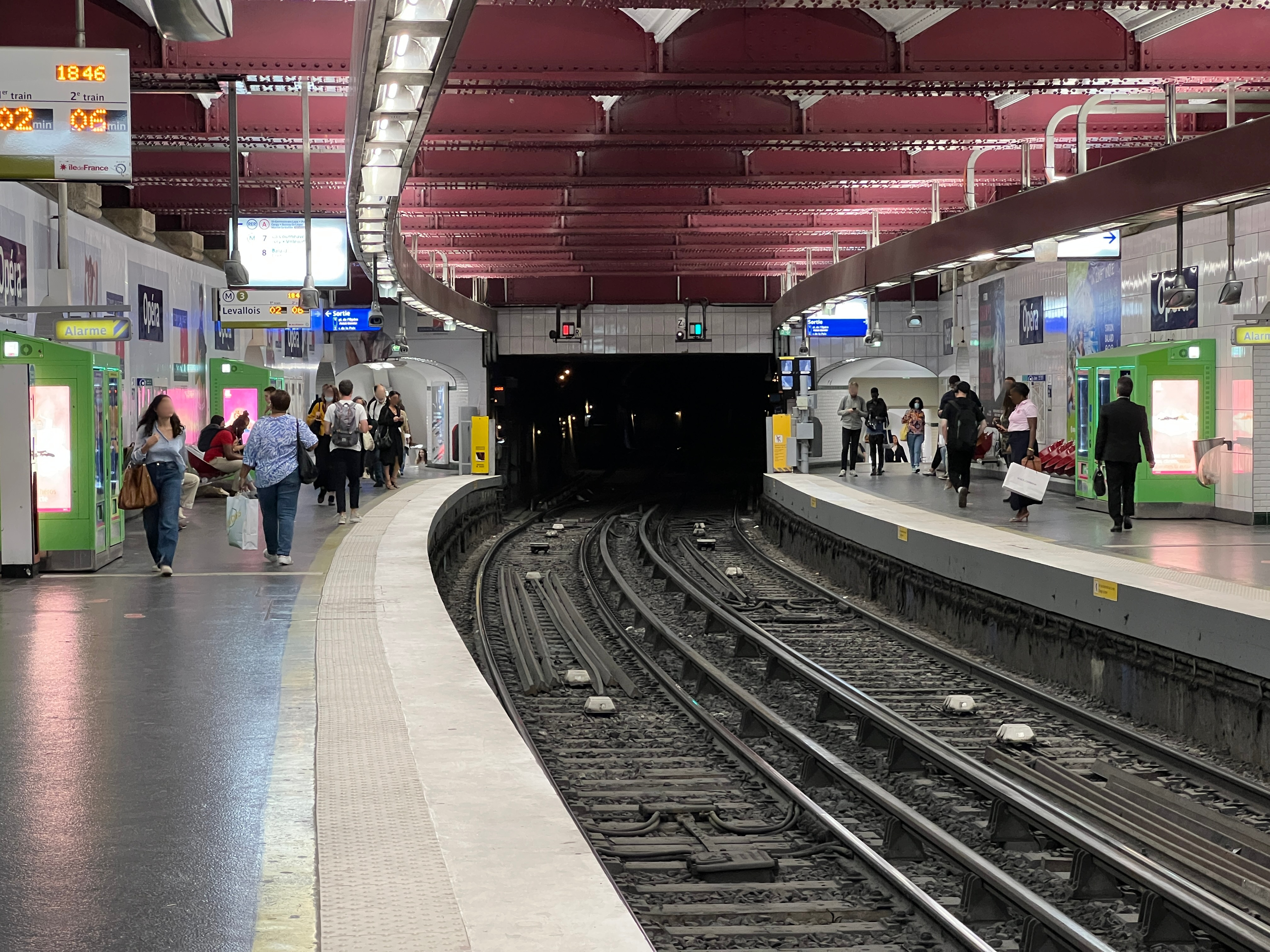
Line 3 platforms at Opéra

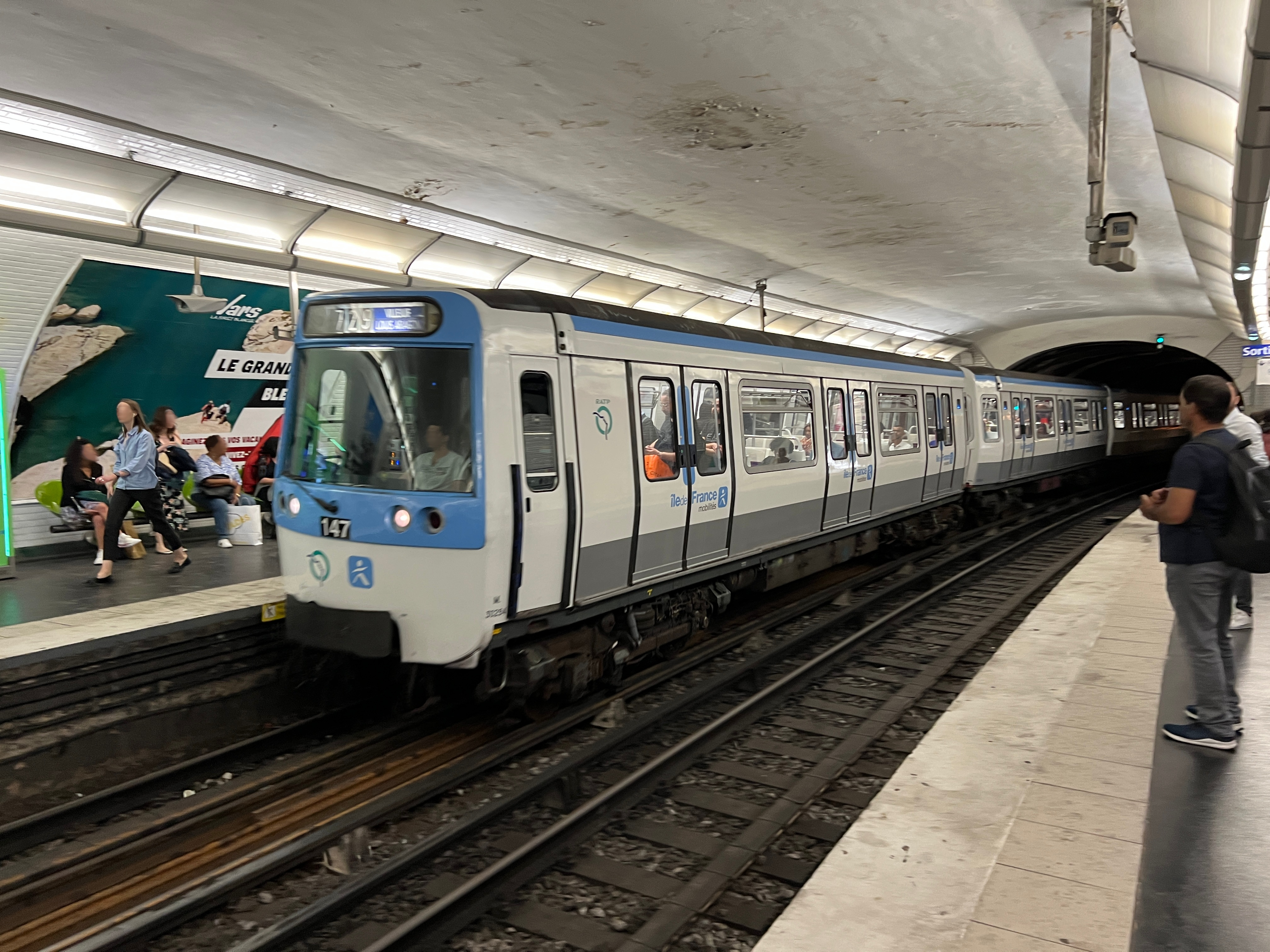
Line 7 platforms at Opéra

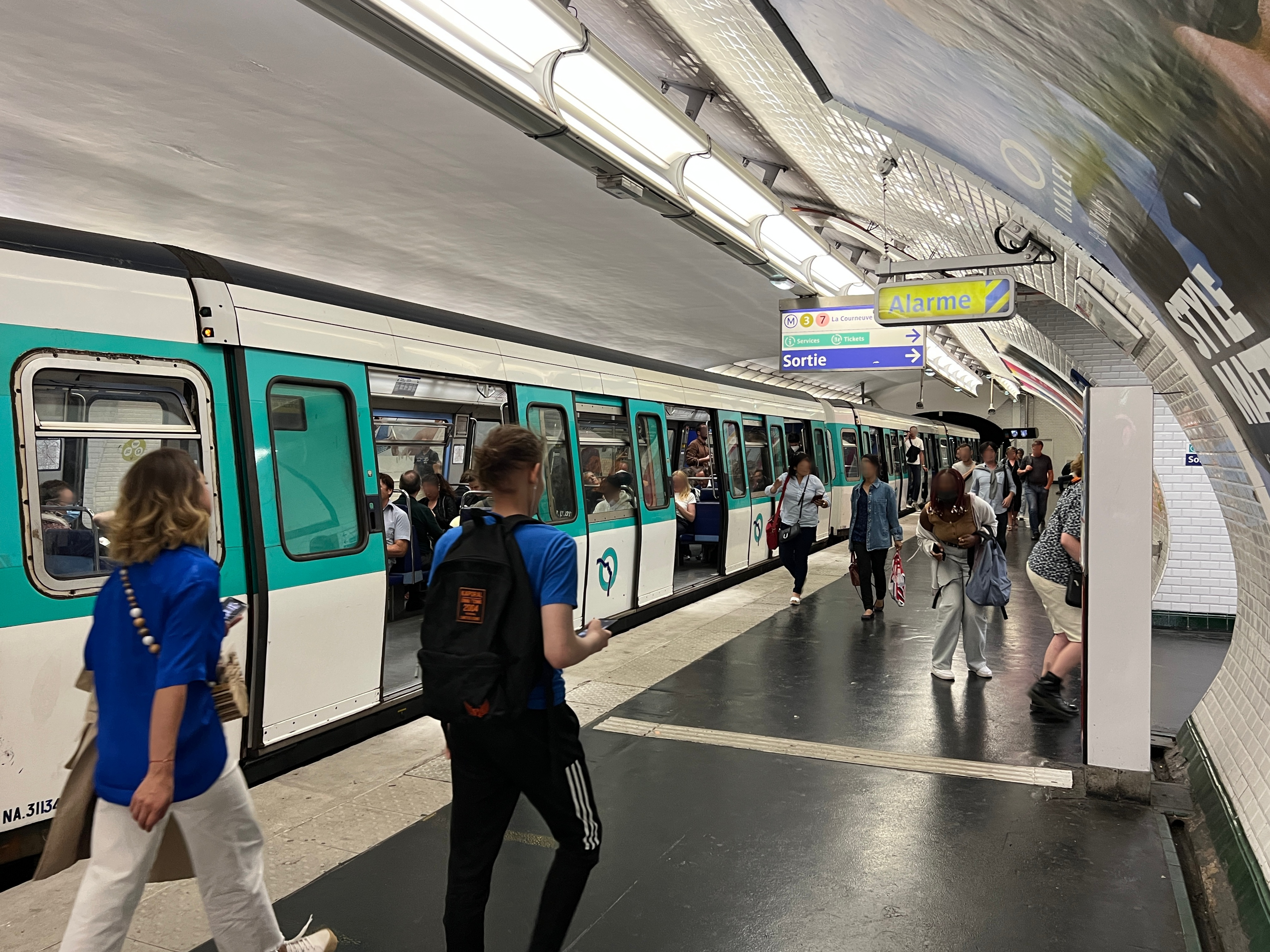
Line 8 platforms at Opéra

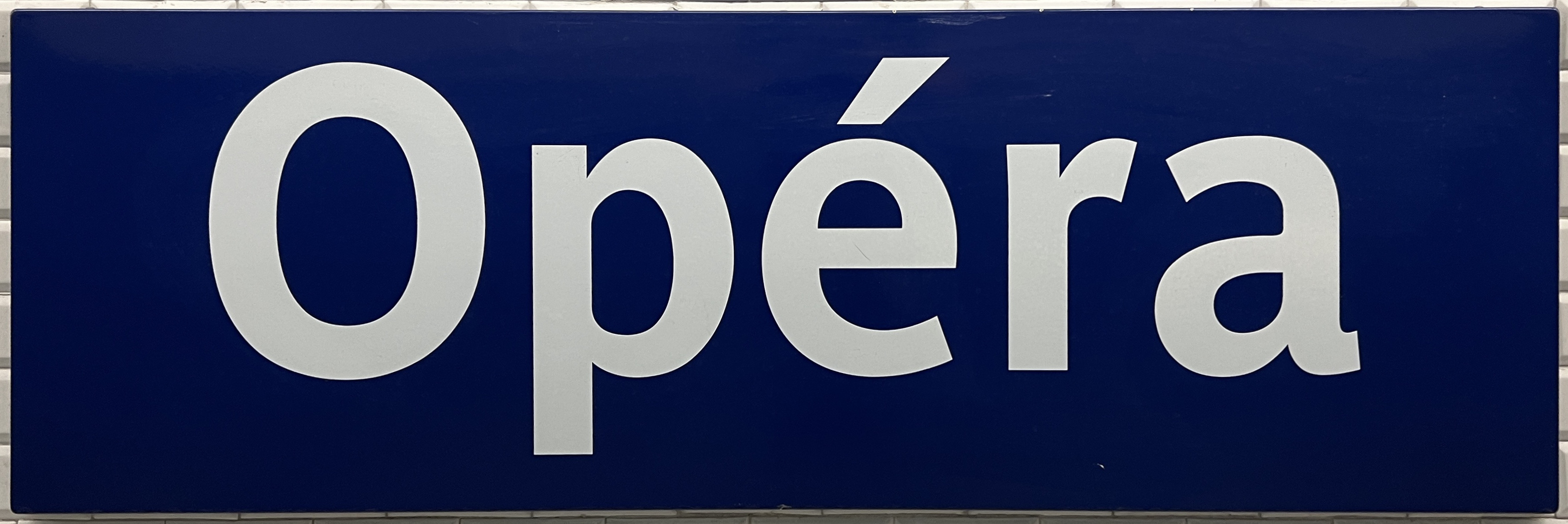
Opéra platform signage
