= Place Beauvau =

Square in Paris, France

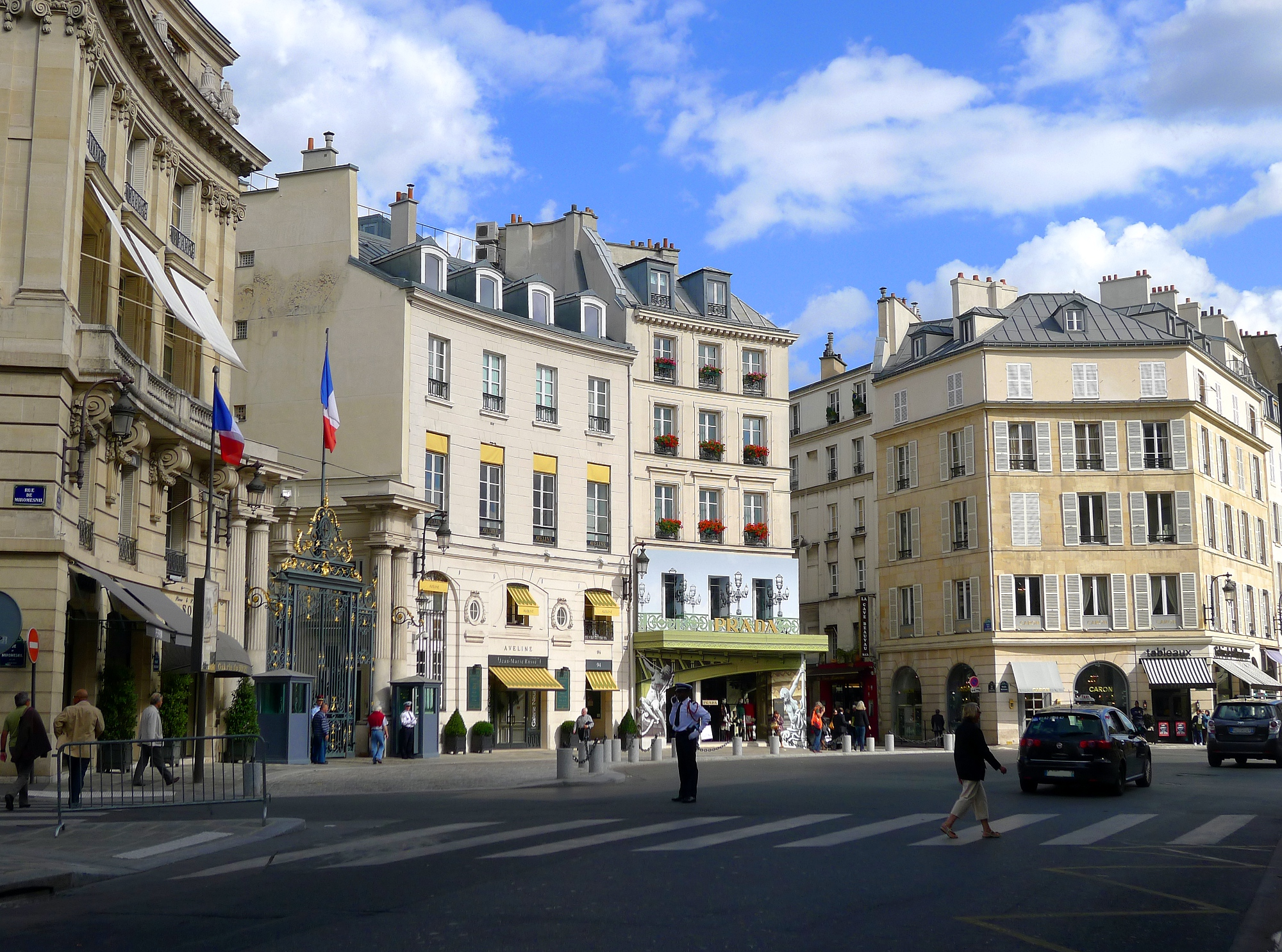
- View of Place Beauvau

- Location within Paris
- Length: 60 m (200 ft)
- Width: 60 m (200 ft)
- Arrondissement: 8th
- Quarter: La Madeleine; Champs-Élysées
- Coordinates: 48°52′16″N 2°18′58.5″E

Construction
- Completion: 1770
- Denomination: Beauvau

Place Beauvau (French pronunciation: [plas bovo]; English: Beauvau Square) is a public square in the 8th arrondissement of Paris, at the intersection of the Rue du Faubourg-Saint-Honoré, the Avenue de Marigny, the Rue des Saussaies and the Rue de Miromesnil. It is located in the La Madeleine neighbourhood, next to the Élysée Palace.

Place Beauvau is the site of the Hôtel de Beauvau, the official residence of the French Minister of the Interior, and is used as a metonym for the ministry.

== Hôtel de Beauvau ==
The Place Beauvau is best known for the Hôtel de Beauvau, a private residence built by the architect Nicolas Le Camus de Mézières around 1770 for Charles Juste de Beauvau, 2nd Prince of Craon. In 1859, the Government of France purchased the building and installed the French governor-general of Algeria there. However, Victor Fialin, the duke of Persigny, who was Minister of the Interior under Napoleon III, arranged for his ministry to be moved from the Rue de Grenelle, in the 7th arrondissement, to this location.

The Hôtel de Beauvau has housed the Ministry of the Interior since 1861; "Place Beauvau", or simply "Beauvau", is often used in French news media as a metonym for the ministry. The buildings to the north of the square are devoted to various services of the ministry.

== Nearby places of interest ==
- The Élysée Palace (Palais de l'Élysée), located on the Rue du Faubourg Saint-Honoré, is the official residence of the President of the French Republic, where the president's office is located, and the Council of Ministers meets.
- Important foreign visitors are hosted at the nearby Hôtel de Marigny (not a hotel in the English sense, but a palatial residence.)
- The Service de Protection des Hautes Personnalités (SPHP) is a French national police unit in charge of the protection of high-profile personalities who visit France. It is located just a few steps off the Place Beauvau in the Rue de Miromesnil.

== Metro stations ==
Place Beauvau is:

Located near the Metro stations: Miromesnil and Champs-Élysées–Clemenceau.

It is served by Lines 1, 9 and 13.
