= Auber station =

Railway station in Paris, France

Auber Opéra–Havre–Caumartin
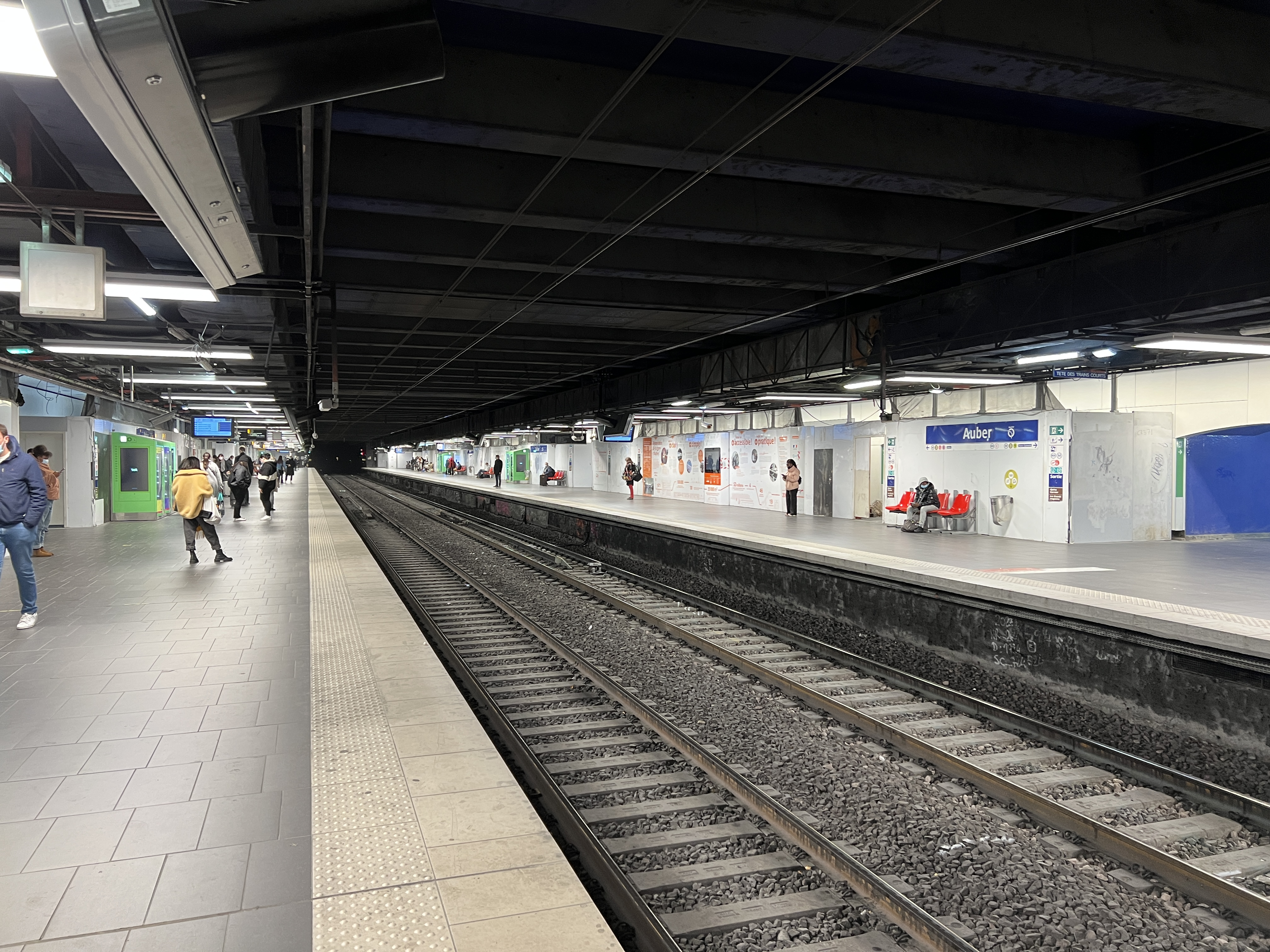
- Platforms in 2021

General information
- Location: 9th arrondissement of Paris; France
- Coordinates: 48°52′23″N 2°19′44″E
- Operator: RATP Group
- Platforms: 2 side platforms
- Tracks: 2
- Bus routes: 20 21 22 27 29 32 42 66 68 95; N01 N02 N15 N16
- Connections: at Haussmann–Saint-Lazare; at Havre–Caumartin; at Opéra; at Saint-Augustin; Normandie at Gare Saint-Lazare; at Saint-Augustin

Construction
- Structure type: Underground
- Accessible: Yes, by request to staff

Other information
- Station code: 87758599
- Fare zone: 1

History
- Opened: 23 November 1971

Passengers
- 2019: 6,168,061

Services
Preceding station	RER	Following station
Charles de Gaulle–Étoile towards Saint-Germain-en-Laye, Cergy-le-Haut or Poissy	RER A	Châtelet–Les Halles towards Boissy-Saint-Léger or Marne-la-Vallée–Chessy
Connections to other stations
Preceding station	RER	Following station
Neuilly–Porte Maillot towards Nanterre–La Folie	RER E transfer at Haussmann–Saint-Lazare	Magenta towards Chelles–Gournay or Tournan
Preceding station	Paris Metro	Following station
Europe towards Pont de Levallois–Bécon	Line 3 transfer at Saint-Lazare	Havre–Caumartin towards Gallieni
Saint-Lazare towards Pont de Levallois–Bécon	Line 3 transfer at Havre–Caumartin	Opéra towards Gallieni
Havre–Caumartin towards Pont de Levallois–Bécon	Line 3 transfer at Opéra	Quatre-Septembre towards Gallieni
Pyramides towards Villejuif–Louis Aragon or Mairie d'Ivry	Line 7 transfer at Opéra	Chaussée d'Antin–La Fayette towards La Courneuve–8 mai 1945
Madeleine towards Balard	Line 8 transfer at Opéra	Richelieu–Drouot towards Pointe du Lac
Miromesnil towards Pont de Sèvres	Line 9 transfer at Saint-Augustin	Havre–Caumartin towards Mairie de Montreuil
Saint-Augustin towards Pont de Sèvres	Line 9 transfer at Havre–Caumartin	Chaussée d'Antin–La Fayette towards Mairie de Montreuil
Madeleine towards Mairie d'Issy	Line 12 transfer at Saint-Lazare	Trinité–d'Estienne d'Orves towards Mairie d'Aubervilliers
Miromesnil towards Châtillon–Montrouge	Line 13 transfer at Saint-Lazare	Liège towards Les Courtilles or Saint-Denis–Université
Pont Cardinet towards Saint-Denis–Pleyel	Line 14 transfer at Saint-Lazare	Madeleine towards Aéroport d'Orly
Location

Auber ([obɛːʁ]) is a station on RER A in Paris. Opened on 23 November 1971 and inaugurated during a ceremony by singers Dalida and Adamo, it is one of the largest vaulted underground stations in the world.

The station comprises a main train hall with a superposed ticket hall, together with an extensive network of tunnels connecting to the neighbouring Métro stations Opéra, Havre–Caumartin and Saint-Lazare, as well as Haussmann–Saint-Lazare on RER E. It takes its name from Rue Auber, under which it is situated. This street is in turn named after the mostly forgotten composer Daniel Auber (1782–1871). A complete renovation of the station was started in 2017 and is due to be finished in 2022.

== Engineering ==
Auber is built in the style of the traditional vaulted Métro station as pioneered by Fulgence Bienvenüe, with central tracks and lateral platforms. The difference in engineering terms is that Auber (along with Charles de Gaulle–Étoile and Nation stations) was constructed at depth, entirely underground, on a far larger scale than any Métro station.

To build the 225-metre long, 24-metre wide train hall and its even larger piggy-backing ticket hall, it was necessary to excavate a cavity 40-metre wide, 20-metre high and 250-metre long—this 30-metre underneath the busy city centre in unstable waterlogged sedimentary rock. The resulting station is cathedral-like in proportions, with a ticket hall so spacious that there is room for a mezzanine. The entire construction is waterproofed on both sides by a 7-metre thick, 10-metre high abutment of concrete which contains escalators linking the two levels.

The station's eccentrically audacious scale and damp setting earned it references as "the world's largest submarine". With the other two deep single-vaulted stations on RER A it was retrospectively criticised on cost grounds. However, Auber is often mentioned as a good example of a planning policy attached to grand public spaces that was particularly current in the 1960s and in France.

Auber forms part of a complex of connected underground stations. The scale of Auber, in particular, makes the ensemble one of the largest underground stations in the world in terms of volume.

== Particulate pollution ==
During busy periods, PM10 particle pollution caused by train braking regularly reaches 400 μg/m^{3} at Auber, eight times the EU Commission's daily average limit.

== Gallery ==
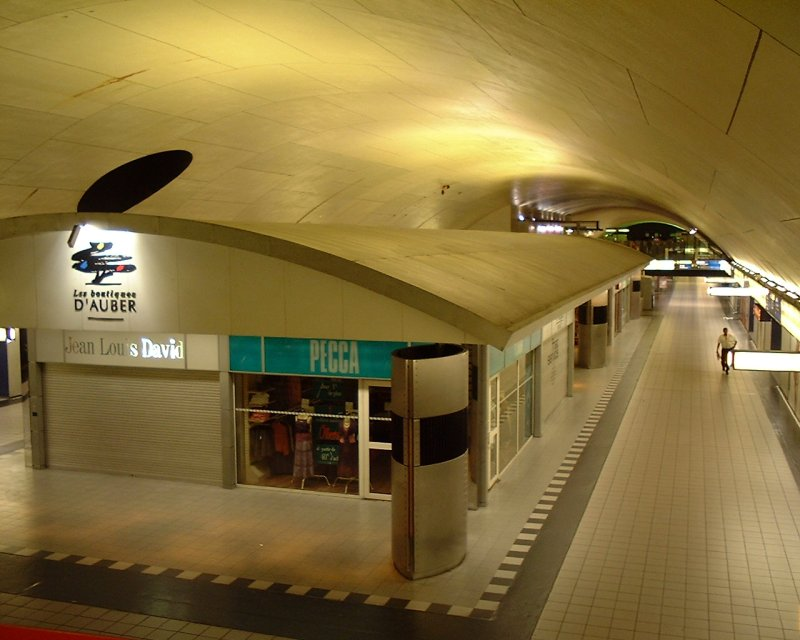
Ticket hall of Auber

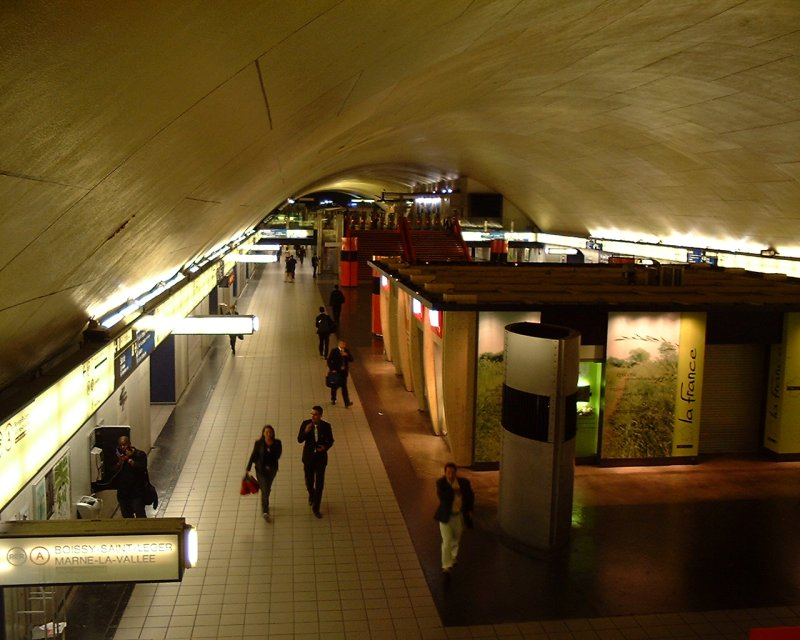
Ticket hall of Auber

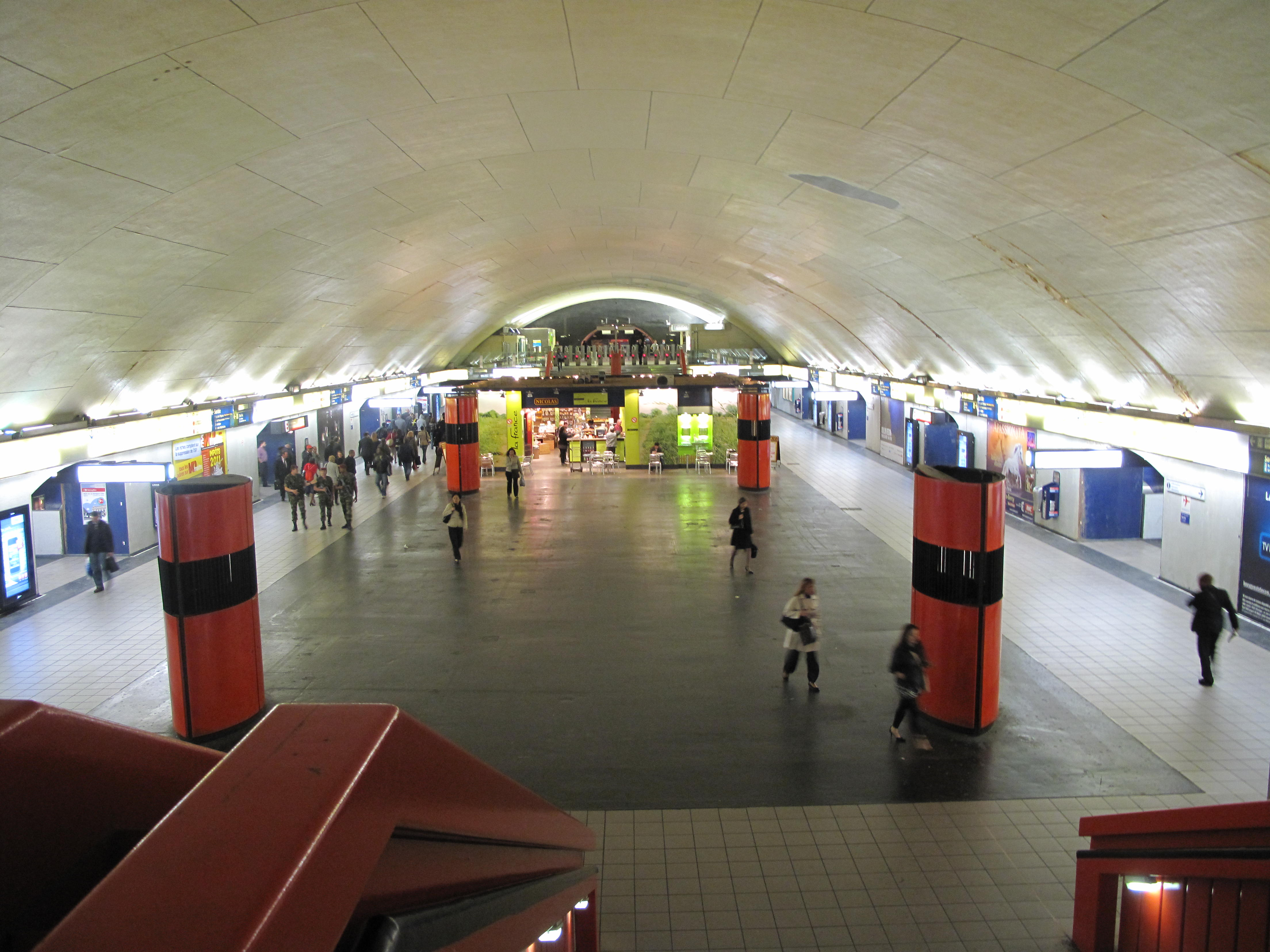
Main hall

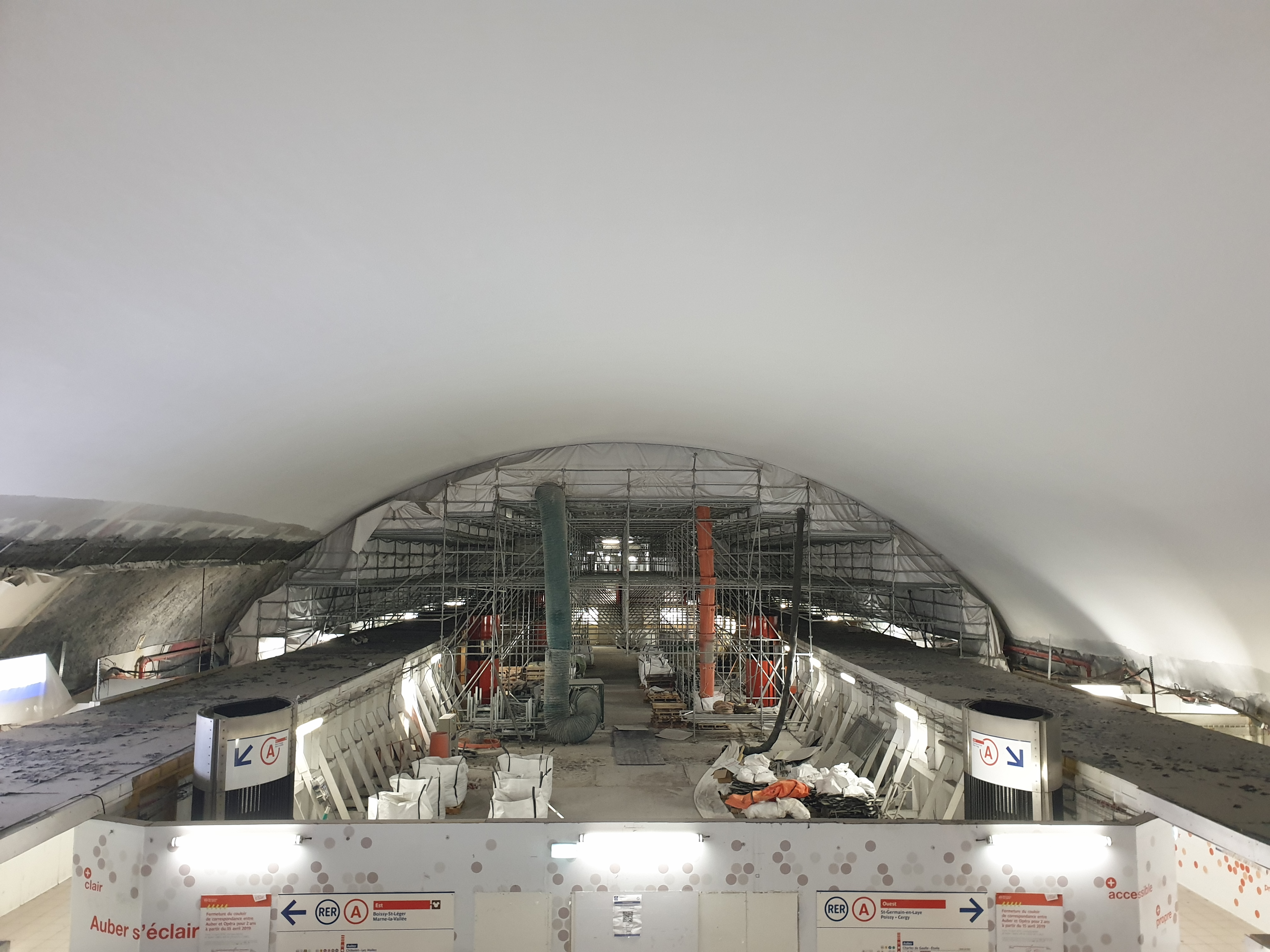
Renovation of the main hall in January 2020

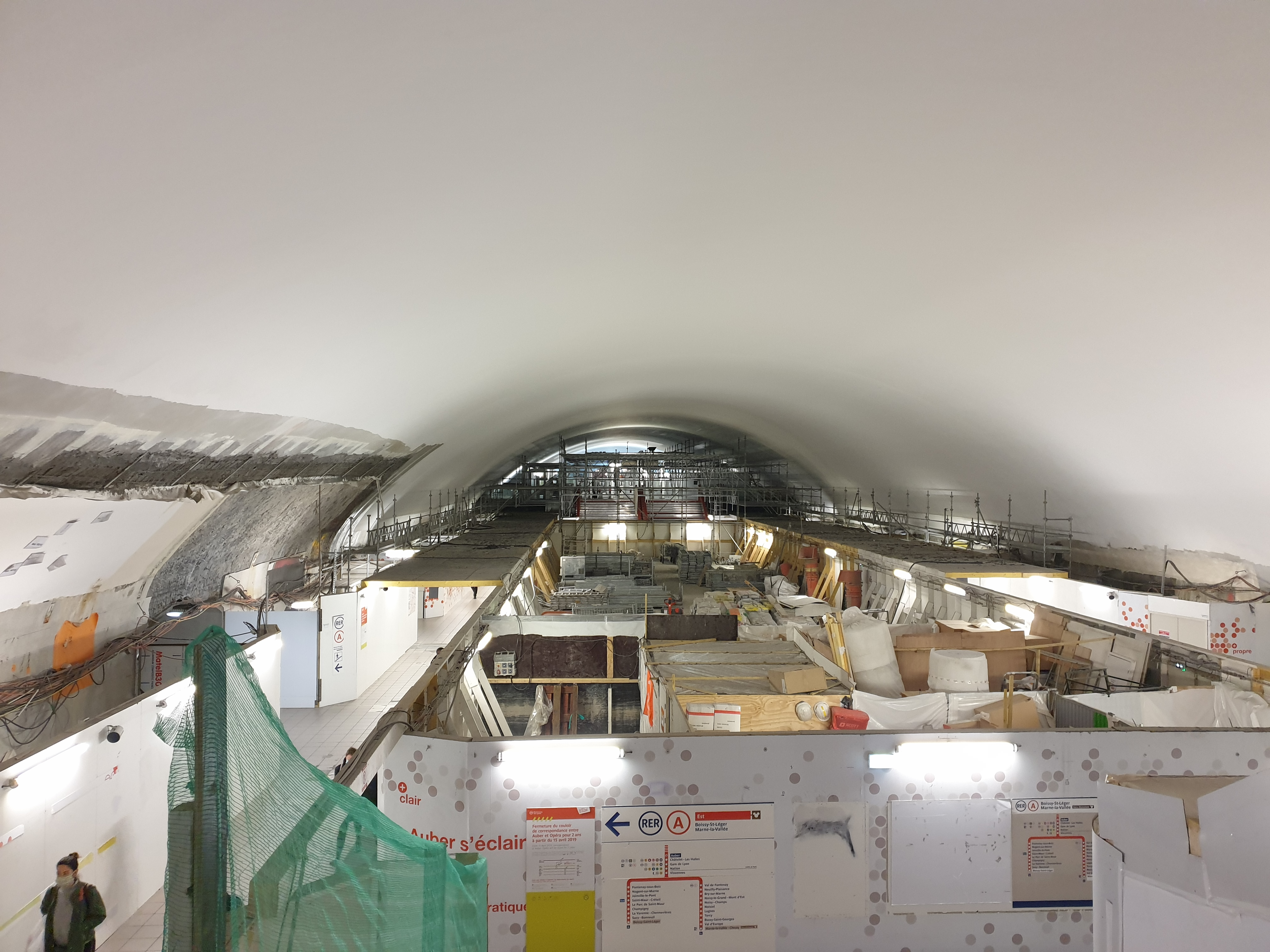
Renovation of the main hall in October 2020

== See also ==
- List of Réseau Express Régional stations
- List of Paris Métro stations
