= Franklin D. Roosevelt station =

Paris Métro station

Franklin D. Roosevelt
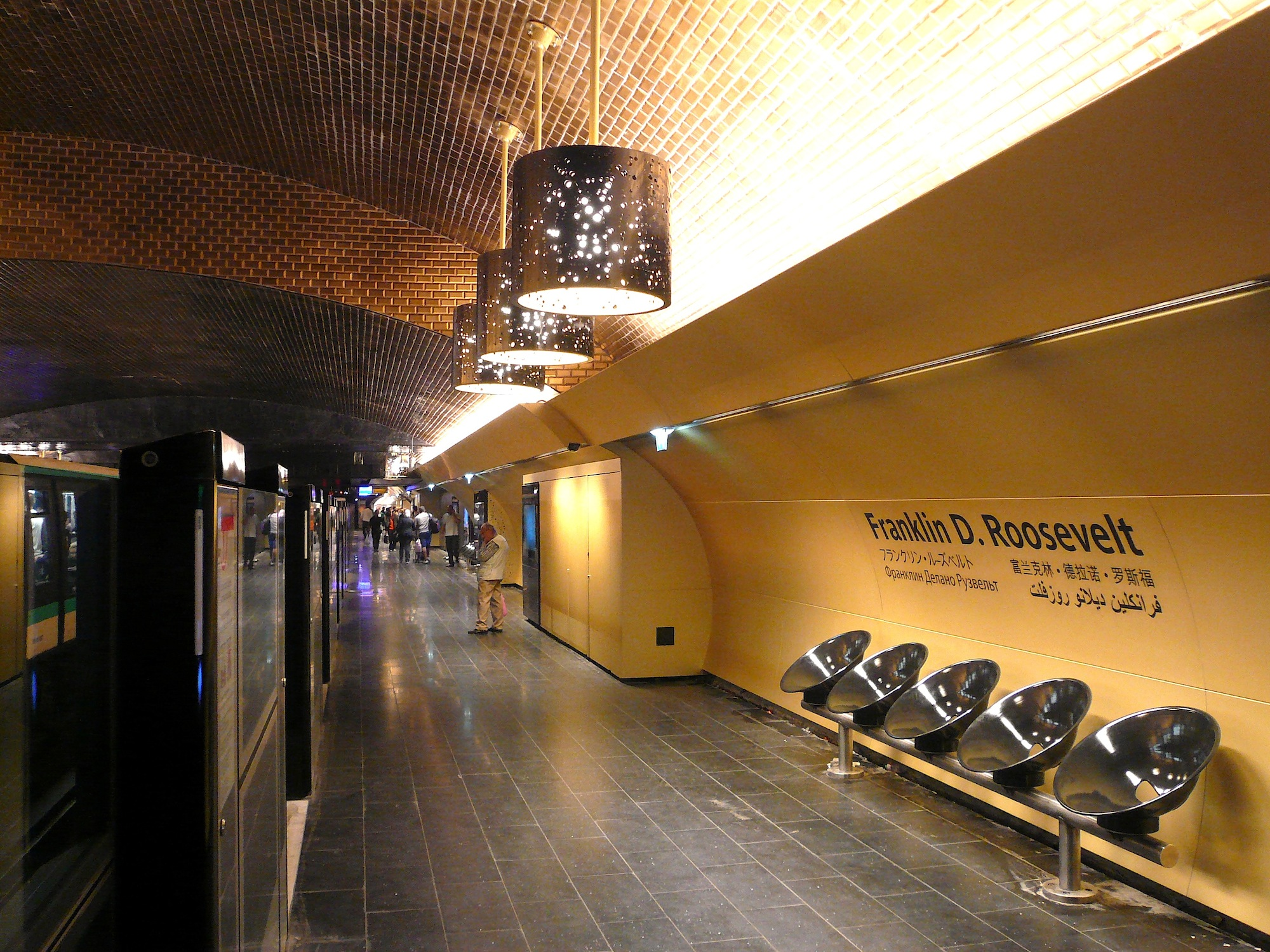
- Line 1 platforms

General information
- Location: 27, Av. des Champs-Élysées; 35, Av. des Champs-Élysées; 40, Av. des Champs-Élysées; 44, Av. des Champs-Élysées; 3, Rond-point des Champs-Élysées; 7, Rond-point des Champs-Élysées; 60, Av. Montaigne; 8th arrondissement of Paris; Île-de-France; France
- Coordinates: 48°52′08″N 2°18′36″E
- Owner: RATP
- Operator: RATP
- Line: Paris Metro Paris Metro Line 1 Paris Metro Line 9
- Platforms: 4 (side platforms)
- Tracks: 4

Construction
- Accessible: no

Other information
- Fare zone: 1

History
- Opened: 19 July 1900; 126 years ago (Line 1); 27 May 1923; 103 years ago (Line 9)
- Former names: Marbeuf (1900–1942, Line 1); Rond-Point des Champs-Élysées (1923–1942, Line 9); Champs-Élysées–Marbeuf (1942–1946)

Services
Preceding station	Paris Metro	Following station
George V towards La Défense	Line 1	Champs-Élysées–Clemenceau towards Château de Vincennes
Alma–Marceau towards Pont de Sèvres	Line 9	Saint-Philippe du Roule towards Mairie de Montreuil
Route map
Line 1
Line 9
Location
- Location within Paris

Franklin D. Roosevelt (French pronunciation: [fʁɑ̃klɛ̃ de ʁozvɛlt]) is a station on Lines 1 and 9 of the Paris Métro in the 8th arrondissement. With more than nine million passengers annually (2019), it is the nineteenth busiest station in the Paris Métro system.

== History ==
Originally, the stations on the two lines were separate. The Line 1 station opened as part of the first stage of the line between Porte de Vincennes and Porte Maillot on 19 July 1900 and was called Marbeuf up until 6 October 1942. It was named after Rue Marbeuf, which in turn was named after the Marquise de Marbeuf, who had developed the area in the 1770s and was guillotined during the Reign of Terror. It was renamed Rond-Pont-des-Champs-Elysees until 30 October 1946.

The Line 9 station opened when the line was extended from Trocadéro to Saint-Augustin on 27 May 1923 and was called Rond-Point des Champs-Élysées or just Rond-Point. On 6 October 1942 a connection between the two stations was opened and the new station was renamed Marbeuf–Rond-Point des Champs-Élysées (or more often Champs-Élysées–Marbeuf). This new station became Franklin D. Roosevelt station in 1946 when the nearby Avenue Victor-Emmanuel III was renamed Franklin D. Roosevelt Avenue, in honour of US President Franklin D. Roosevelt who had been an ally of France during World War II, as opposed to Victor Emmanuel III, the king of Italy who, although allied with France during the First World War, had fought against France as king of Fascist Italy during the Second World War.

The station was renovated after the Second World War and the work introduced a new artistic technique known as "gemmail", which is often called "block glass" or "glass brick" in English. Sometimes it is also called a "station musée" (station-museum). While one can find some of the glass brick along the platform for Line 9, more of it can be found in along the platform serving Line 1. The inauguration of the finished station involved a large ceremony on the night of 1 March 1957, with two ramps equipped with tables of food for the invited guests.

As part of the automation project on Line 1, its platforms were completely renovated in 2008.

== Passenger services ==
=== Access ===
The station has seven entrances, the first two of which are only accessible from the platforms of Line 1, given that its stopping point was originally independent of that of Line 9.

- Access 1 - 27, Avenue des Champs-Élysées;
- Access 2 - 35, Avenue des Champs-Élysées;
- Access 3 - 40, avenue des Champs-Élysées;
- Access 4 - 44, Avenue des Champs-Élysées;
- Access 5 - 3, rond-point des Champs-Élysées;
- Access 6 - 7, rond-point des Champs-Élysées;
- Access 7 - 60, Avenue Montaigne.

=== Station layout ===
Street Level

B1	Mezzanine for platform connection

Line 1 platforms	Side platform with PSDs, doors will open on the right
Line 1 platforms	Platform 1	← toward La Défense – Grande Arche (George V)
Line 1 platforms	Platform 2	toward Château de Vincennes (Champs-Élysées – Clemenceau) →
Line 1 platforms	Side platform with PSDs, doors will open on the right

Line 9 platforms	Side platform, doors will open on the right
Line 9 platforms	Platform 2	← toward Pont de Sèvres (Alma – Marceau)
Line 9 platforms	Platform 1	toward Mairie de Montreuil (Saint-Philippe du Roule) →
Line 9 platforms	Side platform, doors will open on the right

=== Platforms ===
The platforms of the two lines are of standard configuration: there are two per stopping point, they are separated by the tracks located in the centre and the vault is elliptical. On the other hand, they are distinguished by their cultural layout, which itself differs between the two lines.

In Line 1, the walls are clad in illuminated gilded metal panels, while the vault, as well as the tunnel exits, are clad in bevelled champagne-coloured tiles and fitted with cylindrical ceiling lamps decorated with bubble motifs. The platforms are tiled in anthracite grey and fitted with landing doors partially painted black. The name of the station is written directly on the metal panels in five different languages. On each platform, three touch screens display maps of the network, a map of the neighbourhood and a route finder. Five additional screens present advertising campaigns as well as cultural programmes. They will screen four two-minute films, produced by the French National Centre for Scientific Research (CNRS) as part of the International Year of Chemistry, and three films made by the artist Marko Echeverria as part of his work Passenger Landscapes. These amenities are complemented by black Akiko style seats.

On Line 9, the metalwork is in the form of honey-coloured aluminium panelling comprising a set of brass-rimmed display cases. Many of them are now empty. Their partial closure reveals the old wall of the station still covered with its original bevelled white tiles, which also covers the vault while the tunnel exits are treated with metal wall facings. The name of the station appears in raised honey-coloured capital letters above the display windows. This layout is complemented by yellow Motte style seats and specific lighting canopies with metal slats in a shape close to a semicircle.

=== Bus connections ===
The station is served by lines 28, 32 (in the direction of Gare de l'Est only), 42, 73, 80 and 93 of the RATP Bus Network and, at night, by lines N11 and N24 of the Noctilien bus network.

== Nearby ==
- Access to the Petit and Grand Palais
- Beginning of the large amount of department stores on the Champs-Élysées (Virgin, Cartes IGN, etc.)
- Access to the tree-lined part of the Champs-Élysées
- Théâtre du Rond-Point
- Embassy of Germany, Paris

== Gallery ==
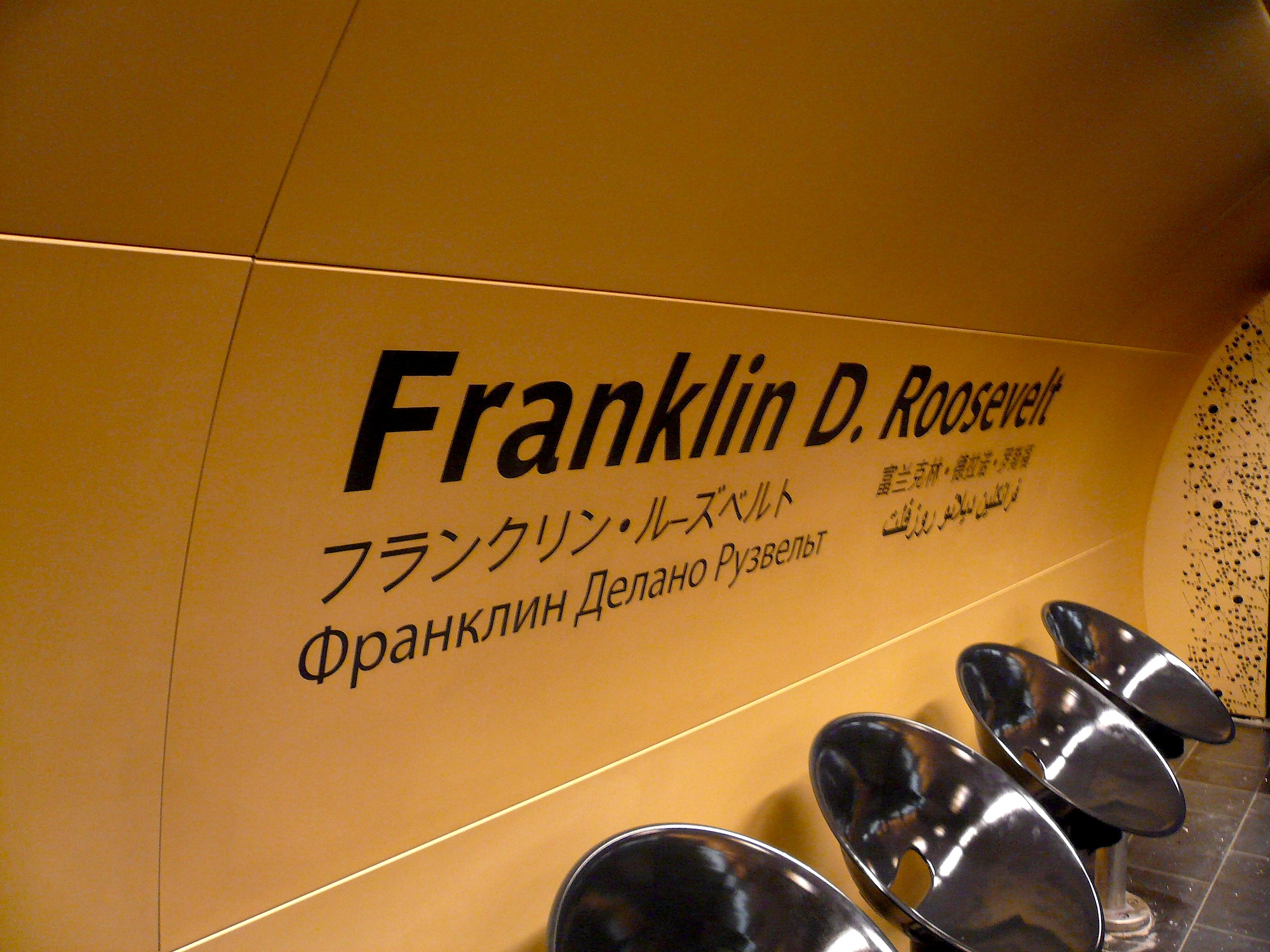
Updated station signage after 2011 renovation

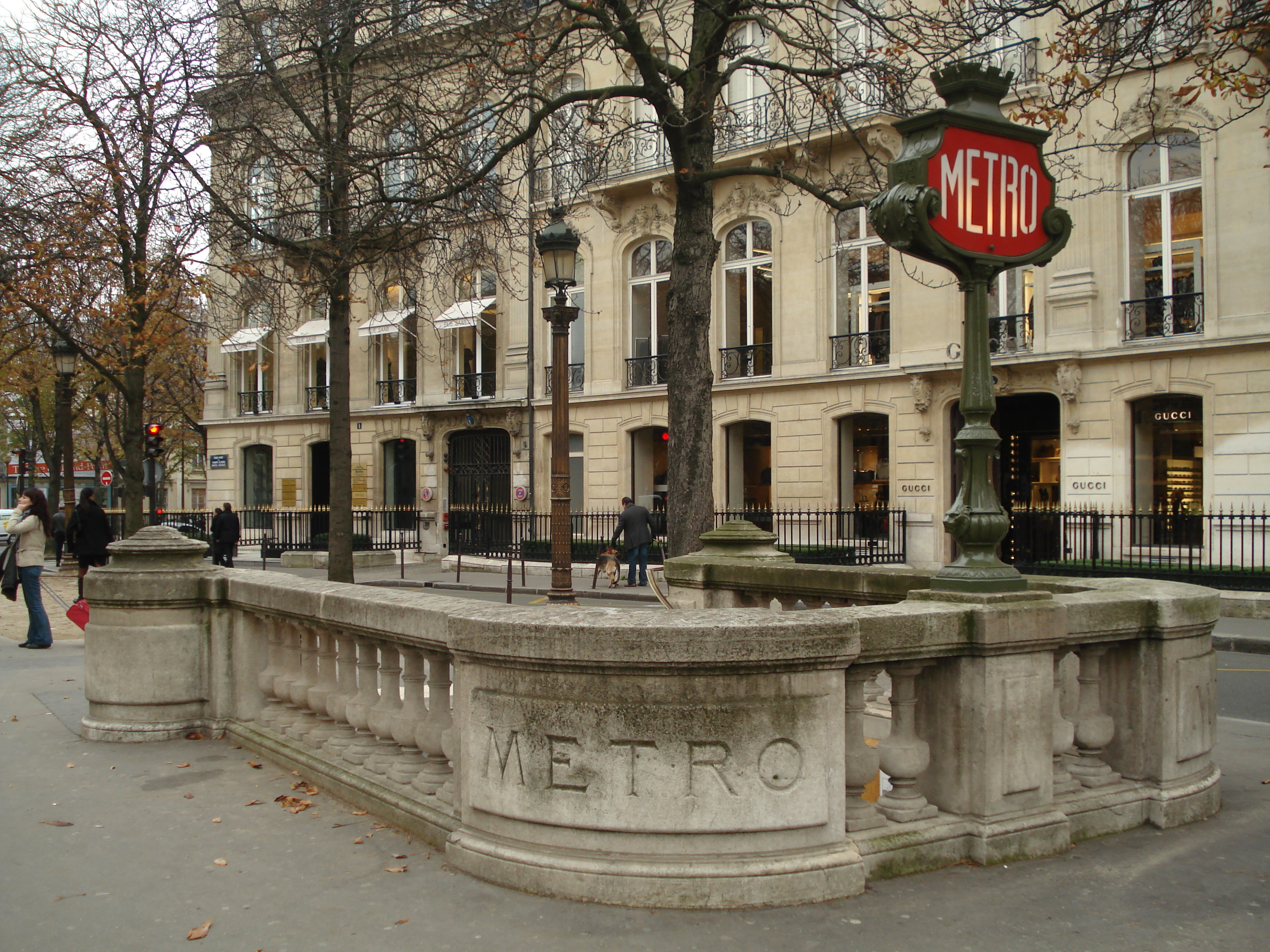
Station entrance

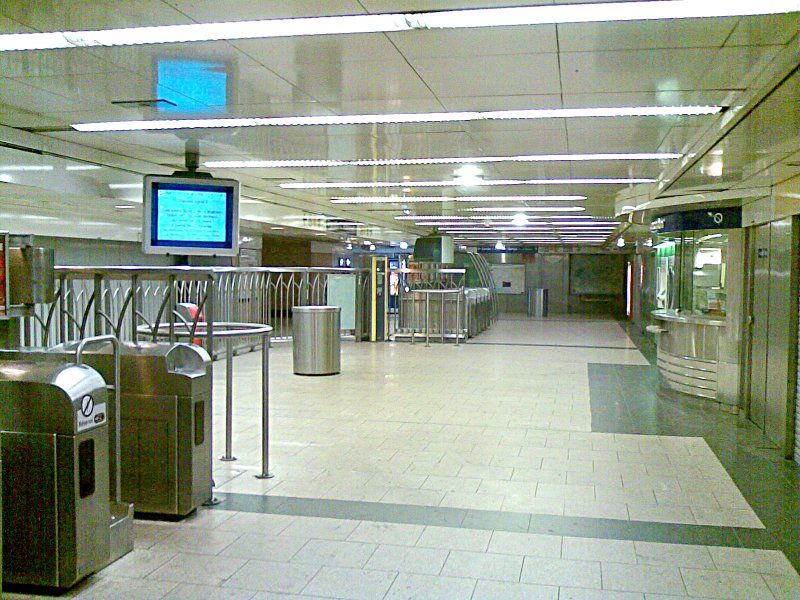
Ticket concourse

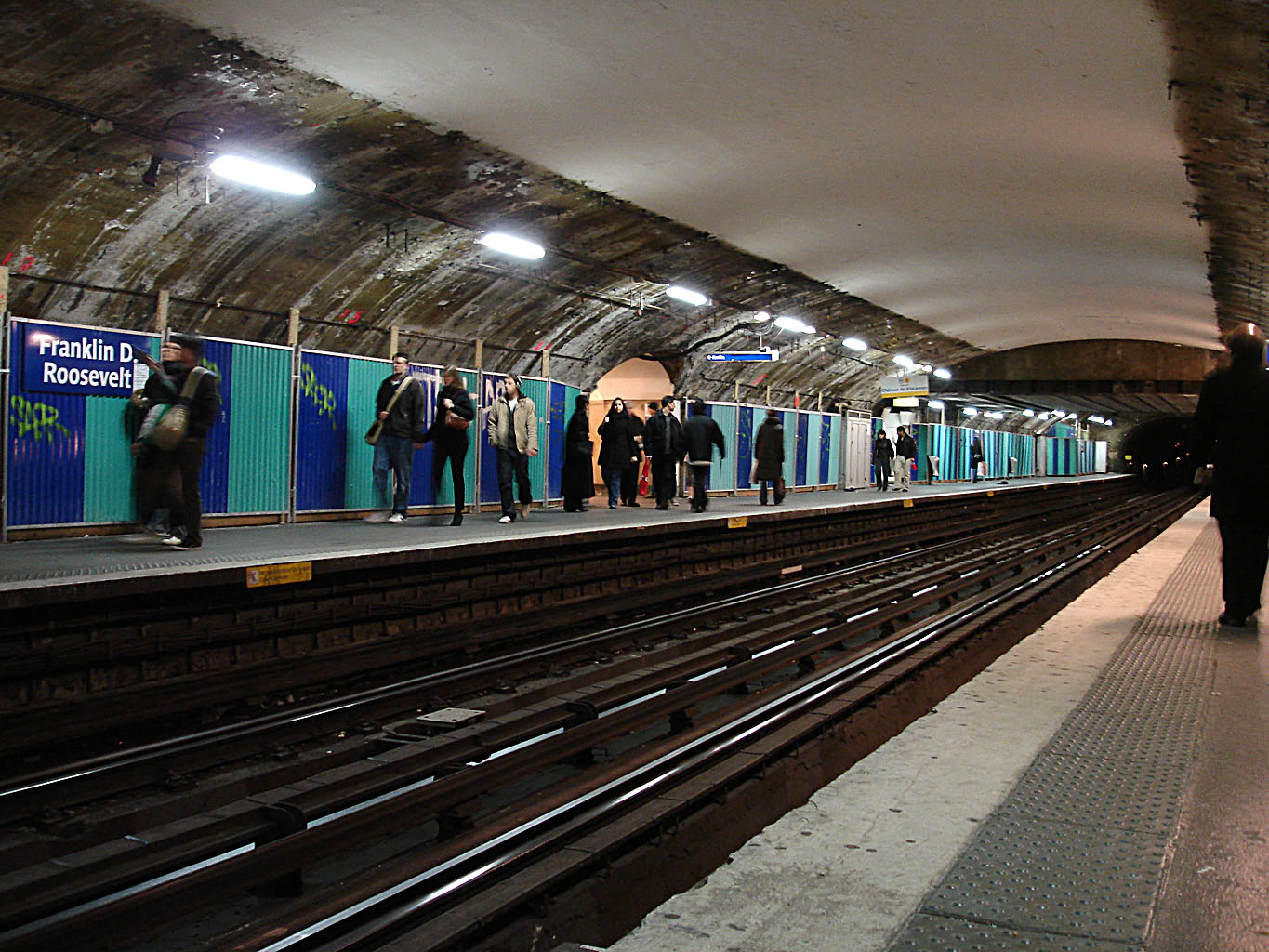
Line 1 platforms during automation programme in March 2008

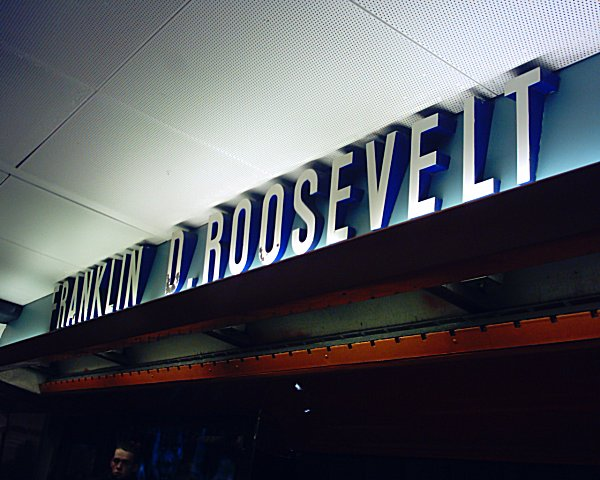
Line 1 signage

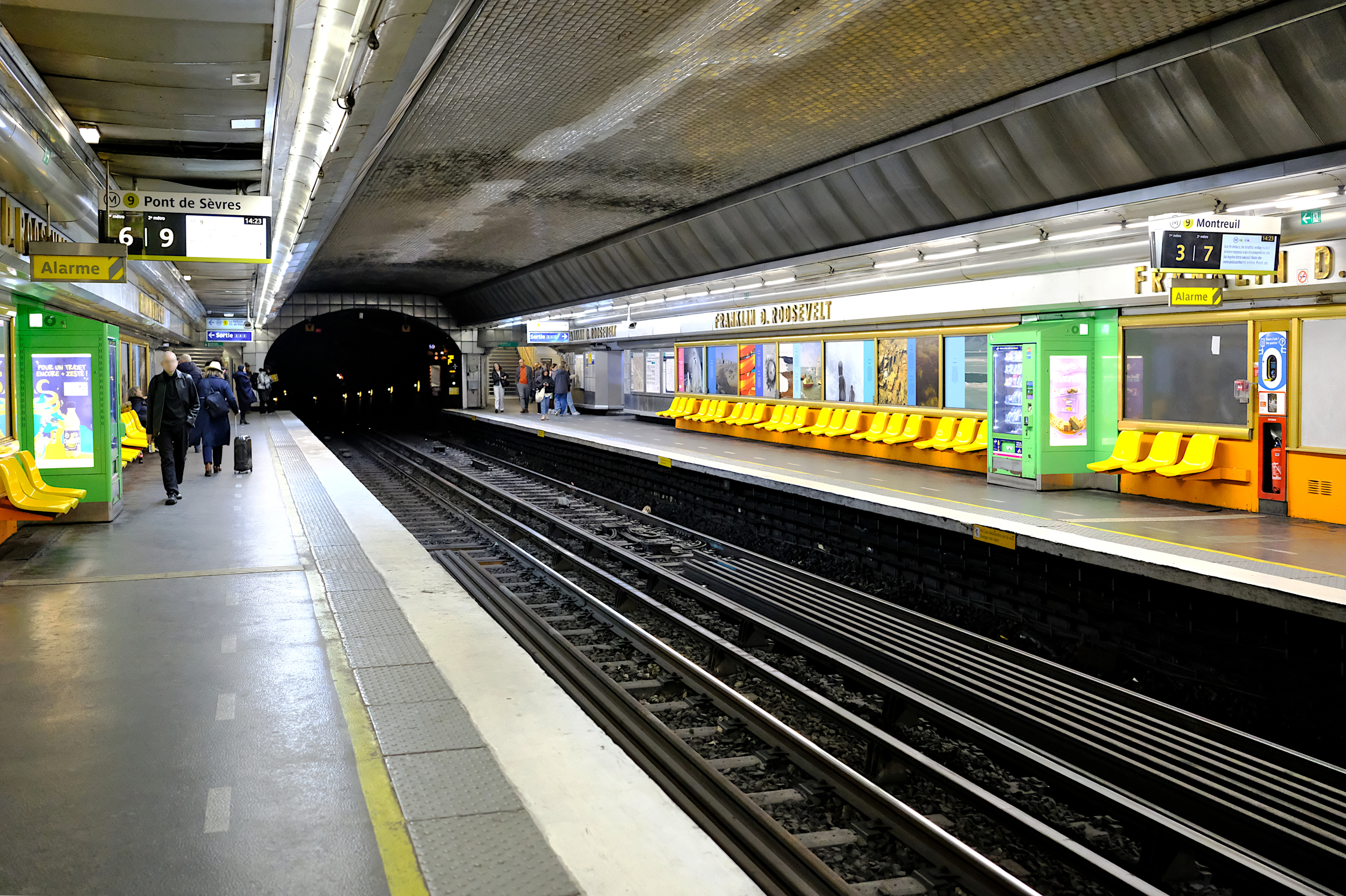
Line 9 platforms

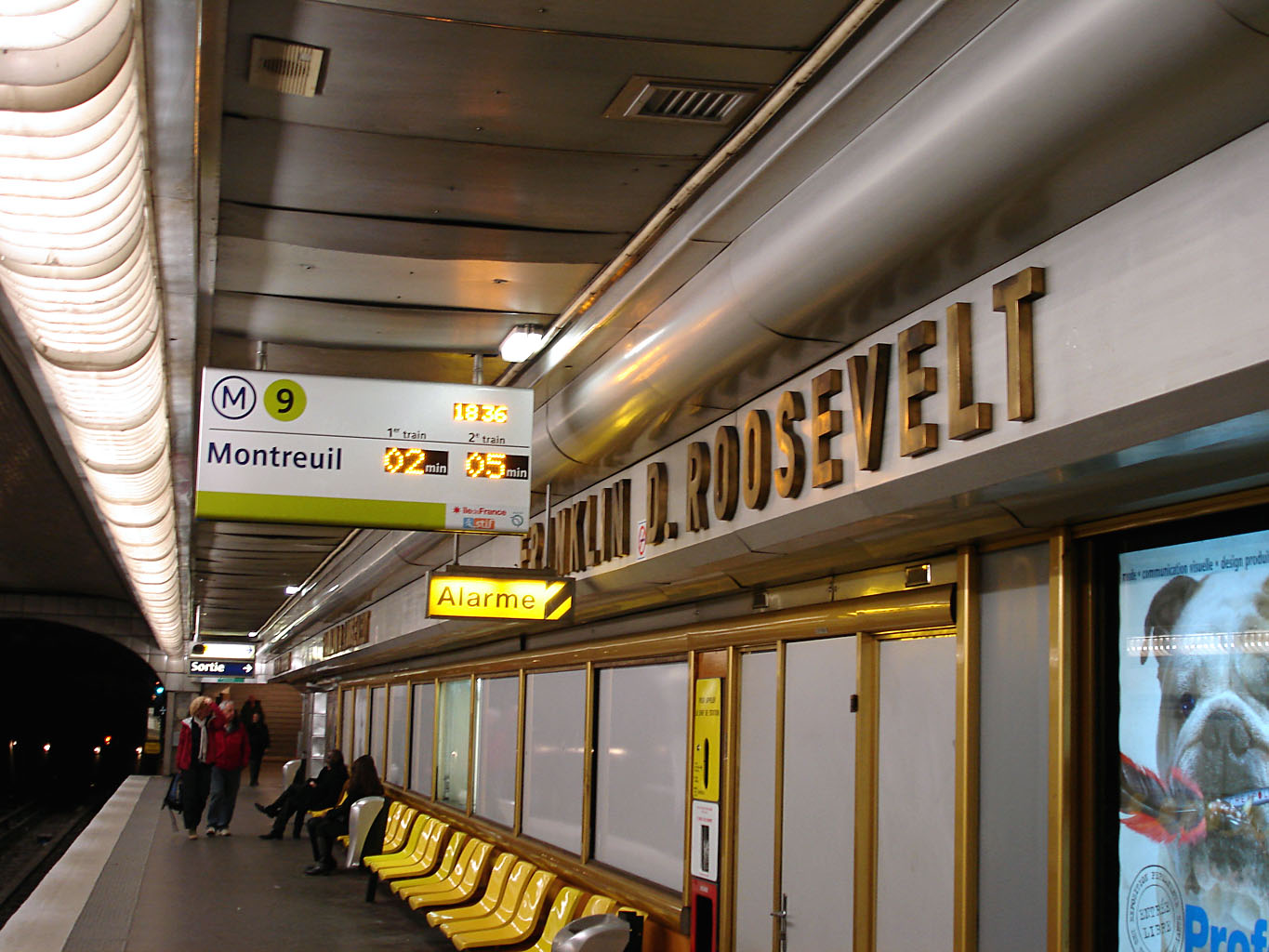
Line 9 signage

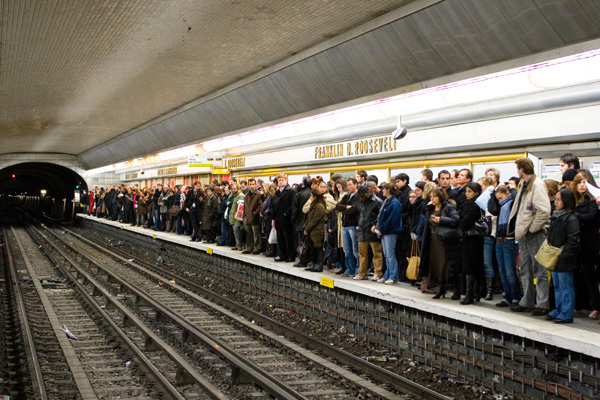
Line 9 on a strike day in 2007
