= Havre–Caumartin station =

Metro station in Paris, France

Havre–Caumartin
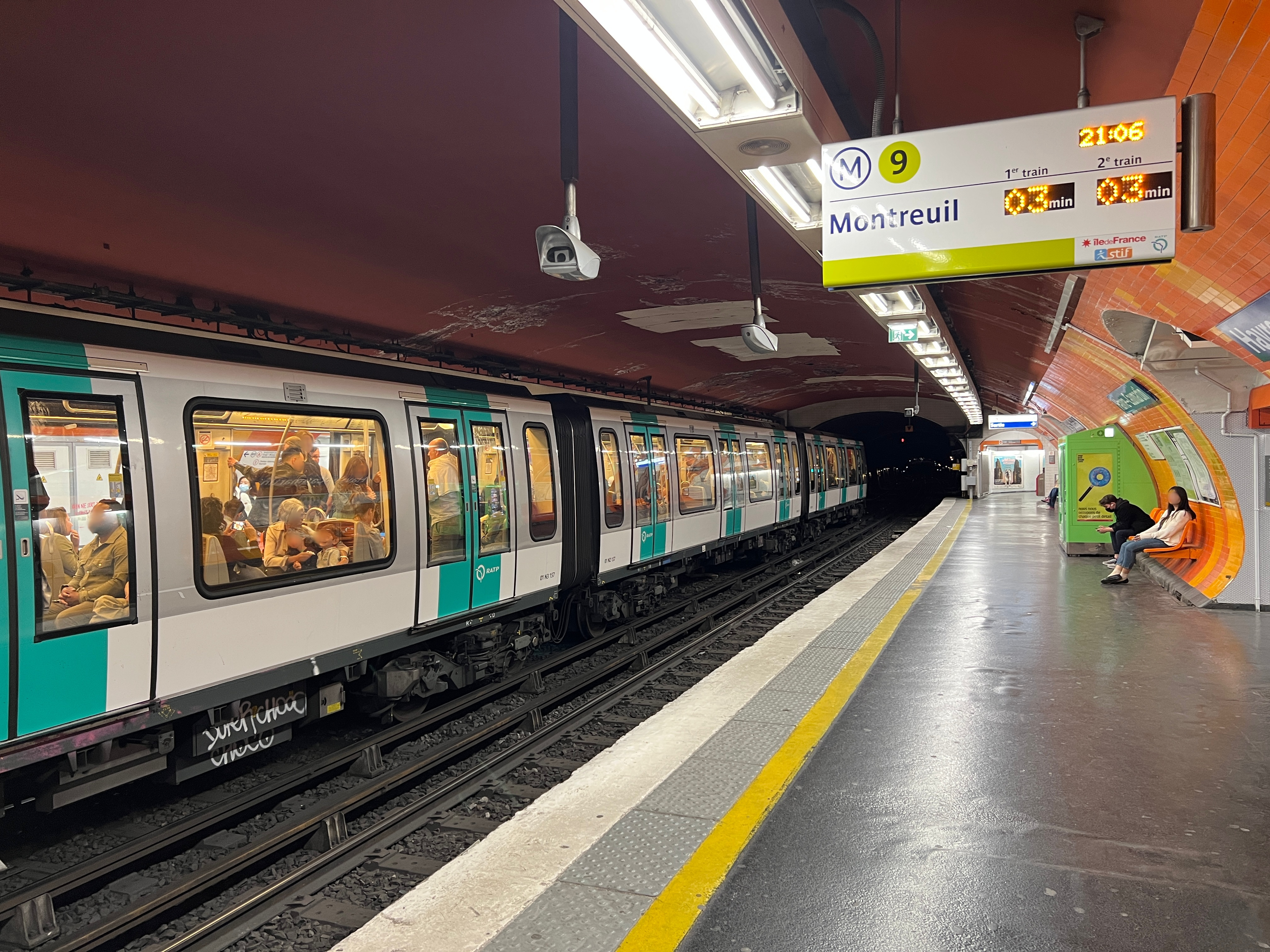
- Line 9 platforms at Havre–Caumartin

General information
- Location: Boul. Haussmann (even) at Rue du Havre Boul. Haussmann (odd) at Rue Caumartin; Rue Auber Boul. Haussmann (even) at Rue Caumartin; 9th arrondissement of Paris; Île-de-France; France
- Coordinates: 48°52′24″N 2°19′41″E
- Owner: RATP
- Operator: RATP

Other information
- Fare zone: 1

History
- Opened: 19 October 1904

Services
Preceding station	Paris Metro	Following station
Saint-Lazare towards Pont de Levallois–Bécon	Line 3	Opéra towards Gallieni
Saint-Augustin towards Pont de Sèvres	Line 9	Chaussée d'Antin–La Fayette towards Mairie de Montreuil
Connections to other stations
Pyramides towards Villejuif–Louis Aragon or Mairie d'Ivry	Line 7 transfer at Opéra	Chaussée d'Antin–La Fayette towards La Courneuve–8 mai 1945
Madeleine towards Balard	Line 8 transfer at Opéra	Richelieu–Drouot towards Pointe du Lac
Madeleine towards Mairie d'Issy	Line 12 transfer at Saint-Lazare	Trinité–d'Estienne d'Orves towards Mairie d'Aubervilliers
Miromesnil towards Châtillon–Montrouge	Line 13 transfer at Saint-Lazare	Liège towards Les Courtilles or Saint-Denis–Université
Pont Cardinet towards Saint-Denis–Pleyel	Line 14 transfer at Saint-Lazare	Madeleine towards Aéroport d'Orly
Preceding station	RER	Following station
Charles de Gaulle–Étoile towards Saint-Germain-en-Laye, Cergy-le-Haut or Poissy	RER A transfer at Auber	Châtelet–Les Halles towards Boissy-Saint-Léger or Marne-la-Vallée–Chessy
Terminus	RER E transfer at Haussmann–Saint-Lazare	Magenta towards Chelles–Gournay or Tournan
Location
- Location within Paris

Havre–Caumartin (French pronunciation: [avʁ komaʁtɛ̃]) is a station on Line 3 and Line 9 of the Paris Métro. It is located in the 9th arrondissement.

== Location ==
The station is located at the intersection of Rue de Caumartin and Boulevard Haussmann, and a hundred meters east of Rue du Havre, the platforms being established:

- on line 3, along a northwest / southeast axis under the end of Rue Auber (between Saint-Lazare and Opéra metro stations);
- on line 9, approximately along an east–west axis under Boulevard Haussmann (between Saint-Augustin and Chaussée d'Antin–La Fayette).

== History ==
Its opening dates from 19 October 1904, with the opening of the first section of Line 3 between the Avenue de Villiers (now known simply as Villiers) and Père Lachaise. The line 9 platforms opened on 3 June 1923 with the extension of the line from Saint-Augustin to Chaussée d'Antin–La Fayette. Up until 1926, the station was just named Caumartin.

The station is situated at the intersection of the Rue de Caumartin and the Boulevard Haussmann, and about 100 metres from the Rue du Havre. The Rue du Havre runs in front of the Gare Saint-Lazare, which is one of the principal destinations for Paris Métro travelers from Havre-Caumartin.

The station takes the last half of its name from the Marquis de Saint-Ange, François Le Fèvre de Caumartin, who was a leading merchant of Paris during the 18th century. The station is located at one end of the street that today carries his name.

== Passenger services ==
=== Access ===
The station has four entrances leading to Boulevard Haussmann, each consisting of a fixed staircase decorated with a pole with a yellow "M" inscribed in a circle:

- Entrance 1: Rue du Havre, to the right of the Le Printemps department store at no. 70 of the boulevard
- Entrance 2: Boulevard Haussmann – Department stores, also facing Printemps but at no. 56
- Entrance 3: Rue Auber, to the right of no. 53 of the boulevard
- Entrance 4: Rue de Caumartin, opposite no. 43 of the boulevard

=== Station layout ===
G	Street Level	Exit/Entrance
B1	Mezzanine	Fare control
B2	Side platform, doors will open on the right
B2	Westbound	← toward Pont de Levallois–Bécon (Saint-Lazare)
B2	Eastbound	toward Gallieni (Opéra) →
B2	Side platform, doors will open on the right
B3	Side platform, doors will open on the right
B3	Westbound	← toward Pont de Sèvres (Saint-Augustin)
B3	Eastbound	toward Mairie de Montreuil (Chaussée d'Antin–La Fayette) →
B3	Side platform, doors will open on the right

=== Platforms ===
The platforms of the two lines are of standard configuration. There are two per stopping point, they are separated by the metro tracks located in the centre.

Those of line 3 are established flush with the ground. The ceiling consists of a metal apron, the beams of which, yellow orange in colour, are supported by vertical walls. They are furnished in the Andreu-Motte style with two orange-yellow light canopies, benches, tunnels exits and walls covered with large flat white stretched sandstone tiles and yellow Motte seats. The advertisements are unframed, and the name of the station is written in Parisine font on enamel plates.

The platforms of line 9, established in a very slight curve, have an elliptical vault and are among the last of the network to have retained a Mouton-Duvernet style decoration, with walls fitted with flat bright orange tiles laid horizontally and aligned, as well as lighting canopies characteristic of this type of development. The tunnel exits are fitted with flat white tiles, also laid horizontally, and aligned, while the vault is painted in burgundy. The advertising frames are metallic, and the name of the station is written in Parisine font on enamel plates (replacing the original white embossed capital letters, typical of the Mouton style). The Motte style seats are orange in colour.

=== Other connections ===
The station is in direct correspondence with Auber and Haussmann–Saint-Lazare stations, served respectively by RER lines A and E. It is part of the longest connection on the Paris metro, which links Saint-Augustin to Opéra by connecting several metro stations and RER stations through corridors.

The station is also served by lines 20, 21 (towards Stade Sébastien Charléty only), 27, 29, 32, 42, 66, 94, and 95 of the RATP Bus Network and, at night, by lines N15 and N16 of the Noctilien bus network.

== Nearby ==
Nearby are the famous department stores of Printemps and Galeries Lafayette.

=== Nearby stations ===
The station offers connections to the following other stations:

- Auber on RER A
- Haussmann–Saint-Lazare on RER E
- Opéra on Lines 3, 7 and 8
- Saint-Lazare on Lines 3, 12, 13 and 14
- Saint-Augustin on Line 9

== Gallery ==
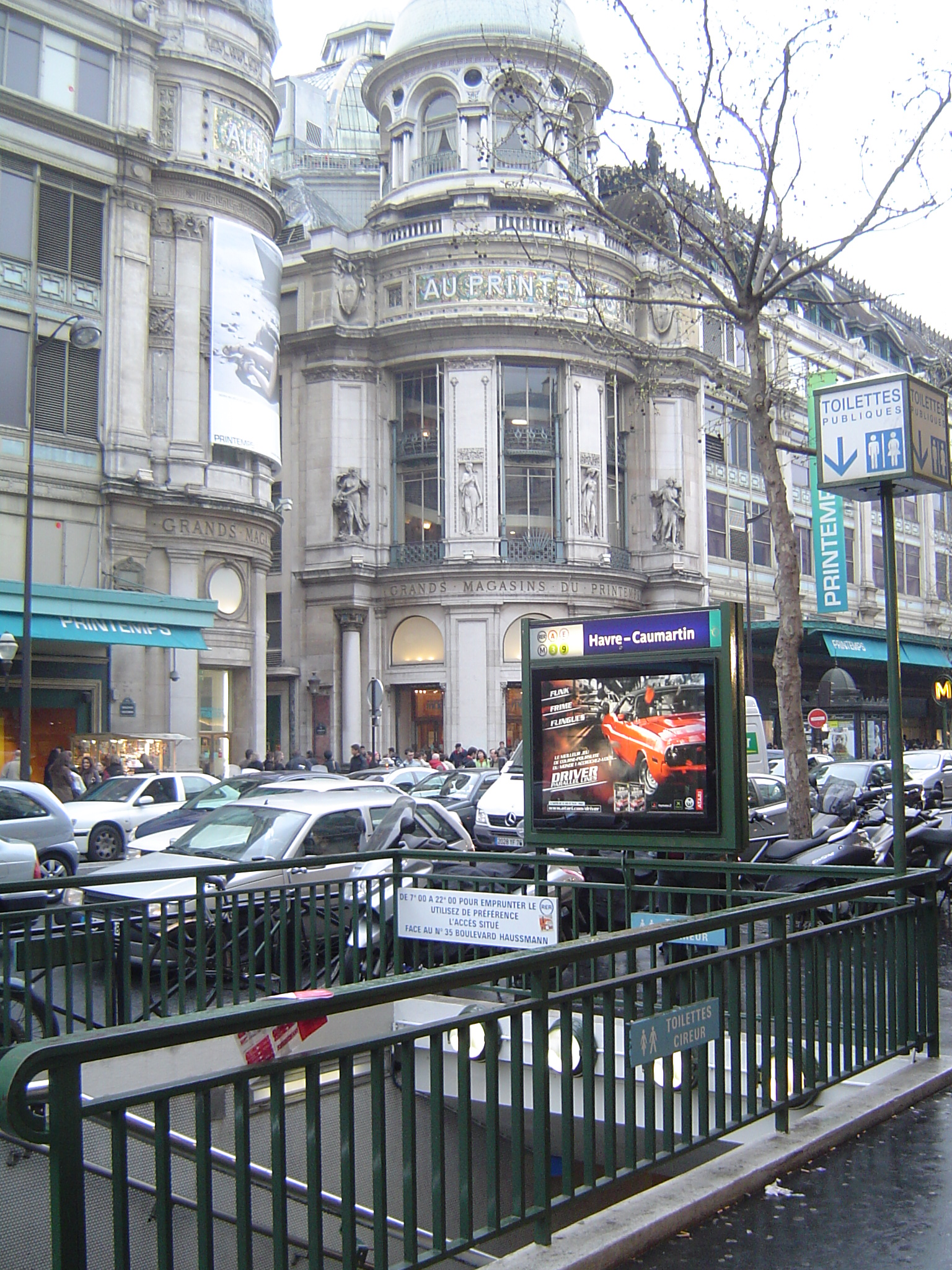
Street-level entrance at Havre–Caumartin

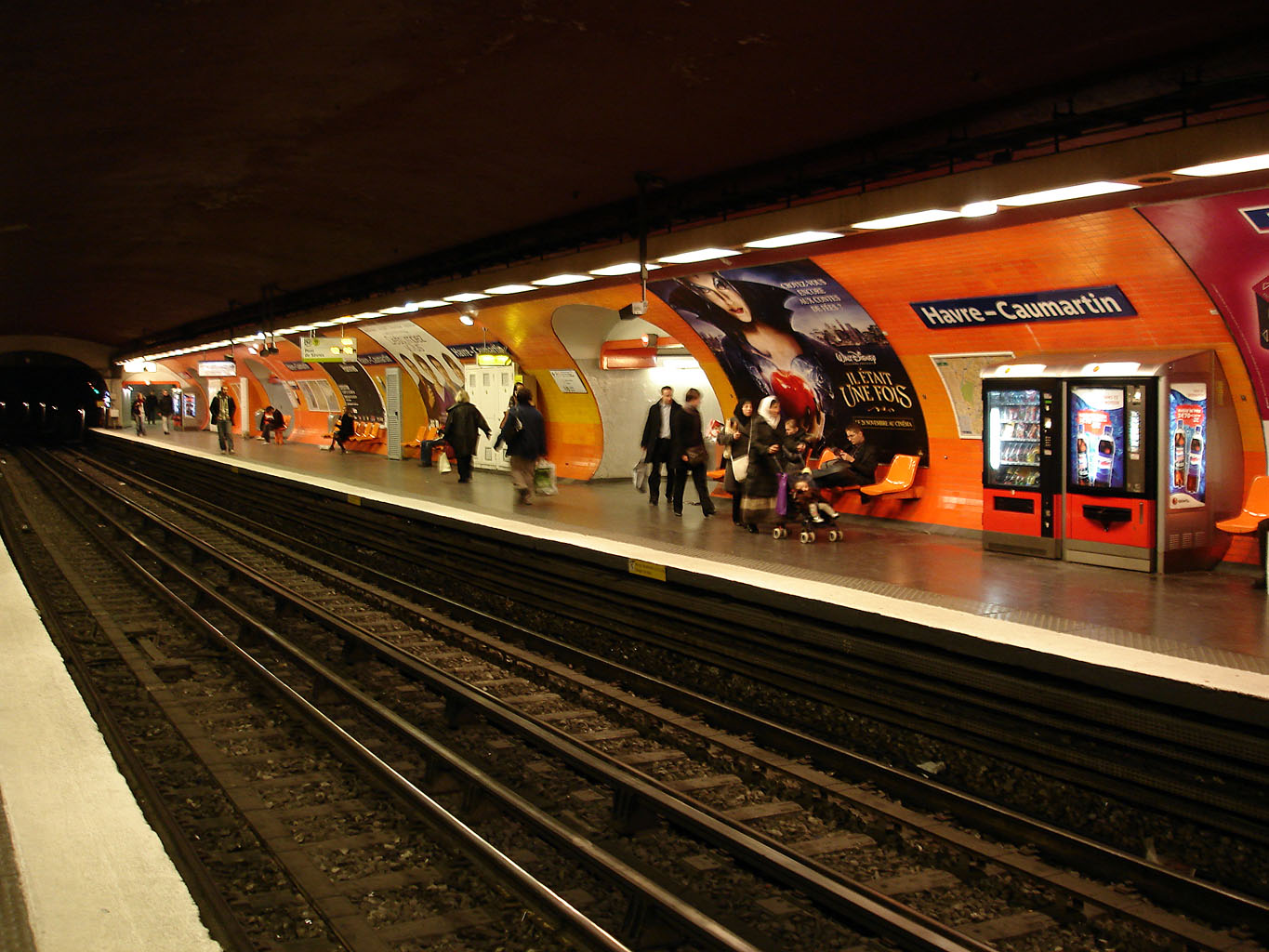
Line 9 platforms at Havre–Caumartin
