= Saint-Philippe du Roule station =

Metro station in Paris, France

Saint-Philippe du Roule
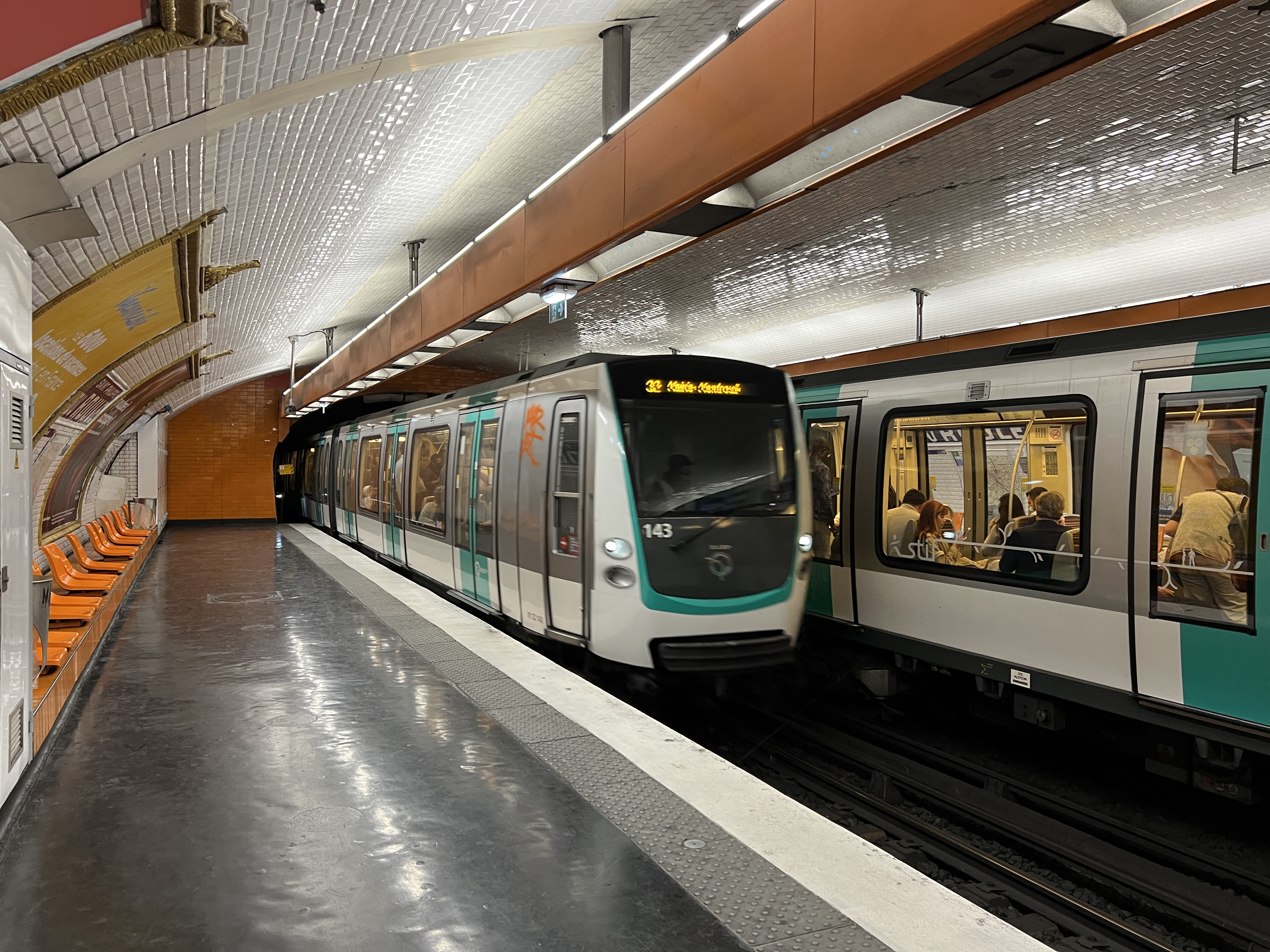
- MF 01 rolling stock at Saint-Philippe du Roule

General information
- Location: 8th arrondissement of Paris; Île-de-France; France
- Coordinates: 48°52′19″N 2°18′36″E
- System: Paris Métro station
- Owner: RATP
- Operator: RATP
- Line: Paris Metro Paris Metro Line 9
- Platforms: 2 (side platforms)
- Tracks: 2

Construction
- Accessible: no

Other information
- Fare zone: 1

History
- Opened: 27 May 1923

Services
Preceding station	Paris Metro	Following station
Franklin D. Roosevelt towards Pont de Sèvres	Line 9	Miromesnil towards Mairie de Montreuil
Location
- Location within Paris

Saint-Philippe du Roule (French pronunciation: [sɛ̃ filip dy ʁul]) is a station on Line 9 of the Paris Métro in the 8th arrondissement.

== History ==
The station opened on 27 May 1923 with the extension of the line from Trocadéro to Saint-Augustin. The village of Roule, which became a suburb in 1722, was a small locality called Romiliacum by Frédégaire, Crioilum by Saint Eligius, then Rolus in the 12th century.

Like a third of the stations on the network, between 1974 and 1984, the platforms of line 9 have been modernised in the Andreu-Motte style, in this case orange. As part of the RATP's Renouveau du métro programme, the station's corridors were renovated on 6 February 2007.

In 2021, ridership gradually increased, with 1,935,004 passengers entering this station, which placed it in 184th position among metro stations for its attendance.

== Passenger services ==
=== Access ===
The station has two entrances divided into three metro entrances on Avenue Franklin D. Roosevelt:

- Access 1 - Rue La Boétie, consisting of a fixed staircase embellished with a mast with a yellow "M" inscribed in a circle, leading to the right of no. 30 of the avenue;
- Access 2 - Franklin D. Roosevelt Avenue, consisting of a fixed stairway entrance also equipped with a yellow "M" mast and an exit by an ascending escalator, located back-to-back facing No. 69.

=== Station layout ===
G	Street Level	Exit/Entrance
B1	Mezzanine	Fare control
B2	Side platform, doors will open on the right
B2	Westbound	← toward Pont de Sèvres (Franklin D. Roosevelt)
B2	Eastbound	toward Mairie de Montreuil (Miromesnil) →
B2	Side platform, doors will open on the right

=== Platforms ===
Saint-Philippe-du-Roule is a standard station. It has two platforms separated by the metro tracks and the vault is elliptical. The decoration is in the Andreu-Motte style with two orange light canopies, benches, tunnel exits, and corridor openings treated with flat orange tiles as well as Motte seats in the same colour. These fittings are combined with the bevelled white ceramic tiles covering the walls and vault. The advertising frames are made of honey-coloured earthenware and the name of the station is also made of earthenware, in the style of the original CMP. It is one of the few stations that still features the Andreu-Motte style in its entirety.

=== Bus connections ===
The station is served by lines 28, 32, 52, 80 and 93 of the RATP Bus Network.

== Nearby ==
North of the station is the fashionable street of Rue du Faubourg Saint-Honoré and the church of Saint-Philippe du Roule. A chapel was established in the district of Bas-Roule, near a leprosarium. It was replaced by a more important church, which was built by Jean-François Chalgrin between 1774 and 1784. The church of Saint-Philippe du Roule was built in the style of a Greco-Roman basilica. It was enlarged by Godde in 1845 and Victor Baltard in 1860. Its pediment, representing Religion and its attributes, is by François-Joseph Duret.

== Gallery ==
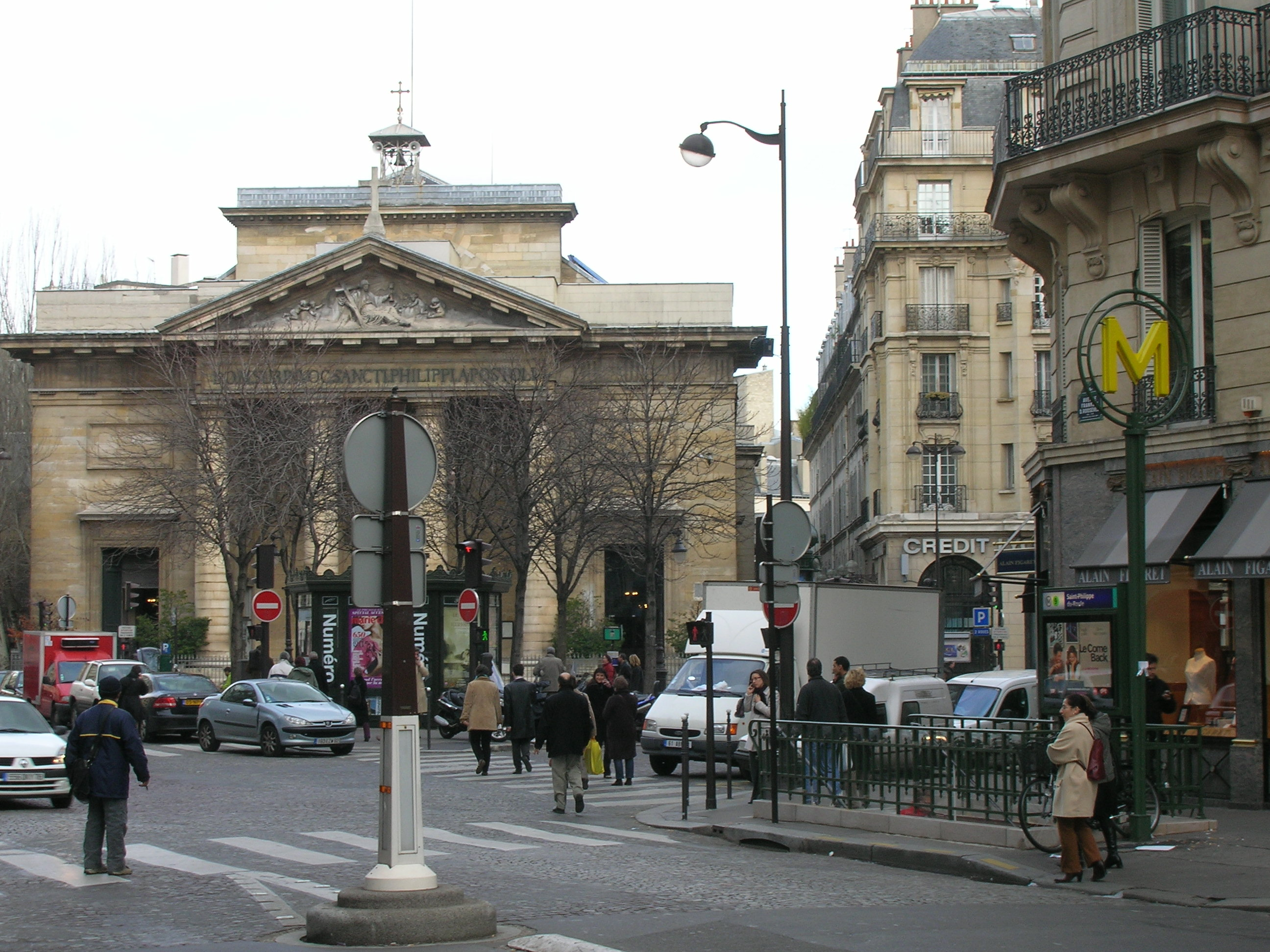
Street-level entrance at Saint-Philippe du Roule

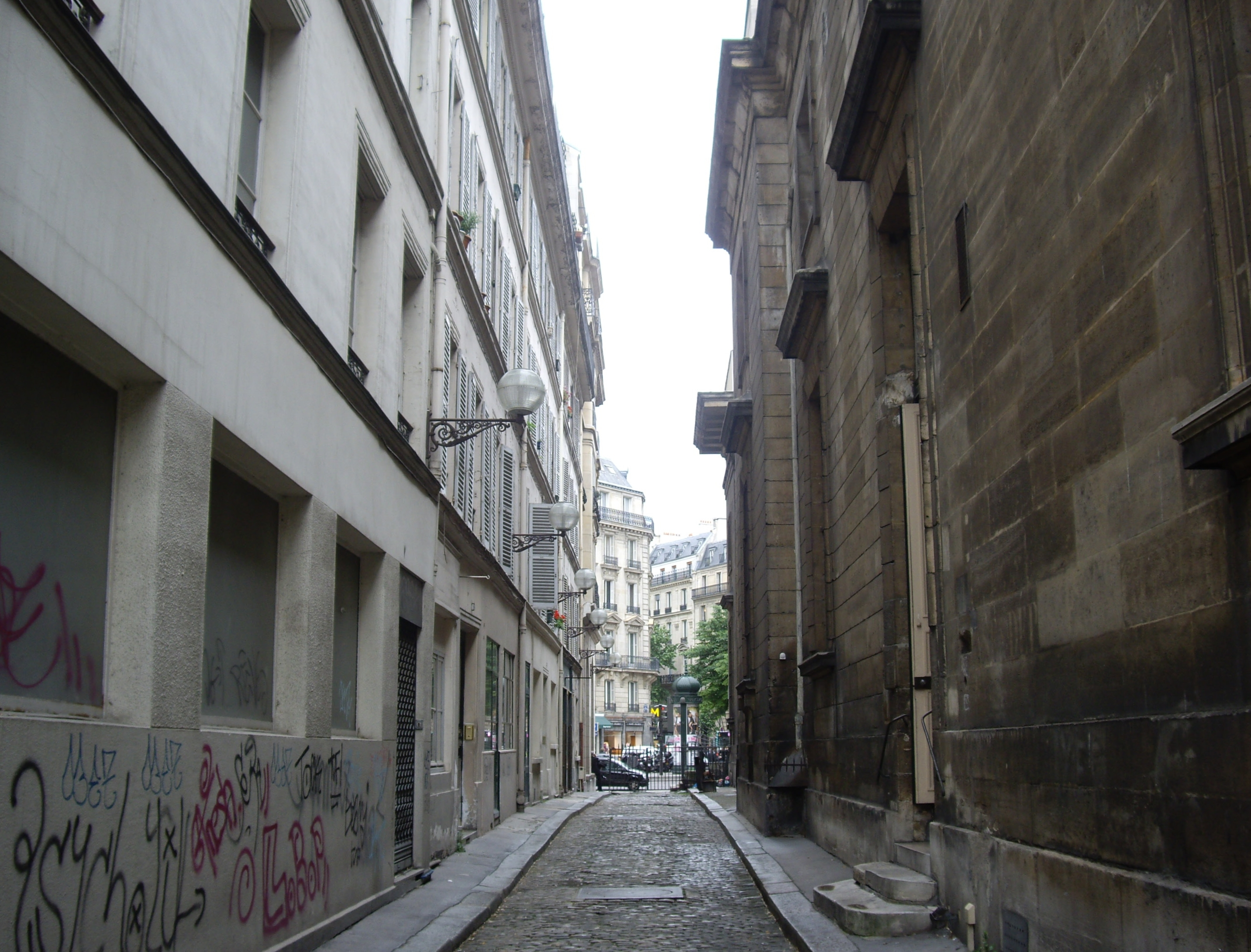
Passage Saint-Philippe-du-Roule

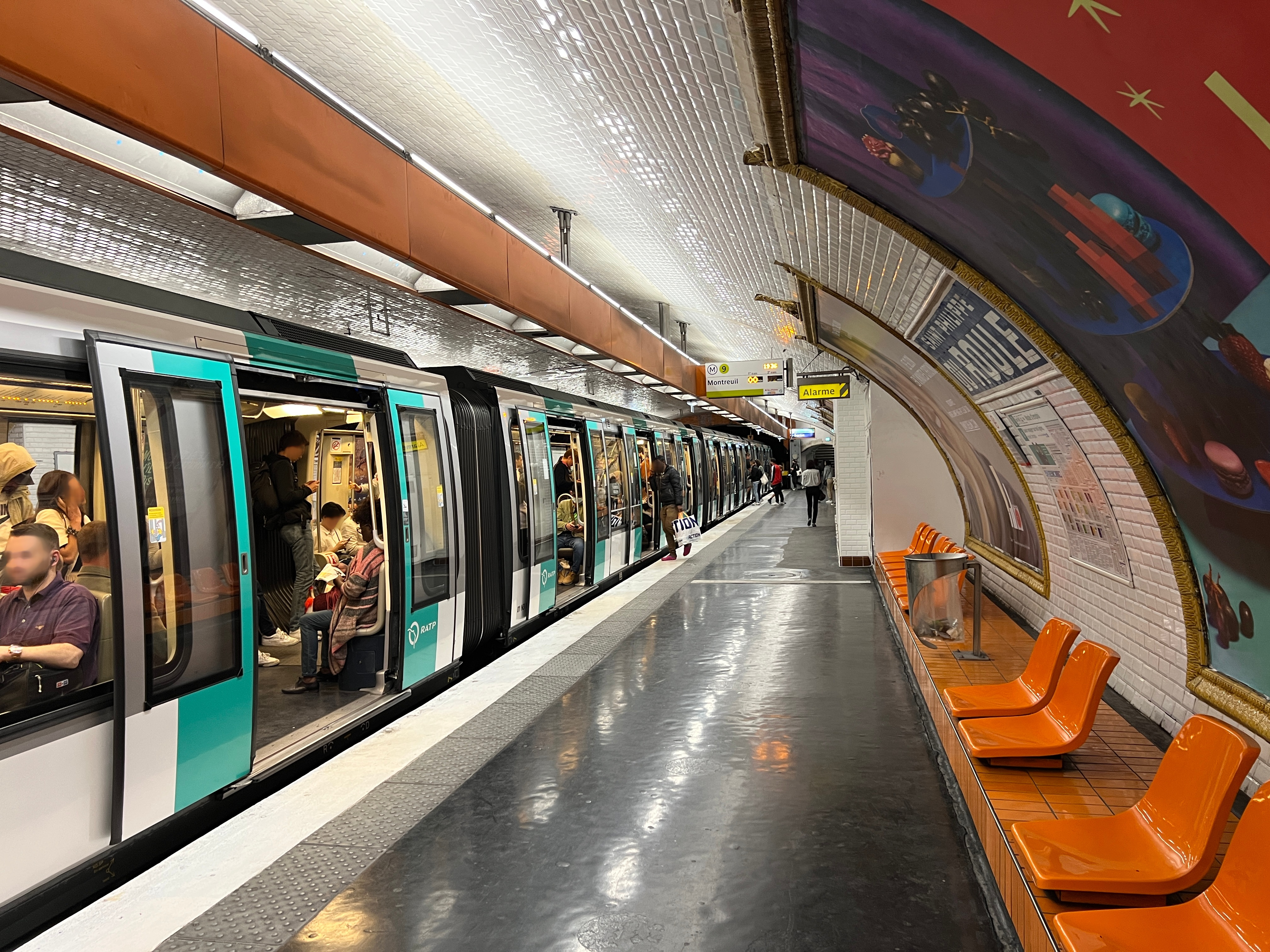
Platforms toward Mairie de Montreuil
