= François-Joseph Duret =

French sculptor

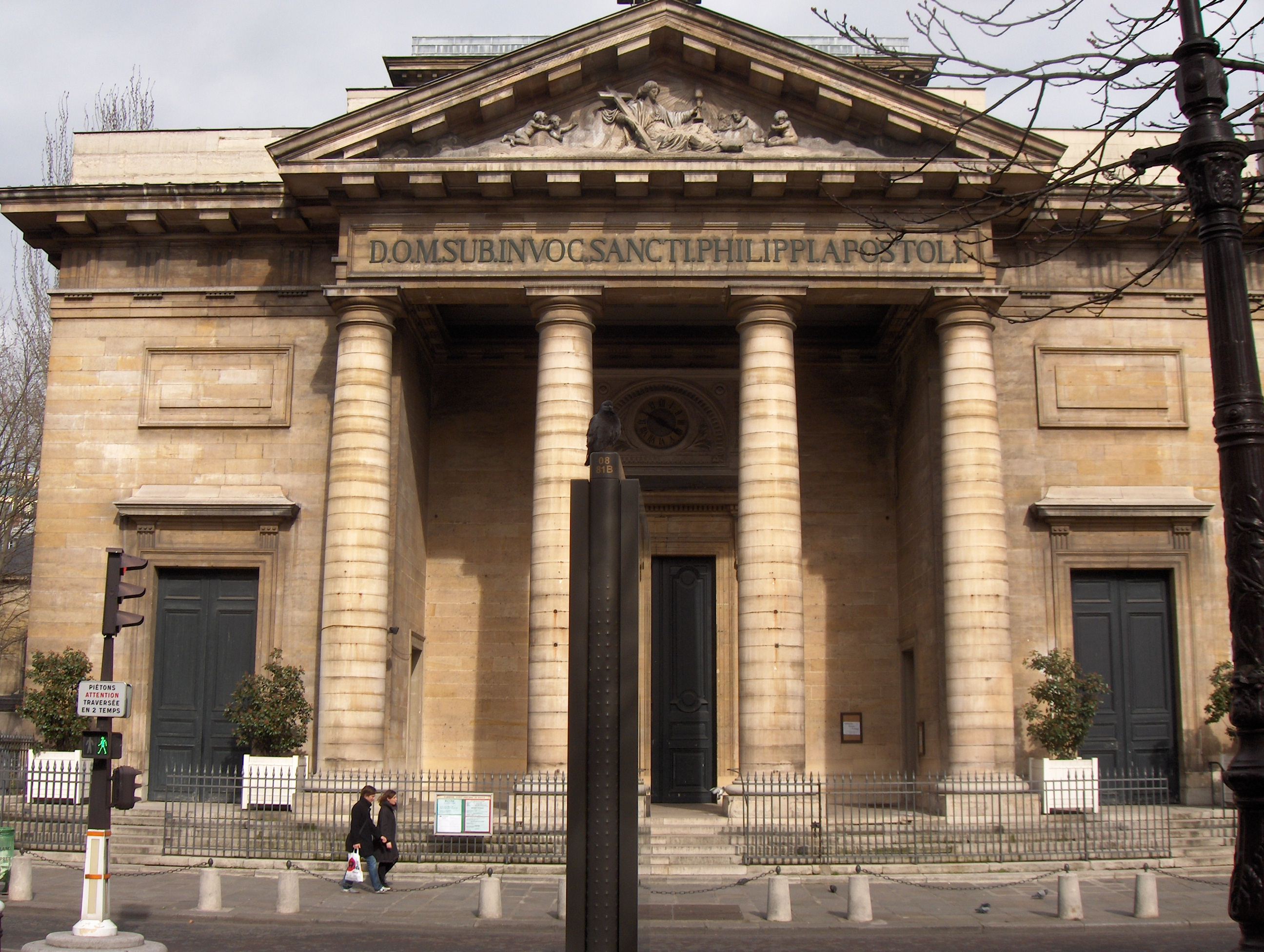
Saint-Philippe du Roule, its pediment representing Religion and its attributes is by François-Joseph Duret

Françoise-Joseph Duret (French pronunciation: [fʁɑ̃swa ʒozɛf dyʁɛ]; 12 November 1729 – 7 August 1816) was a French sculptor. He was the father and teacher of Francisque Joseph Duret.

Born at Valenciennes, the son of Charles Durez, of Spanish origin, Duret was prince of the Academy of St. Luke, a member of the Académie royale de peinture et de sculpture, and sculptor and decorator for Honoré Armand de Villars. His reception piece at the Academy, representing Diogenes looking for a man, is at the Museum of Fine Arts of Valenciennes. He married the daughter of his brother Jean-François Last. Joseph Duret had had several children all of whom died, before his son Francisque Joseph Duret survived, and became a renowned artist in his own right.
