= Champs-Élysées–Clemenceau station =

Paris Métro station

Champs-Élysées Clemenceau Grand Palais
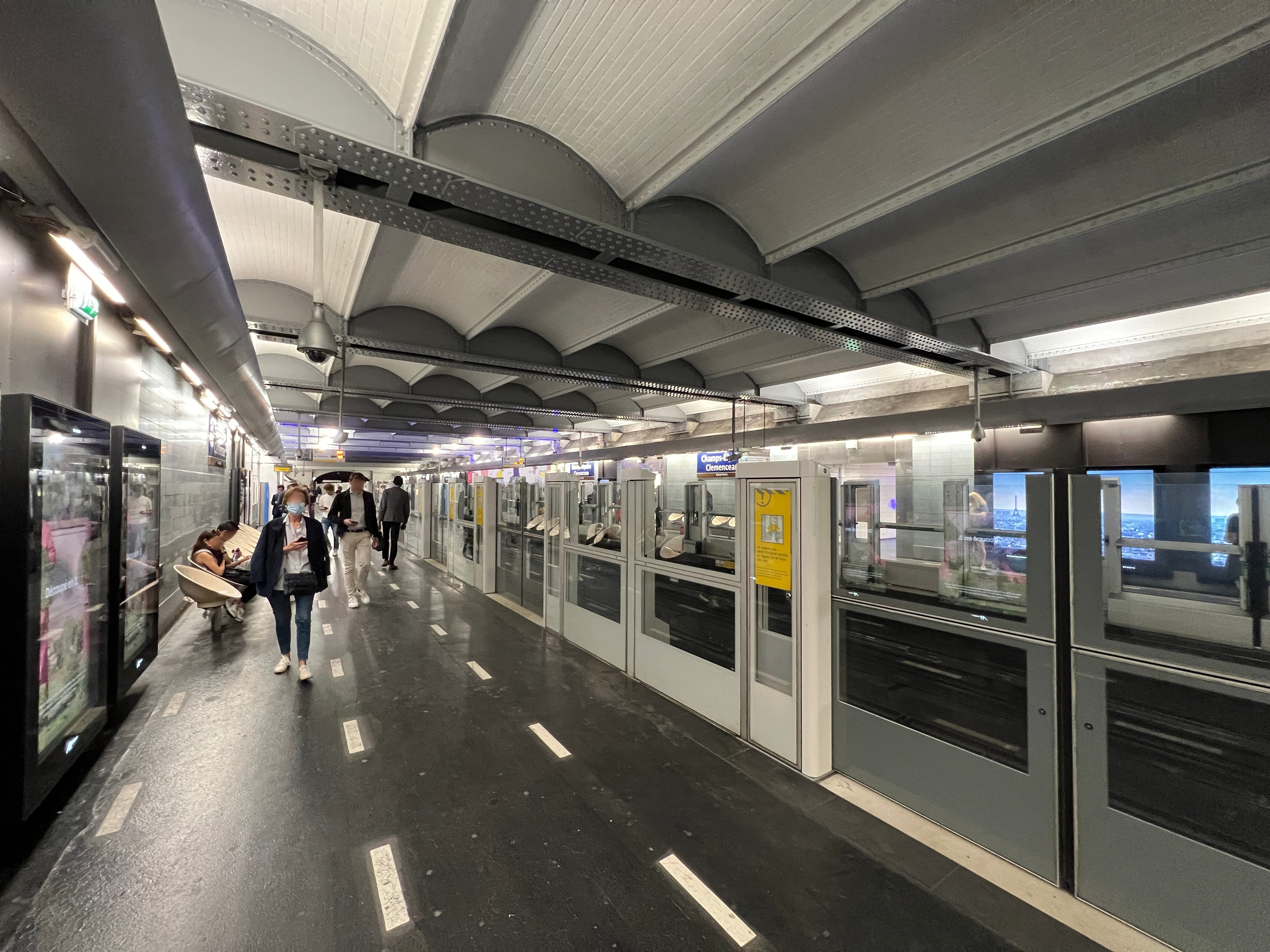
- Line 1 platforms

General information
- Location: Place Clemenceau; 8th arrondissement of Paris; Île-de-France; France
- Coordinates: 48°52′03″N 2°18′49″E
- Owner: RATP
- Operator: RATP
- Line: Paris Metro Paris Metro Line 1 Paris Metro Line 13
- Platforms: 4 (side platforms)
- Tracks: 4

Construction
- Accessible: no

Other information
- Fare zone: 1

History
- Opened: 19 July 1900 (Line 1); 18 February 1975 (Line 13)
- Former names: Champs-Élysées (1900–1931)

Services
Preceding station	Paris Metro	Following station
Franklin D. Roosevelt towards La Défense	Line 1	Concorde towards Château de Vincennes
Invalides towards Châtillon–Montrouge	Line 13	Miromesnil towards Les Courtilles or Saint-Denis–Université
Route map
Line 1
Line 13
Location
- Location within Paris

Champs-Élysées–Clemenceau (French pronunciation: [ʃɑ̃z‿elize klemɑ̃so]) is a station on Lines 1 and 13 of the Paris Métro in the 8th arrondissement.

The station, along with Tuileries and Concorde were closed from 17 June to 21 September for the 2024 Summer Olympics.

== Location ==
The station is located under the Avenue des Champs-Élysées and Place Clemenceau, which is located midway along the Champs-Élysées. The square is named after Georges Clemenceau (1841–1929), who was the French Prime Minister from 1906 to 1909 and again from 1917 until 1920. The platforms are situated:

- on Line 1, along the approximate east–west axis of the Champs-Élysées, between the Franklin D. Roosevelt and Concorde Métro stations;
- on Line 13, along an approximate north–south axis west of the square, almost parallel to Avenue Winston-Churchill, between Miromesnil station to the north and Invalides station to the south.

== History ==
The station platforms and access tunnels lie beneath the Avenue des Champs-Élysées and Place Clemenceau. Originally named Champs-Élysées, it is one of the eight original stations opened as part of the first section of Line 1 between Porte de Vincennes and Porte Maillot on 19 July 1900. "Clemenceau" was added to the name in 1931 following the creation of Place Clemenceau. The Line 13 platforms were opened on 18 February 1975 as part of the line's extension from Miromesnil. It was the southern terminus of the line until its extension under the Seine to connect with old Line 14, which was then incorporated into Line 13 on 9 November 1976.

From May 1963 to December 1964, like the majority of stations on Line 1, its platforms were extended to 90 metres to accommodate trainsets of six cars. At the same time, the walls were covered with a metallic bodywork with yellow horizontal uprights and golden illuminated advertising frames, an arrangement which was subsequently supplemented with red Motte style seats.

In 2005, the corridors of the station were completely renovated and received on this occasion a specific cultural plan, as well as the platforms of Line 1, resulting in the removal of the bodywork of the latter.

As part of the automation of Line 1, the latter's platforms were raised during the weekend of 18 and 19 April 2009 in order to be fitted with platform screen doors, which were installed in December 2010. The same year and until 24 March, the station of Line 13 was, with Opéra and Concorde on Line 8 as well as Saint-Lazare on Line 12, one of the four on the network equipped on certain platforms with Ikea sofas, the usual seats being removed for the occasion. The following year, it also received platform screen doors, along with eleven other stopping points for Line 13, as part of the action plan defined in 2010 aimed at improving regularity.

On 16 July 2018, part of the nameplates of the station were temporarily replaced to celebrate the victory of the France team at the 2018 FIFA World Cup, as in five other stations. Champs-Élysées–Clemenceau was humorously renamed Deschamps – Élysées – Clemenceau (losing its subtitle "Grand Palais") in homage to manager Didier Deschamps, who was simultaneously honoured at Notre-Dame-des-Champs on Line 12.

In 2020, with the COVID-19 crisis, 1,735,350 passengers entered this station, which places it in 140th position among metro stations for its use.

== Passenger services ==
=== Access ===
The station has two entrances, each consisting of a fixed staircase coupled with an escalator ascending to the exit:

- entrance 1 - Place Clemenceau - Petit Palais, adorned with a balustrade by Joseph Cassien-Bernard and a Dervaux candelabra, emerging to the south of the said square. A plaque in tribute to Georges Clemenceau is affixed to it.
- entrance 2 - Avenue du Général-Eisenhower - Palais de la Découverte, opened in October 2019, located in the immediate vicinity of this monument and the Théâtre du Rond-Point. A long corridor was created from this entrance to lead to a staircase lined with an escalator from level -3 at the exit of Line 13. The renovated station, more watertight, has public toilets.

In the corridor connecting Line 1 to Line 13, a decoration painted on tiles, the Azulejo géométrique, by the Portuguese artist Manuel Cargaleiro, has been installed in 1995. This work is the result of an artistic exchange organszed between Lisbon Metro companies and RATP. The city of Paris offered Lisbon a Guimard metro entrance, installed at the Picoas metro station on the Lisbon Metro. In return, the RATP received a decoration in Azulejo.

=== Station layout ===
G	Street Level	Exit/Entrance
B1	Mezzanine	Fare control
B2	Side platform with PSDs, doors will open on the right
B2	Westbound	← toward La Défense–Grande Arche (Franklin D. Roosevelt)
B2	Eastbound	toward Château de Vincennes (Concorde) →
B2	Side platform with PSDs, doors will open on the right
B3	Side platform, doors will open on the right
B3	Northbound	← toward Les Courtilles or Saint-Denis–Université (Miromesnil)
B3	Southbound	toward Châtillon–Montrouge (Invalides) →
B3	Side platform, doors will open on the right

=== Platforms ===
The platforms of the two lines are of standard configuration. There are two per stopping point, separated by the metro tracks located in the centre. Each is equipped with platform screen doors.

Line 1 station is flush with the ground. The ceiling is made up of a metal deck, the silver-coloured beams are supported by vertical walls. Light blue glass blocks cover the latter, a unique case on the network, and are complemented by advertising screens as well as special panels from the Palais de la Découverte. The tunnel exits are painted white, as is the ceiling extension of the station since the 1960s when the line was extended to six-car trains. The lighting is semi-direct, projected onto the walls and the vaults above the platforms. The name of the station is inscribed in Parisine font on enamelled plaques. The seats are Akiko style in cream colour.

Line 13 station has an elliptical vault on its northern part, the second, longer part consisting of a concrete ceiling and vertical walls. The decoration is a variation of the Andreu-Motte style with two suspended light canopies and orange Motte seats. The white stretched sandstone tiles are flat and thin, laid vertically on the walls and the vault, while the concrete ceiling is covered with black fire-flocking. The tunnel exits are fitted with thin flat orange ceramic tiles, also laid vertically. The advertising frames are metallic and the name of the station is written in Parisine font on enamelled plates.

=== Bus connections ===
The station is served by bus lines 42, 73, and 93 of the RATP Bus Network and by lines N11 and N24 of the Noctilien night bus service.

== Nearby ==
North of the station is the Théâtre Marigny and the Élysée Palace, the official residence of the President of France. Towards the top of the Champs-Élysées is the Carré Marigny, an outdoor philatelic market. Erected along the outside of Place Clemenceau are statues of victorious world leaders involved in the two world wars: Georges Clemenceau, Charles de Gaulle and Winston Churchill. To the west of the station is the Théâtre du Rond-Point. To the southwest is the German Embassy.

To the south of the station are:

- the Grand Palais, which houses the Palais de la Découverte, the 8th arrondissement police station and the Galeries nationales du Grand Palais;
- the Petit Palais, which houses the Palace of Fine Arts of the city of Paris.

== Gallery ==
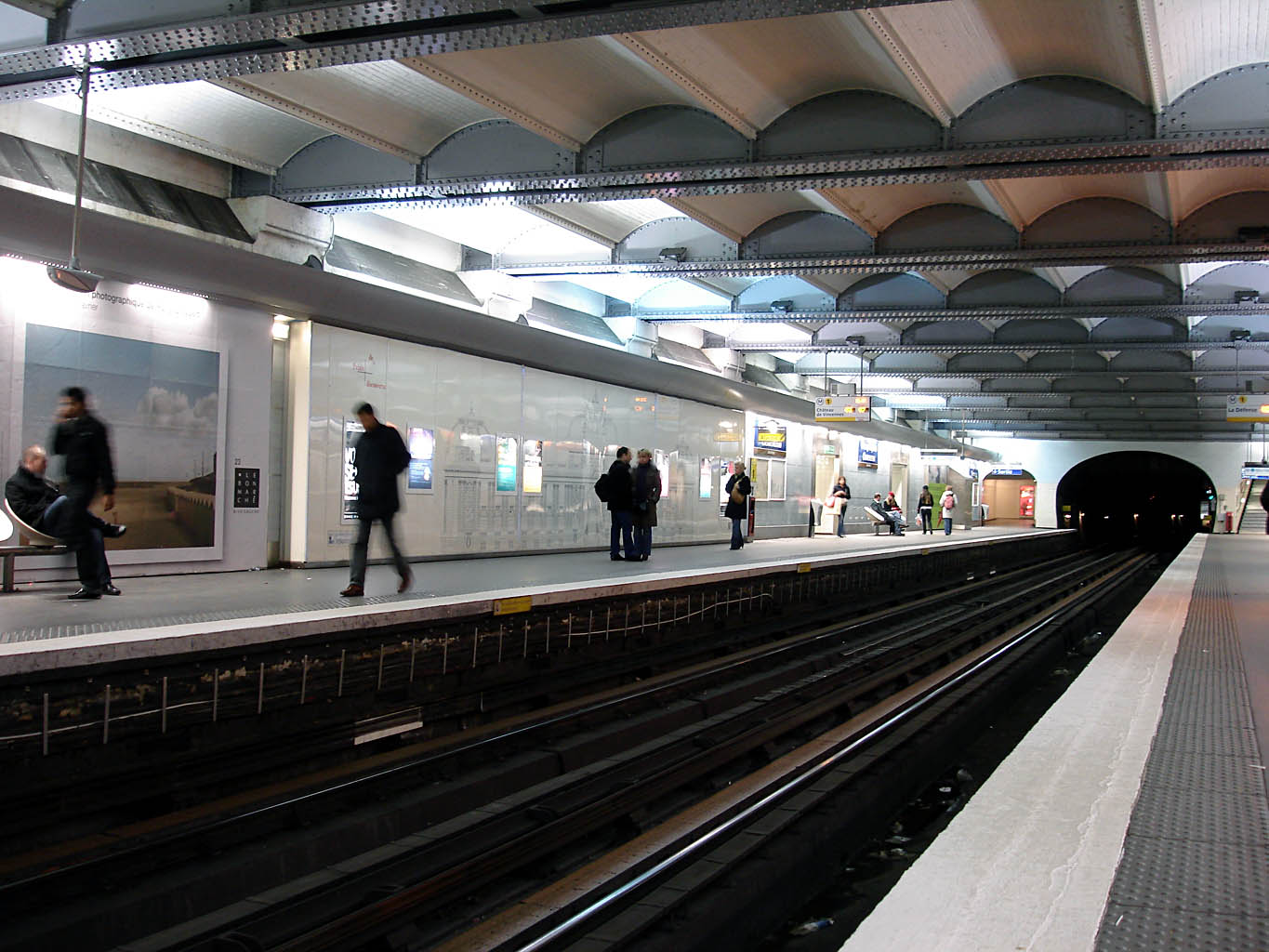
Line 1 platforms

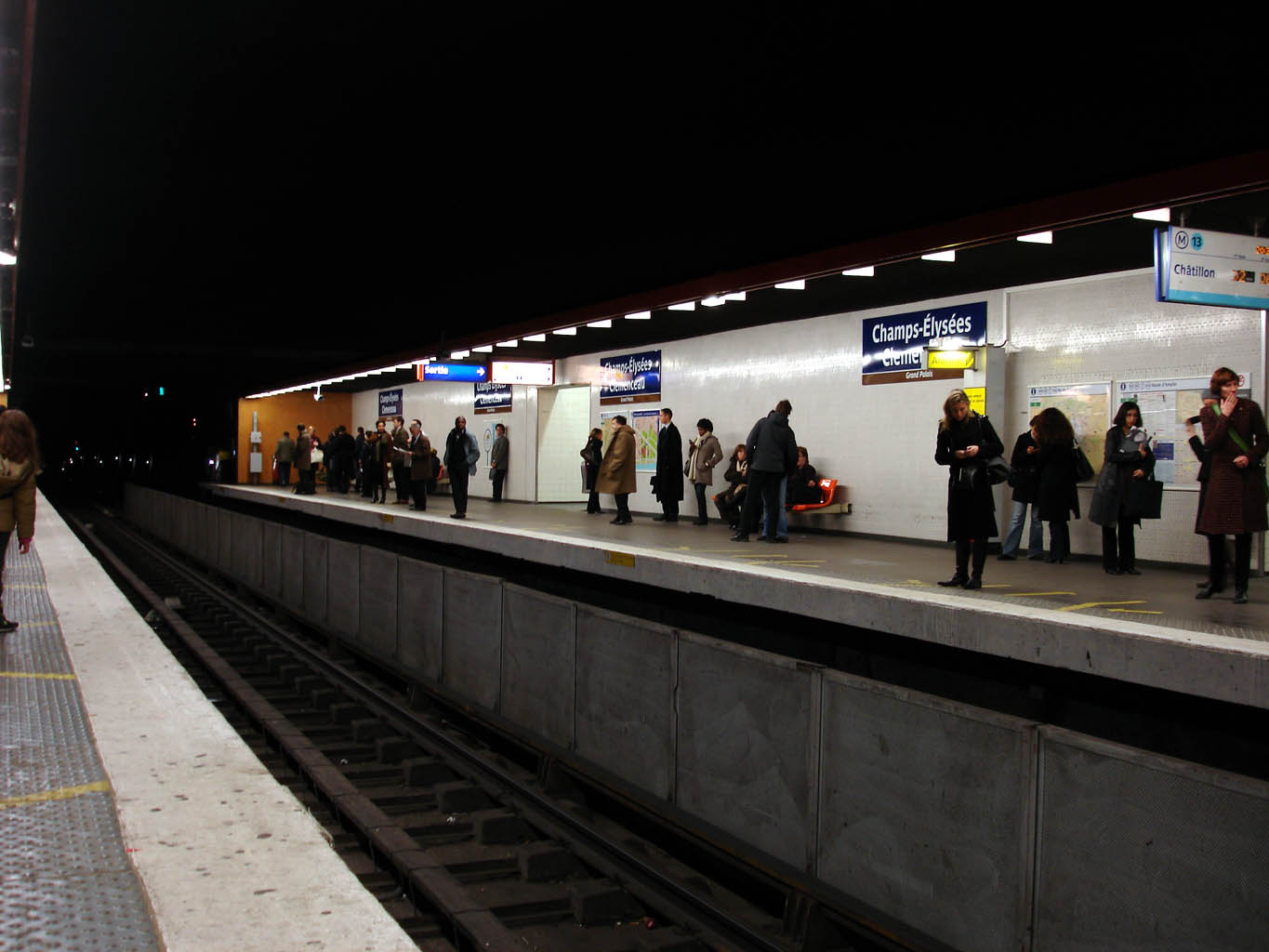
Line 13 platforms
