= Miromesnil station =

Metro station in Paris, France

Miromesnil
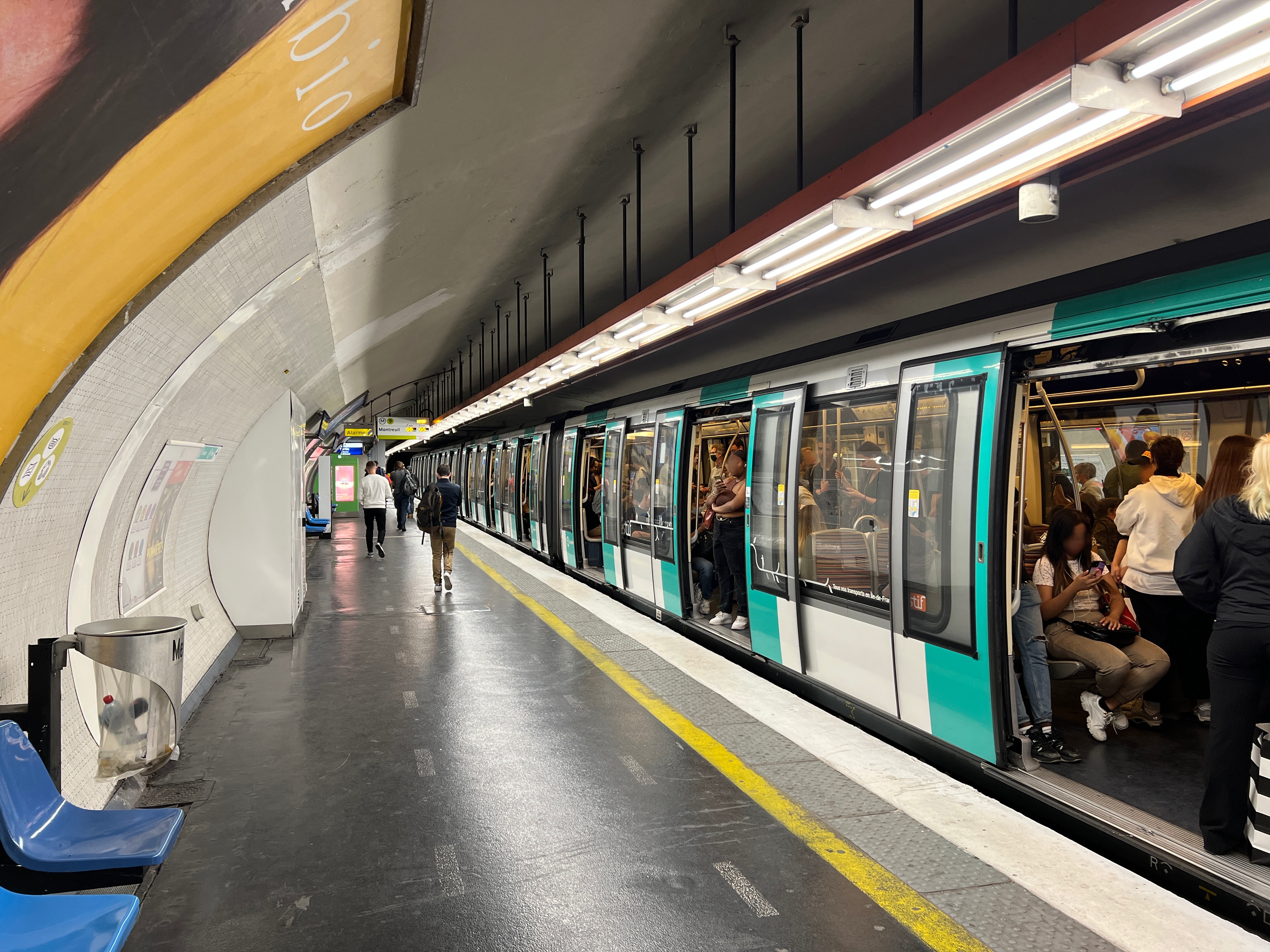
- Line 9 platforms at Miromesnil

General information
- Location: 8th arrondissement of Paris; Île-de-France; France
- Coordinates: 48°52′25″N 2°18′52″E
- System: Paris Métro station
- Owner: RATP
- Operator: RATP

Other information
- Fare zone: 1

History
- Opened: 17 May 1923 (Line 9); 27 June 1973 (Line 13)

Services
Preceding station	Paris Metro	Following station
Saint-Philippe du Roule towards Pont de Sèvres	Line 9	Saint-Augustin towards Mairie de Montreuil
Champs-Élysées–Clemenceau towards Châtillon–Montrouge	Line 13	Saint-Lazare towards Les Courtilles or Saint-Denis–Université
Location
- Location within Paris

Miromesnil (French pronunciation: [miʁomenil]) is a station on Line 9 and Line 13 of the Paris Métro in the 8th arrondissement.

== Location ==
The station is near the intersection of Rue de Miromesnil and Rue La Boétie, the platforms being situated:

- on line 9, under Rue La Boétie between Rue de Miromesnil and the junction of Avenue Percier and Avenue Delcassé;
- on line 13, below the stopping point of line 9, along the north-south axis of the same Avenues.

== History ==
The station opened on 27 May 1923 with the extension of line 9 from Trocadéro to Saint-Augustin. The line 13 platforms opened on 27 June 1973 with the extension of the line from Saint-Lazare. It was the southern terminus of line 13 until its extension to Champs-Élysées – Clemenceau on 18 February 1975. The station is named after the street Rue de Miromesnil, which is named after Armand Thomas Hue de Miromesnil (1723–1796), who was Keeper of the Seals, deputy to the Chancellor of France (Minister of Justice) from 1774 to 1787. He abolished the use of torture during the interrogation of the accused.

The line 13 station is the first in a series of twelve on this line to be equipped with platform doors in order to reduce the risk of passengers falling on the tracks, which is amplified at peak times. The work took place in April 2010 for the preparation of the platforms, then in July of the same year, the installation itself.

In 2020, with the Covid-19 crisis, 2,618,473 passengers entered this station, which places it in the 74th position of metro stations for its use.

== Passenger services ==
=== Access ===
The station has four metro entrances:

- entrance 1: Avenue Percier (odd-numbered side): a curved staircase, a rare feature on the network leading to the corner of Avenue Percier and Rue La Boétie;
- entrance 2: Avenue Delcassé (odd numbered side): a staircase also curved, located at the corner formed by Avenue Delcassé and Rue La Boétie, decorated with a mat with a yellow "M" inscribed in a circle;
- entrance 3: Rue La Boétie (odd-numbered side): two back-to-back staircases on the south sidewalk west of the junction with Rue de Miromesnil, the closest to the latter having a mast with a yellow "M" inscribed in a circle;
- entrance 4: Rue La Boétie (even numbered side): a kiosk established within the building at no. 13, Rue de Miromesnil, which forms the corner with Rue La Boétie; in addition to this rare feature in Paris, it has two unique signals with a yellow "M" inscribed in a circle.

=== Station layout ===
G	Street Level	Exit/Entrance
B1	Mezzanine	Fare control
B2	Side platform, doors will open on the right
B2	Westbound	← toward Pont de Sèvres (Saint-Philippe du Roule)
B2	Eastbound	toward Mairie de Montreuil (Saint-Augustin) →
B2	Side platform, doors will open on the right
B3	Side platform, doors will open on the right
B3	Westbound	← toward Saint-Denis–Université or Les Courtilles (Saint-Lazare)
B3	Eastbound	toward Châtillon–Montrouge (Champs-Élysées–Clemenceau) →
B3	Side platform, doors will open on the right

=== Platforms ===
The platforms of the two lines are of standard configuration. There are two per stopping point, separated by the metro tracks located in the centre. On line 13, the station has vertical upright walls and a horizontal ceiling. On line 9, the station has an ovoid-shaped vault, except at its western end where the walls are vertical and the ceiling is horizontal supported by pillars. This part corresponds to the extension fitted out during the reorganization in 1973, where two large rooms were created to allow a connection with the platforms of line 13.

Lighting is provided by two red canopies suspended on the two lines; small cream-colored ceramic tiles placed vertically cover the walls as well as the tunnel entrances. The vault of line 9 is painted white and the western ceiling treated in off-white, while that of line 13, in concrete, is covered with black fire-flocking. The advertising frames are metallic and the name of the station is inscribed in capital letters on protruding plaques. The seats are Motte style in blue. The platforms of line 13 are equipped with platform screen doors.

=== Bus connections ===
The station is served by lines 22, 28, 32, 43, 52, 80, 84 and 93 of the RATP Bus Network and, at night, by lines N01, N02 and N53 of the Noctilien bus network.

== Nearby ==
- Elysee Palace the official residence of the President of France)
- Ministry of the Interior
- Musée Jacquemart-André

== Gallery ==
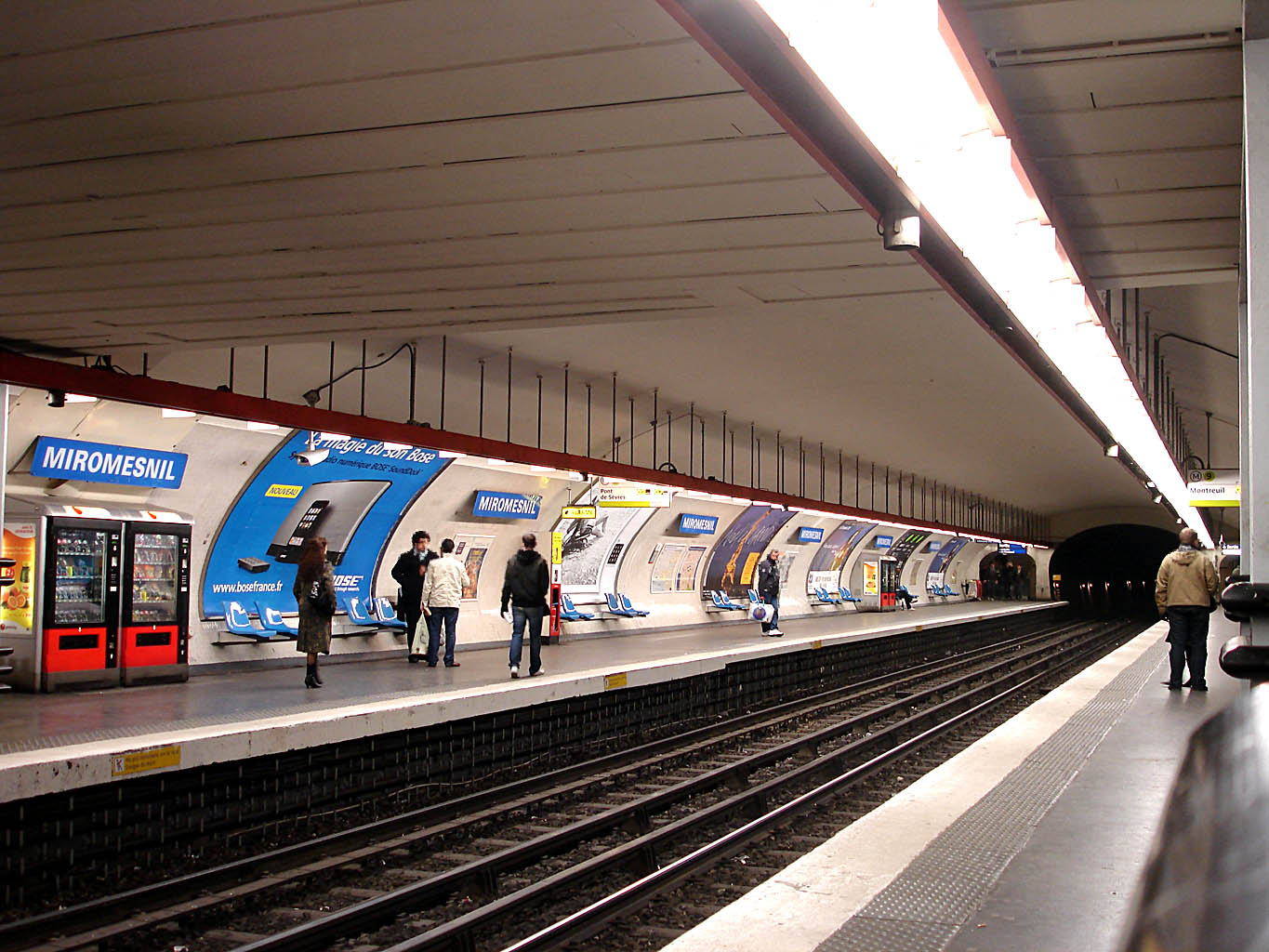
Line 9 platforms at Miromesnil

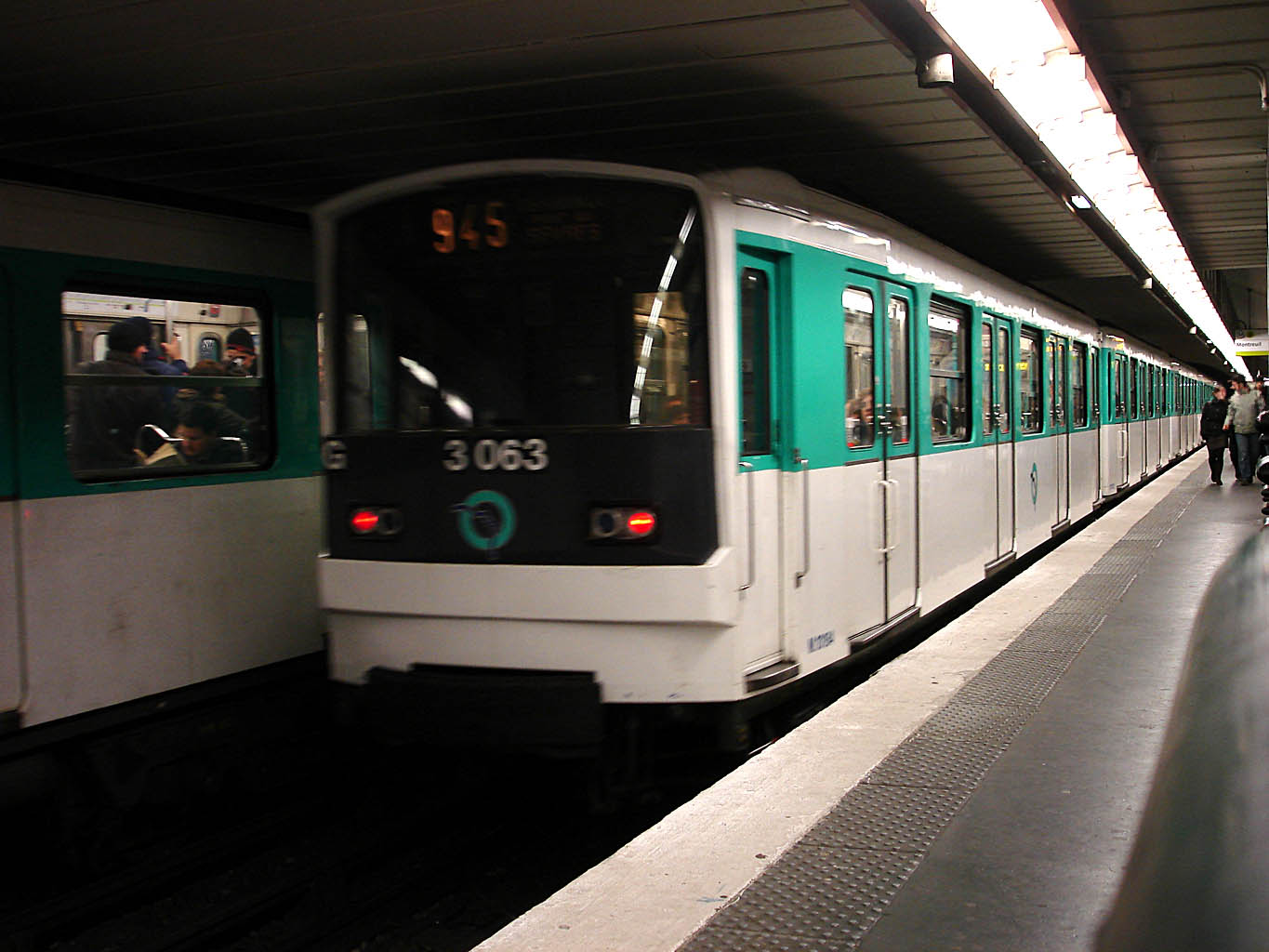
MF 67 rolling stock on Line 9 at Miromesnil

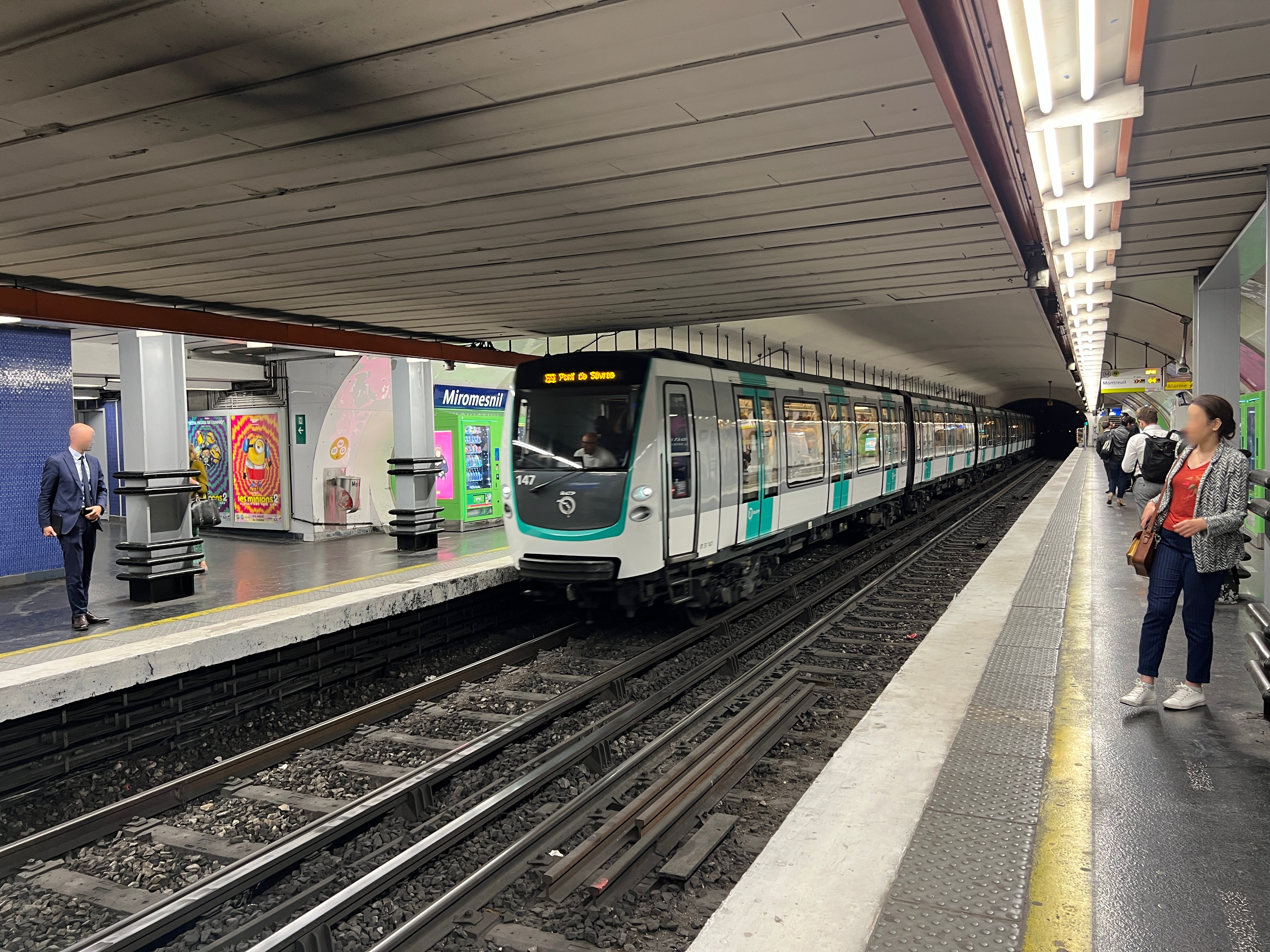
MF 01 rolling stock on Line 9 at Miromesnil

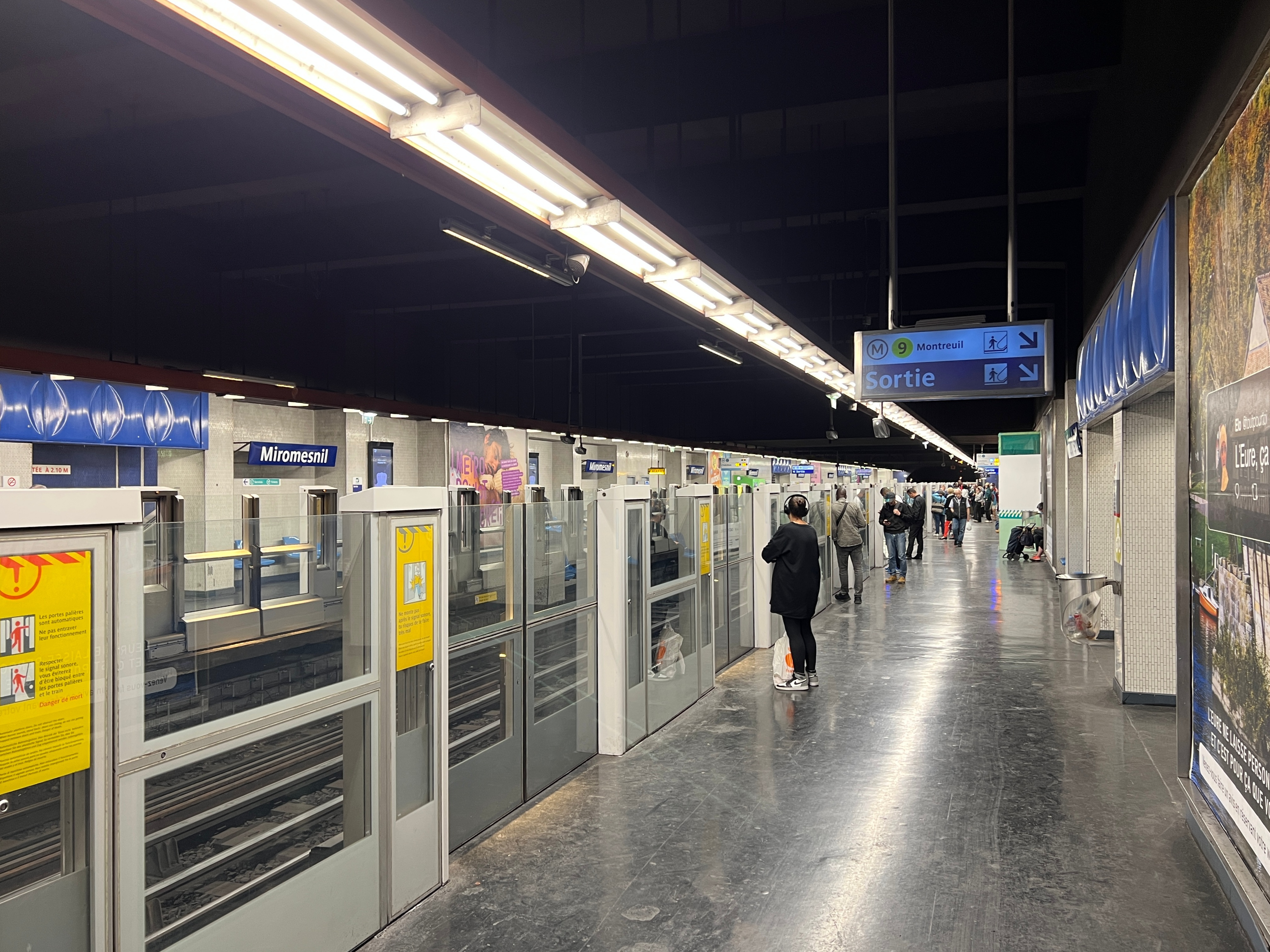
Line 13 platforms at Miromesnil

MF 77 rolling stock on Line 13 at Miromesnil
