= Saint-Augustin station =

Metro station in Paris, France

Saint-Augustin
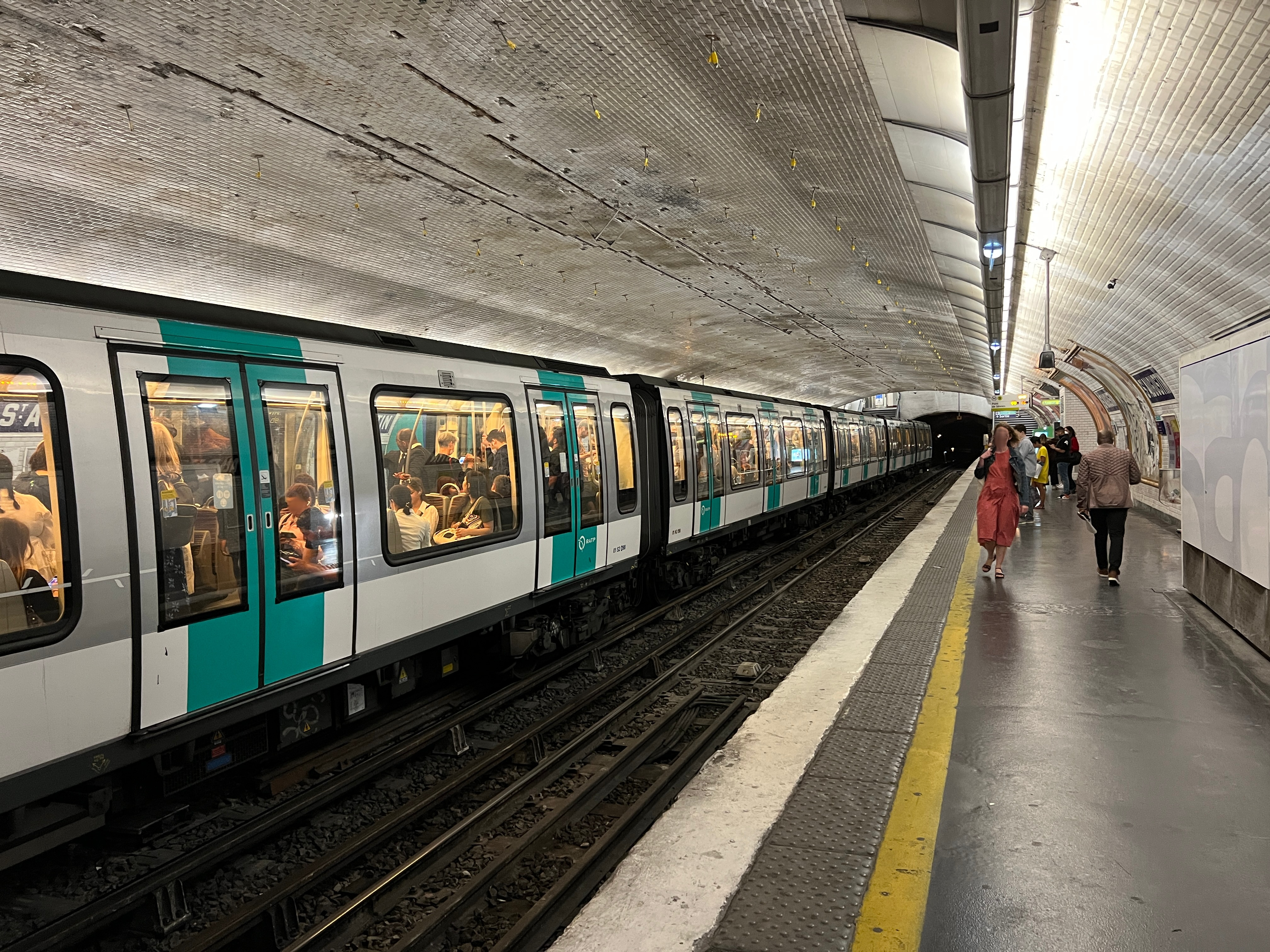
- MF 01 rolling stock at the station in 2022

General information
- Location: 8th arrondissement of Paris; Île-de-France; France
- Coordinates: 48°52′28″N 2°19′20″E
- System: Paris Métro station
- Owner: RATP
- Operator: RATP

Other information
- Fare zone: 1

History
- Opened: 27 May 1923

Services
Preceding station	Paris Metro	Following station
Miromesnil towards Pont de Sèvres	Line 9	Havre–Caumartin towards Mairie de Montreuil
Connections to other stations
Europe towards Pont de Levallois–Bécon	Line 3 transfer at Saint-Lazare	Havre–Caumartin towards Gallieni
Madeleine towards Mairie d'Issy	Line 12 transfer at Saint-Lazare	Trinité–d'Estienne d'Orves towards Mairie d'Aubervilliers
Miromesnil towards Châtillon–Montrouge	Line 13 transfer at Saint-Lazare	Liège towards Les Courtilles or Saint-Denis–Université
Pont Cardinet towards Saint-Denis–Pleyel	Line 14 transfer at Saint-Lazare	Madeleine towards Aéroport d'Orly
Location
- Location within Paris

Saint-Augustin (French pronunciation: [sɛ̃t‿oɡystɛ̃]) is a station on Line 9 of the Paris Métro. Named after Place Saint-Augustin (itself named after Saint-Augustin church), the station opened on 27 May 1923 with the line's extension from Trocadéro. It is located in the 8th arrondissement.

== History ==
After the extension of Line 14 to Saint-Lazare opened in 2003, the station was connected to Saint-Lazare Métro station (which is near Saint-Lazare railway station) by a long underground passageway. This allows interchange to Line 14 as advertised on RATP maps. There is also connection to Lines 3, 12 and 13 via the Line 14 platforms, but under normal operating conditions these connections are not useful and are not indicated on RATP maps.

== Nearby ==
The current Saint-Augustin church, built in 1868 by Baltard, replaced an old chapel which was also dedicated to St Augustine (354–430).

== Station layout ==
G	Street Level	Exit/Entrance
B1	Mezzanine	Fare control
B2	Side platform, doors will open on the right
B2	Westbound	← toward Pont de Sèvres (Miromesnil)
B2	Eastbound	toward Mairie de Montreuil (Havre–Caumartin) →
B2	Side platform, doors will open on the right
