= Rue Royale, Paris =

Street in Paris, France

Rue Royale
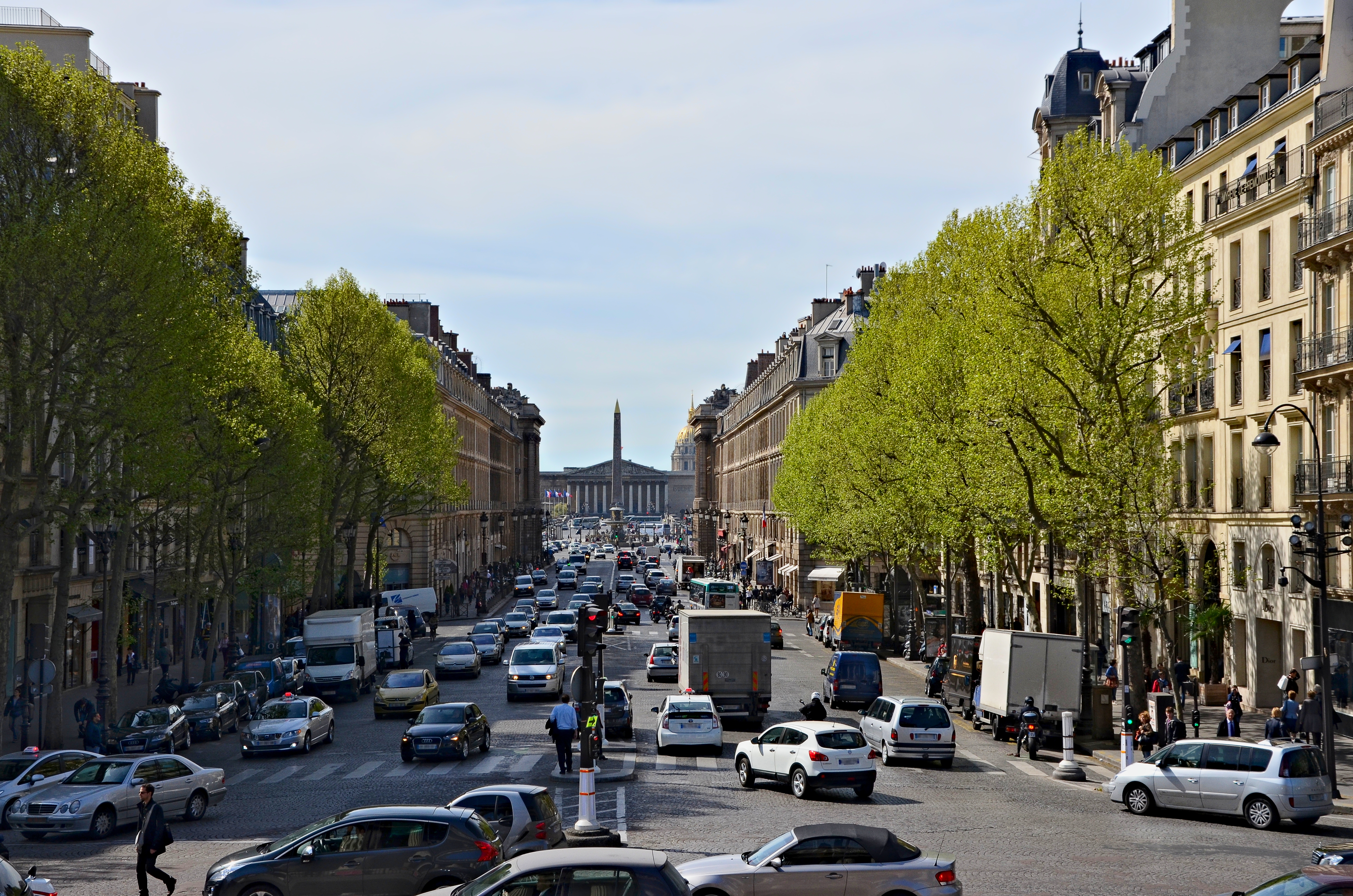
- Rue Royale from the Place de la Madeleine to the Place de la Concorde

- Location within Paris
- Length: 282 m (925 ft)
- Width: 22.8 m (75 ft) between the Place de la Concorde and the Rue du Faubourg Saint-Honoré; 43 m elsewhere
- Arrondissement: 8th
- Quarter: Madeleine
- Coordinates: 48°52′5″N 2°19′23″E
- From: 2 Place de la Concorde
- To: 2 Place de la Madeleine

Construction
- Completion: 1758–1785
- Denomination: 11 March 1768

The Rue Royale (French pronunciation: [ʁy ʁwajal], lit. 'Royal Street') is a short street in the centre of Paris, France, running between the Place de la Concorde and the Place de la Madeleine (site of the Church of the Madeleine). It is in Paris's 8th arrondissement on the Rive Droite. Looking south through the Place de la Concorde, the street offers a view on the Palais Bourbon across the Seine.

Among the well-known addresses on this street is that of Maxim's restaurant, at no. 3.

== History ==
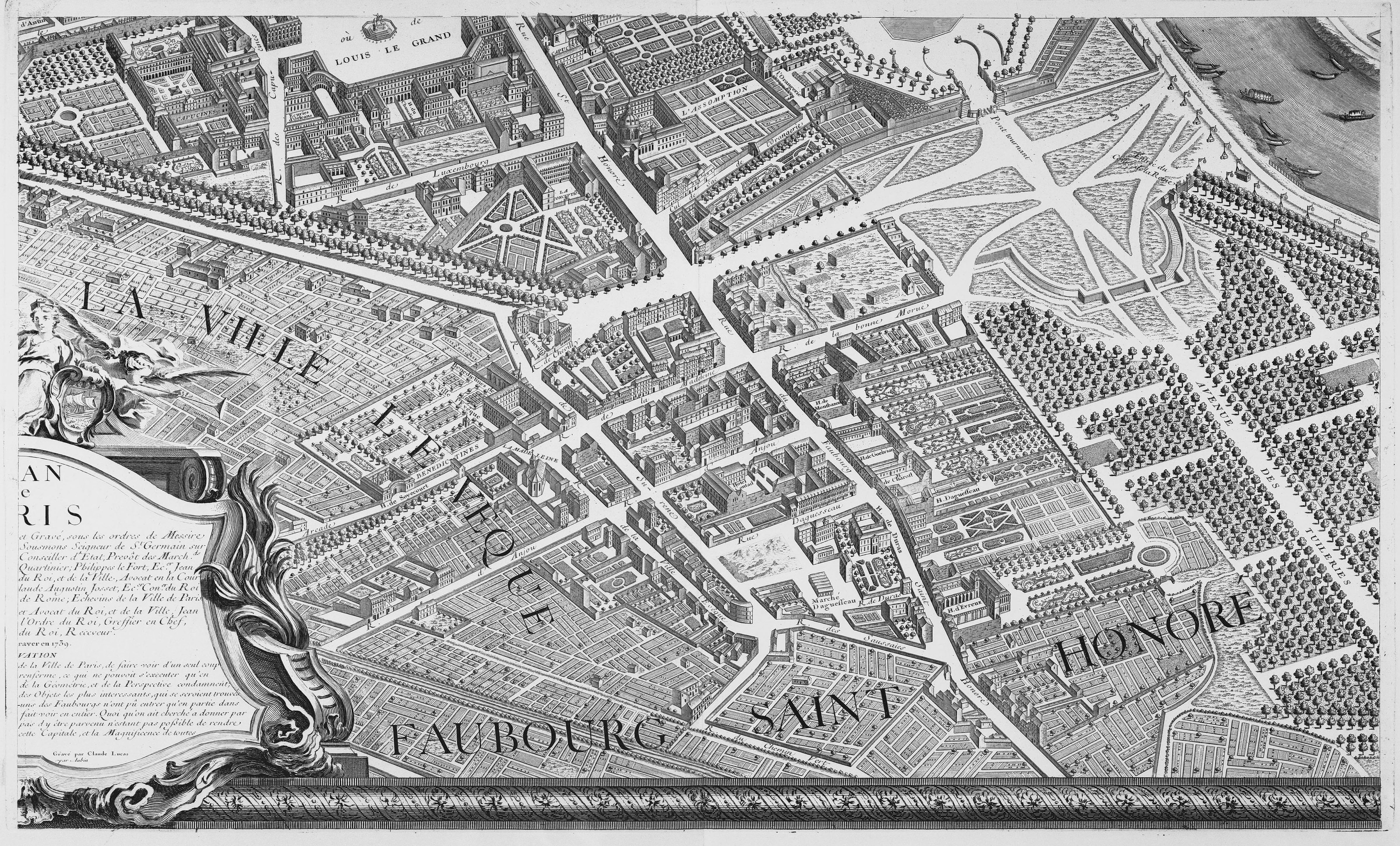
Location of the future Rue Royale on the Turgot plan, 1739.

Originally a simple path along the city walls constructed under Louis XIII, known as the Chemin des Remparts, the street was transformed starting in 1758 under a uniform architectural plan by Ange-Jacques Gabriel. Letters patent of 1757 and 1768 mandated identical façades for buildings between the Place de la Concorde and the Rue du Faubourg Saint-Honoré. The luxury development was largely executed by architect-entrepreneur Louis Le Tellier.

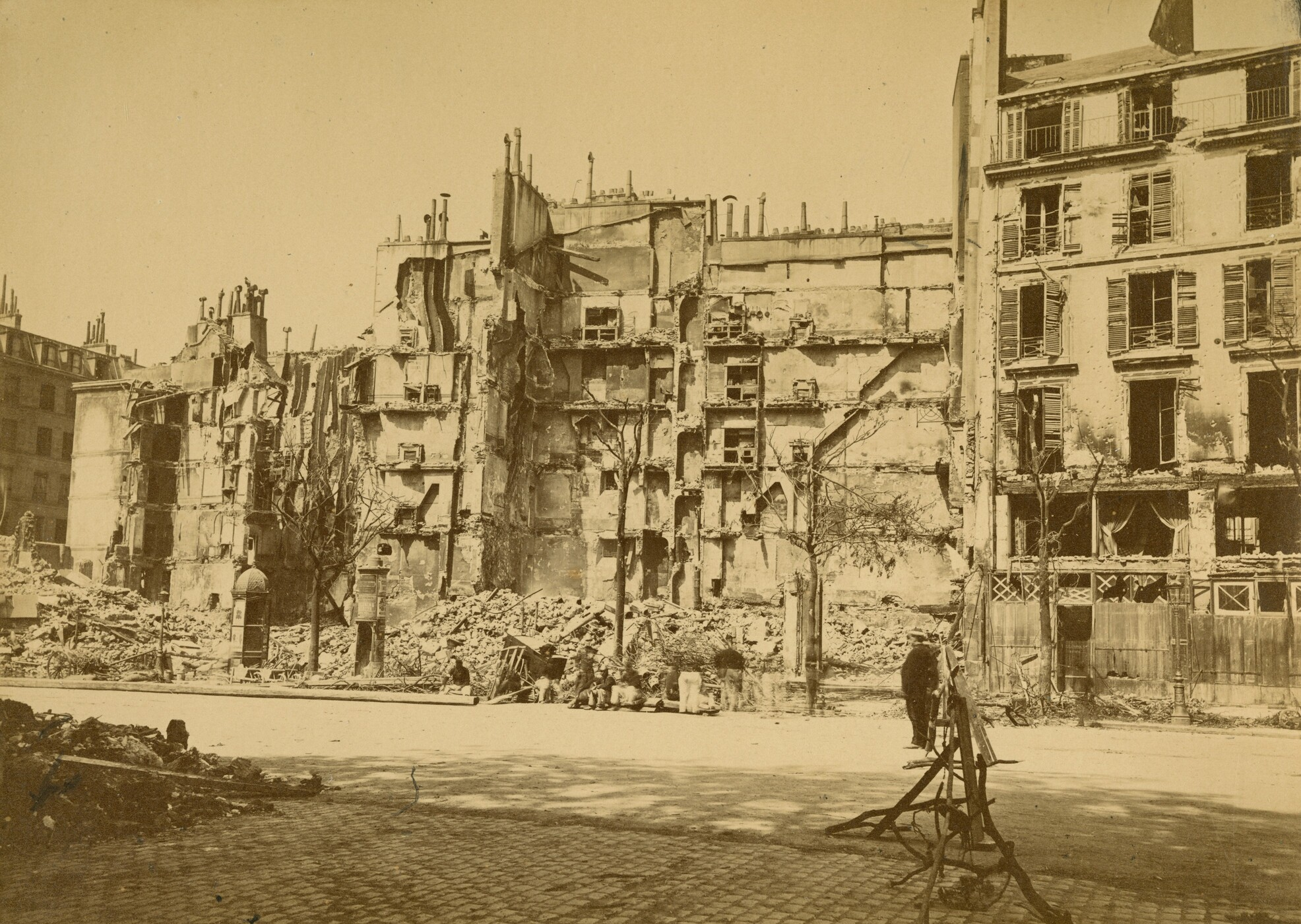
Rue Royale following Commune destruction. Photograph by Alphonse Liebert, 1871

During the French Revolution, it was renamed Rue de la Révolution (1792), then Rue de la Concorde (1795). It regained the name Rue Royale by prefectoral decree in 1830.

In 1824 a royal ordinance extended the street northward to the Madeleine, widening the northern section to 43 metres and creating the Place de la Madeleine.

The street lost its residential character after the Paris Commune (1871), when buildings at nos. 15, 16, 19, 21, 23, 24, 25 and 27 were burned. From the late 19th century it became a centre of luxury commerce, with jewellers moving from the Palais-Royal.

On 12 August 1843, the Rue Royale was the scene for a bizarre phenomenon, when tens of thousands of butterflies landed, causing chaos and swarming the shops and restaurants. The pillars of the Madeleine were, reportedly, "covered".

The street was the site of heavy fighting and damage during the Paris Commune in the spring of 1871.

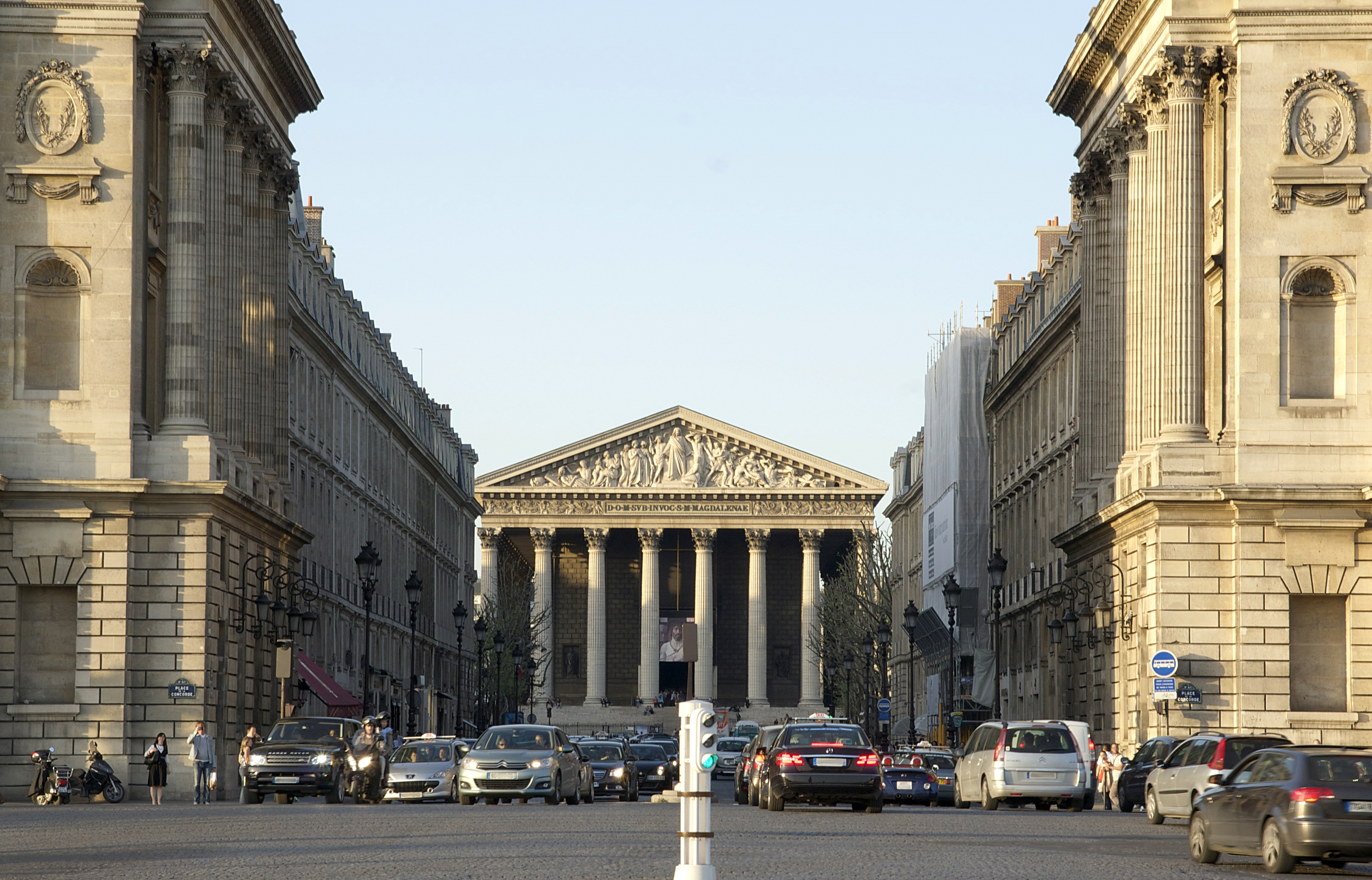
Madeleine rue Royale from Concorde

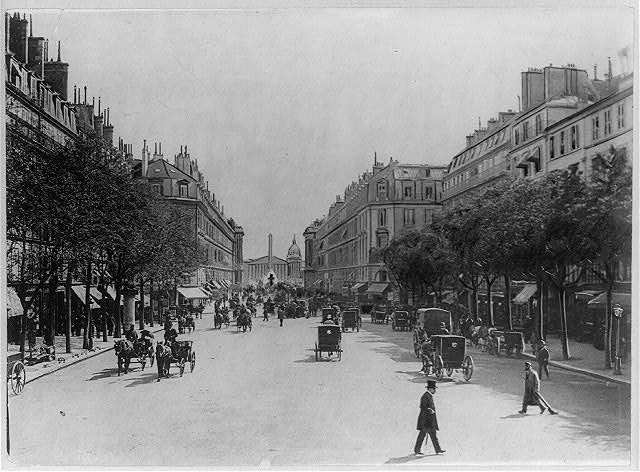
Rue royale (Paris, 1900)

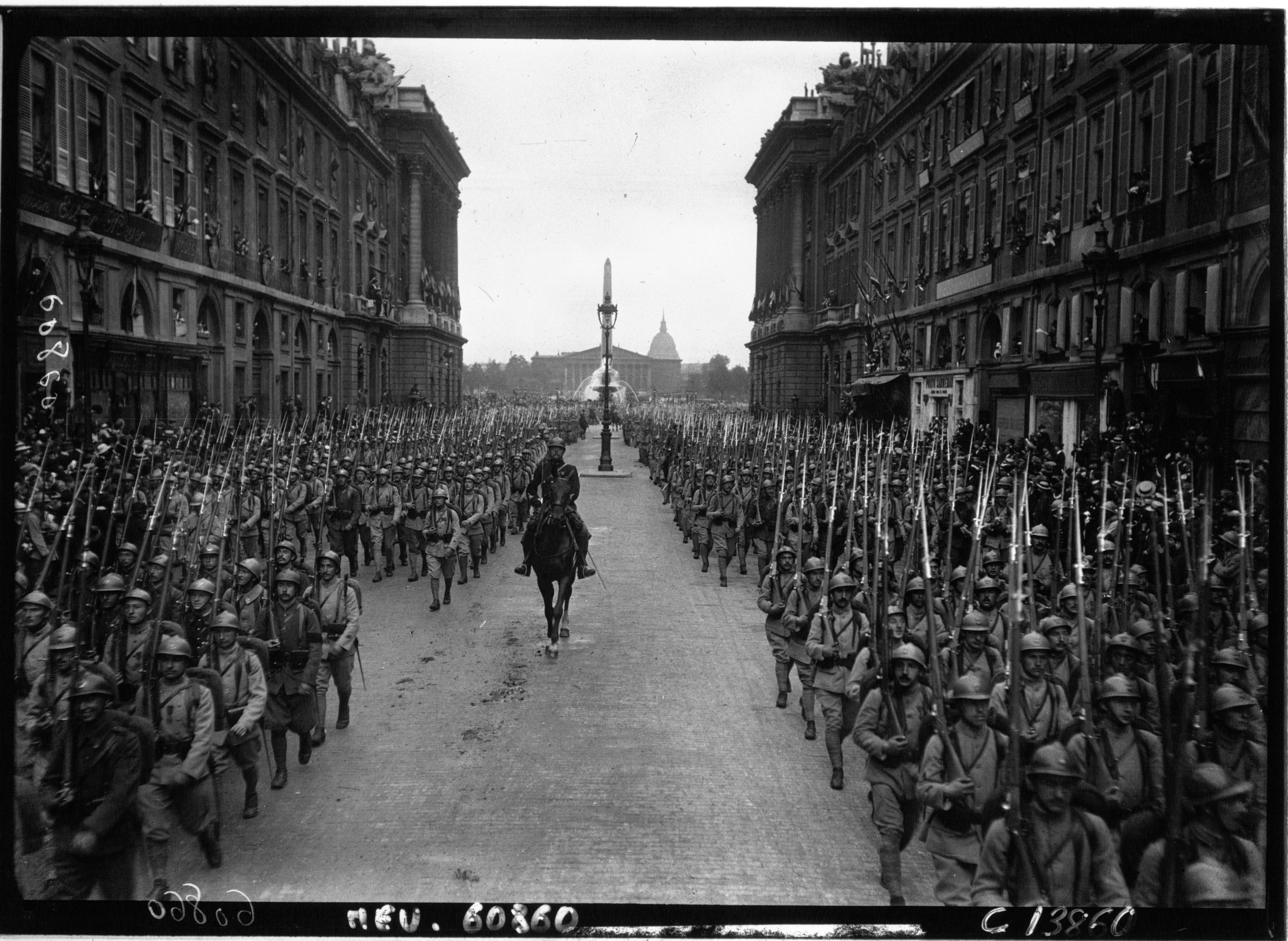
On July 14, 1916, in Paris, the French army infantry paraded down Rue Royale.

== Architecture ==
The street is renowned for its uniform neoclassical façades (five storeys, with the piano nobile on the first floor). The southern terminus is framed by two identical hôtels designed by Gabriel:

- East: Hôtel de la Marine
- West: Hôtel de Crillon (formerly Hôtel des Monnaies)

Most buildings were constructed by Louis Le Tellier (nos. 6, 8, 9, 11, 13) or Étienne-Louis Boullée (no. 3). Several retain original 18th-century interiors.

== Notable addresses ==
- No. 3: Maxim's restaurant, established 1893; Art Nouveau interior (1899).
- No. 6: Hôtel Le Roy de Senneville. Madame de Staël died here on 14 July 1817. Features 1901 décor by Alphonse Mucha for jeweller Fouquet.
- No. 8: Hôtel de La Tour du Pin-Gouvernet; residence of Ange-Jacques Gabriel.
- No. 14: Global headquarters of L'Oréal since 1909.
- No. 15: Heurgon jeweller (founded 1865).
- No. 16: Ladurée pastry shop (founded 1862); rebuilt after 1871 fire; famous for macarons.

== Transport ==
Line 8 of the Paris Métro is under the Rue Royale between stations Concorde and Madeleine.

== See also ==
- Rue Royale in Lyon
- Rue Royale in Brussels
