= Concorde station =

Metro station in Paris, France

Concorde
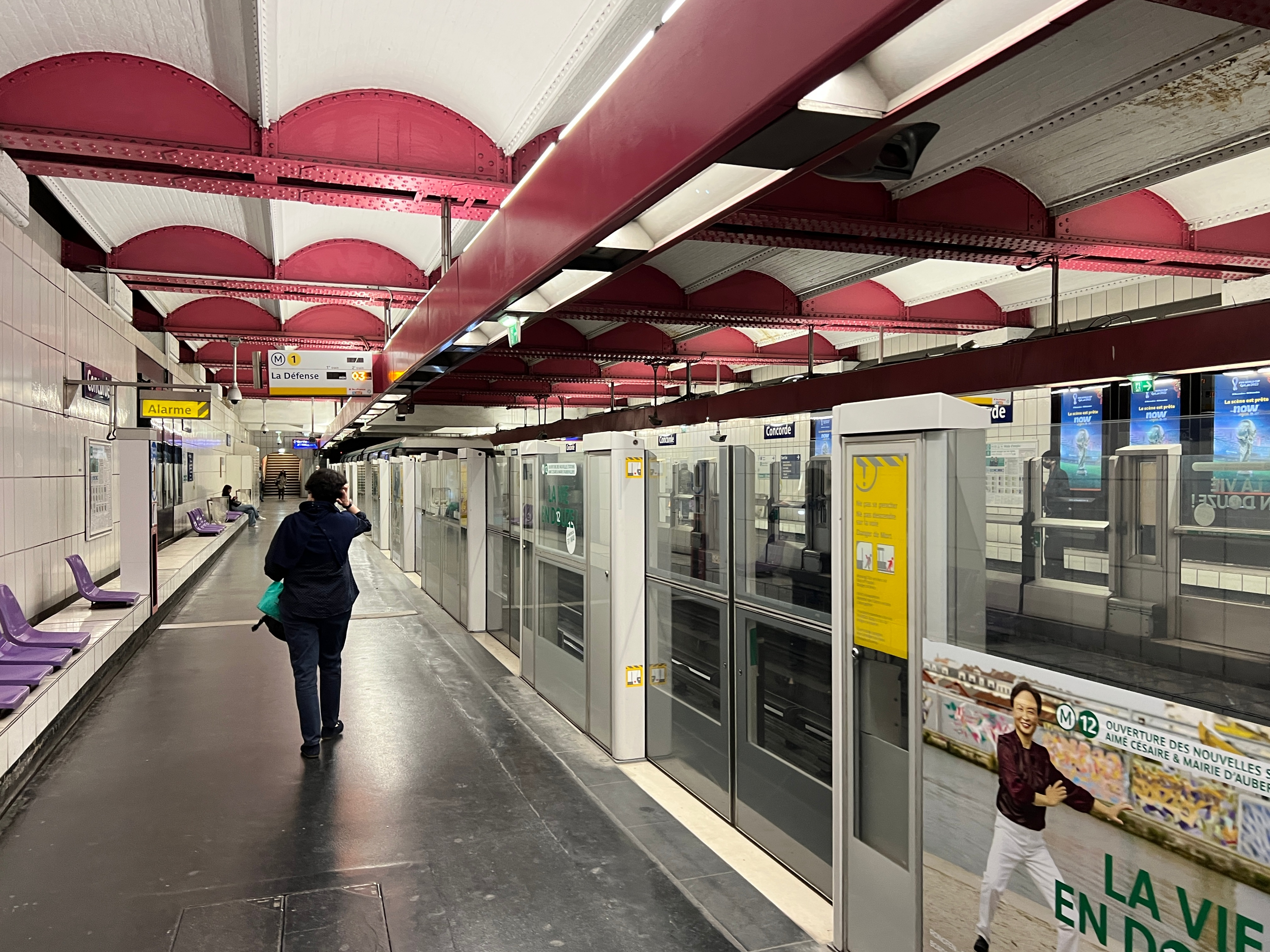
- Line 1 platforms with platform screen doors

General information
- Location: Jardin des Tuileries (two); Place de la Concorde × Rue Royale (two); Place de la Concorde × Rue de Rivoli (two); Rue de Rivoli × Rue de Mondovi; Rue de Rivoli × rue St-Florentin; 1st arrondissement of Paris; Île-de-France; France
- Coordinates: 48°51′55″N 2°19′16″E
- Owner: RATP
- Operator: RATP
- Line: Paris Metro Paris Metro Line 1 Paris Metro Line 8 Paris Metro Line 12
- Platforms: 6 (side platforms)
- Tracks: 6

Construction
- Accessible: No

Other information
- Station code: 1002
- Fare zone: 1

History
- Opened: 13 August 1900 (Line 1); 5 November 1910 (Line 12); 12 March 1914 (Line 8)

Passengers
- 3,401,219 (2021)

Services
Preceding station	Paris Metro	Following station
Champs-Élysées–Clemenceau towards La Défense	Line 1	Tuileries towards Château de Vincennes
Invalides towards Balard	Line 8	Madeleine towards Pointe du Lac
Assemblée Nationale towards Mairie d'Issy	Line 12	Madeleine towards Mairie d'Aubervilliers
Route map
Line 1
Line 8
Line 12
Location
- Location within Paris

Concorde (French pronunciation: [kɔ̃kɔʁd]) is a station on Lines 1, 8, and 12 of the Paris Métro. Serving the Place de la Concorde in central Paris, it is located in the 1st arrondissement.

The station, along with Tuileries and Champs-Élysées–Clemenceau were closed from 17 June to 21 September for the 2024 Summer Olympics.

== History ==
The station opened on 13 August 1900, almost a month after trains began running on the initial section of Line 1 between Porte de Vincennes and Porte Maillot on 19 July 1900. The station was the site of the first accident on the métro. On 19 October 1900, a current capture fault between the contact shoe on the train and the third rail resulted in a short circuit that started a fire. It caused a collision with the following train, injuring 29 passengers and 1 driver.

Line 12's platforms opened on 5 November 1910 as part of the original section of the Nord-Sud Company's Line A between Porte de Versailles and Notre-Dame-de-Lorette.

Ezra Pound wrote in 1914 that his famous Imagist poem, "In a Station of the Metro", was inspired by his impressions upon exiting a train at Concorde three years earlier.

Line 8's platforms opened on 12 March 1914 as part of the initial section of the line from Beaugrenelle (now Charles Michels on Line 10) to Opéra, seven months after the opening of the initial section of the line on 12 July 1913 as the platforms at Concorde and Invalides were not completed at the time.

On 27 March 1931, Line A became Line 12 when It was taken over by its competitor, the Compagnie du chemin de fer métropolitain de Paris (CMP), incorporating it into the Paris Métro.

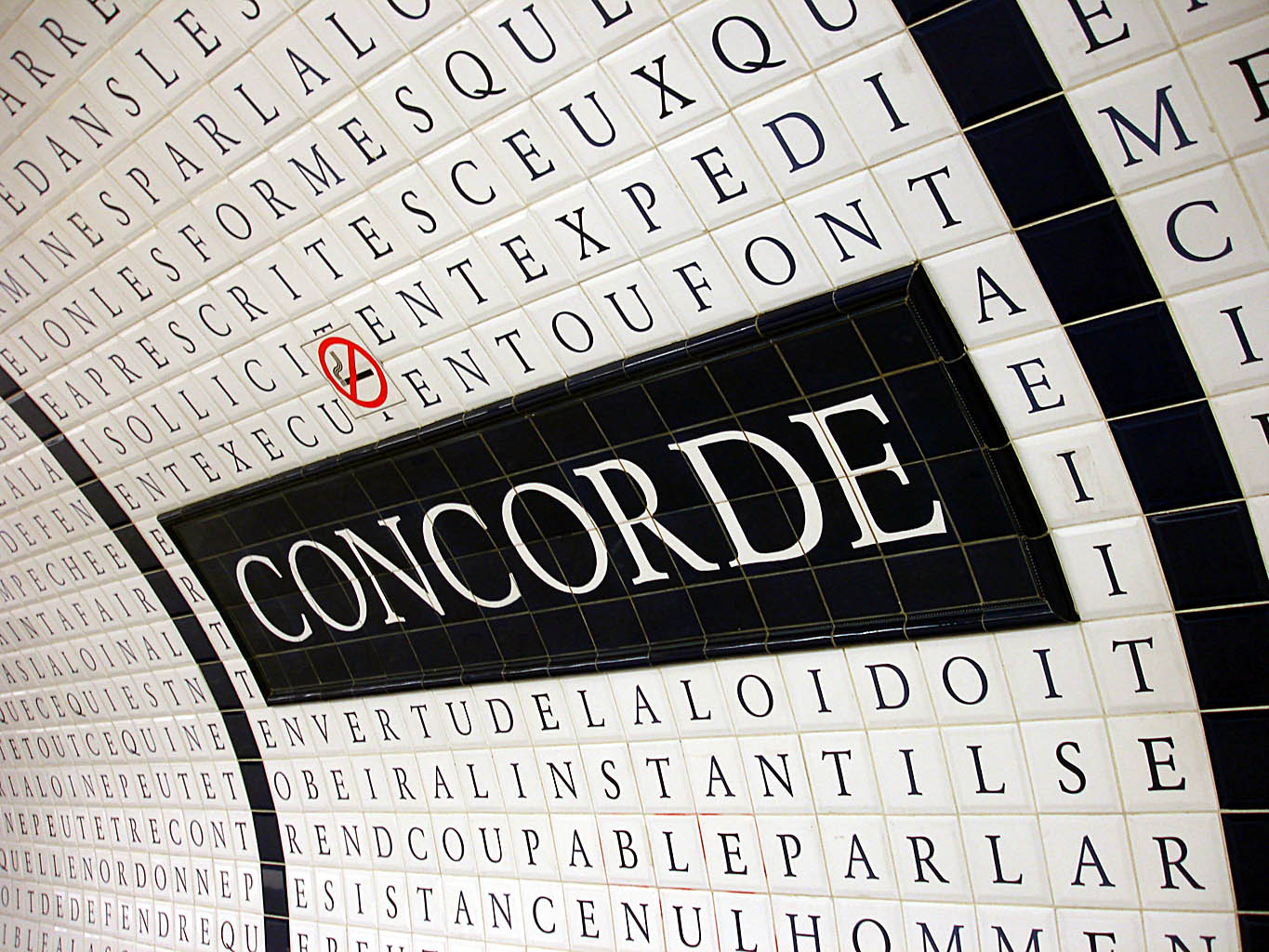
Decoration on Line 12's platforms

The original Nord-Sud decor of Line 12's station was removed in 1991 when it was redecorated by a new artwork by the artist Françoise Schein. It consisted of blue letters set on a white square tile that form the text of the Declaration of the Rights of Man and of the Citizen. The name of the station was also inscribed using the same letters albeit on navy blue tiles. The platforms' vault are covered with horizontal and vertical bands of navy blue tiles and have a speckled-grey tiling on its floors. Numerous metro stations around the world have also been designed with the same theme in mind by the same artist such as: Luz in São Paulo, Parvis de Saint-Gilles in Brussels, Parque in Lisbon, and Westhafen in Berlin.

Up until 1997, Line 8's station had a single dead-end track alongside the platform towards Pointe du Lac. It was removed to create offices.

Over the weekend of 13–14 June 2009, Line 1's platforms were closed to raise its platform levels for the installation platform screen doors to improve passenger safety and for its eventual automation; it was installed in October 2010.

As part of the "Un métro + beau" programme by the RATP, between 11 April to 30 June 2016, Line 8's platforms and lighting were renovated and modernised, requiring a closure of its platforms during that time.

In 2019, the station was used by 6,115,023 passengers, making it the 58th busiest of the Métro network out of 302 stations.

In 2020, the station was used by 2,617,251 passengers amidst the COVID-19 pandemic, making it the 75th busiest of the Métro network out of 304 stations.

In 2021, the station was used by 3,401,219 passengers, making it the 86th busiest of the Métro network out of 304 stations.

== Passenger services ==
=== Access ===
The station has seven accesses:

- Access 1: Jeu de Paume Jardin des Tuileries
- Access 2: Rue de Rivoli
- Access 3: Rue Saint-Florentin
- Access 4: Musée de l'Orangerie Jardin des Tuileries
- Access 5: Rue Cambon
- Access 6: rue Royale
- Access 7: Avenue Gabriel

=== Station layout ===
Street Level
B1	Mezzanine
Line 8 platforms	Side platform, doors will open on the right
Line 8 platforms	Southbound	← toward Balard (Invalides)
Line 8 platforms	Northbound	toward Pointe du Lac (Madeleine) →
Line 8 platforms	Side platform, doors will open on the right
Line 1 platforms	Side platform with PSDs, doors will open on the right
Line 1 platforms	Westbound	← toward La Défense – Grande Arche (Champs-Élysées – Clemenceau)
Line 1 platforms	Eastbound	toward Château de Vincennes (Tuileries) →
Line 1 platforms	Side platform with PSDs, doors will open on the right
Line 12 platforms	Side platform, doors will open on the right
Line 12 platforms	Southbound	← toward Mairie d'Issy (Assemblée Nationale)
Line 12 platforms	Northbound	toward Mairie d'Aubervilliers (Madeleine) →
Line 12 platforms	Side platform, doors will open on the right

=== Platforms ===
All three lines have a standard configuration with 2 tracks surrounded by 2 side platforms, although the lower portion of the side walls on Line 12's platforms are vertical instead of elliptical, as with the other stations constructed by the Nord-Sud company (today on Lines 12 and 13).

=== Other connections ===
The station is also served by lines 42, 45, 72, 73, 84, and 94 of the RATP bus network, and at night, by lines N11 and N24 of the Noctilien bus network.

== Nearby ==
Nearby sites of interest include:

- The Place de la Concorde, namesake for the station, on the right bank of the Seine opposite the National Assembly; as well as the Hôtel de la Marine and headquarters of the Fédération Internationale de l'Automobile on the square.
- To the east of the square is the western end of the Tuileries Gardens, including Galerie nationale du Jeu de Paume and the Musée de l'Orangerie.
- The Embassy of the United States, Paris, as well as the US ambassador's residence at the nearby Hôtel de Pontalba.
- The Embassy of the United Kingdom, Paris, as well as the British ambassador's residence at the nearby Hôtel de Charost.

== Gallery ==
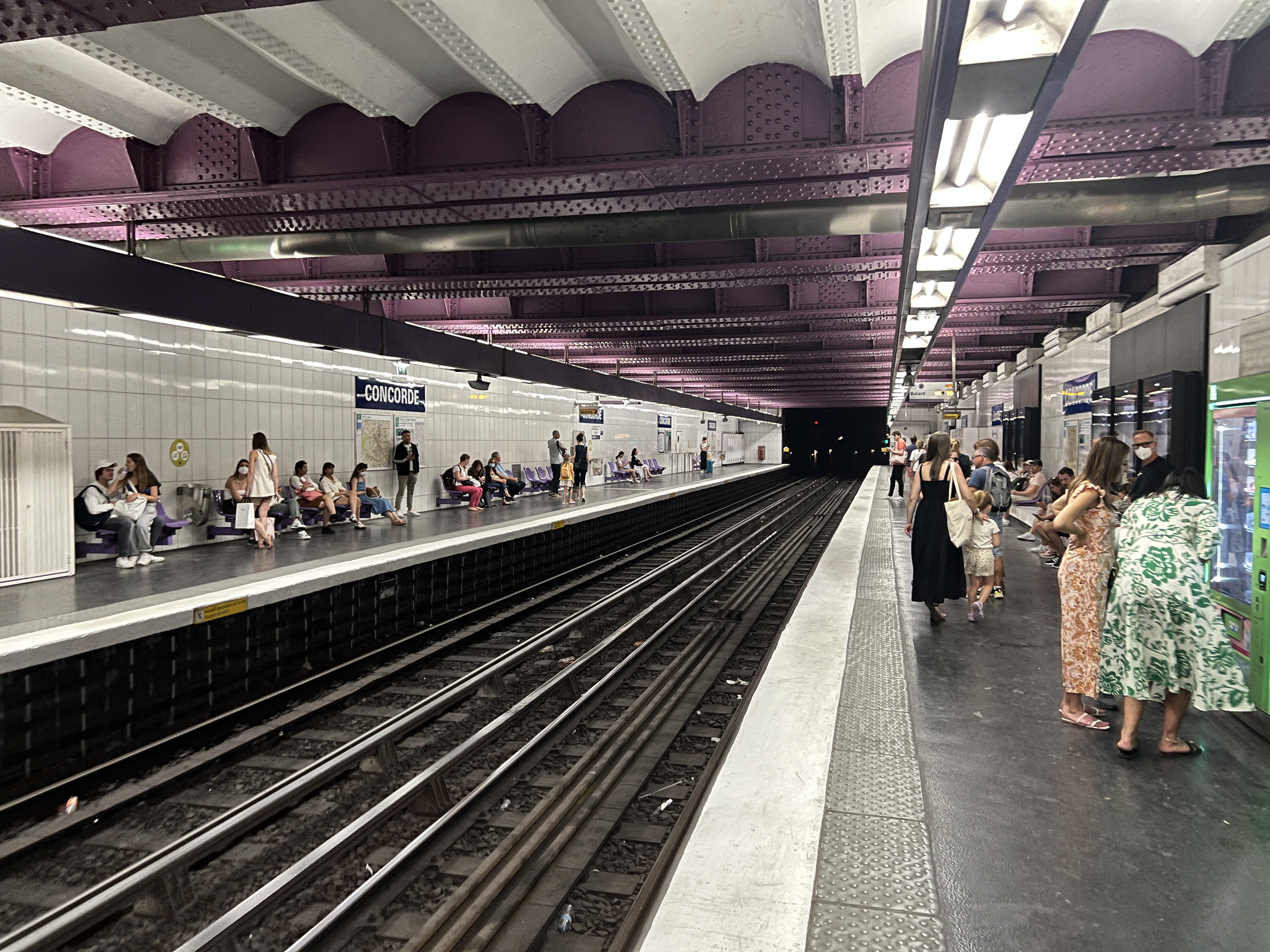
Line 8 platforms

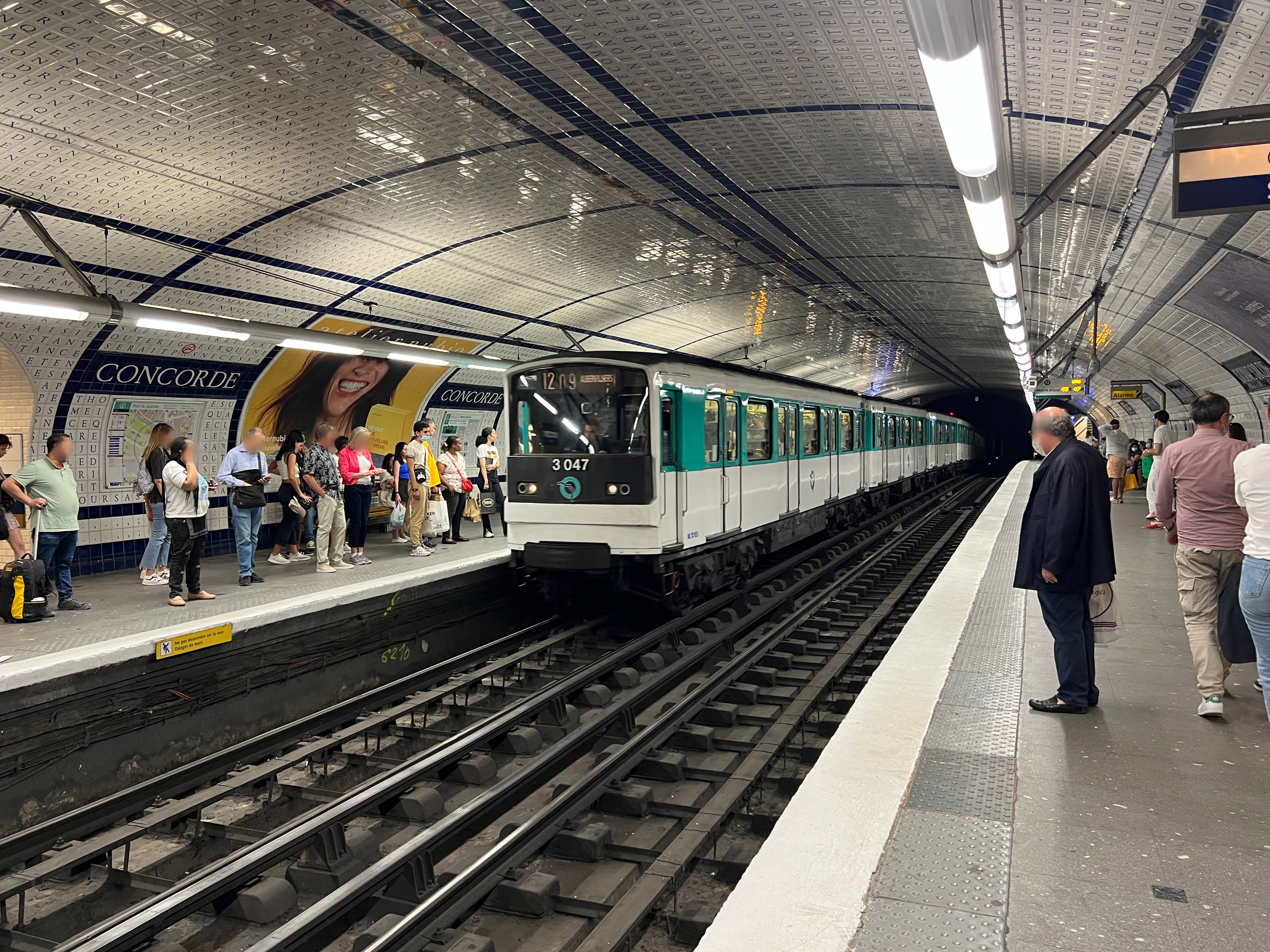
MF 67 on Line 12

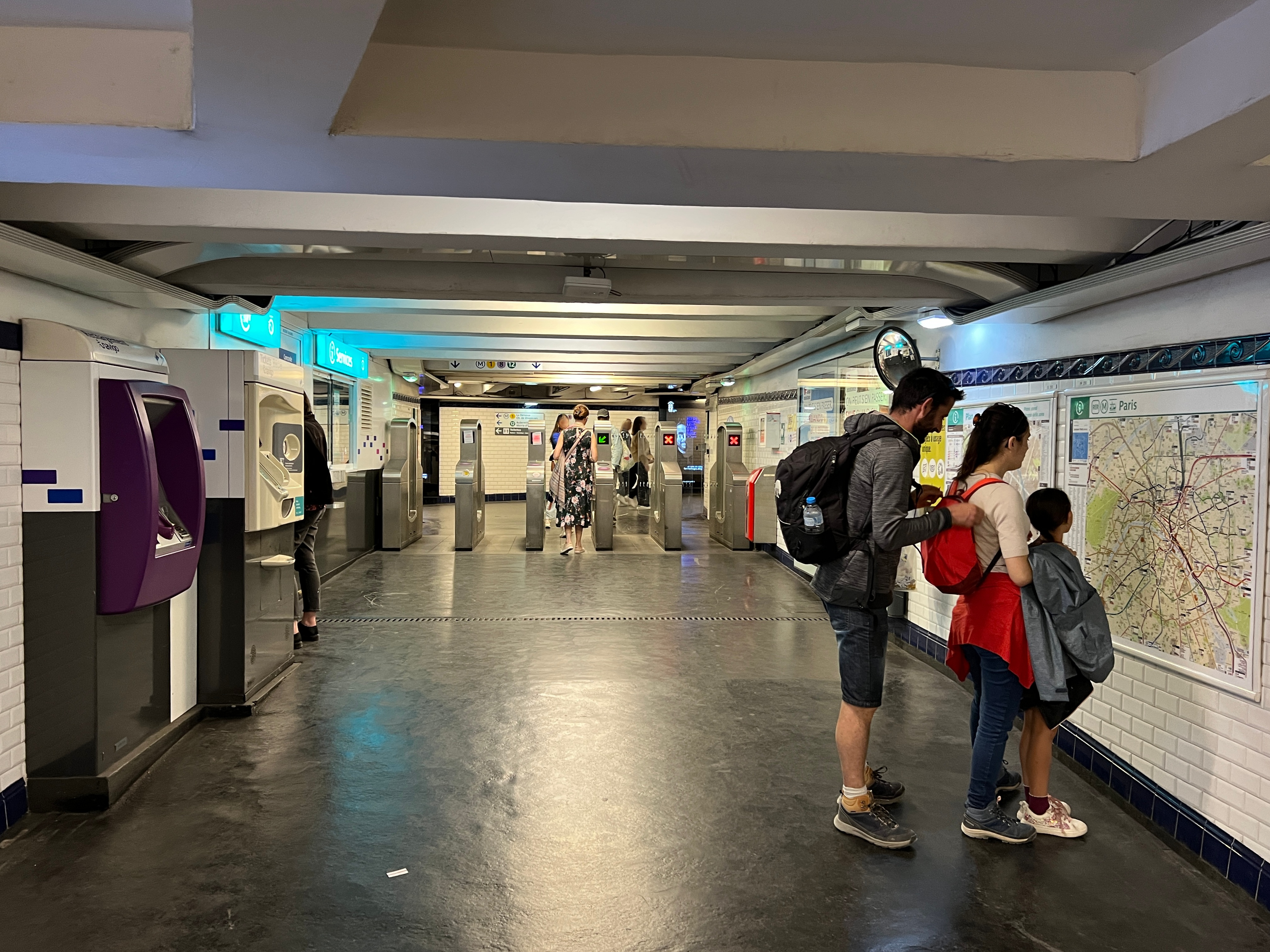
Mezzanine

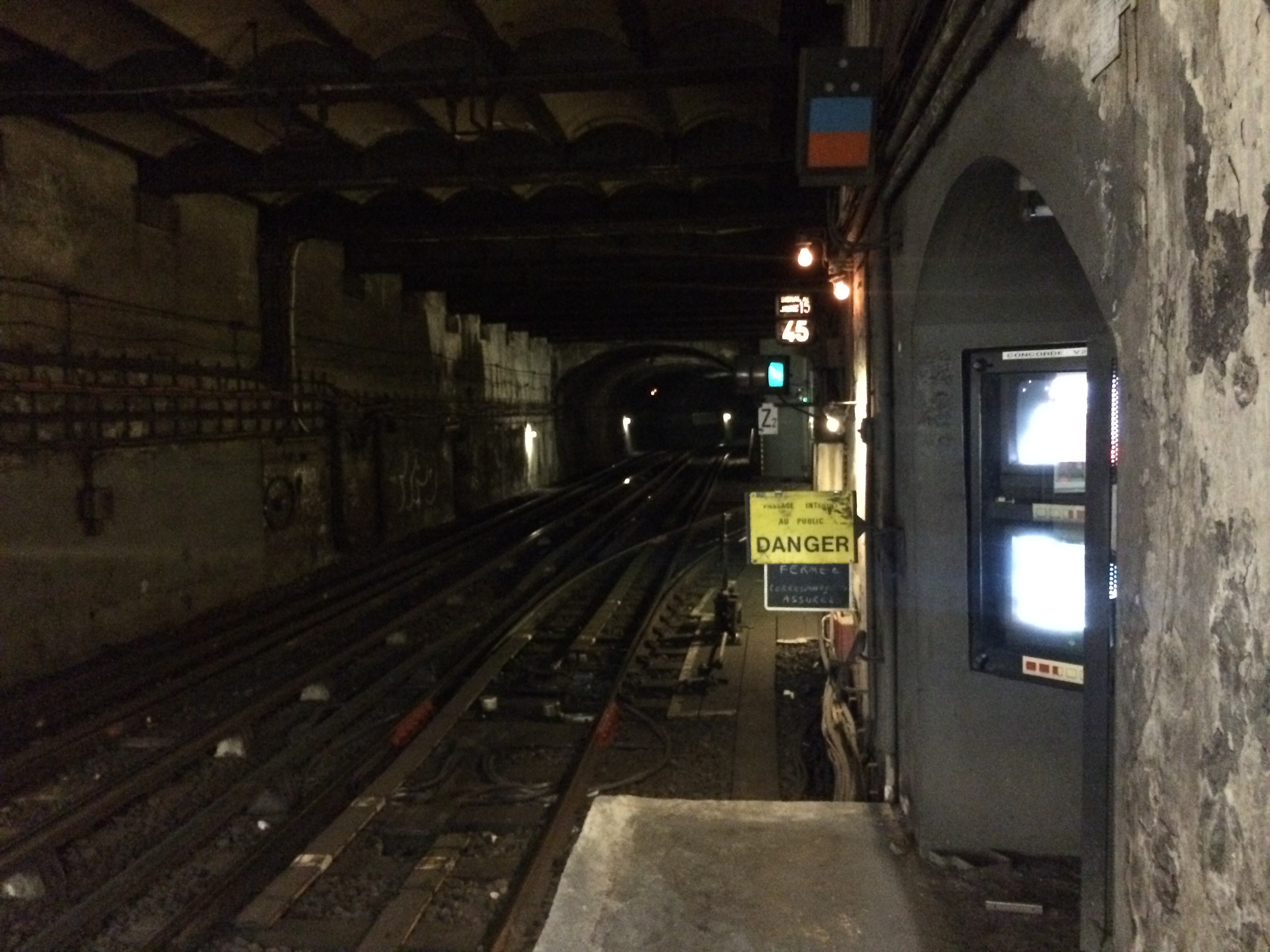
Connection between Lines 8 and 1, south of the platform towards Balard

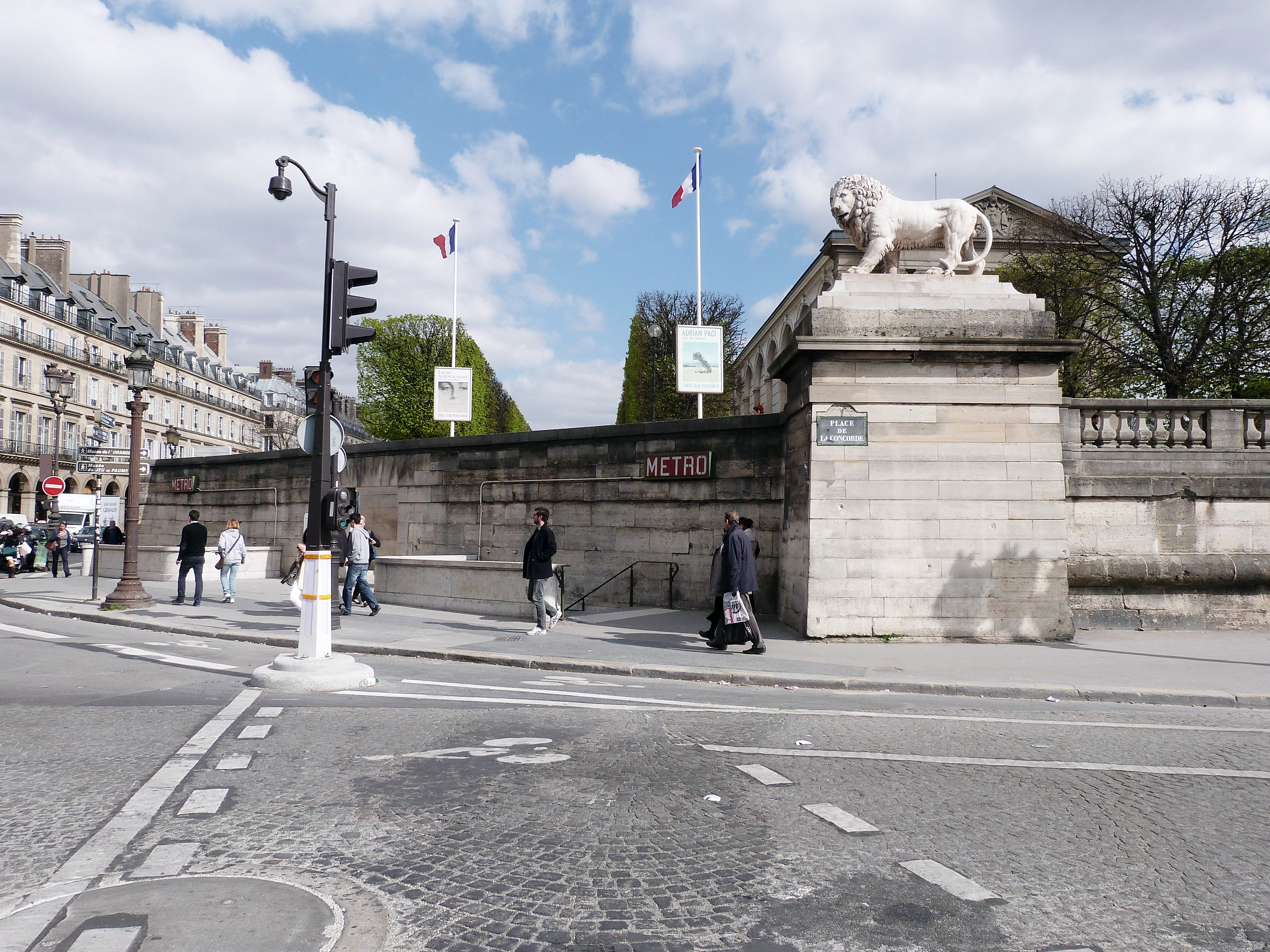
Access 1

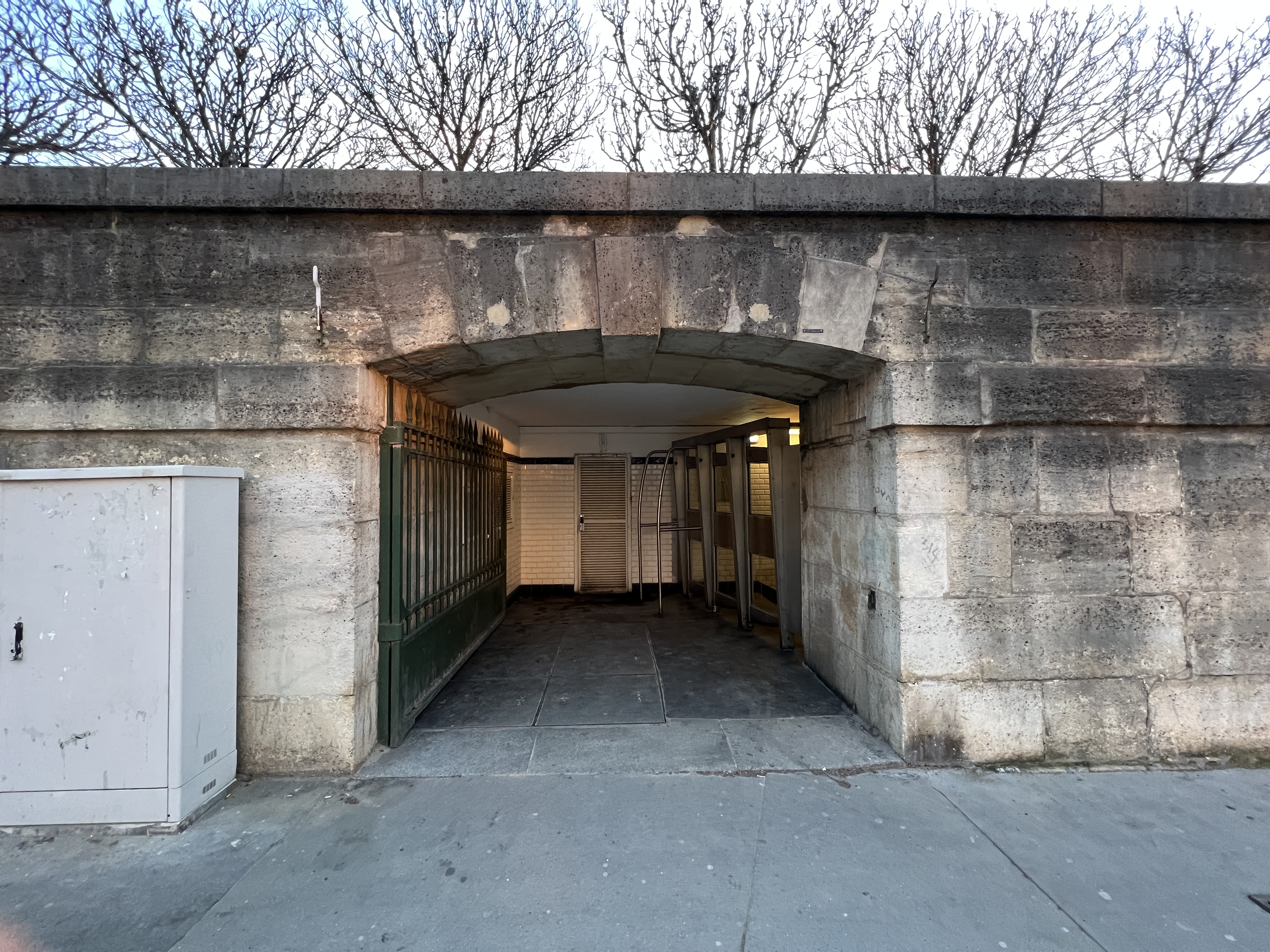
Access 2

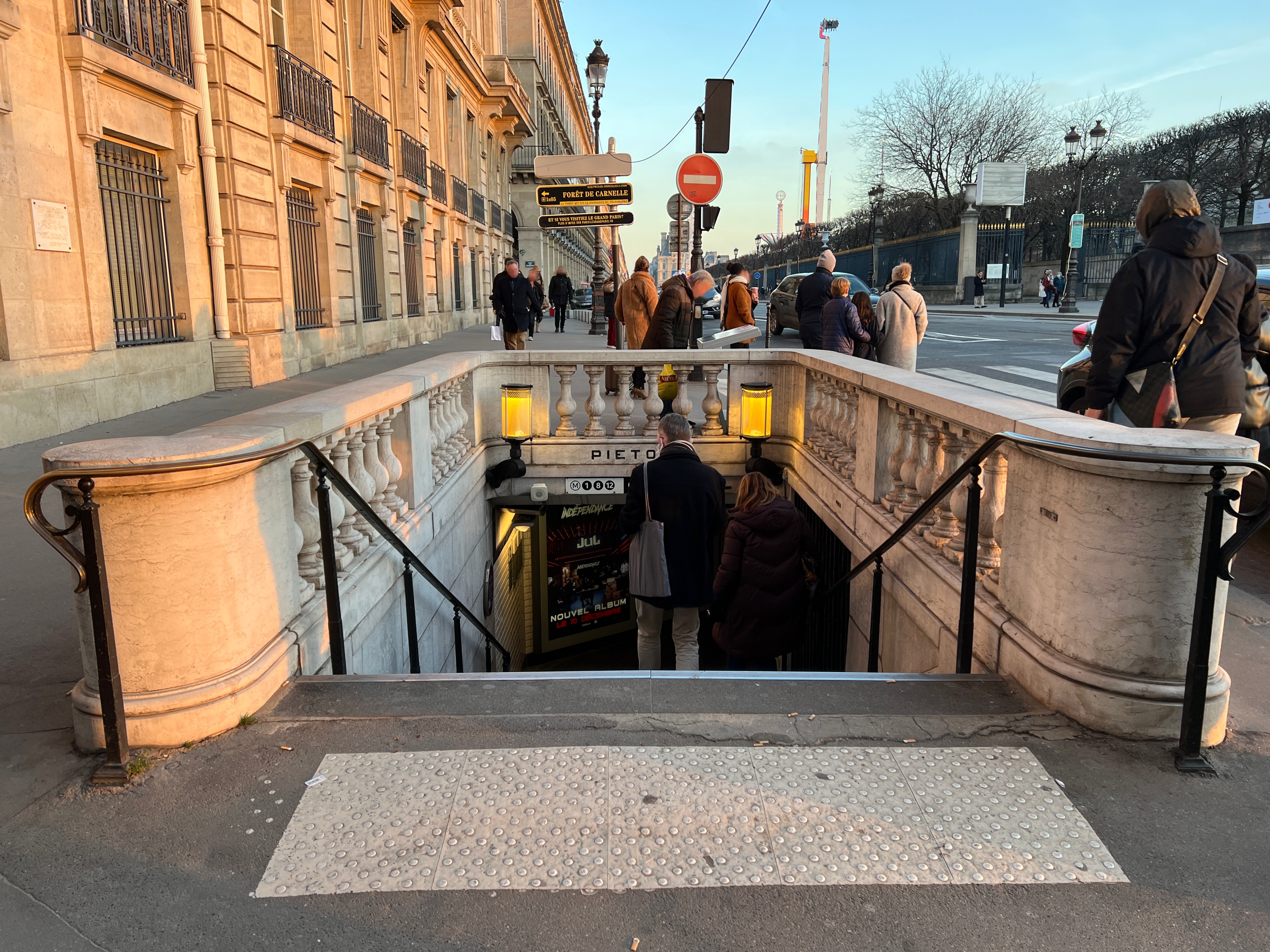
Access 3

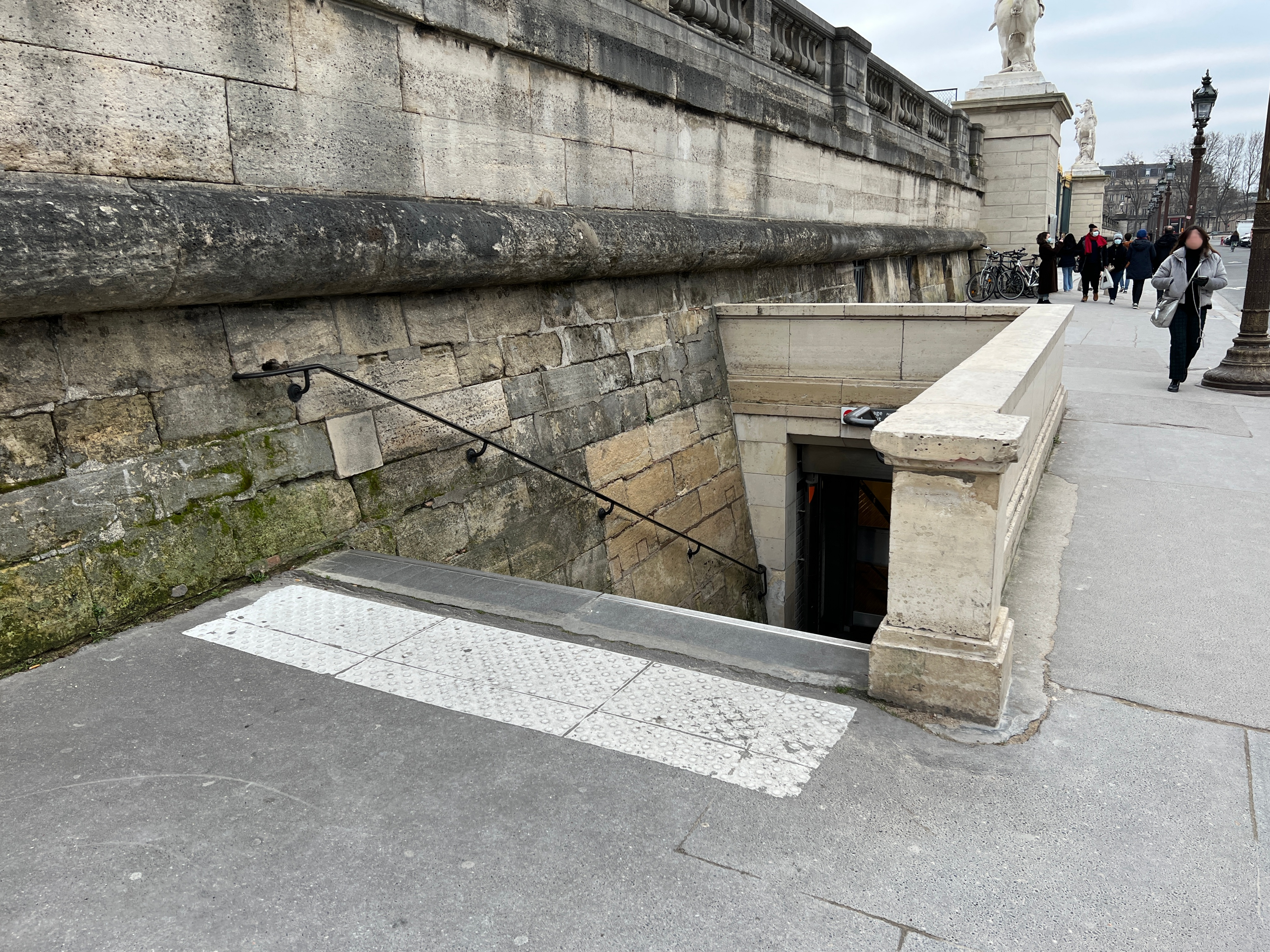
Access 4

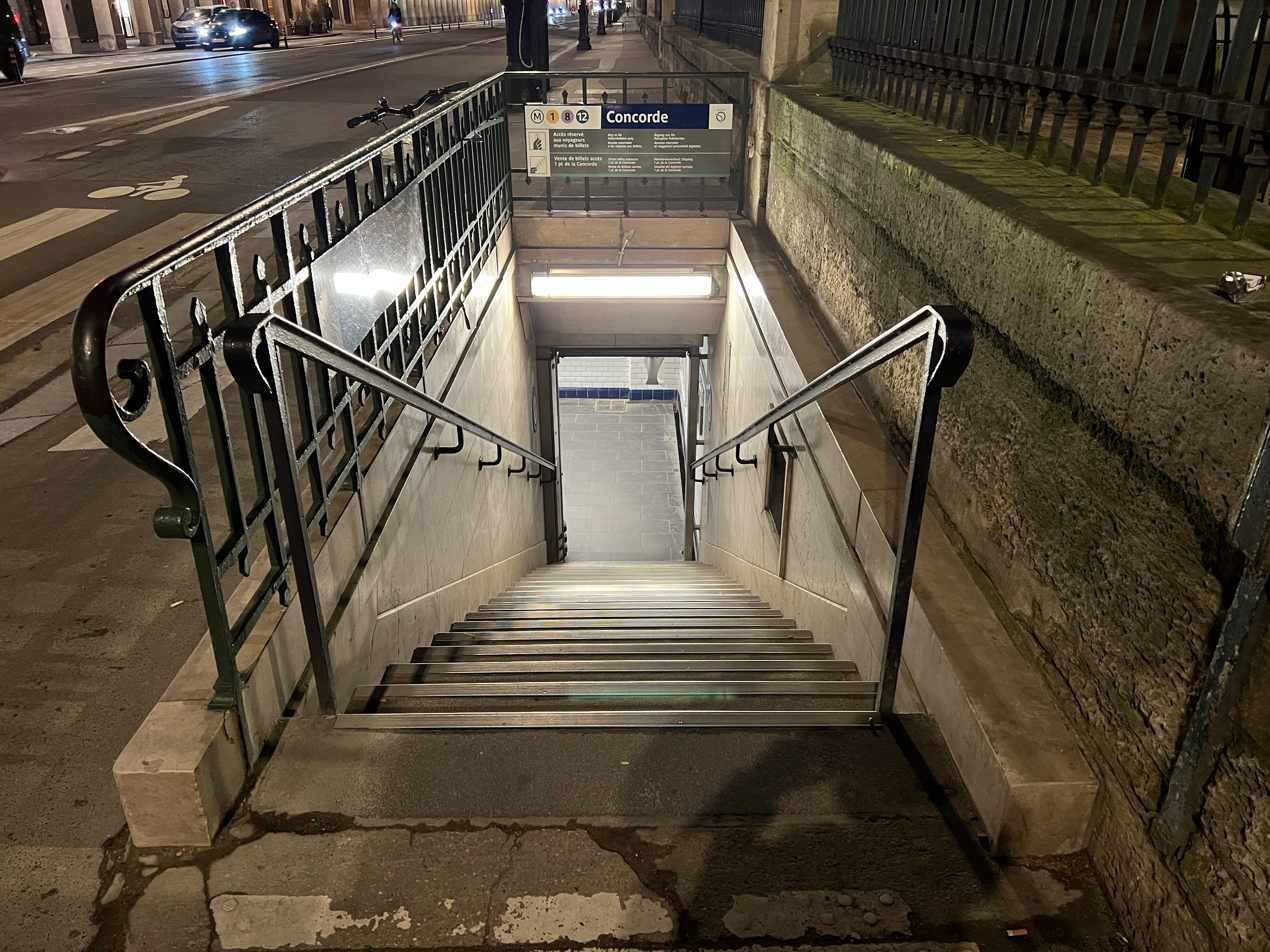
Access 5

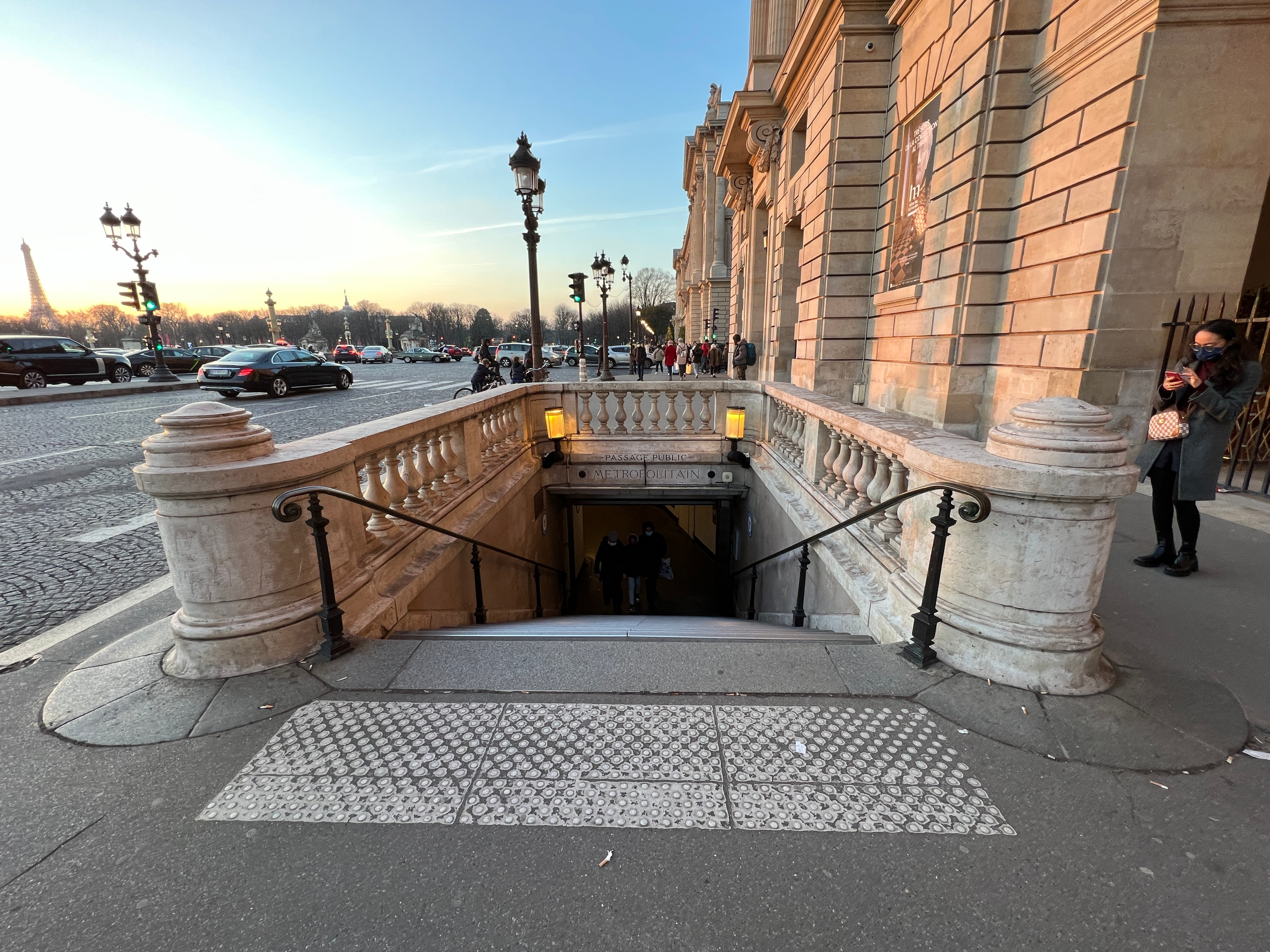
Access 6

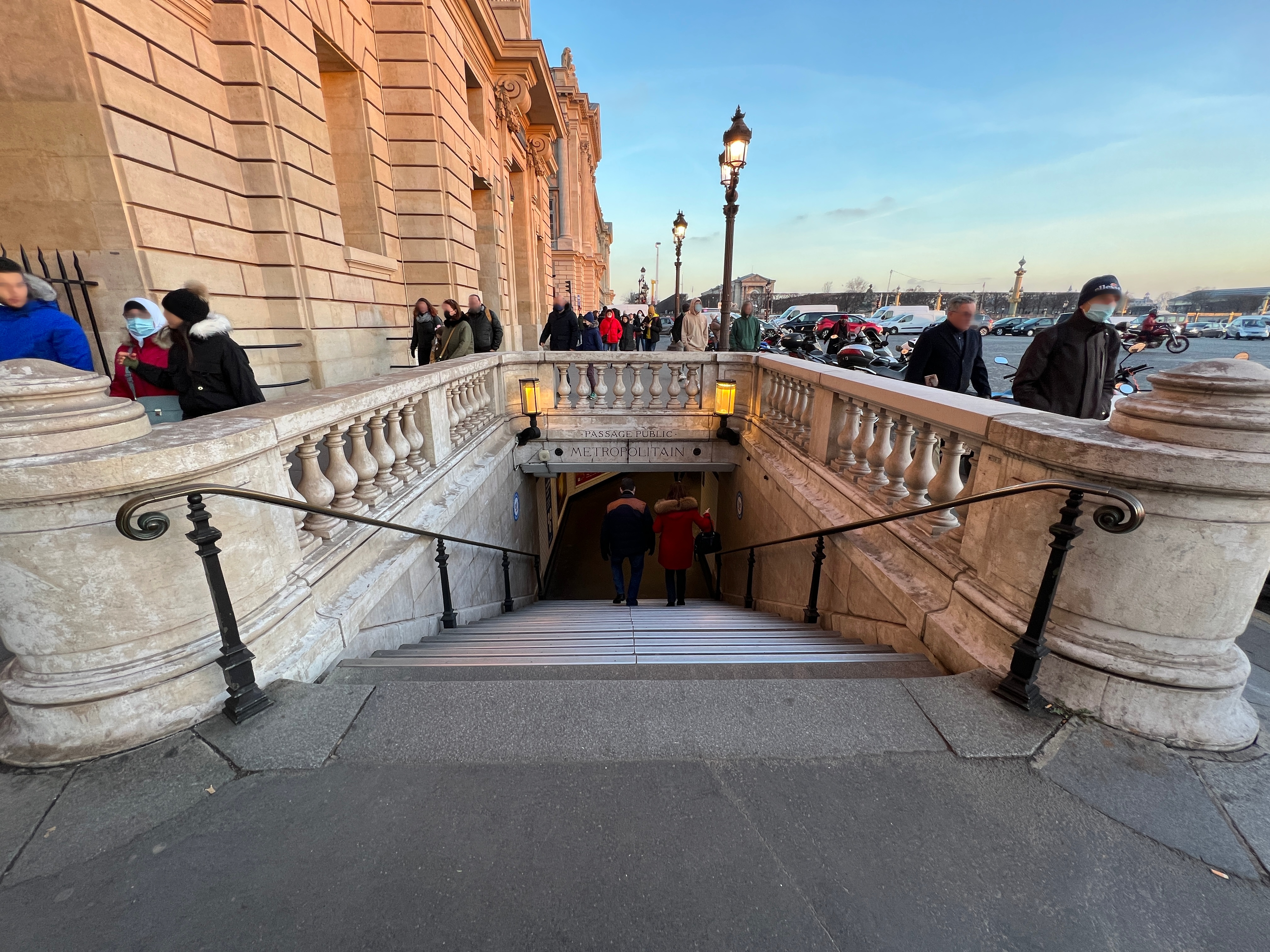
Access 7
