= Tuileries station =

Metro station in Paris, France

Tuileries
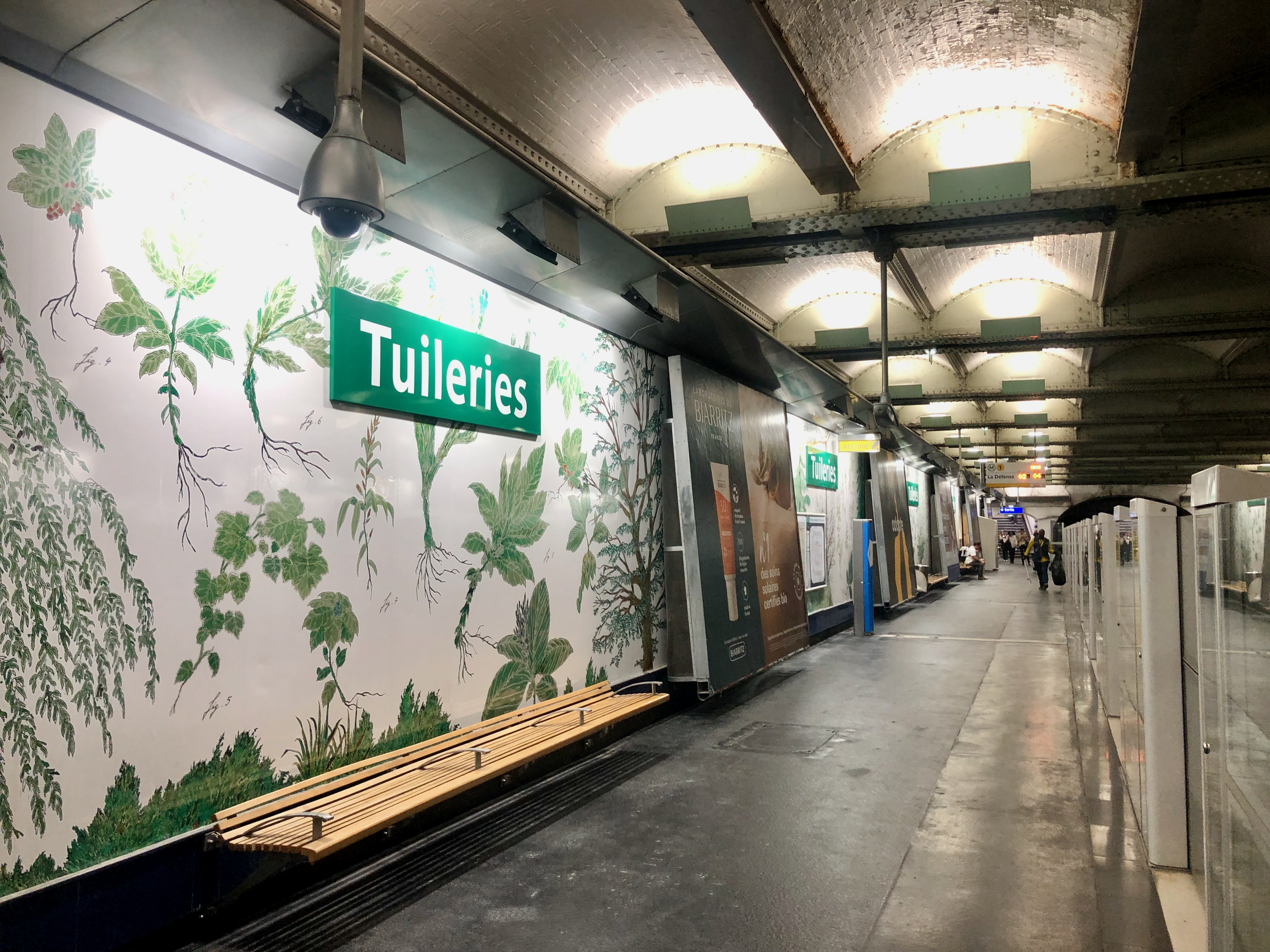
- Station view with 2023 decoration

General information
- Location: 206, Rue de Rivoli; 210, Rue de Rivoli; 1st arrondissement of Paris; Île-de-France; France
- Coordinates: 48°51′52″N 2°19′47″E
- Owner: RATP
- Operator: RATP

Other information
- Fare zone: 1

History
- Opened: 19 July 1900; 126 years ago

Services
Preceding station	Paris Metro	Following station
Concorde towards La Défense	Line 1	Palais Royal–Musée du Louvre towards Château de Vincennes
Route map
Location
- Location within Paris

Tuileries (French pronunciation: [tɥilʁi]) is a station on Line 1 of the Paris Métro. Located in the 1st arrondissement, it serves the Jardin des Tuileries.

The station, along with Concorde and Champs-Élysées-Clemenceau were closed from 17 June to 21 September for the 2024 Summer Olympics.

== Location ==
The station is located underneath the Rue de Rivoli along the Jardin des Tuileries.

== History ==
The station opened on 19 July 1900 with the entry into service of the first section of line 1 between Porte de Vincennes and Porte Maillot.

From the 1960s until the end of the 20th century, the station walls were clad in metal sheets with green horizontal posts and illuminated gold advertising frames, and the metal beams supporting the station ceiling were painted green, and the station was fitted with white Motte style seats. In 2000, to celebrate the métro's centenary, the station was redecorated with wooden benches and wall covered with photo panels showing major events from 11 decades of history. In May 2023, new wall decoration was installed, showing drawings of trees, leaves and flowers, produced by artist Cyprien Chabert, and the platform signs showing the station name were updated with a green background color (instead of the usual blue).

As part of the automation of line 1, the station platforms were upgraded on the weekend of 18 and 19 October 2008, then fitted with platform screen doors in November 2010.

In 2019, 2,614,837 travelers entered this station which placed it in 199th position among metro stations for its usage.

== Passenger services ==
=== Access ===
The station has one entrance and one exit, located on the south sidewalk of the Rue de Rivoli at its intersection with the Rue du Vingt-Neuf-Juillet.

The two access points are situated on either side of an entrance gate to the Jardin des Tuileries. They are decorated with a Guimard entrance listed as a historical monument by a decree of 29 May 1978.

=== Station layout ===
Street Level

B1	Connecting level

Line 1 platforms	Side platform with PSDs, doors will open on the right
Line 1 platforms	Westbound	← toward La Défense – Grande Arche (Concorde)
Line 1 platforms	Eastbound	toward Château de Vincennes (Palais Royal – Musée du Louvre) →
Line 1 platforms	Side platform with PSDs, doors will open on the right

=== Platforms ===
Tuileries is a standard configuration station. It has two platforms separated by the metro tracks. The ceiling consists of a metal deck, the beams of which, silver in color, are supported by vertical walls. Since the introduction of the six-car train line in the 1960s, a 15-meter-long crypt, the ceiling of which rests on closely spaced pillars, extends the platform to its western end.

The decoration of the platforms, created for the centenary of the Metro and line 1, is "cultural" evoking the cultural history of the Metro in relation to that of the twentieth century thanks to thematic panels illustrated with iconic images by decades. The lighting is indirect, projected onto the walls and the vaults of the ceiling above the platforms. The beveled white ceramic tiles only cover the tunnel outlets, the outlets of the corridors and the walls under the crypt. The vault of the crypt is painted white, while its columns are covered with small flat white ceramic tiles laid vertically. The advertising frames are metallic and the name of the station is written in Parisine font on enamelled plates. The platforms are equipped with wooden slatted benches as well as platform screen doors.

=== Bus connections ===
The station is served by lines 78 and 72 of the RATP Bus Network, and, at night, by lines N11 and N24 of the Noctilien network.

== Gallery ==
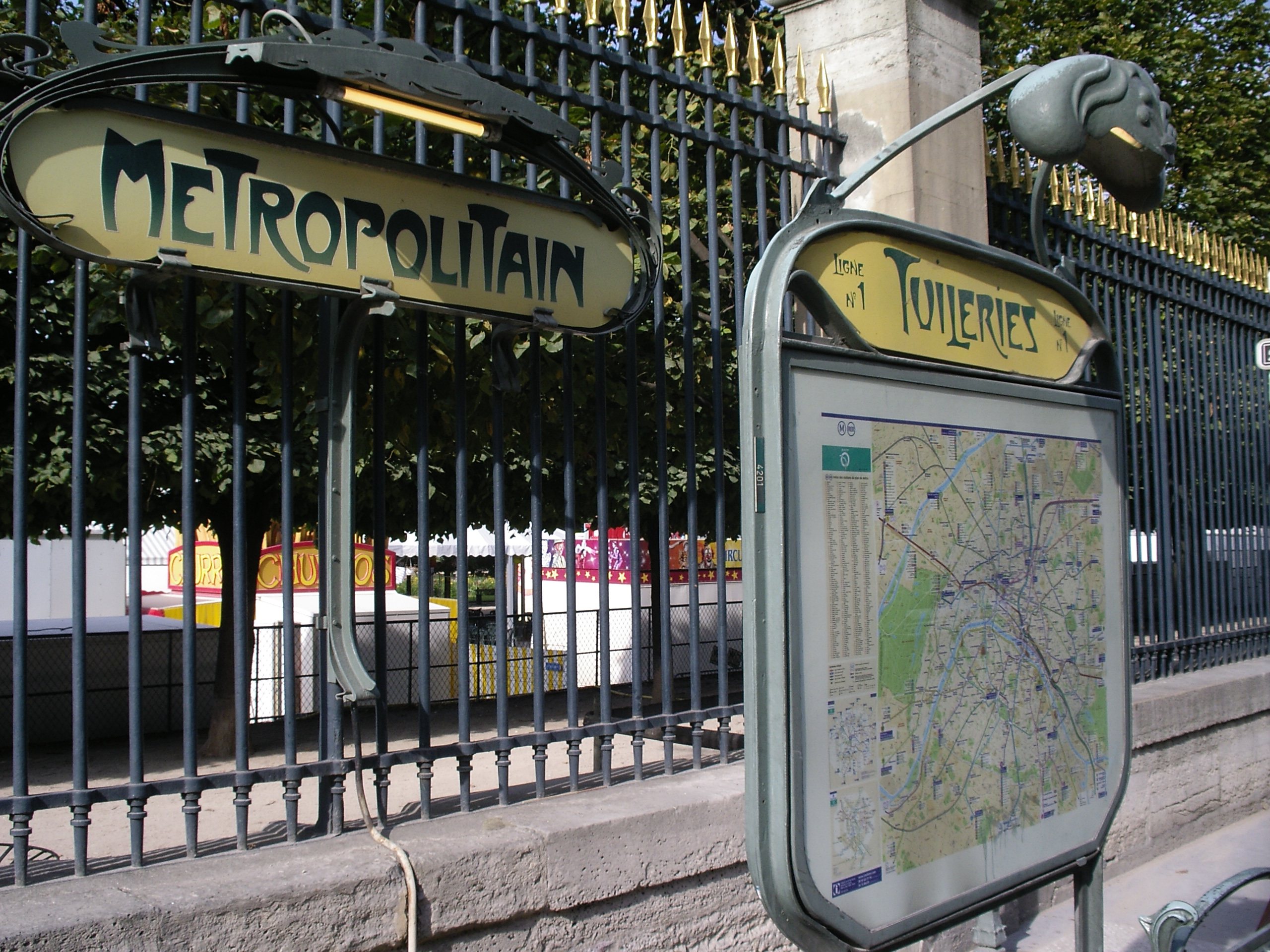
Traditional Paris Métro signage for Tuileries station

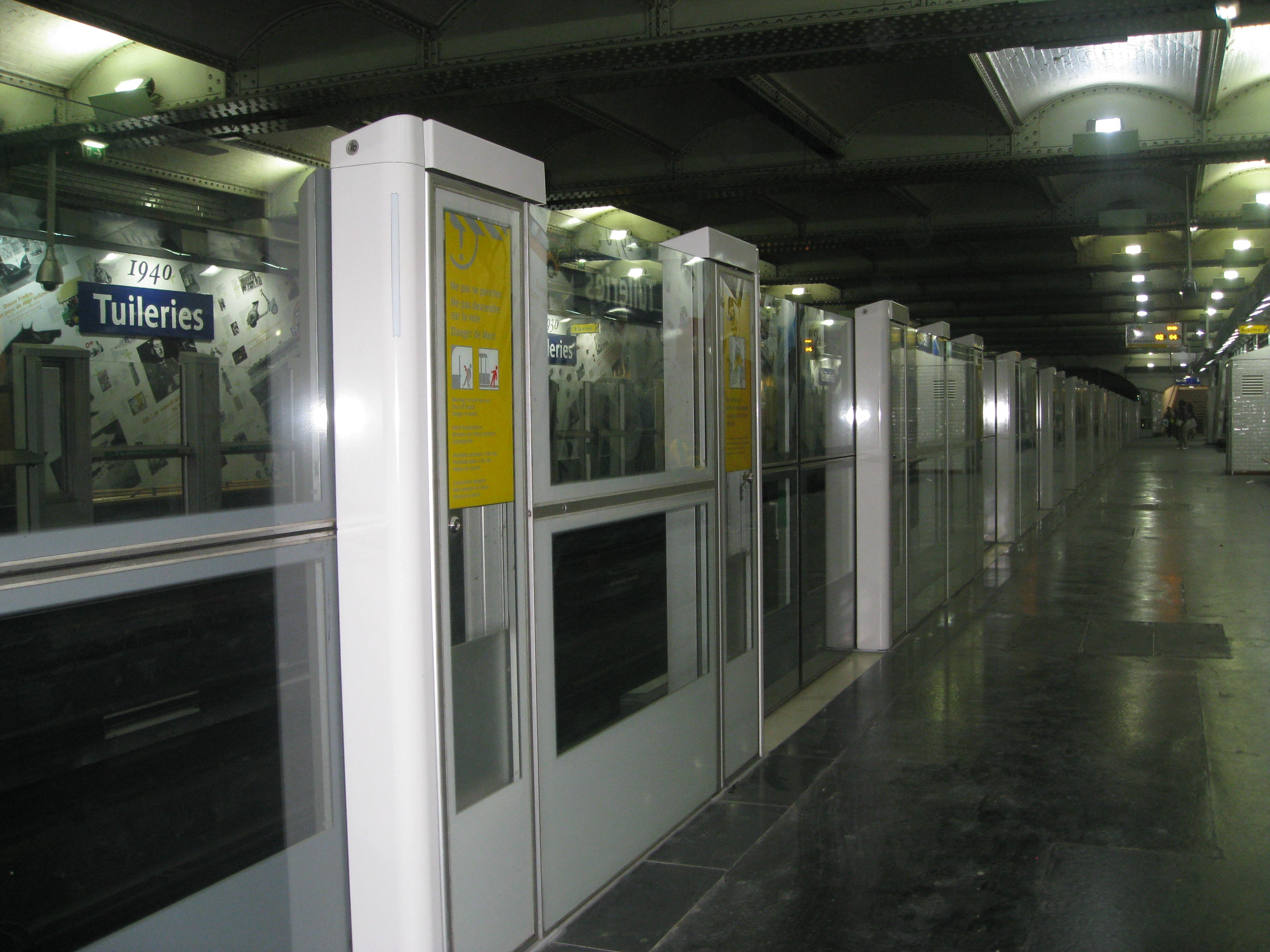
Platform doors installed in 2010

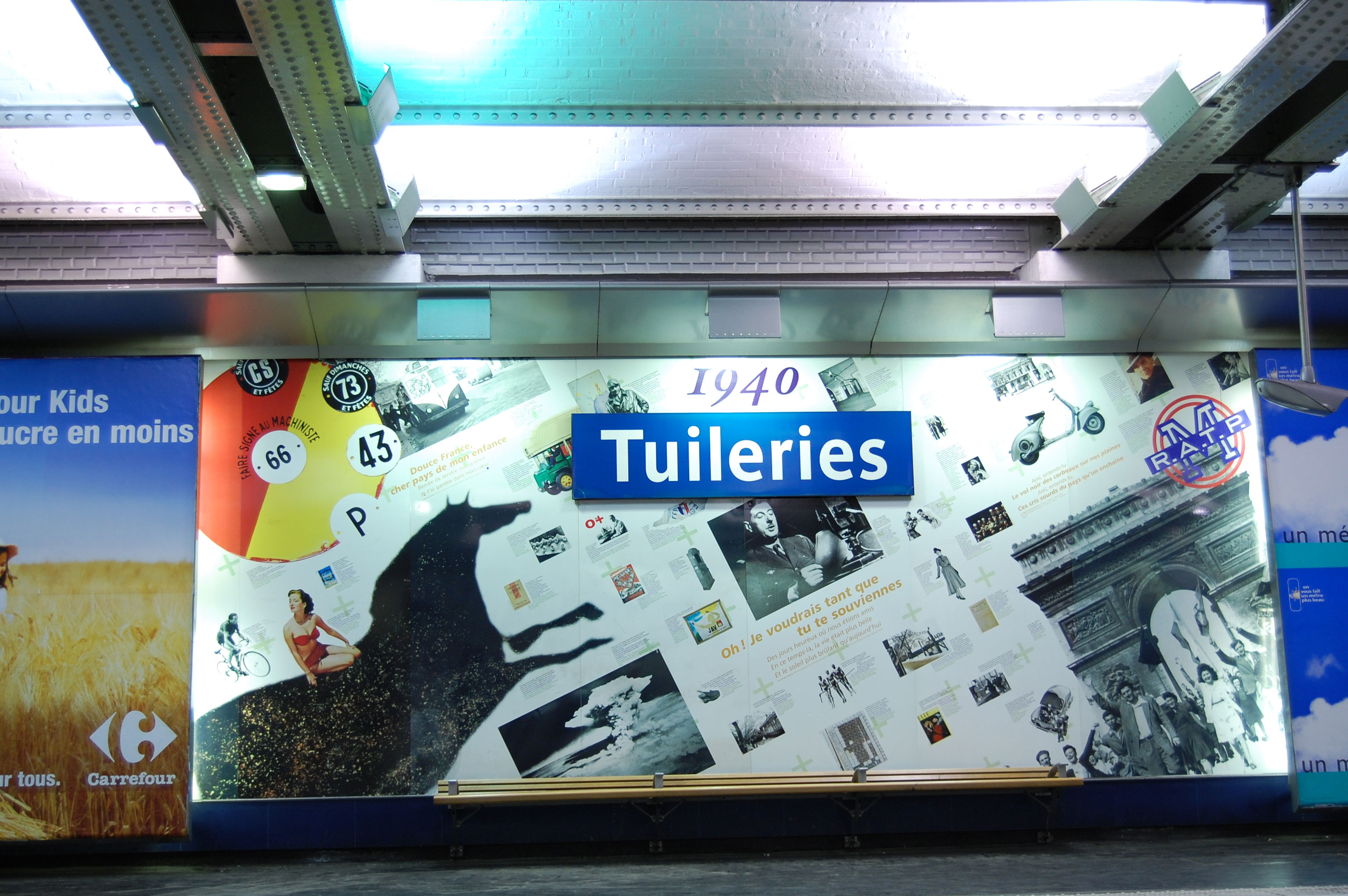
Tuileries platform signage and artwork (2000-2023)

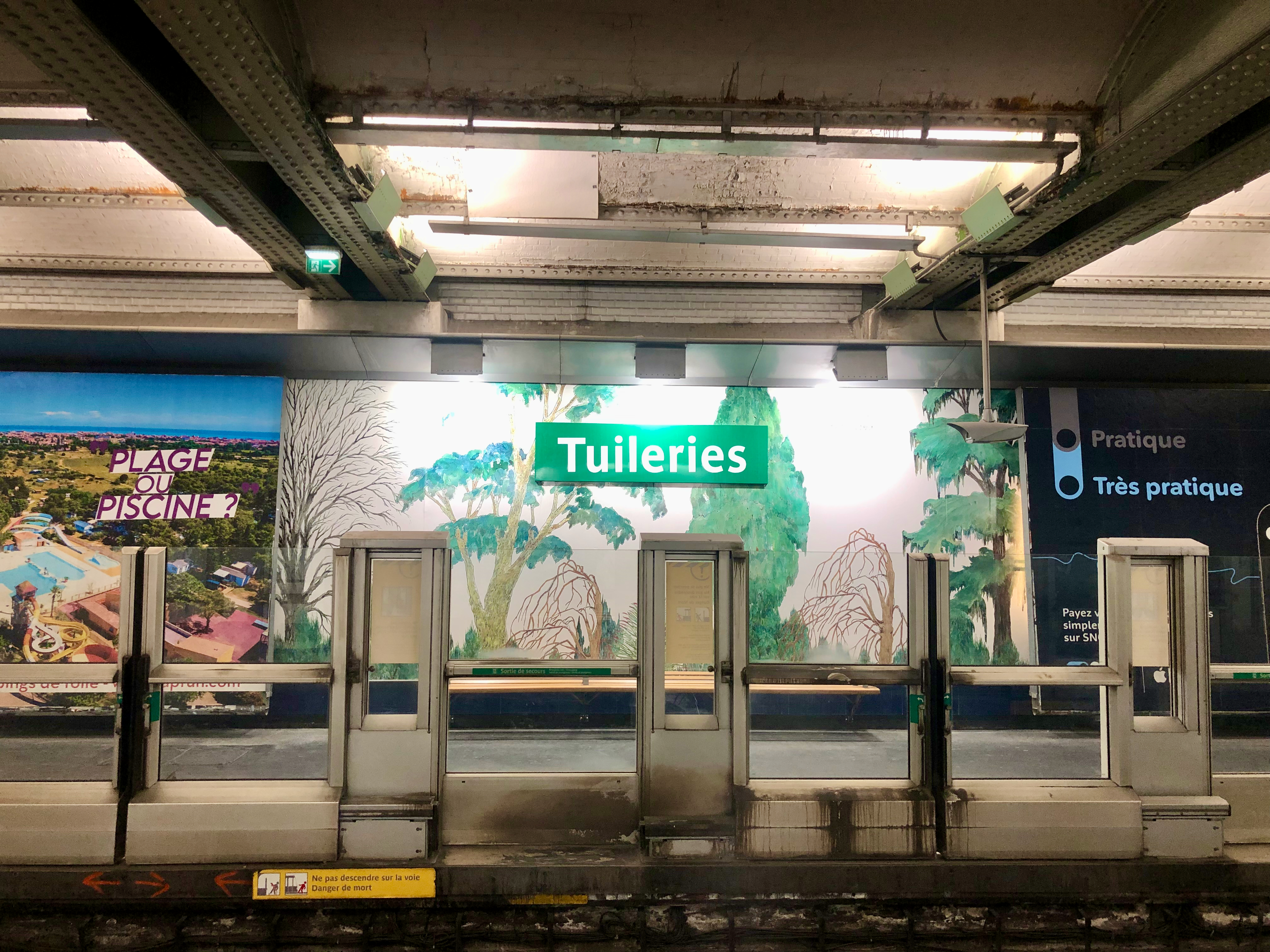
Tuileries platform signage and artwork (2023-)
