= Madeleine station =

Metro station in Paris, France

Madeleine
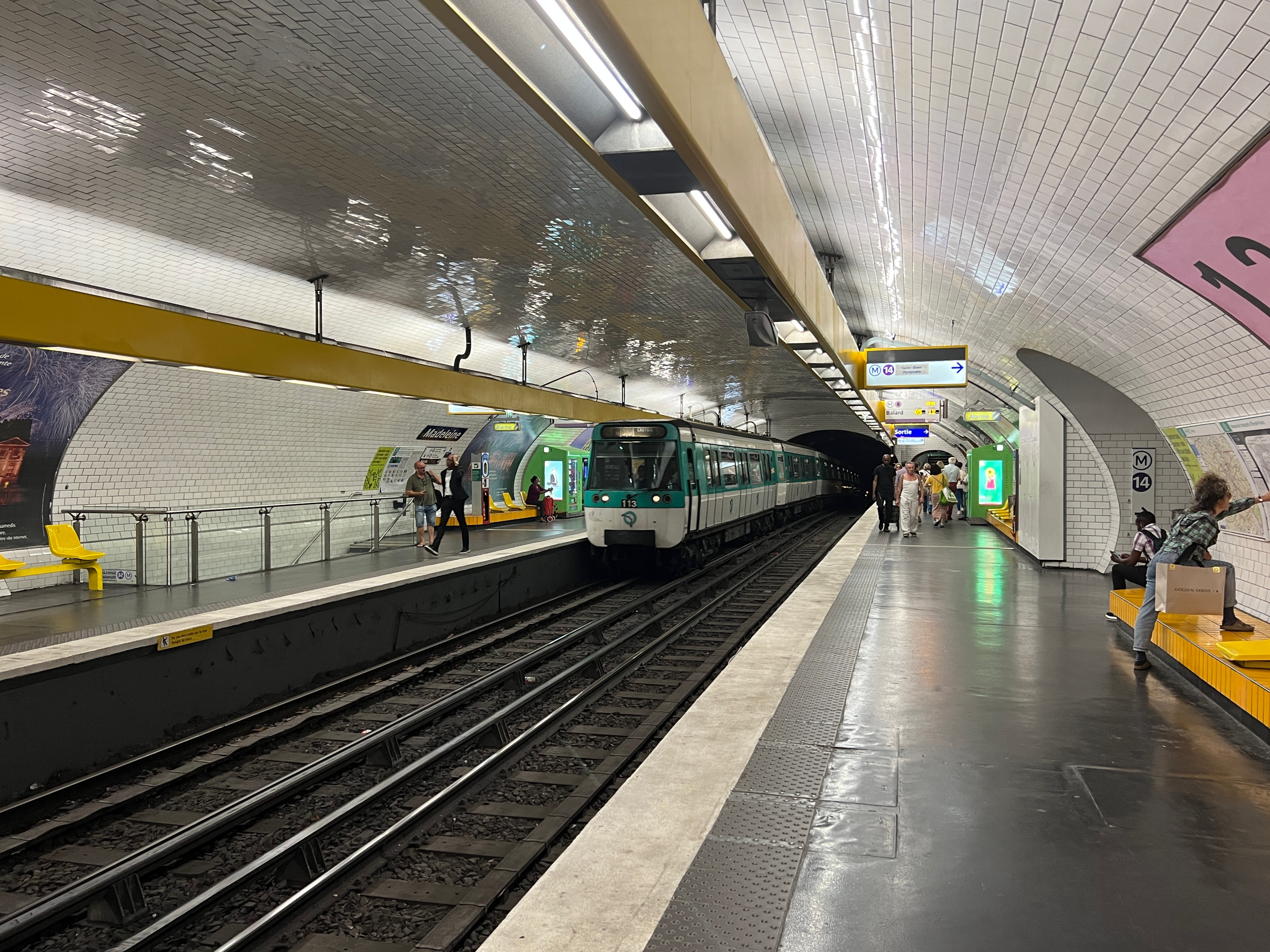
- Line 8 platforms in July 2022

General information
- Location: 8th arrondissement of Paris; Île-de-France; France
- Coordinates: 48°52′11″N 2°19′28″E
- Owner: RATP

Construction
- Accessible: Line 8: At least one escalator or lift in the station between the street and the platform; Line 12: Escalators or lifts throughout, from the street to the platform; Line 14: Yes
- Architect: Jean-Pierre Vaysse & Bernard Kohn (Line 14)

Other information
- Fare zone: 1

History
- Opened: 5 November 1910

Services
Preceding station	Paris Metro	Following station
Concorde towards Balard	Line 8	Opéra towards Pointe du Lac
Concorde towards Mairie d'Issy	Line 12	Saint-Lazare towards Mairie d'Aubervilliers
Saint-Lazare towards Saint-Denis–Pleyel	Line 14	Pyramides towards Aéroport d'Orly
Location
- Location within Paris

Madeleine station (French pronunciation: [madlɛn]) is a station on lines 8, 12 and 14 of the Paris Métro in central Paris and the 8th arrondissement.

== Location ==
The station is located under the Place de la Madeleine, the platforms being positioned:

- on Line 8, east of the square and oriented approximately east-west, along the axis of Boulevard de la Madeleine (between Concorde and Opéra stations));
- on Line 12, also east of the square and oriented approximately north-south, curved along the axis of the side carriageway of the said square on the one hand, and Rue Tronchet on the other hand, (between Saint-Lazare and Concorde);
- on Line 14, northeast of the square and oriented approximately northwest/southeast, along the axis of Rue de Sèze (between Saint-Lazare and Pyramides).

== History ==
The station was opened on 5 November 1910 as part of the original section of the Nord-Sud Company's line A between Porte de Versailles and Notre-Dame-de-Lorette. It is named after the nearby Église de la Madeleine, which was dedicated to Mary Magdalene in the 18th century. A small settlement had grown up in the district by the 6th century around a stronghold of the Bishop of Paris. It was known from an early date as la Ville-l’Évêque ("Town of the Bishop").

The line 8 platforms opened on 13 July 1913 as part of the original section of the line between Beaugrenelle (now Charles Michels on line 10) and Opéra. On 27 March 1931 line A became line 12 of the Métro. The line 14 platforms opened on 15 October 1998 as part of the original section of the line between Madeleine and Bibliothèque François Mitterrand. It was the north-western terminus of Line 14 until its extension to Saint-Lazare on 16 December 2003.

In 2020, with the Covid-19 crisis, 4,297,547 passengers entered this station, which places it in 25th position among metro stations for its attendance.

== Passenger services ==
=== Access ===
The station has five accesses divided into seven metro entrances:

- access 1 - Place de la Madeleine, comprising a fixed staircase and a lift giving access to line 14, leading to the right of no. 22 of the place;
- access 2 - Eglise , consisting of a fixed staircase adorned with two atypical masts (indicating the existence of an underground passage by the double inscription PASSAGE PUBLIC - METRO), located opposite no. 16 of the Square de la Madeleine, at the corner with the same named boulevard;
- access 3 - Rue Duphot, consisting of a fixed staircase with a PASSAGE PUBLIC - METRO mast and an ascending escalator arranged back-to-back, located to the right of no. 23 Boulevard de la Madeleine, and communicating directly with the basement of the Decathlon store located at this address;
- access 4 - Rue de Sèze, consisting of a fixed staircase communicating with the underground car parks under the square, leading out opposite no. 2 rue Tronchet;
- access 5 - Rue Tronchet, consisting of a fixed staircase, located to the right of nos. 3 and 5 of this same street;

=== Station layout ===
G	Street Level	Exit/Entrance
B1	Mezzanine	to Exits/Entrances
Line 8 platforms	Side platform, doors will open on the right
Line 8 platforms	Southbound	← toward Balard (Concorde)
Line 8 platforms	Northbound	toward Pointe du Lac (Opéra) →
Line 8 platforms	Side platform, doors will open on the right
Line 12 platforms	Side platform, doors will open on the right
Line 12 platforms	Southbound	← toward Mairie d'Issy (Concorde)
Line 12 platforms	Northbound	toward Mairie d'Aubervilliers (Saint-Lazare) →
Line 12 platforms	Side platform, doors will open on the right
Line 14 platforms	Side platform with PSDs, doors will open on the right
Line 14 platforms	Northbound	← toward Saint-Denis–Pleyel (Saint-Lazare)
Line 14 platforms	Southbound	toward Aéroport d'Orly (Pyramides) →
Line 14 platforms	Side platform with PSDs, doors will open on the right

=== Platforms ===
The platforms of the three lines are of standard configuration. Two in number per stopping point, they are separated by the metro tracks located in the center and the vault is elliptical.

On line 8, the decoration is in the Andreu-Motte style with two yellow light strips, benches and corridor outlets in flat yellow tiles and yellow Motte seats. However, the thresholds of the corridors allowing the connections with line 14 have a flat white tiling. These arrangements are combined with the same tiles that cover the side walls, the vault and the tunnel exits. The advertising frames are metallic and the name of the station is written in Parisine typeface on enamelled plates.

The platforms of line 12 are built in a curve and have a semi-elliptical vault, a shape specific to the old North-South stations. They are also furnished in the Andreu-Motte style with red strip light canopies, flat red tiled benches and red Motte seats. The outlets of the corridors are also covered in flat red tiling, except for those allowing connections with line 14 which are equipped either with flat white tiling, or with the marble characteristic of the corridors of this line. As with line 8, these fittings are combined with the flat white tiling on the side walls, the vault and the tunnel exits. The advertising frames are metallic and the name of the station is written in Parisine font on enamel plates.

The architecture of the line 14 station is contemporary and follows the principles defined by Bernard Kohn for the whole of this line in 1991, both in the choice of materials (vault in light concrete, marble side walls fitted with glass, tiled floor, wooden seats, etc.) As for lighting and ceiling height; the platforms are also wider than those of other lines. The name of the station appears in Parisine font on backlit panels embedded in the side walls and on stickers affixed to the platform facades.

In addition, the platforms of line 14 are infamous for the nauseating odour which reigns there due to the emanation of Hydrogen sulfide due to the poor sealing of the station.

==== Corridors ====
The connection between line 14 and line 8/12 is done via a large circular access shaft, with many escalators, which is the old TBM access shaft for the construction of the line up to Madeleine. This allows quick trips between platforms.

==== Cultural facilities ====
Three works of art are located in the corridors or on the platforms created for line 14, La Prière and Ryaba la Poule are in the connecting corridor with line 12 while Tissignalisation no 14 adorns the vault of the platforms.

La Prière is a sculpture created by Constantin Brâncuși. This work, a reproduction of the 1907 work, has been on display in the station since December 2001 and features a woman praying. Offered to France by the president of the International Franco-Romanian Foundation, the sculptor Remus Botar Botarro, to celebrate the 125th anniversary of the birth of Constantin Brâncuși (1876-2001), this identical copy was made in the Noack art foundry in Berlin, in 2000, from a silicon rubber moulding.

Ryaba la Poule is a work by Russian artist Ivan Lubennikov. Installed in 2009, it is a 40m^{2} stained glass window made up of 20 panels inlaid with glass elements placed on the mezzanine access to the platforms, at the outlet of the connecting corridor with line 12. In exchange for this work, RATP provided the Moscow Metro with a Guimard kiosk, which was installed at the entrance to Kiyevskaya station on the Koltsevaya line in Moscow.

Tissignalisation no 14 is a work by the French artist Jacques Tissinier. Created at the same time as the station, it is installed on the vault of the line 14 . This is an installation using a thousand embedded discs in coloured enamelled steel. Each disc measures 16 cm in diameter and represents a stylized papyrus sheet coloured in red, white, blue and orange.

=== Bus connections ===
The station is served by lines 42, 45, 52, 84, 94 of the RATP Bus Network.

== Nearby ==
- Église de la Madeleine, Place de la Madeleine
- Olympia
- Ministry of Justice
- Colonne Vendôme
- Théâtre de la Madeleine
- Théâtre Édouard VII
- Cour des comptes
- Pinacothèque de Paris

== Gallery ==
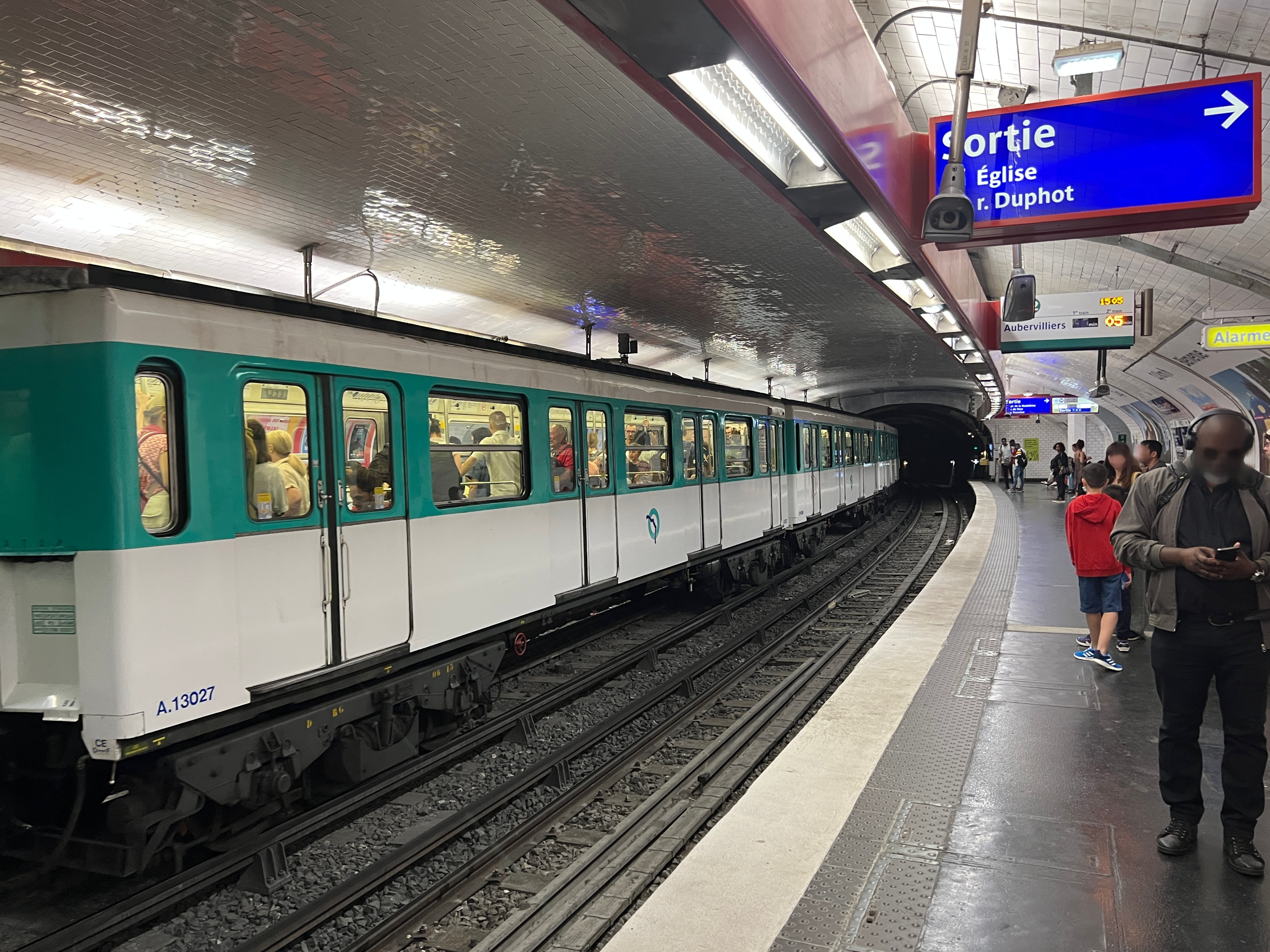
Line 12 platforms

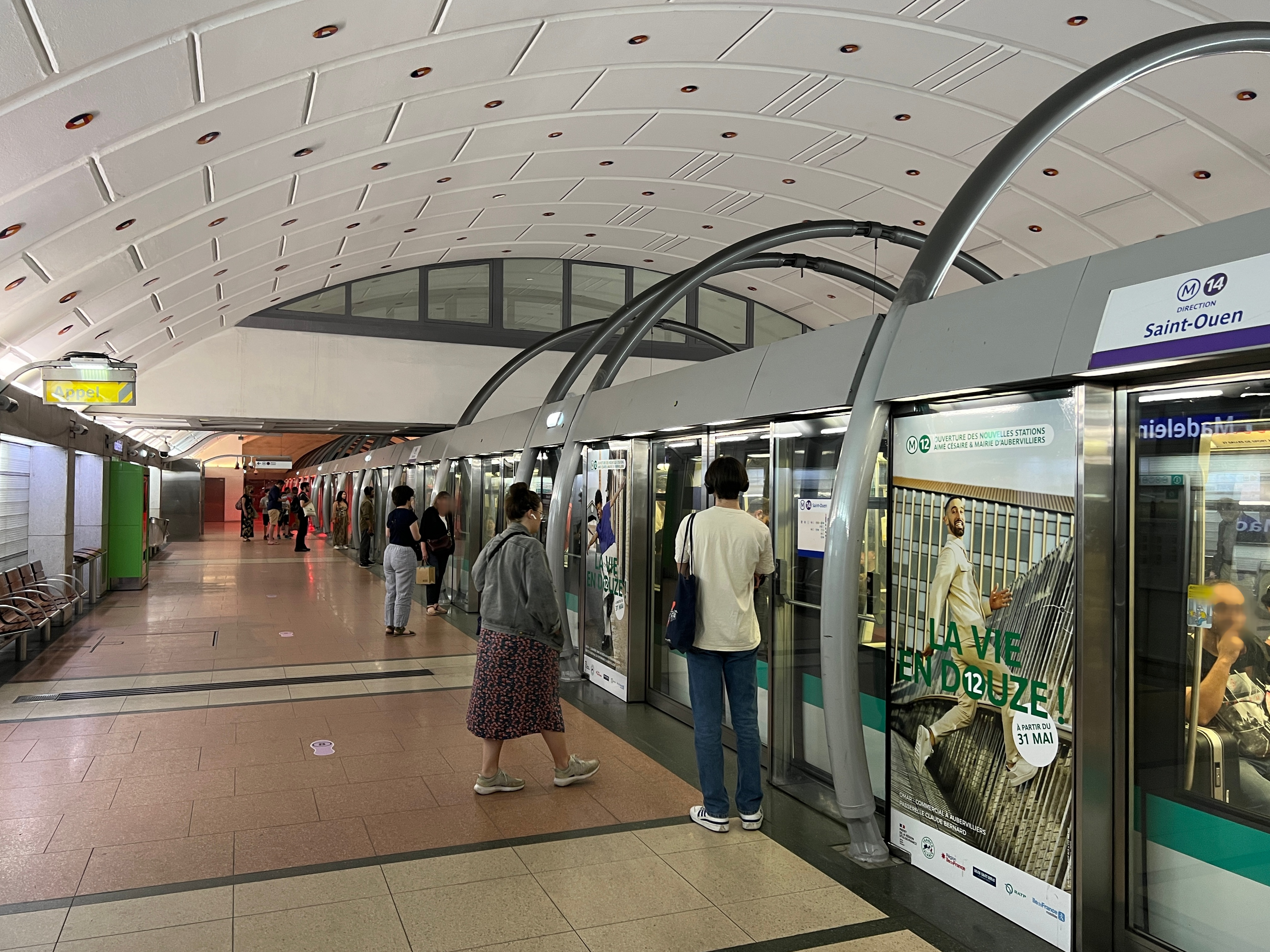
Line 14 platforms

== Tenants ==
At one time Northwest Airlines had its Paris offices in the station.
