= Rome station (Paris Metro) =

Metro station in Paris, France

Rome
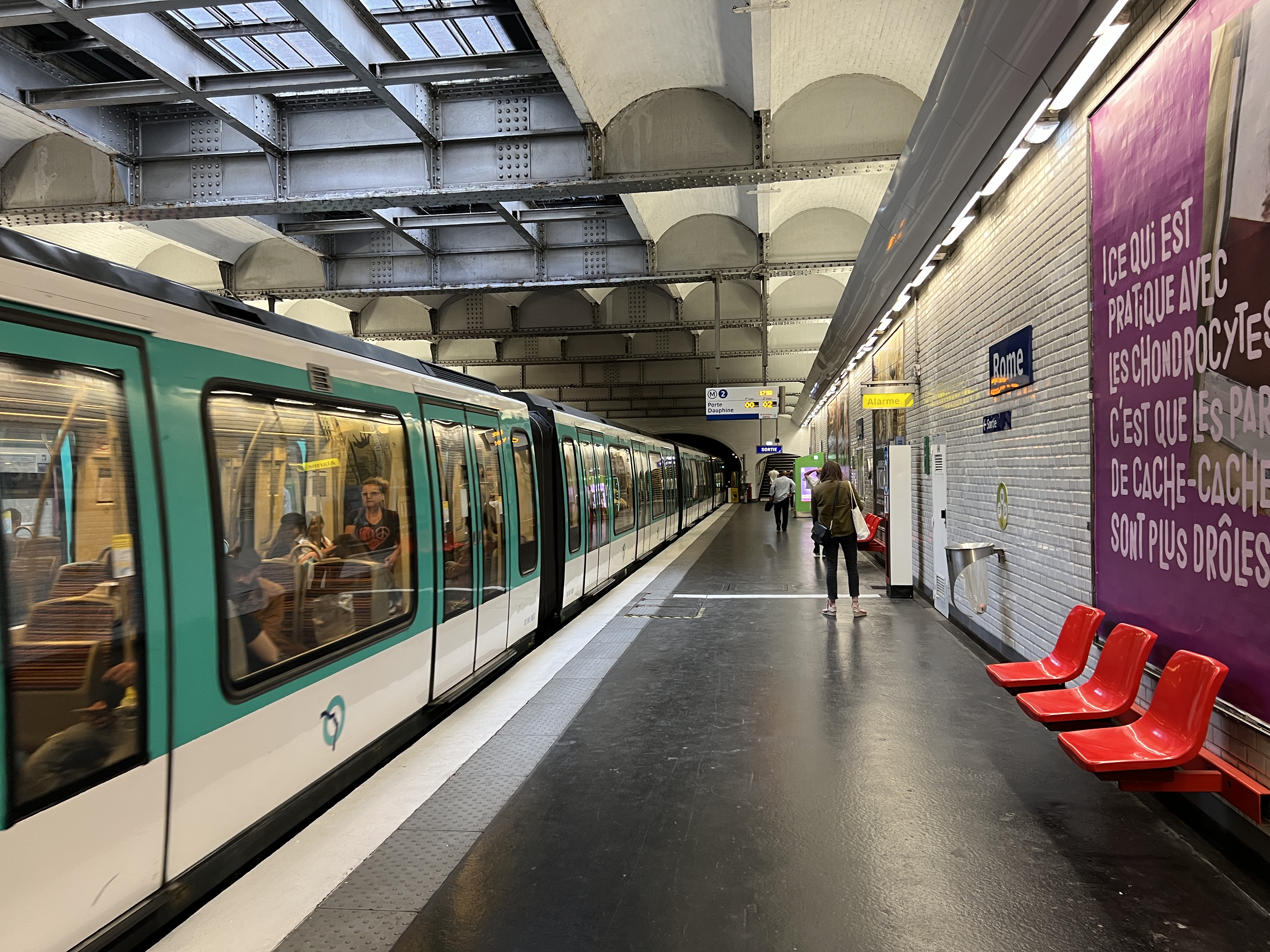
- MF 01 rolling stock at Rome in 2022

General information
- Location: 60, Boul. des Batignolles; 8th arrondissement of Paris; Île-de-France; France
- Coordinates: 48°52′57″N 2°19′19″E
- Owner: RATP
- Operator: RATP

Other information
- Fare zone: 1

History
- Opened: 7 October 1902

Services
Preceding station	Paris Metro	Following station
Villiers towards Porte Dauphine	Line 2	Place de Clichy towards Nation
Location
- Location within Paris

Rome (French pronunciation: [ʁɔm]) is a station on Line 2 of the Paris Metro. It is located on the border of the 8th and 17th arrondissement.

== Location ==
The station is located under the central reservation of Boulevard des Batignolles, east bridge crossing the tracks to Gare Saint-Lazare. Oriented approximately along an east–west axis, it is located between Villiers and Place de Clichy stations.

== History ==
The station was opened on 7 October 1902 as part of the extension of line 2 from Étoile to Anvers. The name is that of one of several streets in the area named for European capitals, in this case Rue de Rome, capital of Italy. Some of these streets having also given their patronym to the stations such as Europe on line 3 and Liège on the line 13. Rome metro station is also, with Iéna on line 9, Cité on line 4 as well as the never-opened station Haxo between lines 3a and 7a, one of four in the network whose name has only four letters.

As part of the RATP's Renouveau du métro program, the station was renovated on 5 November 2001.

On 9 October 2019, half of the nameplates on the station's platforms were temporarily replaced by the RATP in order to celebrate the 60th anniversary of Astérix and Obélix, as in eleven other stations. Taking up in particular the typography characteristic of the comics of René Goscinny and Albert Uderzo, Rome was humorously renamed Ils sont fous ces Romains! (They are crazy these Romans!) from the recurring phrase from Obélix. In addition, all of the advertising posters were also replaced by sketches from the famous comic strip.

In 2019, 2,753,714 travelers entered this station which placed it at 193rd position of the metro stations for its usage out of 303.

== Passenger services ==
=== Access ===
The station has a single access entitled Boulevard des Batignolles, leading to the central reservation of this boulevard facing no. 60. Consisting of a fixed staircase, it is adorned with a Guimard entrance, which was registered as historic monuments by the decree of 12 February 2016.

=== Station layout ===
Street Level

B1	Mezzanine for platform connection

Platform level	Side platform, doors will open on the right
Platform level	Westbound	← toward Porte Dauphine (Villiers)
Platform level	Eastbound	toward Nation (Place de Clichy) →
Platform level	Side platform, doors will open on the right

=== Platforms ===
Rome is a standard configuration station. It has two platforms separated by metro tracks. The platform is established flush with the walls, directly under the road, with the passage of line 2 above the railway tracks of Gare Saint-Lazare (west of the stopping point) did not allow digging at depth. The ceiling thus consists of a metal deck, whose beams, silver in colour, are supported by vertical walls. This ceiling is pierced in the centre with a well allowing direct daylight to enter the station. The bevelled white ceramic tiles cover the wall, and the tunnel exits. The advertising frames are metallic, and the name of the station is written in the Parisine font on enamelled plates. The seats are a red Motte style. The lighting is semi-direct, projected on the sides and the first row of vaults.

=== Bus services ===
The station is served by lines 28, 30, 66 and 94 of the RATP Bus Network.

== Nearby ==
Nearby are the town hall of the 17th arrondissement and the Institut Universitaire de Formation des Maîtres (teachers' college).

== Gallery ==
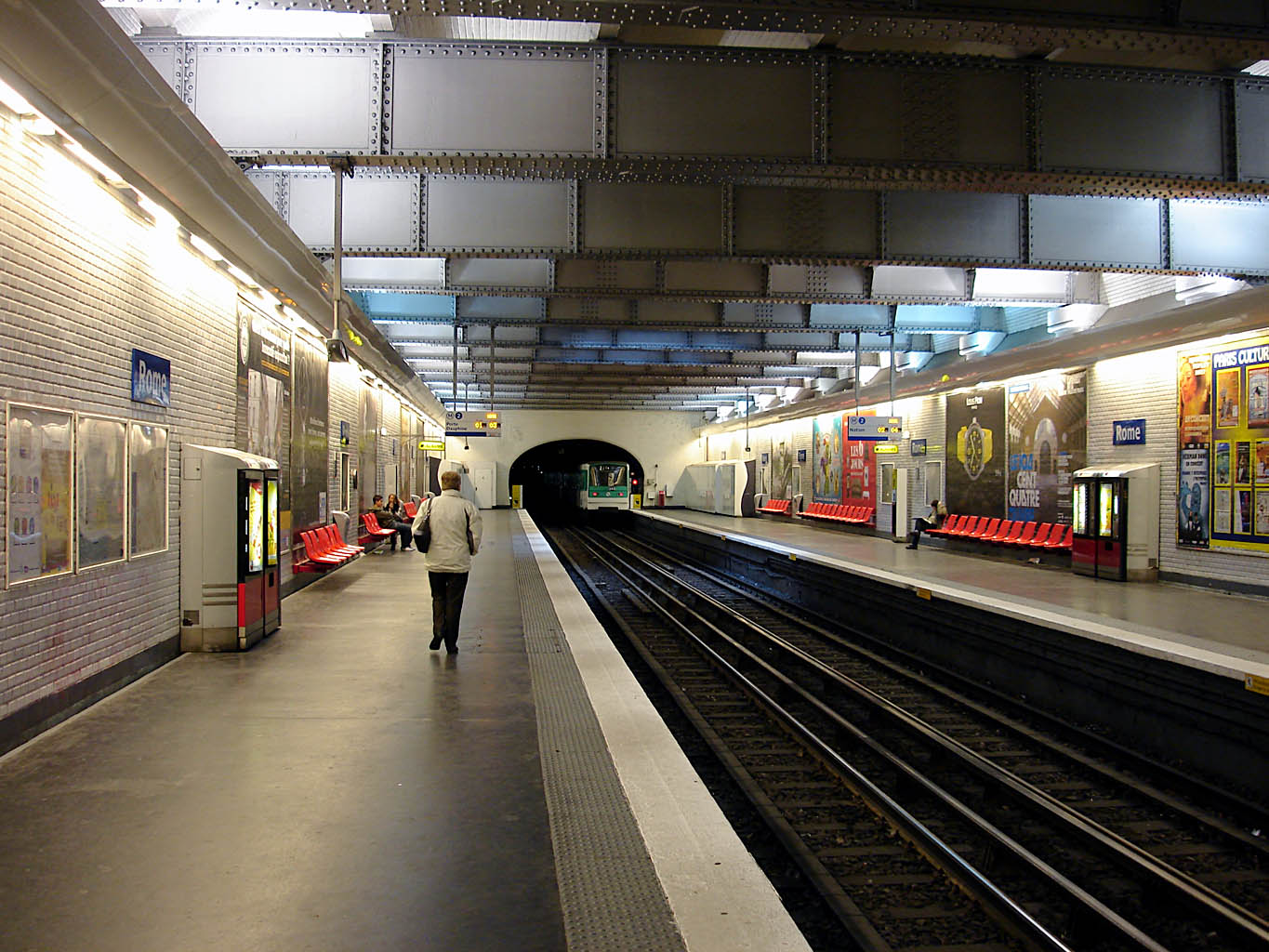
Line 2 platforms at Rome

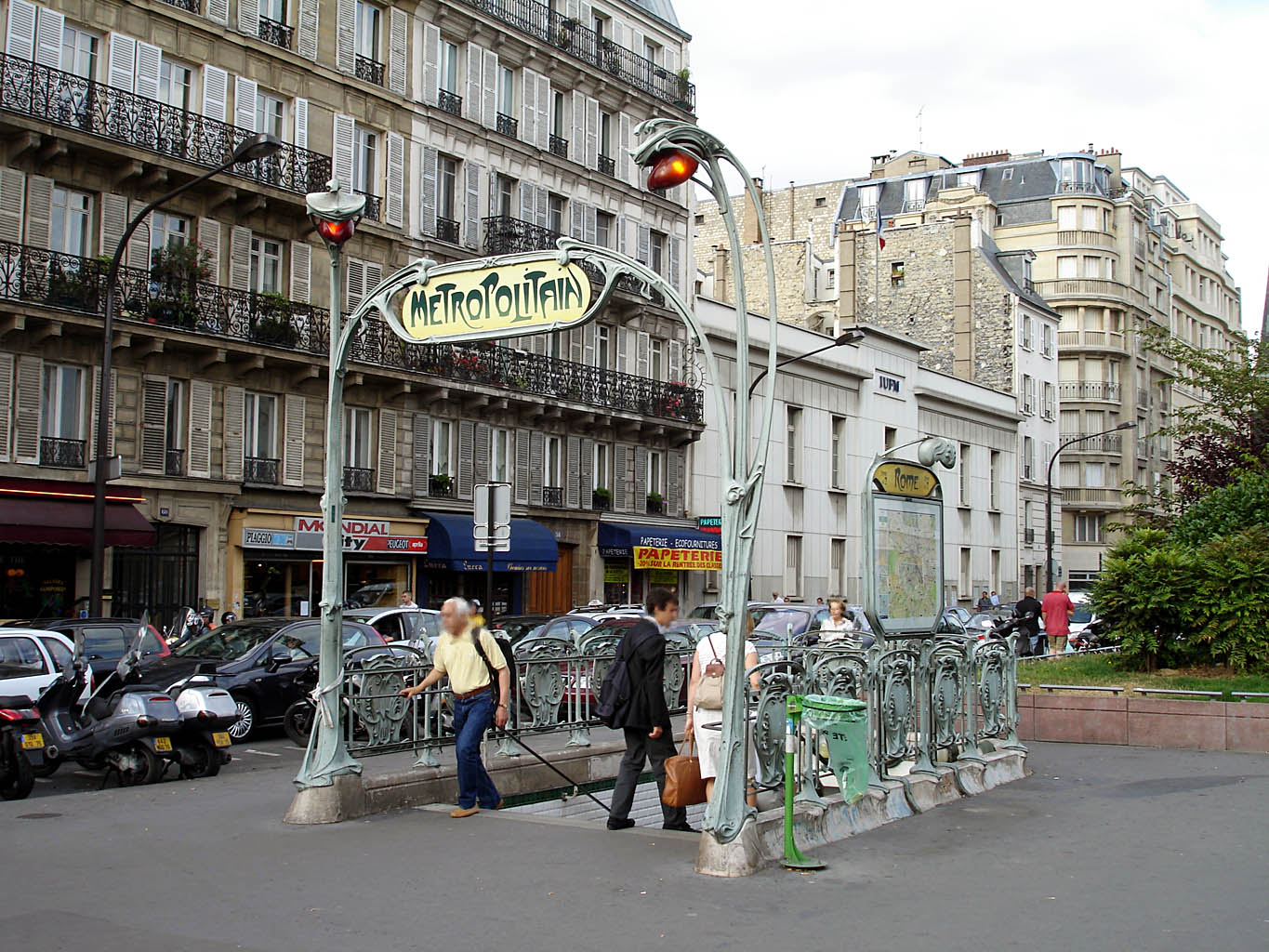
Rome station entrance

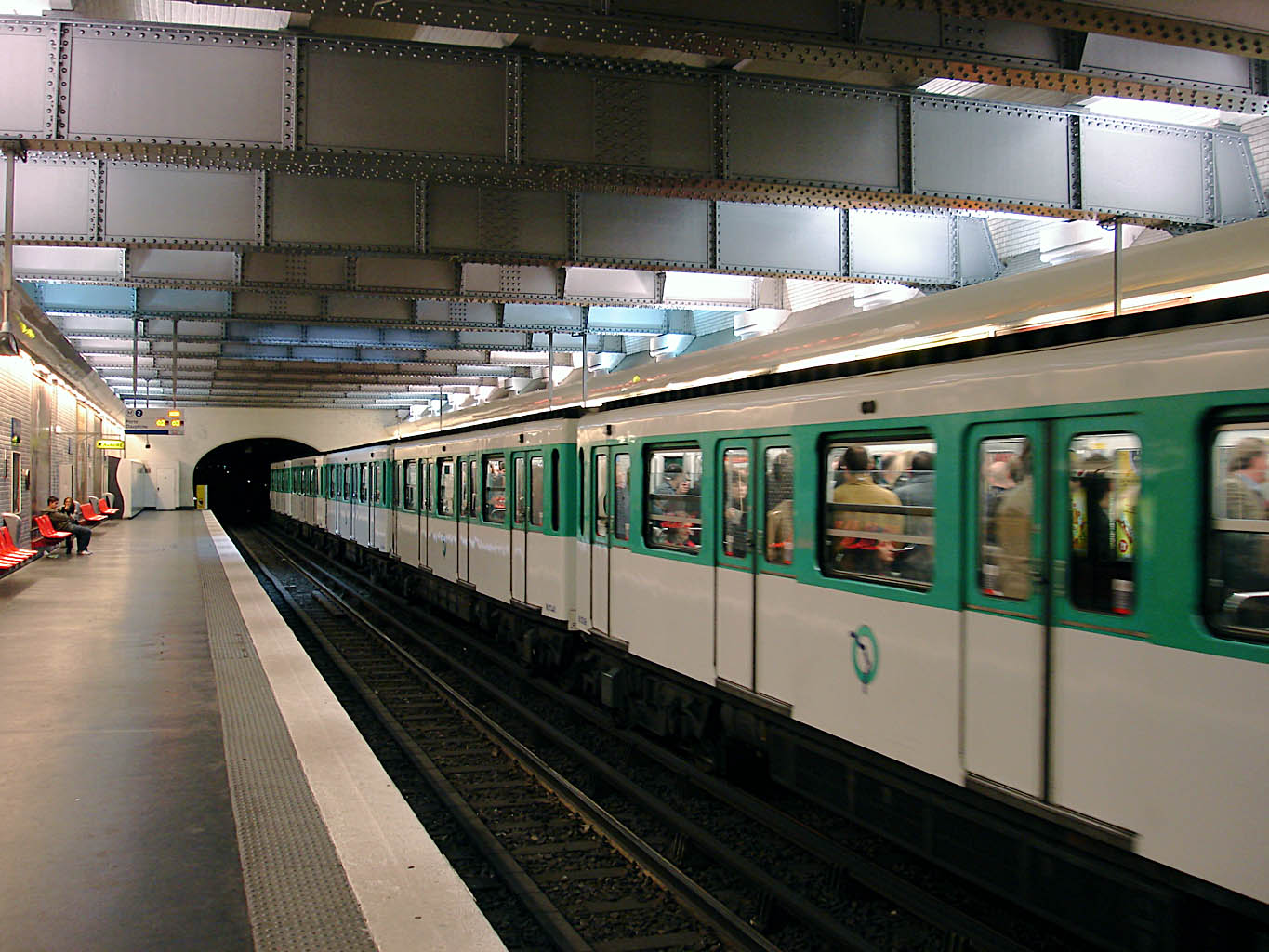
MF 67 rolling stock at Rome
