= Paris Metro entrances by Hector Guimard =

Series of Art Nouveau metro entrances

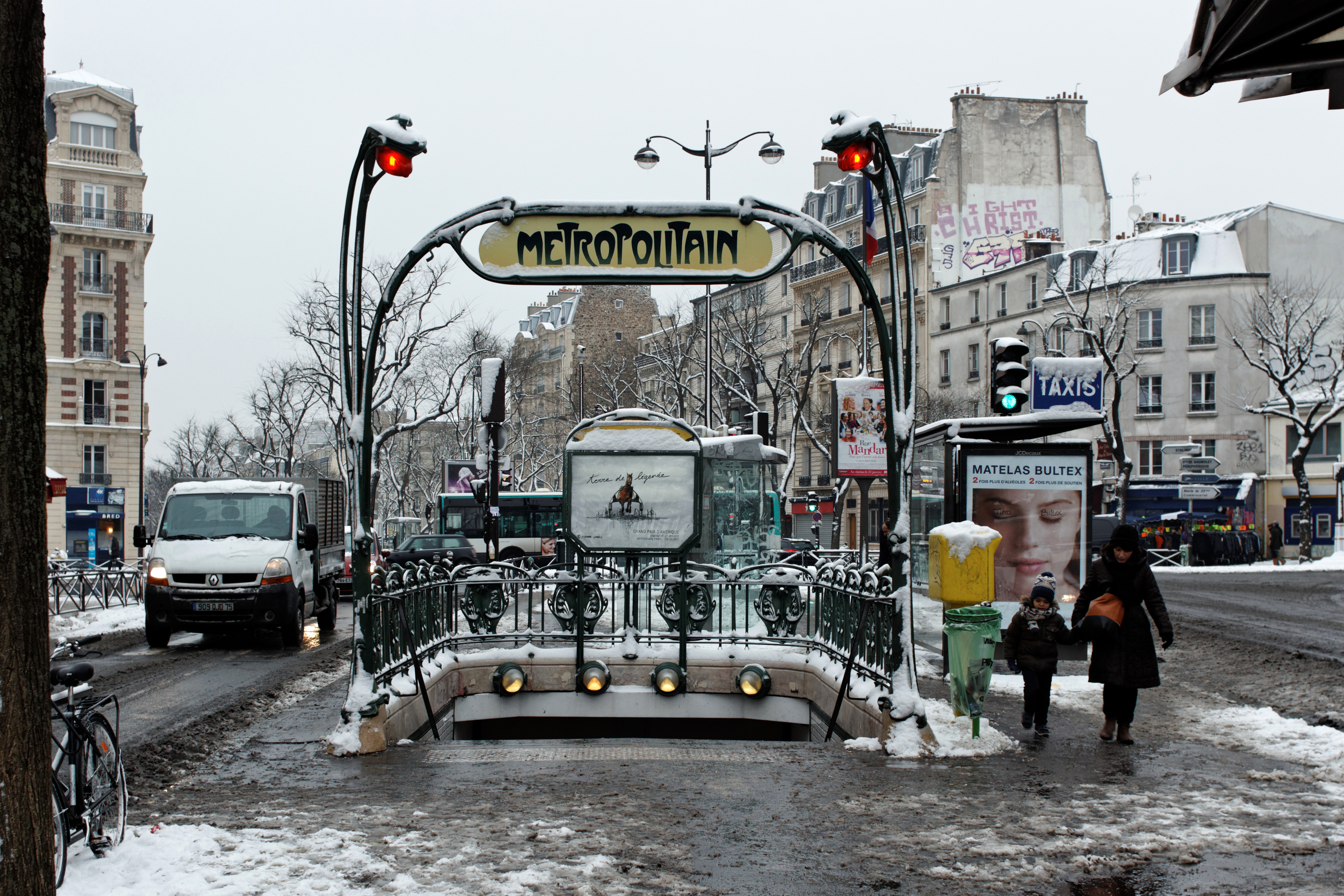
Winter view of the Guimard entrance to the Père Lachaise Métro station, in the 11th arrondissement

Between 1900 and 1913, Hector Guimard was responsible for the first generation of entrances to the underground stations of the Paris Metro. His Art Nouveau designs in cast iron and glass dating mostly to 1900, and the associated lettering that he also designed, created what became known as the Métro style (style Métro) and popularized Art Nouveau. However, arbiters of style were scandalized and the public was also less enamored of his more elaborate entrances. In 1904 his design for the Opéra station at Place de l'Opéra was rejected and his association with the Métro ended; many of his station entrances have been demolished, including all three of the pavilion type (at Bastille and on Avenue de Wagram at Étoile). Those that remain are now all protected historical monuments, one has been reconstituted, and some originals and replicas also survive outside France.

== Construction and characteristics ==
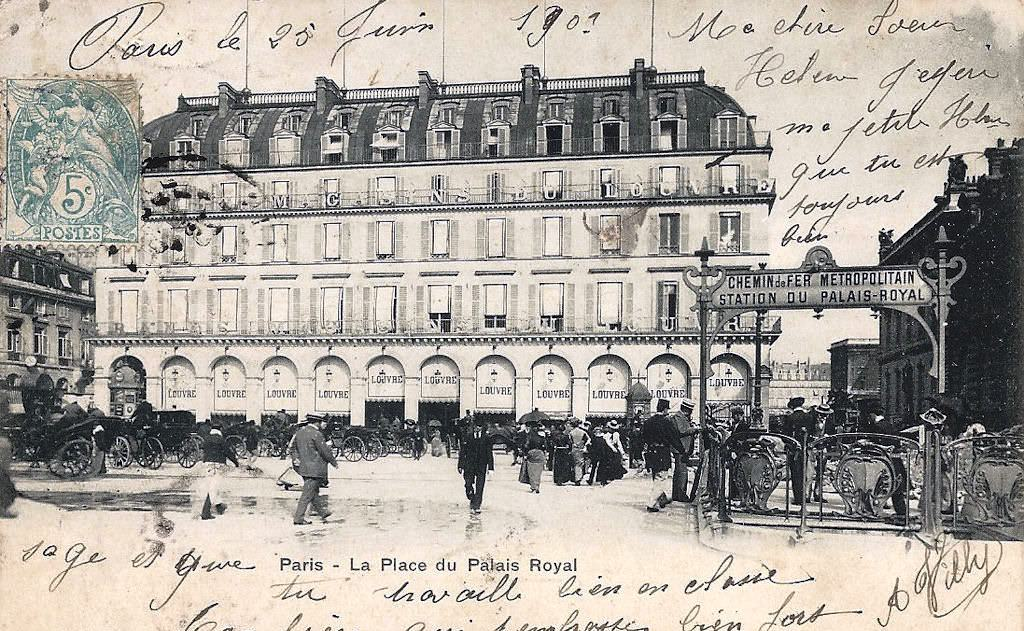
Palais Royal station (right) on a 1903 postcard; the Guimard entrance has yet to receive the arch with lights and "Métropolitain" sign, and instead is identified by a temporary wooden sign.

The initial network of the Paris Métropolitain (soon commonly abbreviated to "Métro") was planned and built at one time in order to minimize disruption to the city from on-going construction and to open Line 1 and two branches in time for the Exposition Universelle in 1900. A design competition was held for the above-ground components, to alleviate the public's fear that they would mar the cityscape with an industrial appearance. The new entrances were stipulated to be "as elegant as possible but above all very light, prioritising iron, glass and ceramic". However, the submitted entries were all too bulky for many of the sidewalk sites. Adrien Bénard, the financier whose bank was underwriting the construction, liked the new Art Nouveau style and therefore instead persuaded the Compagnie du chemin de fer métropolitain de Paris (CMP) to appoint the still young Hector Guimard to design the entrances to the underground stations, while the elevated stations were designed by Jean-Camille Formigé, chief architect of the City of Paris.

Rather than stone, Guimard used cast iron set in concrete both to reduce costs and to suit the sinuous Art Nouveau forms; they were painted in a green emulating weathered brass. (For a renovation that began in 1999, the RATP, the Paris transportation authority, restored the entrances to two slightly different shades: at sites with a lot of vegetation, vert wagon ('train-car green'), the dark green used for Parisian public works at the turn of the 20th century, and at fully urban sites, a slightly bluer shade, vert allemand ('German green').) He designed standardized components, including railing cartouches incorporating the letter "M" and signs in his own distinctive lettering reading "Métropolitain" or, at narrow entrances, "Métro"; later the use of the lettering was extended to a holder for a system map and for advertising (porte-plan) with the station name above. In addition to speed (the first set of entrances were installed within six months of their design) and relatively low cost in manufacture and adaptation to different sizes and locations of entrances, all of this gave the system a stylistic identity.

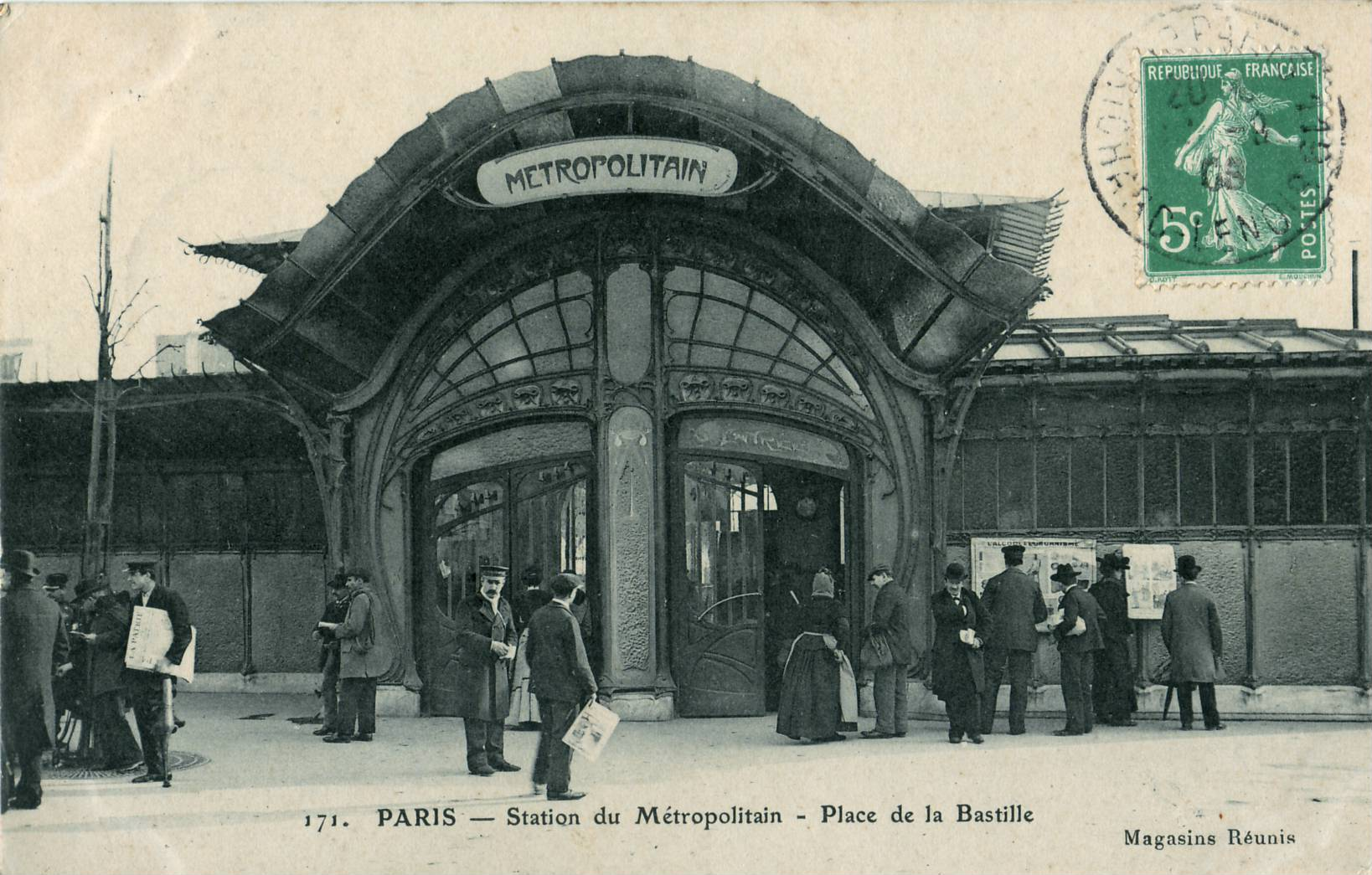
Bastille station entrance, now demolished, on another early postcard

Three of the entrances took the form of free-standing pavilions or small stations, including waiting rooms: one at Bastille and two on Avenue de Wagram at Étoile. These were in a style influenced by Japanese pagodas. At Étoile Guimard provided exterior doors for elevators, although the elevators were not built. Eight simpler but still elaborate structures, labeled "Édicule B" by Guimard, were installed at the termini of Line 1 as originally opened and at two other major stations. These consisted of three-sided glass-roofed structures enclosing the stairway, with a projecting canopy. (Note: Édicule has a broader meaning in French than Latin Aedicula; it is sometimes used for all the Guimard Metro entrances, not only for those with roofs.) A variation on this format, "Édicule A", lacked the canopy and was erected at two stations, Saint-Paul and Reuilly–Diderot. These édicule types of entrance, which have come to be called libellules because they resemble dragonflies, in some cases had decorated wall panels surfaced in reconstituted lava. The great majority of the entrances built (154) were unroofed enclosures, dubbed an entourage. A transitional form between the entourage and the édicule, railings with a roof and canopy, was used for one entrance at the Gare de Lyon metro station.

At many of the entourages, the top of the steps is surmounted by a "Métropolitain" or "Métro" sign in a holder that extends between two risers in the form of sinuous stalks, traditionally compared to lily of the valley (brin de muguet), each bearing a light in the form of a red-orange globe reminiscent of an eye or a flower. These were not ready until 1901, the year after the system first opened, and Guimard varied the "Métropolitain" lettering somewhat between stations and twice revised the design, which reached its final form in 1902.

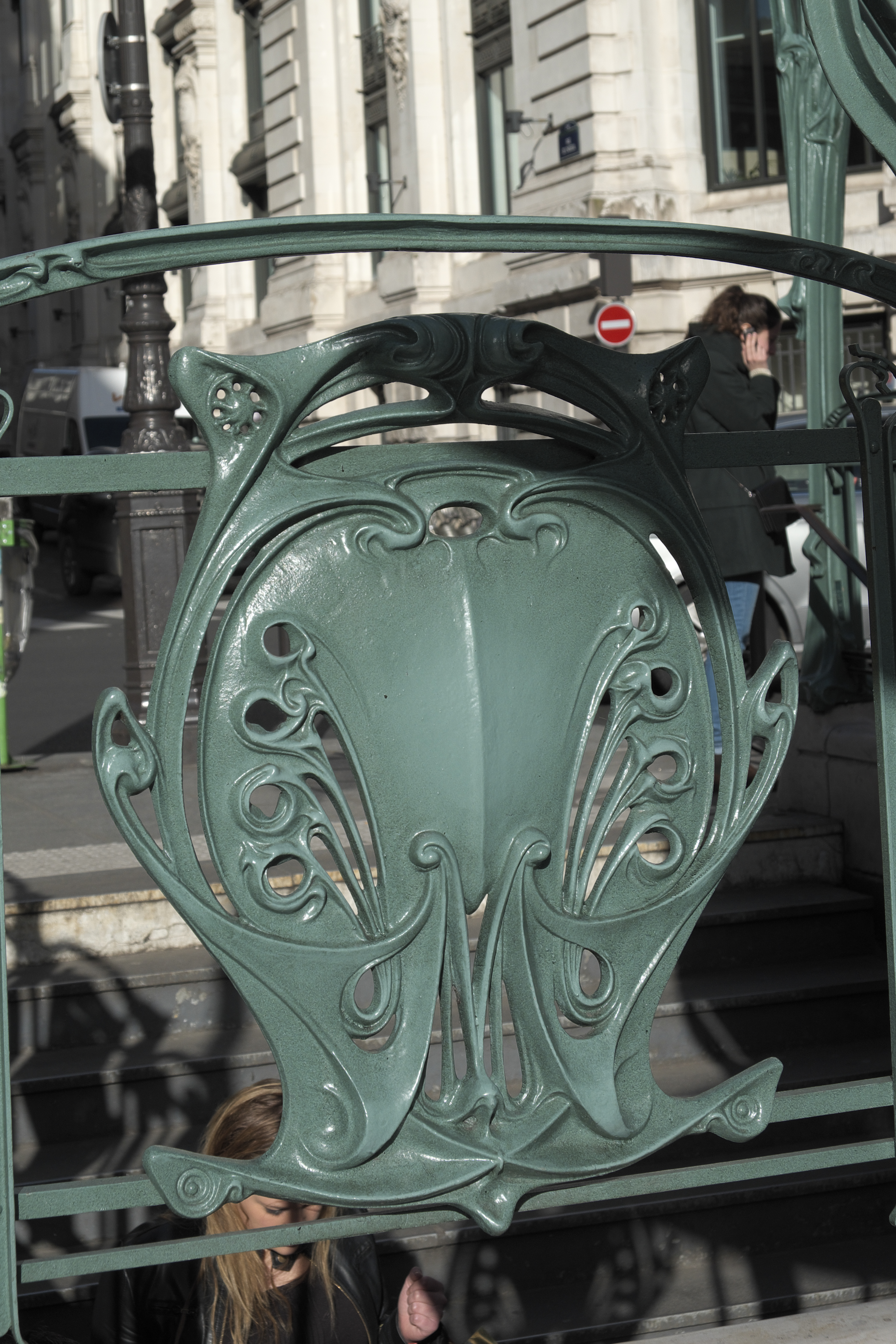
Railing escutcheon with "M", Quatre-Septembre

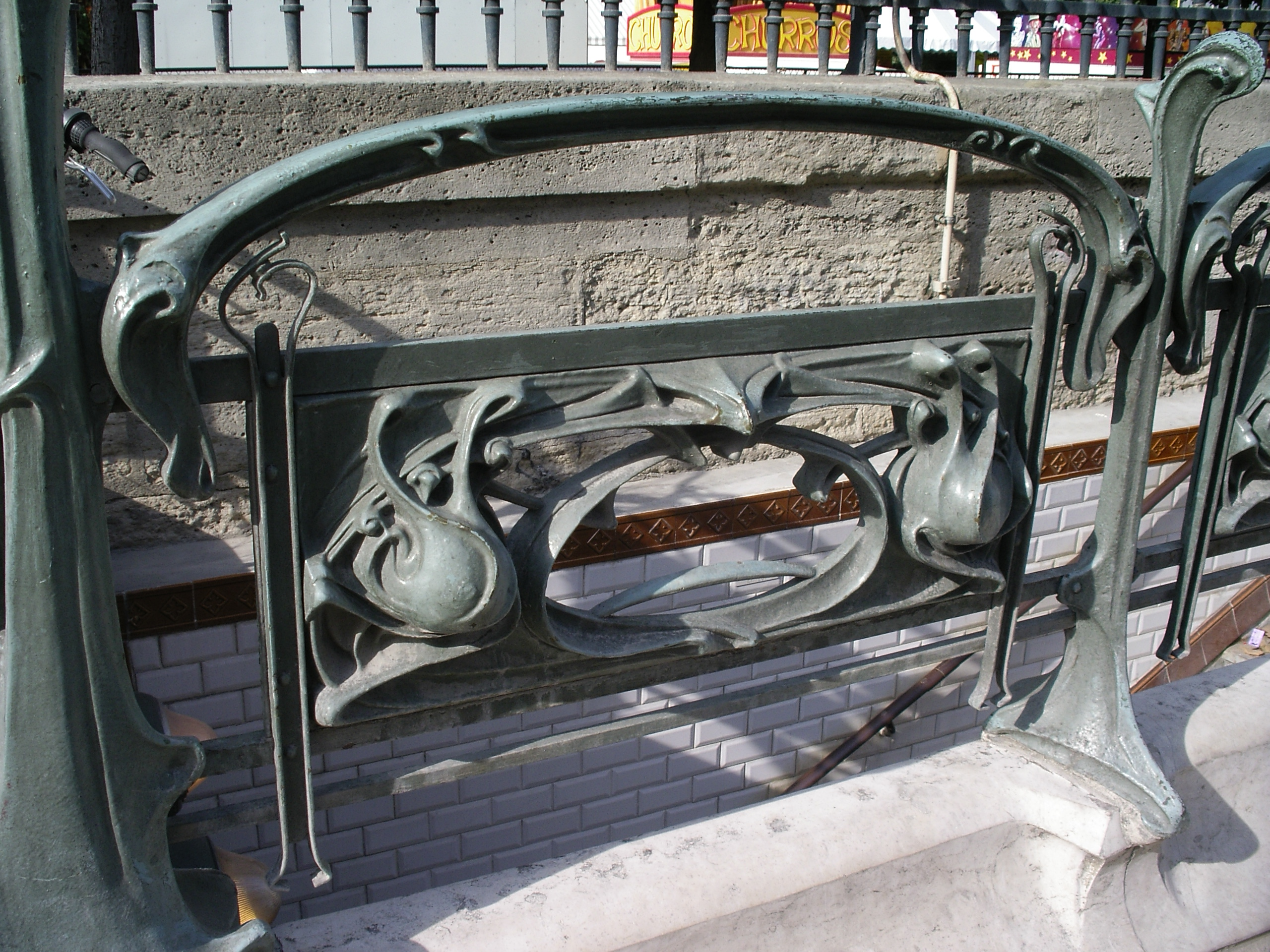
Hollow cartouche, Tuileries

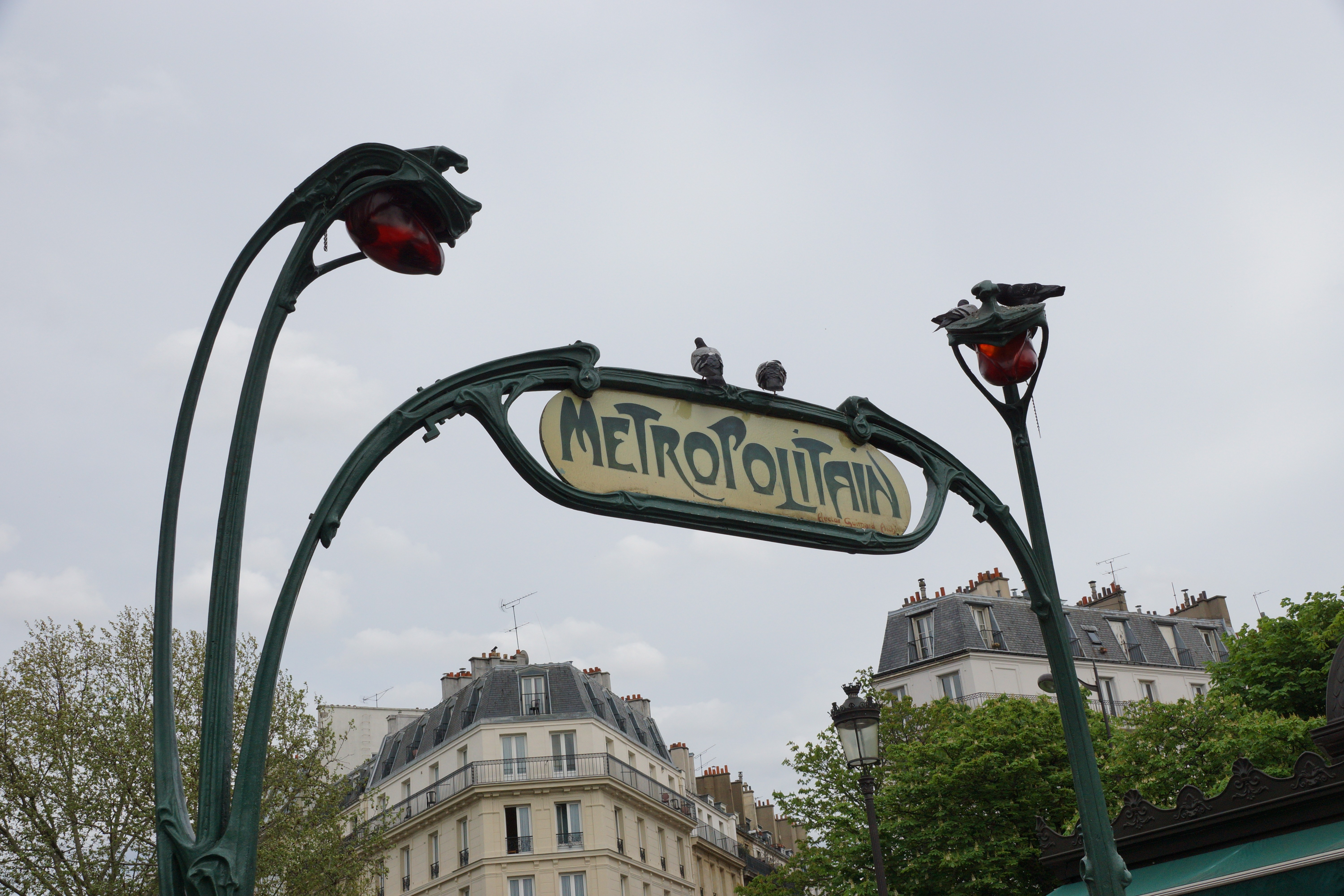
Lamps and "Métropolitain" sign, Anvers

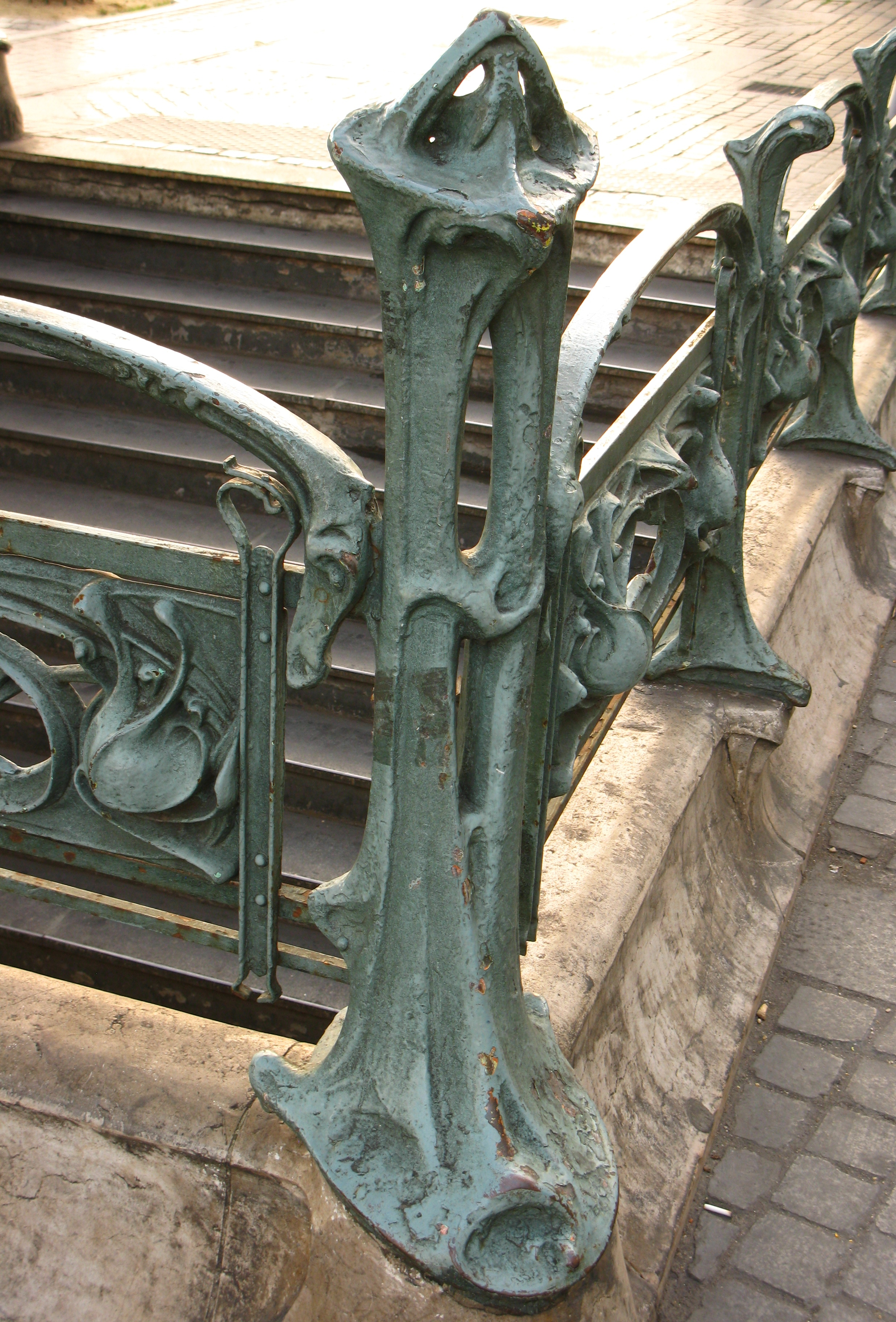
Corner post on simple enclosure, Place d'Italie

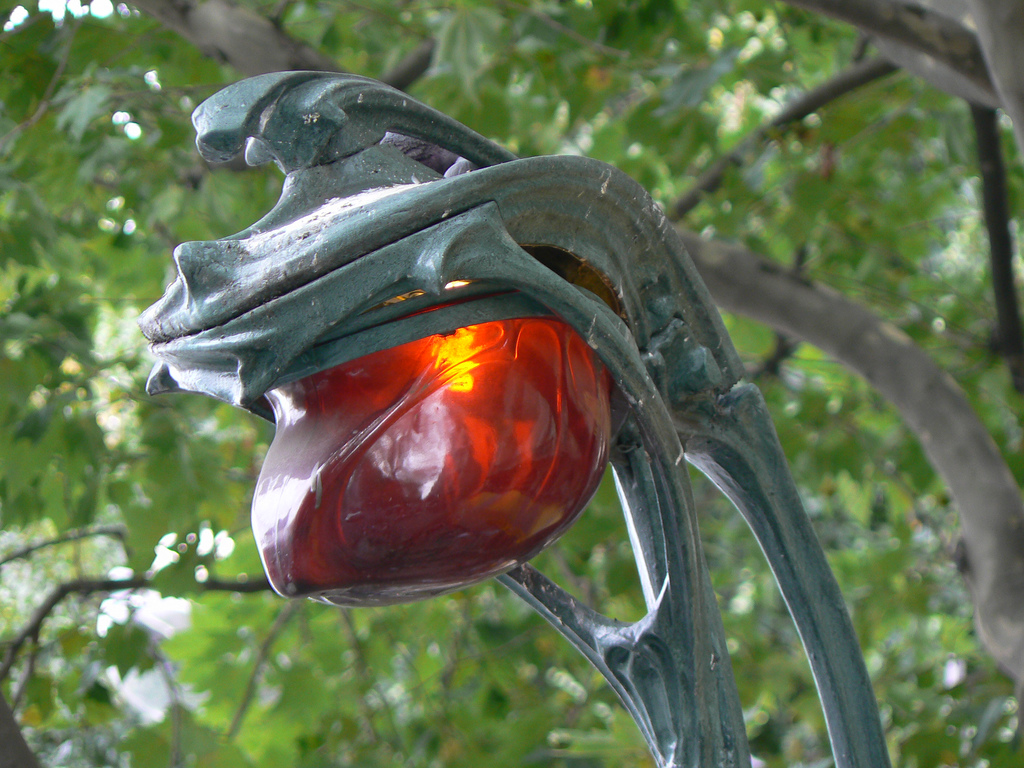
Close-up of entrance lamp

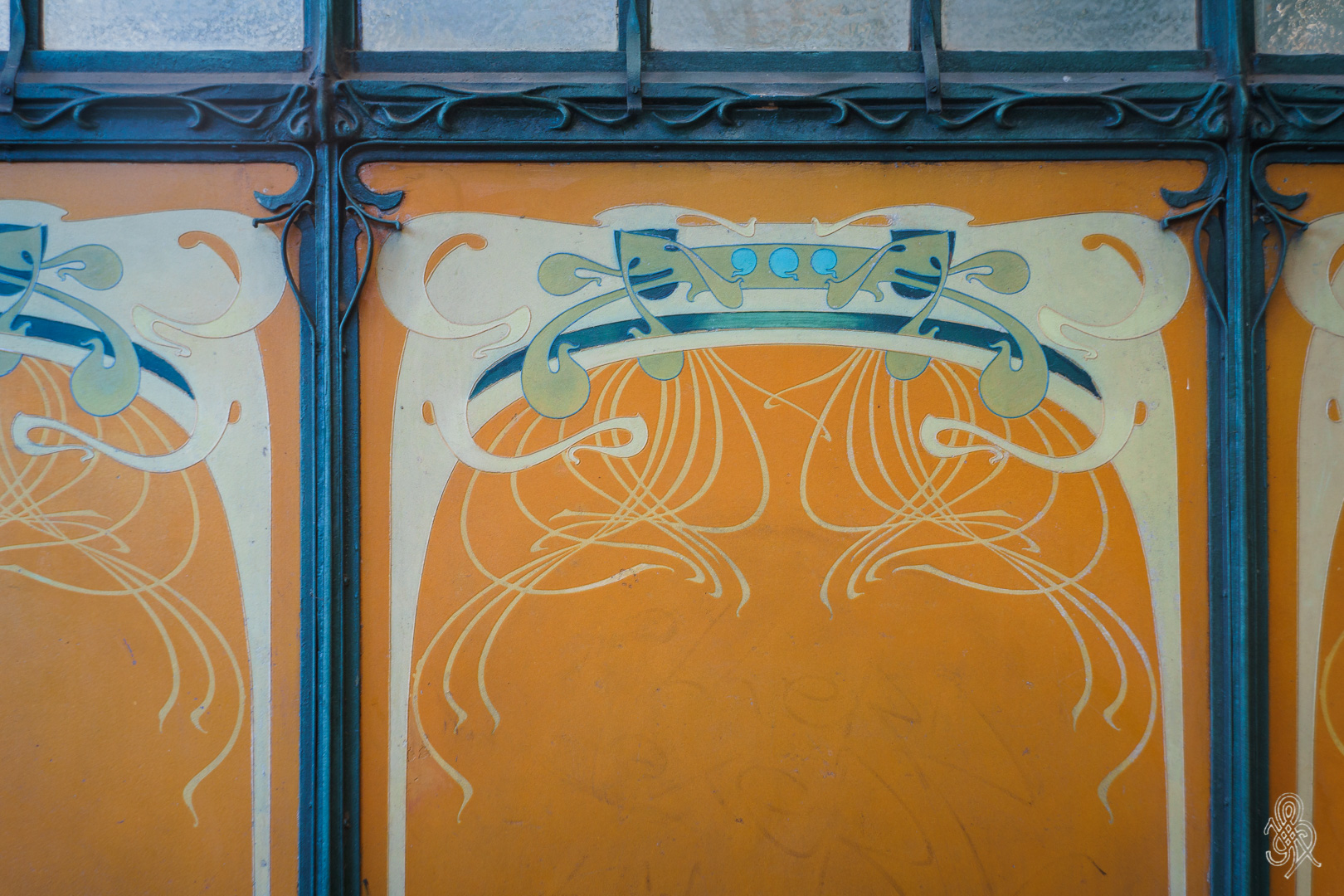
Design on wall panel of édicule, Porte Dauphine

== Reception and later history ==
The Guimard entrances received a generally warm reception. Salvador Dalí later called them "those divine entrances to the Métro, by grace of which one can descend into the region of the subconscious of the living and monarchical aesthetic of tomorrow". By way of what became known as le style Métro, they popularized Art Nouveau, which had been a style known largely to connoisseurs of the avant garde.

However, critics and many of the public were hostile to the libellules in particular, and criticized the green as "German" and the lettering as "un-French" and, according to critic André Hallays in Le Temps, "confus[ing to] little children who are trying to learn their letters and ... stupefy[ing to] foreigners". On the Champs-Élysées, for example at Marbeuf (now part of Franklin D. Roosevelt), simple stone walls with discreet carved signage were used instead, and a plain design was also used at Bourse. Unhappiness with Guimard's 1904 design for the Opéra station, described in Le Figaro as having "contorted ramps" and "enormous frog-eye lamps", and increasing costs led to the CMP severing its relationship with him. The entrance at Opéra was instead designed by Joseph-Marie Cassien-Bernard, in classical marble. The CMP bought Guimard's molds and rights and a total of 141 of his entrances were ultimately produced, the last in 1913.

The CMP continued in later years to replace some of Guimard's designs with more sober entrances by Cassien-Bernard, often a plain balustrade in white stone, for example at Gare de l'Est, Madeleine, Montparnasse, and Saint-François-Xavier. Modernization beginning after World War I also led to the demolition of many, especially the more elaborate. Shortly before World War II, it was suggested that those remaining should be scrapped for their metal. Art Nouveau had only briefly been in fashion and only became popular once more in the last quarter of the 20th century.

== Entrances extant today ==
Ninety-one Guimard entrances survived until 1970. Eighty-six are still extant and protected as historical monuments; six were protected in 1965, the remainder in 1978. These include two original Type B édicules: at Porte Dauphine, on its original site and with the wall panels, and at Abbesses (moved from Hôtel de Ville in 1974). A third Type B of varying form at Châtelet is a 2000 recreation. The remainder of the preserved entrances are simple enclosures or entourages, with or without the light and sign arch. In addition, two sides of an entourage form an entryway to the headquarters building of the RATP.

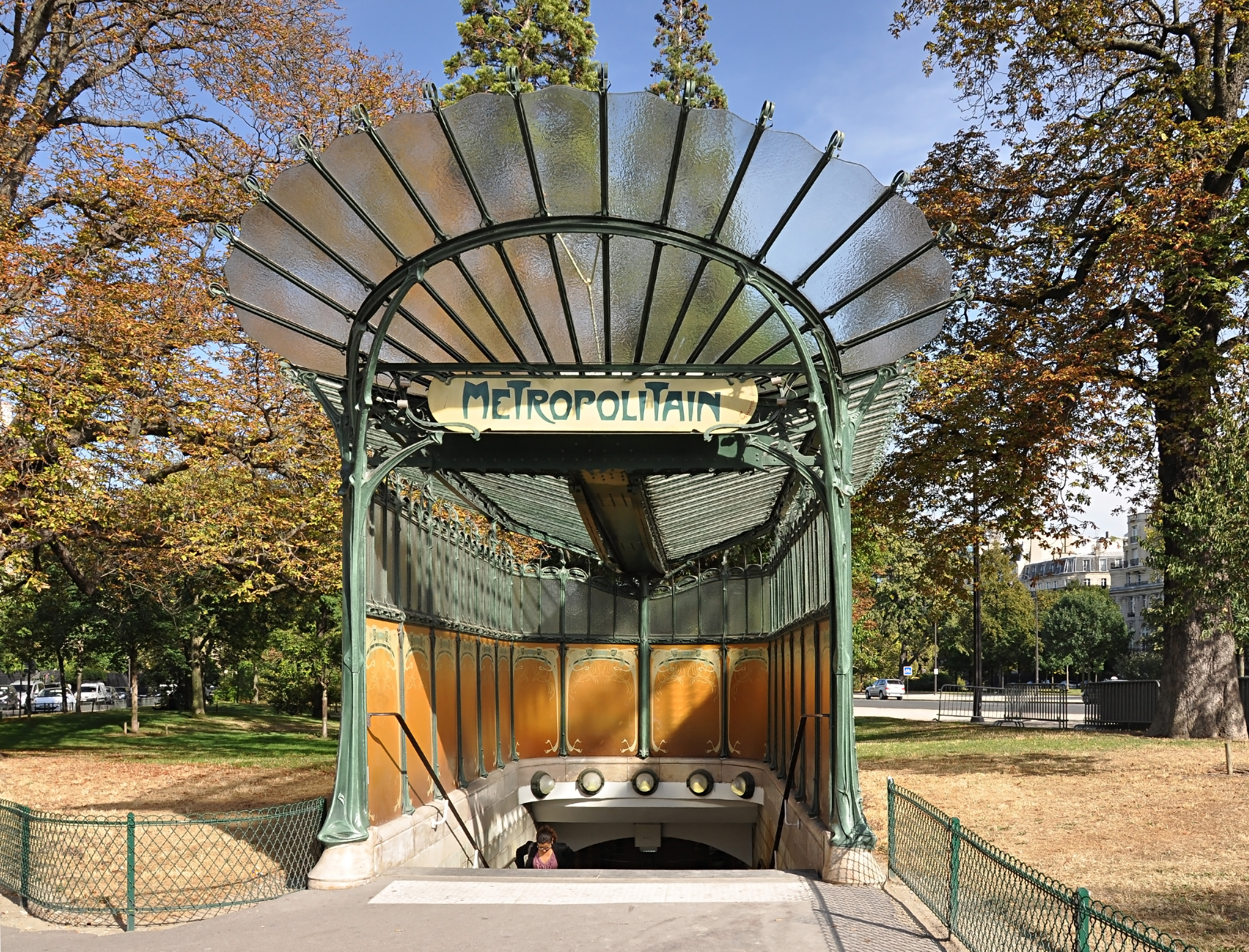
Original entrance at Porte Dauphine

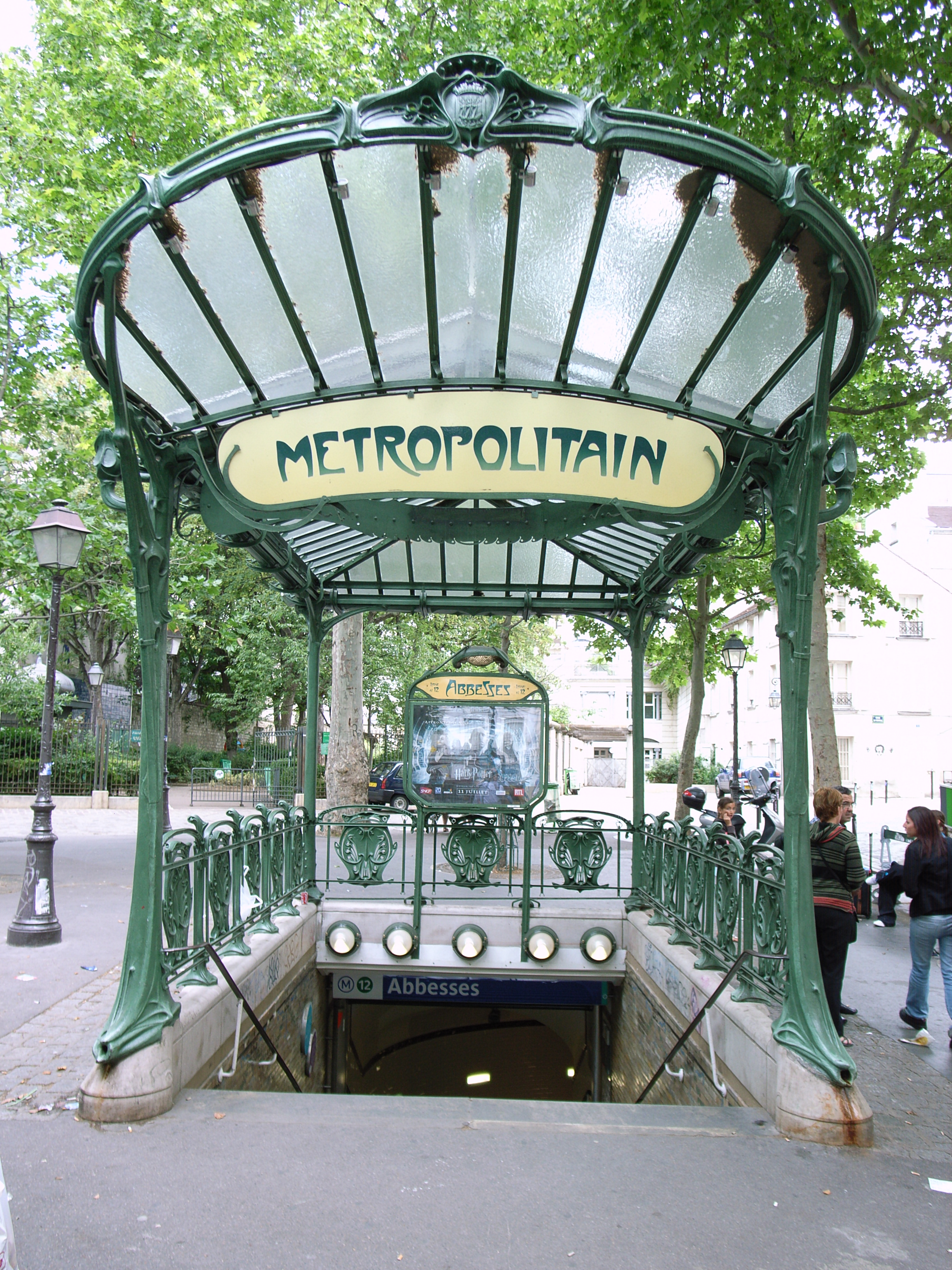
Entrance at Abbesses, originally at Hôtel de Ville

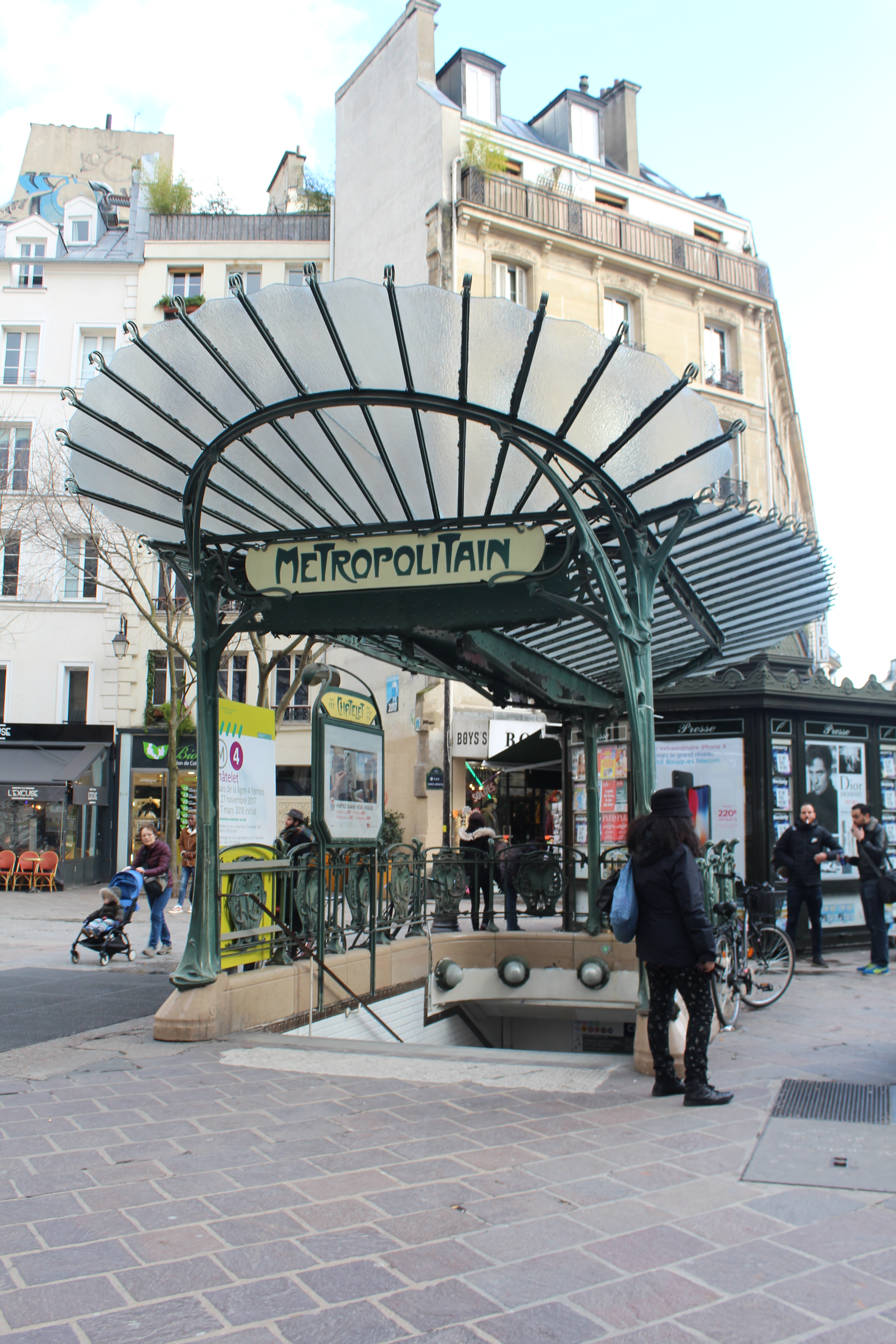
Recreated entrance at Châtelet

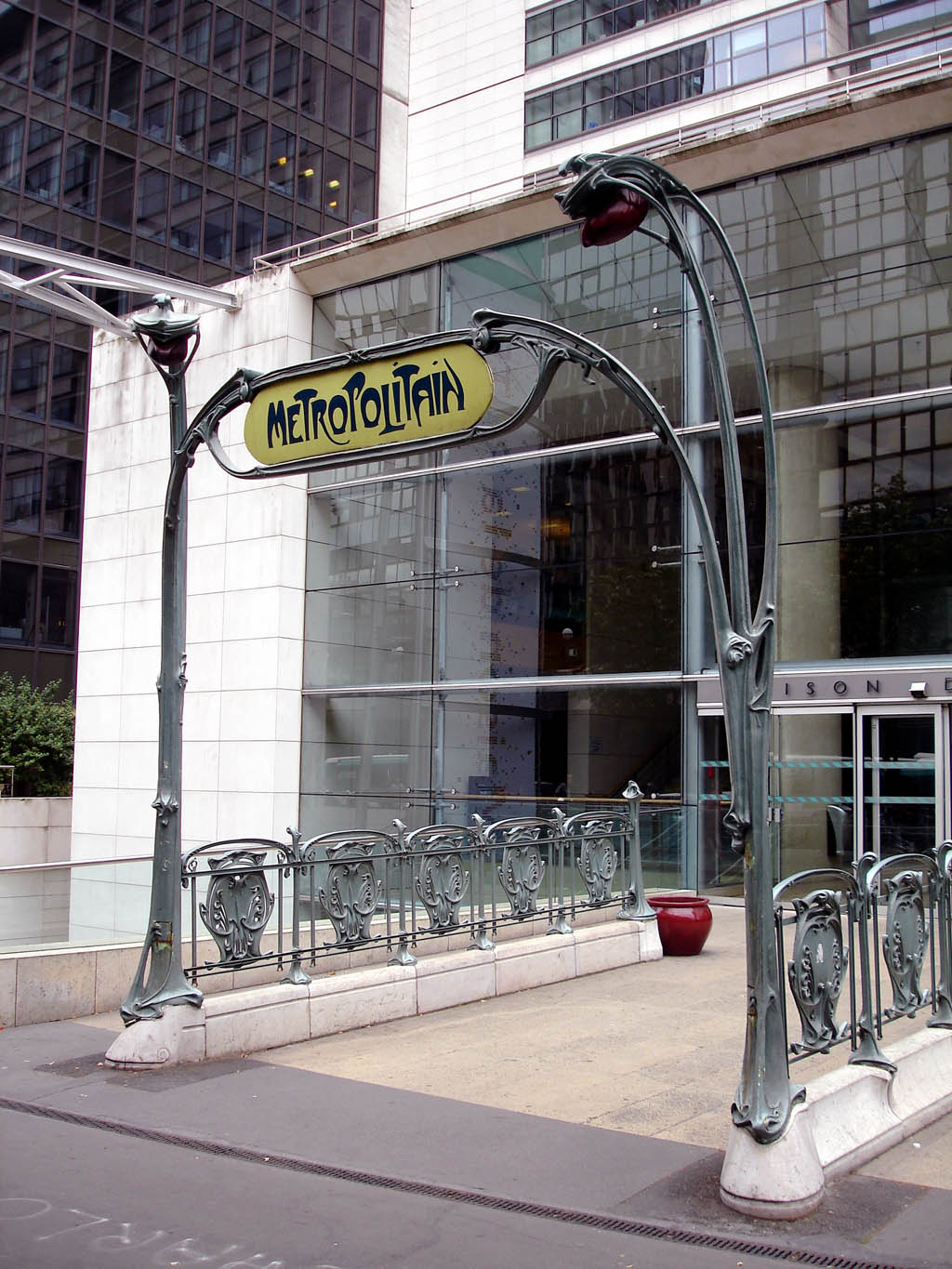
Entrance to RATP headquarters

=== Surviving Guimard entrances in Paris protected as historical monuments ===
Station	Arrondissement	Address	Base Mérimée	Coordinates	Photo
Châtelet	1st	Rue de Rivoli; Rue des Lavandières-Sainte-Opportune	PA00085986	48.859194°N 2.346222°E	
Étienne Marcel	1st	14 Rue de Turbigo	PA00085987	48.863694°N 2.348944°E	
Louvre–Rivoli	1st	Rue de l'Amiral-de-Coligny; Rue de Rivoli	PA00085988	48.860694°N 2.340889°E	
Palais Royal–Musée du Louvre	1st	Place du Palais-Royal	PA00085989	48.862392°N 2.33665°E	
Palais Royal–Musée du Louvre	1st	Place du Palais-Royal	PA00085989	48.862747°N 2.33632°E	
Palais Royal–Musée du Louvre	1st	Rue de Rivoli	PA00085989	48.862498°N 2.335609°E	
Tuileries	1st	Rue de Rivoli	PA00085990	48.864295°N 2.330077°E	
Tuileries	1st	Rue de Rivoli	PA00085990	48.864238°N 2.330252°E	
Quatre-Septembre	2nd	Rue du Quatre-Septembre; Rue de Choiseul	PA00086085	48.8695554°N 2.336803°E	
Réaumur–Sébastopol	2nd	63, 65 Rue Réaumur	PA00086086	48.866599°N 2.350522°E	
Réaumur–Sébastopol	2nd	63, 65 Rue Réaumur	PA00086086	48.86656°N 2.350686°E	
Réaumur–Sébastopol	2nd	28 Rue de Palestro	PA00086086	48.866477°N 2.352161°E	
Réaumur–Sébastopol	2nd	28 Rue de Palestro	PA00086086	48.866572°N 2.352217°E	
Sentier	2nd	87 Rue Réaumur	PA00086087	48.8667084°N 2.3504533°E	
Temple	3rd	Rue du Temple; Rue de Turbigo	PA00086229	48.866615°N 2.36155°E	
Cité	3rd	Place Louis-Lépine	PA00086471	48.855625°N 2.347397°E	
Cité	4th	Place Louis-Lépine	PA00086471	48.855215°N 2.347142°E	
Saint-Michel	5th	Boulevard Saint-Michel (between Quai Saint-Michel and Rue de la Huchette)	PA00088479	48.853511°N 2.344521°E	
Saint-Michel	5th	Boulevard Saint-Michel (between Rue de la Huchette and Rue Saint-Séverin)	PA00088479	48.85325°N 2.344194°E	
Saint-Michel	6th	Place Saint-André-des-Arts	PA00088648	48.85315°N 2.34295°E	
Europe	8th	Rue de Madrid	PA00088871	48.87887°N 2.32274°E	
Saint-Lazare	8th	Rue de Rome; Rue de l'Arcade	PA00088872	48.87476°N 2.32471°E	
Cadet	9th	65 Rue La Fayette; 17 Rue Cadet	PA00088991	48.876°N 2.344027778°E	
Opéra	9th	Rue Auber; Rue Scribe	PA00088992	48.87158333°N 2.330666667°E	
Château d'Eau	10th	49–51 Boulevard de Strasbourg	PA00086508	48.872537°N 2.355919°E	
Château d'Eau	10th	49–51 Boulevard de Strasbourg	PA00086508	48.872447°N 2.355873°E	
Colonel Fabien	10th	Place du Colonel Fabien	PA00086509	48.8775°N 2.370806°E	
Gare du Nord	10th	9 Boulevard de Denain	PA00086510	48.879772°N 2.35445°E	
Gare du Nord	10th	2 Boulevard de Denain; 129 Rue La Fayette	PA00086510	48.878736°N 2.354261°E	
Gare du Nord	10th	12 Boulevard de Denain	PA00086510	48.879725°N 2.354825°E	
Louis Blanc	10th	221 Rue La Fayette; 223 Rue du Faubourg Saint-Martin	PA00086511	48.881389°N 2.365333°E	
République	10th	Place de la République at Boulevard de Magenta	PA00086550	48.868333°N 2.363056°E	
Bréguet–Sabin	11th	23 Boulevard Richard-Lenoir	PA00086545	48.856606°N 2.370499°E	
Bréguet–Sabin	11th	9 Boulevard Richard-Lenoir	PA00086545	48.85565°N 2.37007°E	
Couronnes	11th	Boulevard de Belleville	PA00086546	48.869057°N 2.38041°E	
Ménilmontant	11th	Boulevard de Ménilmontant	PA00086547	48.866674°N 2.383242°E	
Parmentier	11th	88 bis Avenue Parmentier	PA00086548	48.865436°N 2.374562°E	
Père Lachaise	11th	Boulevard de Ménilmontant	PA00086549	48.862682°N 2.387488°E	
Père Lachaise	11th	103 Avenue de la République	PA00086549	48.863197°N 2.385922°E	
Richard-Lenoir	11th	65 Boulevard Richard-Lenoir	PA00086551	48.864402°N 2.37859°E	
Rue Saint-Maur	11th	74 Avenue de la République	PA00086552	48.864444°N 2.378611°E	
Bastille	12th	Boulevard Beaumarchais (moved from Rue de Lyon)	PA00086576	48.853056°N 2.369167°E	
Daumesnil	12th	Place Félix-Éboué, center island	PA00086577	48.839722°N 2.395833°E	
Gare de Lyon	12th	Boulevard Diderot, forecourt of rail terminal	PA00086578	48.845556°N 2.372778°E	
Nation	12th	Place de la Nation, at Boulevard Diderot	PA00086579	48.848056°N 2.395°E	
Nation	12th	Place de la Nation, at Avenue Dorian	PA00086580	48.847778°N 2.395139°E	
Picpus	12th	Avenue de Saint-Mandé	PA00086581	48.845278°N 2.400556°E	
Campo Formio	13th	Boulevard de l'Hôpital	PA00086599	48.835556°N 2.358333°E	
Place d'Italie	13th	Place d'Italie	PA00086600	48.830833°N 2.355278°E	
Place d'Italie	13th	Place d'Italie	PA00086600	48.830833°N 2.354722°E	
Saint-Marcel	13th	Boulevard de l'Hôpital	PA00086601	48.838333°N 2.360833°E	
Denfert-Rochereau	14th	Place Denfert-Rochereau	PA00086630	48.834175°N 2.331982°E	
Mouton-Duvernet	14th	Avenue du Général Leclerc	PA00086631	48.831577°N 2.329931°E	
Mouton-Duvernet	14th	Avenue du Général Leclerc	PA00086631	48.831145°N 2.329569°E	
Raspail	14th	Boulevard Raspail; Boulevard Edgar-Quinet	PA00086632	48.838965°N 2.33055°E	
Pasteur	15th	Boulevard Pasteur	PA00086657	48.842667°N 2.31275°E	
Boissière	16th	Avenue Kléber	PA00086695	48.86691667°N 2.290222222°E	
Chardon Lagache	16th	Rue Molitor; Rue Chardon-Lagache	PA00086696	48.845009°N 2.266485°E	
Église d'Auteuil	16th	Rue d'Auteuil; Rue Chardon-Lagache	PA00086698	48.847387°N 2.268594°E	
Kléber	16th	Avenue Kléber	PA00086699	48.871695°N 2.293387°E	
Kléber	16th	Avenue Kléber	PA00086699	48.871625°N 2.293616°E	
Mirabeau	16th	Rue Mirabeau	PA00086700	48.84738889°N 2.273305556°E	
Porte d'Auteuil	16th	Boulevard de Montmorency	PA00086701	48.848094°N 2.260053°E	
Porte Dauphine	16th	Avenue Foch	PA00086697	48.872149°N 2.277051°E	
Porte Dauphine	16th	Avenue Bugeaud	PA00086697	48.871426°N 2.276758°E	
Victor Hugo	16th	Place Victor-Hugo; Avenue Victor-Hugo; Rue Léonard-de-Vinci	PA00086702	48.869946°N 2.285647°E	
Monceau	17th	Boulevard de Courcelles	PA00086724	48.880278°N 2.310278°E	
Rome	17th	Boulevard des Batignolles	PA00086725	48.8825°N 2.321944°E	
Ternes	17th	Place des Ternes	PA00086726	48.878056°N 2.298611°E	
Villiers	17th	Boulevard de Courcelles	PA00086727	48.881111°N 2.315°E	
Wagram	17th	Rue Brémontier; Avenue de Villiers	PA00086728	48.884167°N 2.303611°E	
Abbesses	18th	Place des Abbesses	PA00086748	48.884444°N 2.338889°E	
Anvers	18th	70 Boulevard de Rochechouart	PA00086749	48.88283333°N 2.343777778°E	
Barbès–Rochechouart	18th	Boulevard de Rochechouart; Relocated to Bolivar in 1987	PA00086750	48.88375°N 2.349361111°E	
Blanche	18th	Boulevard de Clichy	PA00086751	48.88369444°N 2.332888889°E	
Pigalle	18th	16 Boulevard de Clichy	PA00086752	48.88227778°N 2.337916667°E	
Place de Clichy	18th	130 Boulevard de Clichy	PA00086753	48.884286°N 2.329062°E	
Place de Clichy	18th	Place de Clichy	PA00086753	48.883605°N 2.327852°E	
Bolivar	19th	Avenue Simon-Bolivar; Relocated from Barbès–Rochechouart in 1987	PA00086750	48.880502°N 2.3749217°E	
Botzaris	19th	Rue Botzaris	PA00086768	48.879722°N 2.389167°E	
Crimée	19th	185, Rue de Crimée; 2 Rue Mathis	PA00086769	48.891389°N 2.3775°E	
Jaurès	19th	184 Boulevard de la Villette	PA00086770	48°52′54″N 2°22′13″E	
Pré-Saint-Gervais	19th	Boulevard Sérurier; Rue Alphonse-Aulard	PA00086771	48.88°N 2.398889°E	
Alexandre Dumas	20th	Boulevard de Charonne	PA00086784	48.855833°N 2.394722°E	
Avron	20th	Boulevard de Charonne	PA00086785	48.851944°N 2.397778°E	
Gambetta	20th	Place Martin-Nadaud	PA00086786	48.865°N 2.398333°E	
Philippe Auguste	20th	Boulevard de Charonne	PA00086787	48.858056°N 2.390833°E	

=== Guimard entrances elsewhere ===
Some subway systems and museums outside France have examples of Guimard Métro entrances, mostly replicas presented by the RATP in exchange for art works.

- Entourage Guimard: Square-Victoria–OACI station on the Montreal Metro in Canada has a genuine Guimard entrance made from parts of demolished Paris entrances (with map holder and "Métropolitain" sign and holder reproduced from the original molds). It was installed in 1967. During restoration in 2001–2002, it was found to have the last examples of the original glass light globes, which in Paris had been replaced with plastic for safety; one was returned to the RATP and the other placed on display in the Montreal Museum of Fine Arts.
- Bellas Artes station on the Mexico City Metro in Mexico has a Guimard entrance installed in 1998.
- Picoas station on the Lisbon Metro in Portugal has a Guimard entrance installed in 1995.
- Kievskaya station on the Moscow Metro in Russia has a Guimard entrance installed in 2007.
- Van Buren Street station on the Metra Electric District in Chicago had a Guimard entrance installed in 2001.
- An Entrance to the Paris Métropolitain: The National Gallery of Art in Washington, D.C., United States has a Guimard entrance in its sculpture garden, first shown at the gallery in a 2000–2001 exhibition on Art Nouveau and permanently installed in the garden in 2003.
- The Museum of Modern Art in New York City, United States has the archway consisting of the light stalks and "Métropolitain" sign from the Guimard entrance to Raspail station.
- The Dali Theater Museum in Figueres (Girona, Spain) has a pair of the light stalks from a Guimard Métro entrance, which are exhibited on the patio.
- The Toledo Museum of Art in Toledo, Ohio, houses several artifacts by Guimard including a metro entrance installed outside.
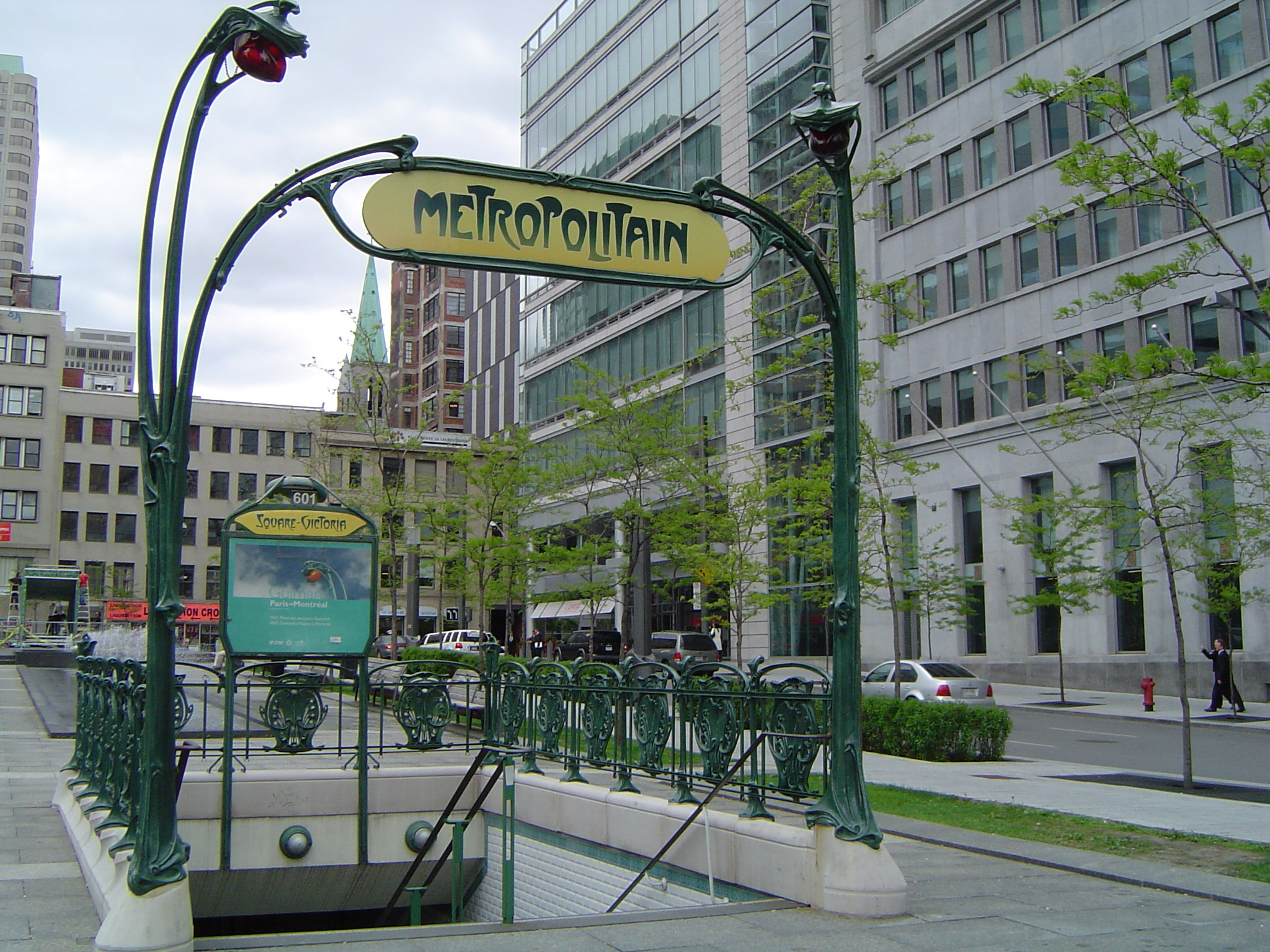
Square-Victoria–OACI, Montreal

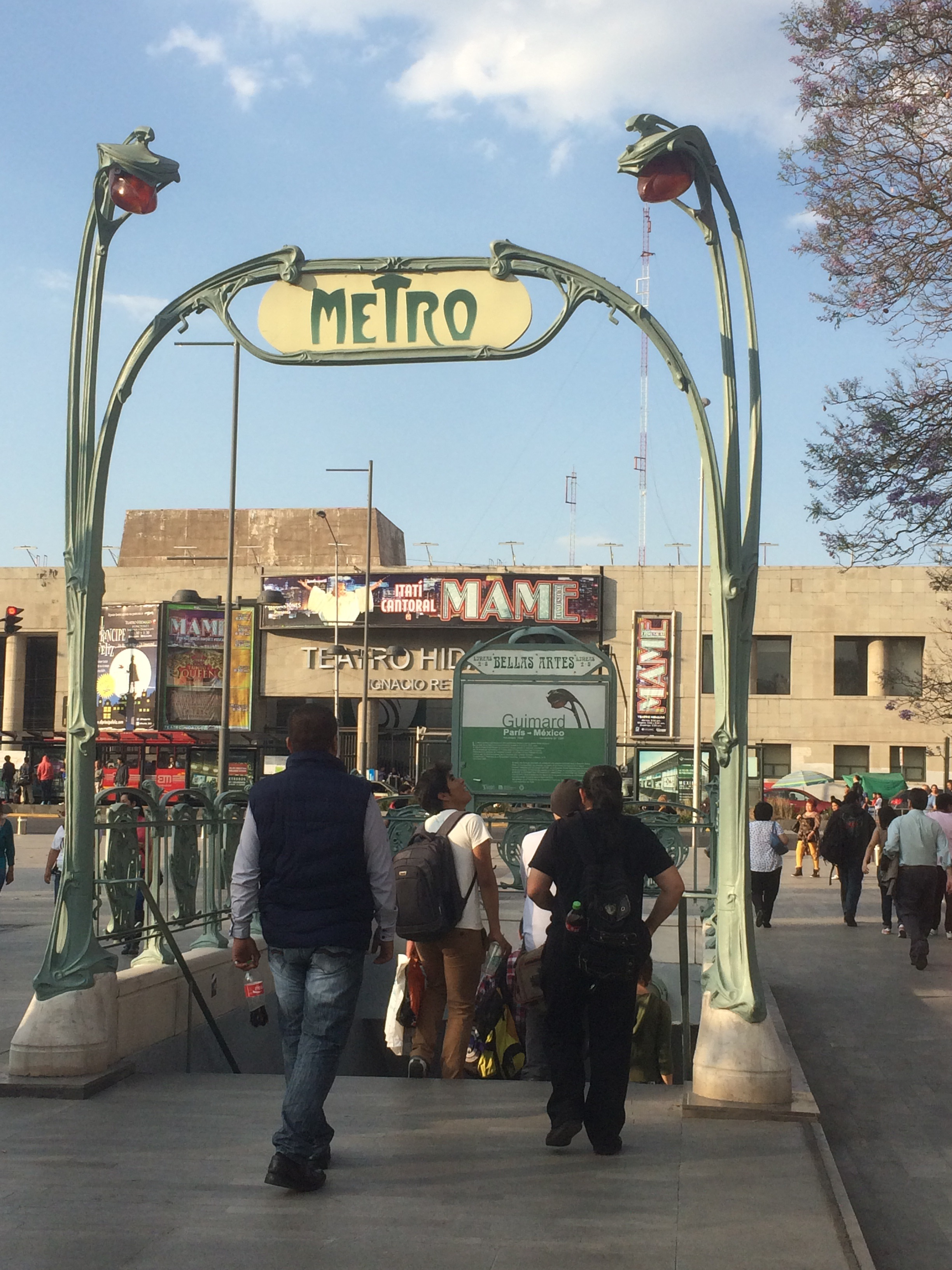
Bellas Artes, Mexico City

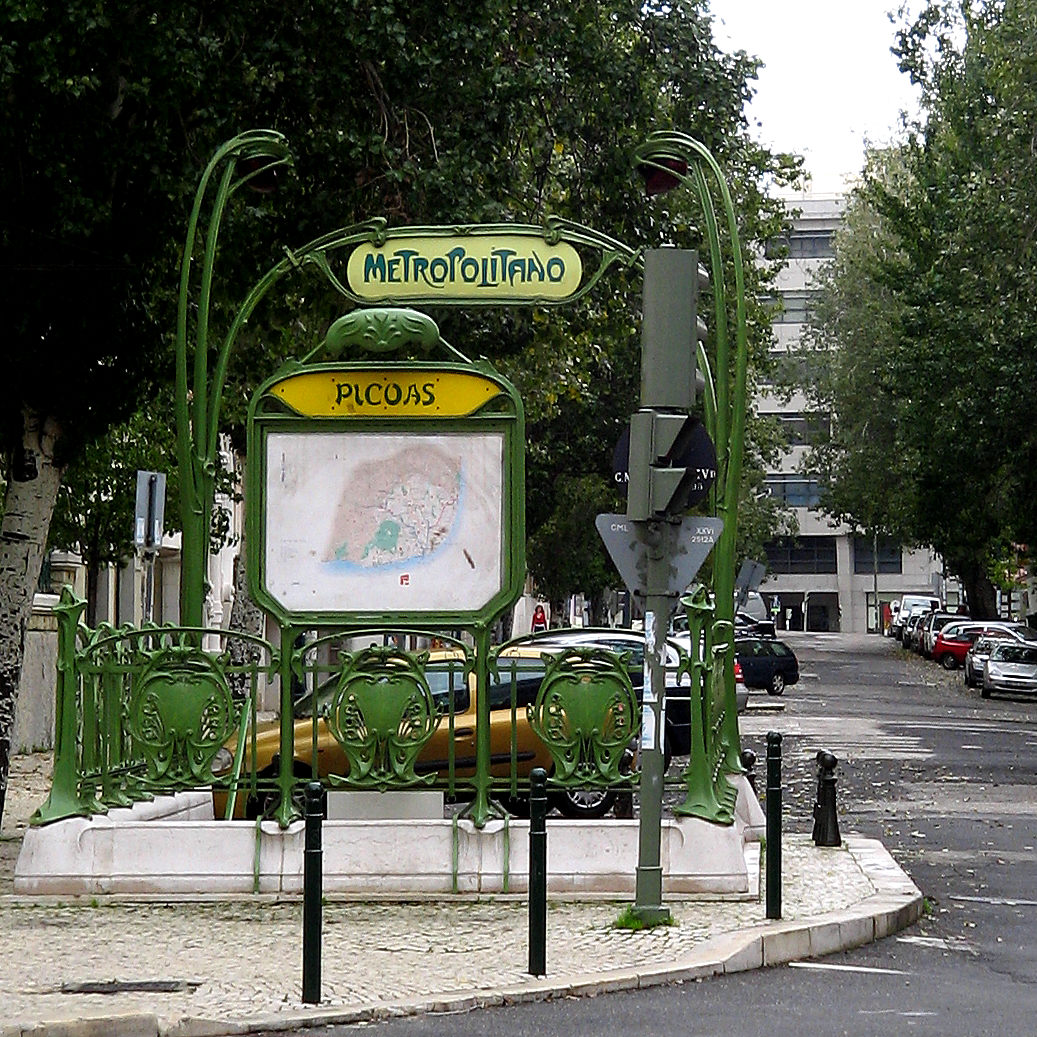
Picoas, Lisbon

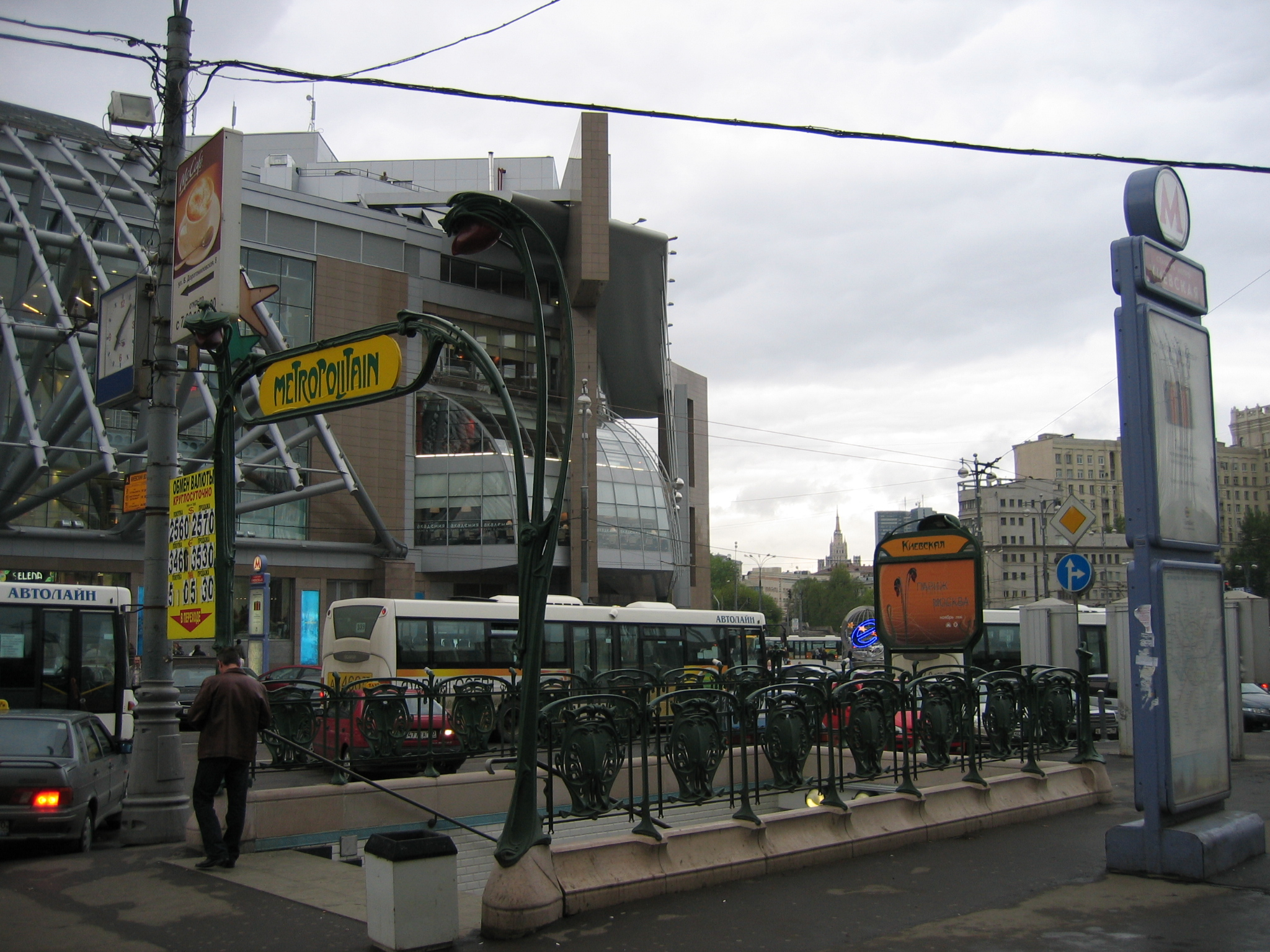
Kievskaya, Moscow

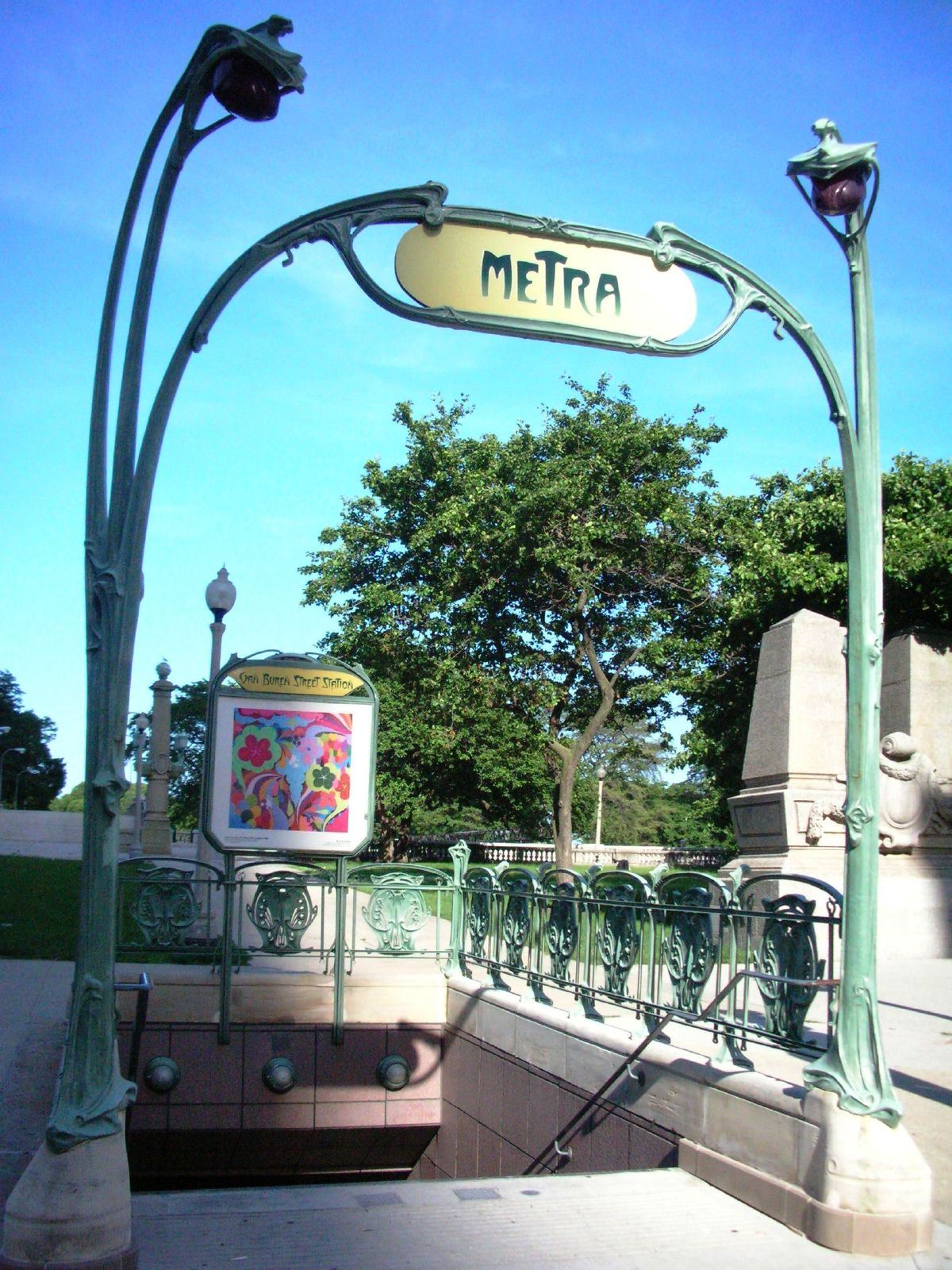
Van Buren Street, Chicago

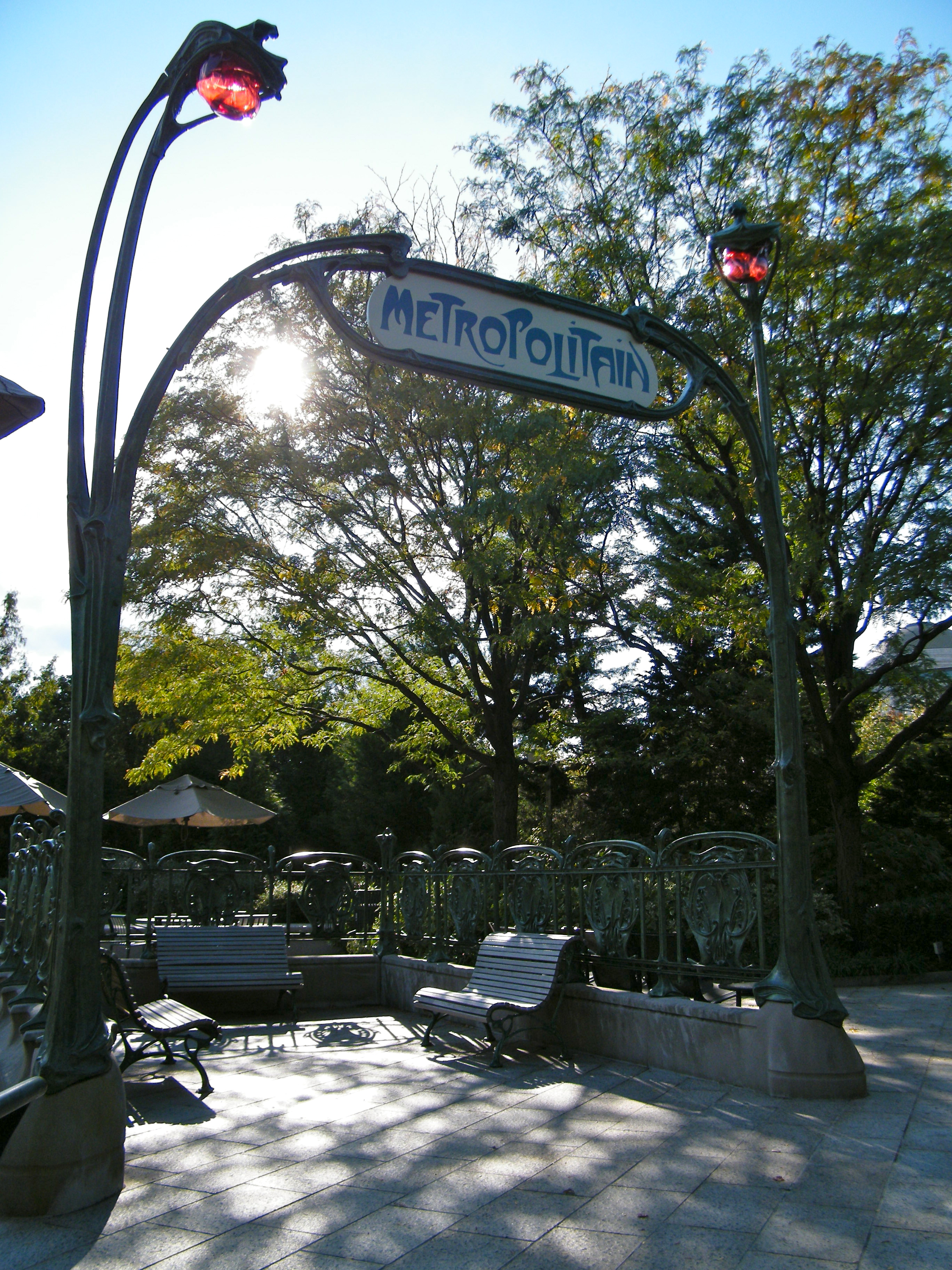
National Gallery of Art Sculpture Garden, Washington, D.C.

== See also ==
- Architecture of the Paris Metro
