= Place de Clichy station =

Metro station in Paris, France

Place de Clichy
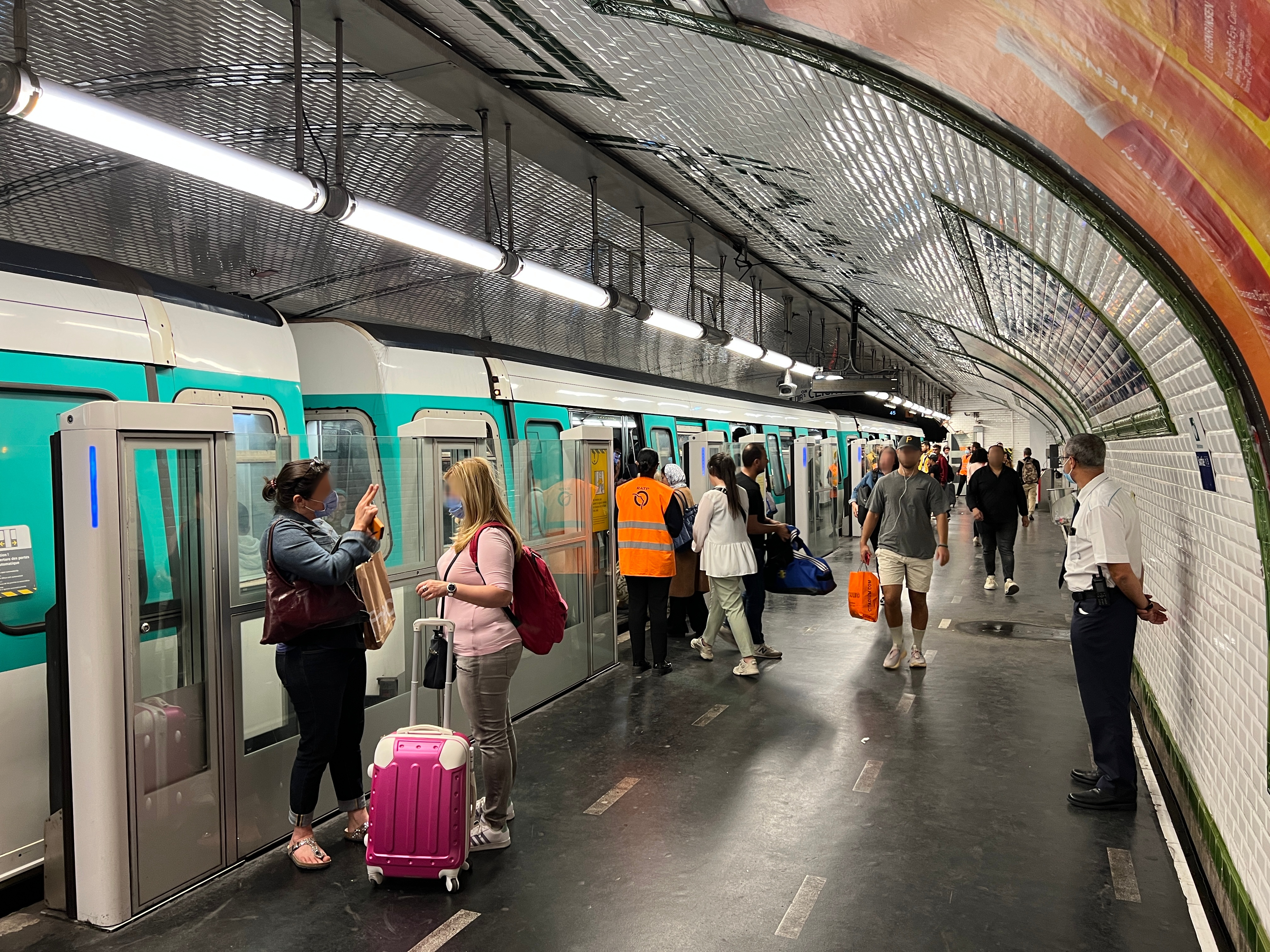

General information
- Location: 8th/9th/17th/18th arrondissement of Paris; Île-de-France; France
- Coordinates: 48°53′02″N 2°19′39″E
- Owner: RATP Group
- Operator: RATP Group
- Line: Line 2 Line 13
- Platforms: 2
- Tracks: 2

Other information
- Station code: 31-13
- Fare zone: 1

History
- Opened: 7 October 1902 (Line 2); 26 February 1911 (Line 13)

Services
Preceding station	Paris Metro	Following station
Rome towards Porte Dauphine	Line 2	Blanche towards Nation
Liège towards Châtillon–Montrouge	Line 13	La Fourche towards Les Courtilles or Saint-Denis–Université
Location
- Location within Paris

Place de Clichy (French pronunciation: [plas də kliʃi]) is a station of the Paris Métro, serving Paris Metro Line 2 and Line 13 at the junction of the 8th and 17th arrondissement of Paris.

== Location ==
The station is located under Place de Clichy, the platforms being situated:

- on line 2, northeast of the square and oriented northeast–southwest along the axis of the end of Boulevard de Clichy (between Rome and Blanche stations);
- on line 13, north of the square and approximately north–south, along the axis of the start of Avenue de Clichy (between La Fourche and Liège).

== History ==
The station was opened on 7 October 1902 as part of the extension of line 2 from Étoile to Anvers. The Place was named after the Barrière de Clichy, a gate built on the road to the village of Clichy for the collection of taxation as part of the Wall of the Farmers-General; the gate was built between 1784 and 1788 and demolished in the 19th century.

The line 13 platforms opened on 26 February 1911 as part of the Nord-Sud Company's line B from Saint-Lazare to Porte de Saint-Ouen. On 27 March 1931 line B became line 13 of the Métro following the absorption of the Nord-Sud Company on 1 January 1930 by its competing company, CMP. Like a third of the stations on the network between 1974 and 1984, the platforms on line 2 were modernized in Andreu-Motte style, in this case blue. In 1994, these platforms were restored with heritage green bordered tiled names on the platforms.

As part of the action plan voted on in 2010, to improve the regularity of line 13 that was chronically saturated, its platforms were equipped with platform doors from April to May 2012, as were eleven other stations on this line.

As part of the Un métro + beau program, the station is undergoing renovations from 22 January 2018 to 21 January 2020.

On 9 October 2019, half of the nameplates on the platforms of line 2 were temporarily replaced by the RATP in order to celebrate the 60th anniversary of Astérix and Obélix, as in eleven other stations. Taking up in particular the typography characteristic of the comics of René Goscinny and Albert Uderzo, Place de Clichy was humorously renamed PlaceDeClichix in reference to the names of the Gauls based on word games and ending with "-ix".

In 2019, 8,020,440 travelers entered this station which placed it in 28th position of metro stations for its usage.

== Passenger services ==
=== Access ===
The station has three entrances:

- access 1 - Place de Clichy, consisting of a fixed staircase, adorned with a Guimard entrance and decreed as a historic monuments on 12 February 2016, leading to the east of the square opposite no. 14, on the central reservation on Boulevard de Clichy;
- access 2 - Rue Biot, consisting of a fixed staircase lined with an ascending escalator and adorned with a balustrade in the characteristic Nord-Sud style, located north-west of the square to the right of the no. 7;
- access 3 - Rue Caulaincourt, consisting of a fixed staircase adorned with a kiosk designed by Hector Guimard in 1900 and classified as a historic monument, located on the central reservation of Boulevard de Clichy, opposite the Lycée Jules-Ferry at no. 77.

=== Station layout ===
G	Street Level	Exit/Entrance
B1	Mezzanine	Fare control, connection between platform
B2	Side platform, doors will open on the right
B2	Westbound	← toward Porte Dauphine (Rome)
B2	Eastbound	toward Nation (Blanche) →
B2	Side platform, doors will open on the right
B3	Side platform, doors will open on the right
B3	Northbound	← toward Les Courtilles or Saint-Denis–Université (La Fourche)
B3	Southbound	toward Châtillon–Montrouge (Liège) →
B3	Side platform, doors will open on the right

=== Platforms ===
The platforms of the two lines, 75 meters long, are of a standard configuration. Two in number per stopping point, they are separated by the metro tracks located in the centre and the vault is elliptical.

The station on line 2 is furnished in Andreu-Motte style with a blue light canopies, tunnel exits and corridor openings are in flat blue tiles with blue Motte style seats. These fittings are combined with the bevelled white ceramic tiles that cover the vault and the walls. The advertising frames are metallic, and the name of the station is written in capital letters or in the Parisine font on enamelled plates.

The station on line 13 has a semi-elliptical arch, a form specific to the old Nord-Sud stations. The tiles and ceramics are the original Nord-Sud decorative style with advertising frames and nameplates of the station are in a green colour, green geometric designs on the walls and the vault, the name inscribed in white earthenware on a blue background of small size above the advertising frames and very large between these frames, as well as the directions incorporated into the ceramic tile on the tympans. The bevelled white earthenware tiles cover the walls, the vault, and the tunnel exits. The lighting canopies are suspended and semi-independent tubes. The platforms are equipped with landing doors and have no seats due to the usual heavy crowds.

Furthermore, it is the only station on the network where music, in this case classical music, is broadcast, with no official reason for this exception.

=== Bus services ===
The station is served by lines 21, 30, 54, 68, 74, 80 and 95 of the RATP Bus Network and, at night, by lines N01, N02, N15 and N51 of the Noctilien network.

== Nearby ==
Nearby are the Montmartre Cemetery and the town hall of the 17th arrondissement as well as Monument au maréchal Moncey, in the Place de Clichy

== Gallery ==
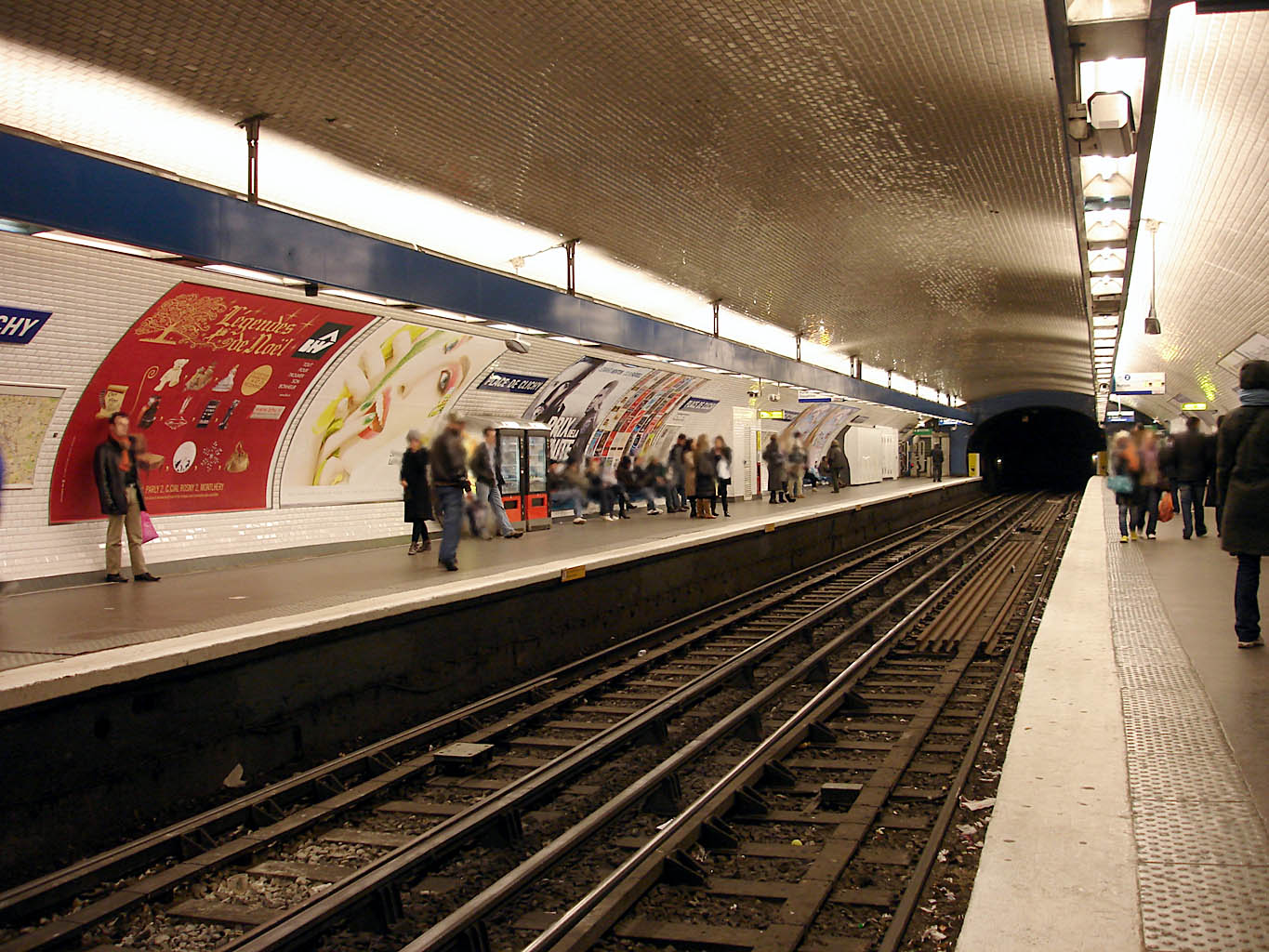
Line 2

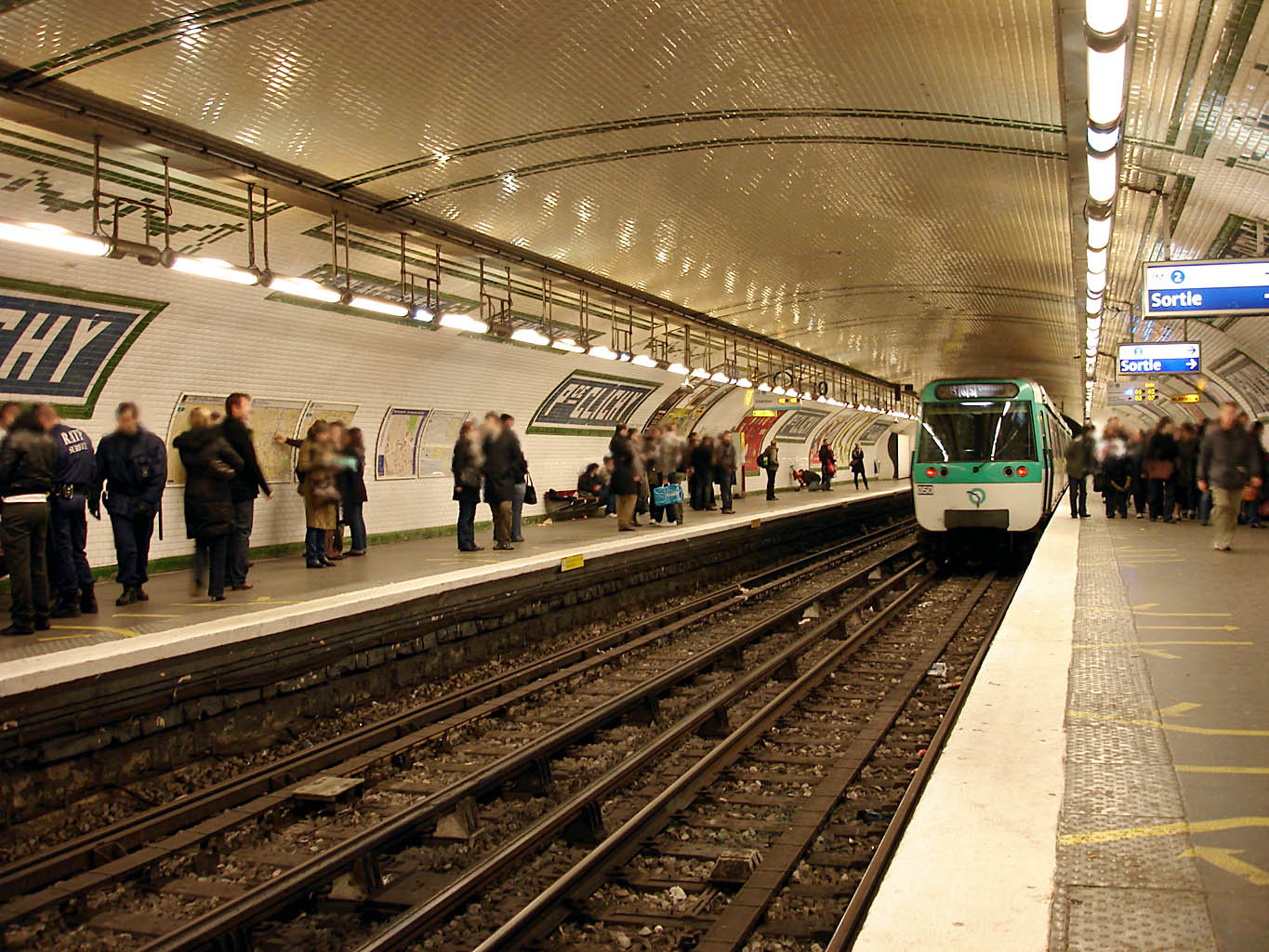
Line 13
