= Blanche station =

Metro station in Paris, France

Blanche
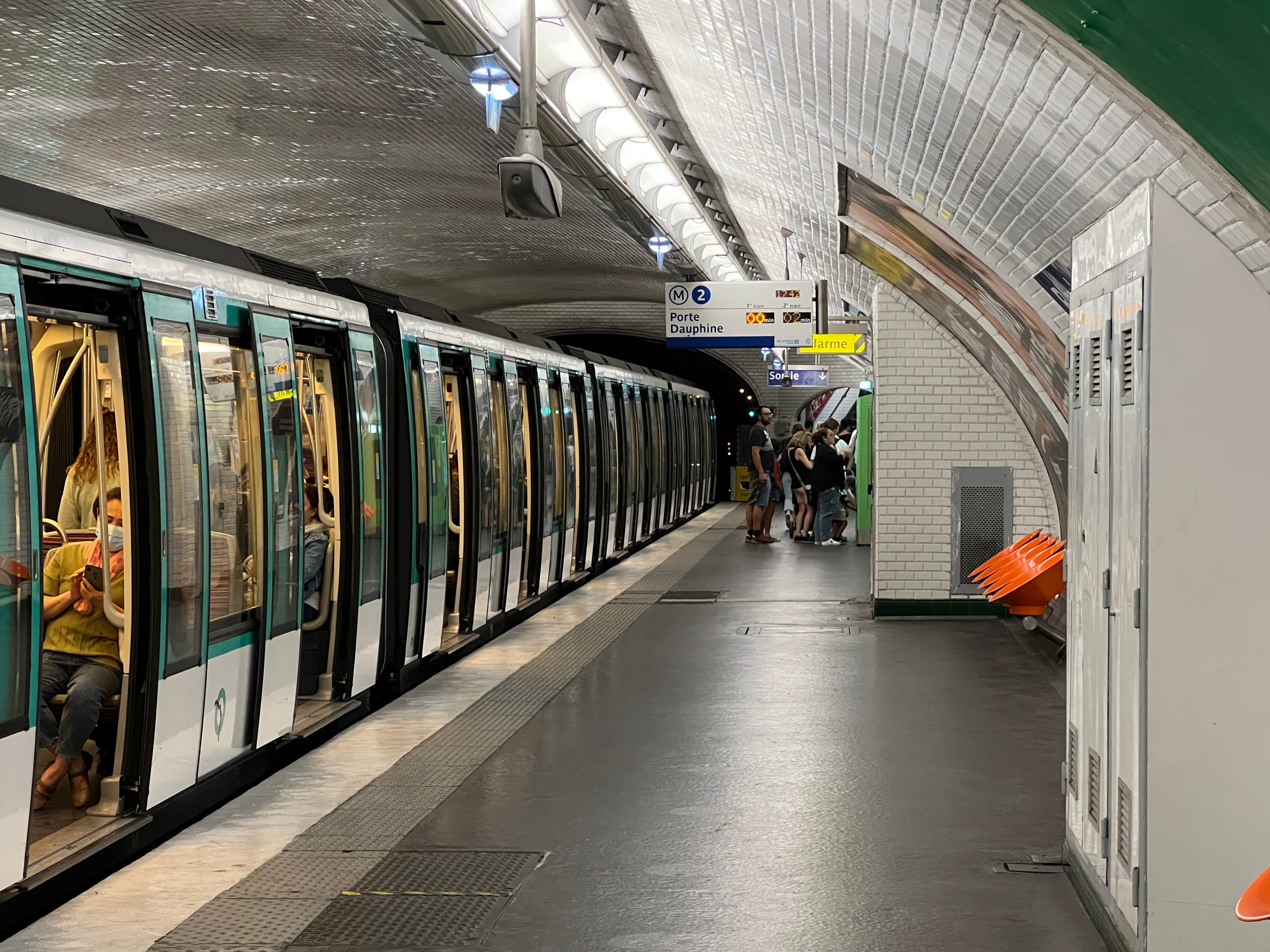

General information
- Location: 59, boul. de Clichy; 9th arrondissement of Paris; Île-de-France; France
- Coordinates: 48°53′00″N 2°20′01″E
- Owner: RATP
- Operator: RATP

Other information
- Fare zone: 1

History
- Opened: 21 October 1902

Services
| Preceding station | Paris Metro | Following station |
|---|---|---|
| Place de Clichy towards Porte Dauphine | Line 2 | Pigalle towards Nation |
Location
- Location within Paris

Blanche (French pronunciation: [blɑ̃ʃ]) is a station on Paris Métro Line 2, on the border of the 9th and the 18th arrondissements.

== Location ==
The station is located under Boulevard de Clichy in Montmartre, east of Place Blanche. Oriented approximately along an east–west axis, it is located between the Place de Clichy and Pigalle metro stations.

== History ==
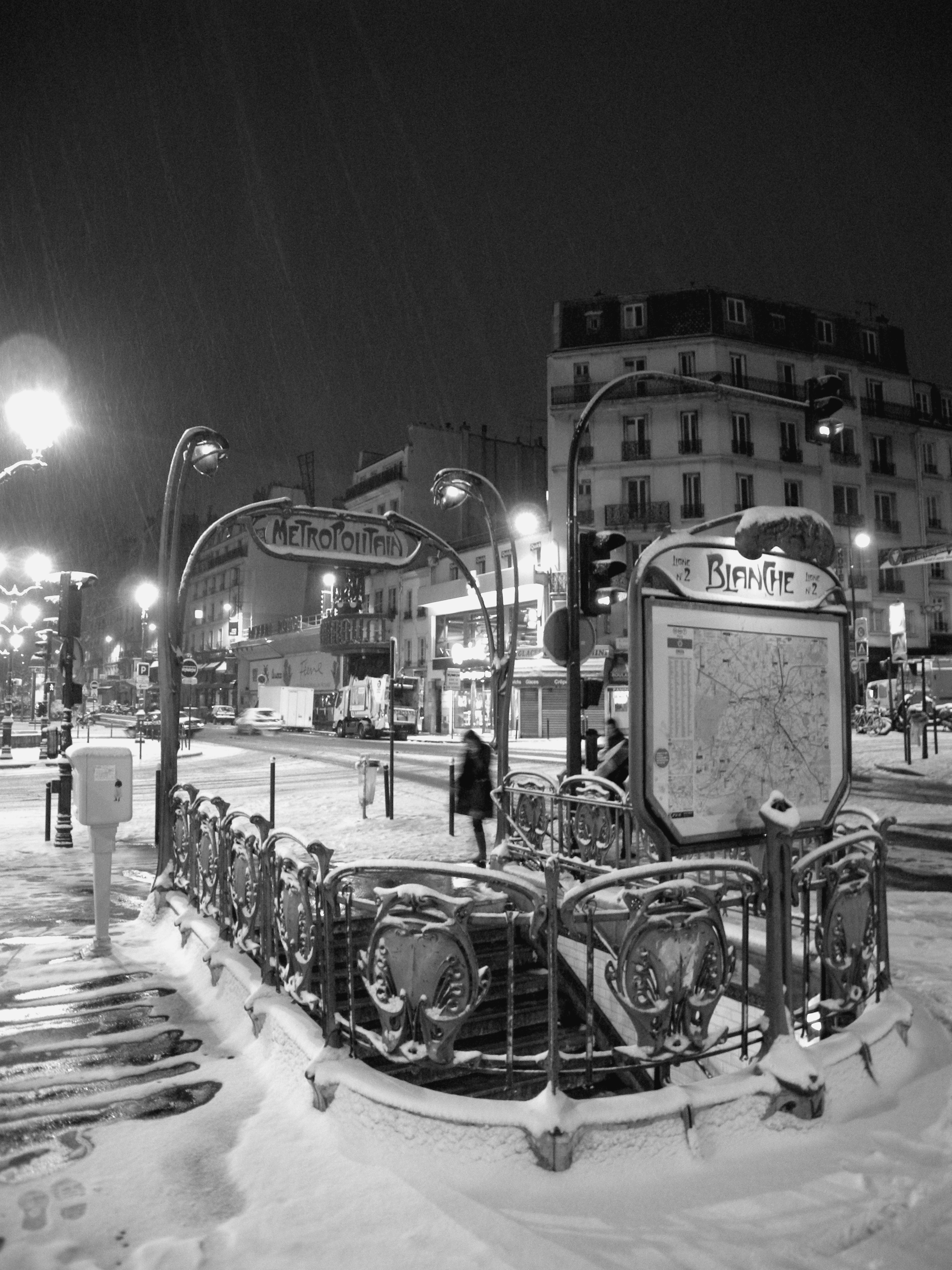
Station entrance

The station was opened on 21 October 1902 as part of the extension of line 2 Nord from Étoile to Anvers and simply as line 2 from 17 October 1907. The station was not ready for the opening of the line two weeks earlier, so trains passed without stopping. The station is named after the Place Blanche (French for "white place"), which derives its name from the gypsum that spilled in the 17th century from the wagons leaving the Montmartre quarries, where it was mined to produce plaster of Paris. The Place was named after the Barrière Blanche, a gate built for the collection of taxation as part of the Wall of the Farmers-General; the gate was built between 1784 and 1788 and demolished in the 19th century.

From the 1950s until 2010, the walls were covered with a metallic bodywork with blue horizontal pillars and illuminated golden advertising frames. Its removal was part of the RATP's Renouveau du métro renovation program, and was completed with 'shell' white seats characteristic of the Motte style.

In 2019, 3,893,362 travelers entered this station which placed it at the 122nd position of the metro stations for its usage.

== Passenger services ==
=== Access ===
The station has a single access entitled Boulevard de Clichy, leading to the central reservation of this boulevard, facing no. 59. Consisting of a fixed staircase, it is adorned with a Guimard entrance, whose remaining elements are subject to a registration as historic monuments by a decree of 29 May 1978.

=== Station layout ===
G Street Level
| M | Mezzanine for platform connection |
| P Platform level | Side platform, doors will open on the right |
| P Platform level | Platform 1 | ← toward Porte Dauphine (Place de Clichy) |
| P Platform level | Platform 2 | toward Nation (Pigalle) → |
| P Platform level | Side platform, doors will open on the right |

=== Platforms ===
Blanche is a standard configuration station. It has two platforms separated by the metro tracks and the vault is elliptical. The decoration is of the style used for most metro stations. The lighting canopies are white and rounded in the Gaudin style of the renouveau du métro des années 2000, and the bevelled white ceramic tiles cover the walls, the vault, and the tunnel exit. The advertising frames are in white ceramic and the name of the station is written in Parisine font on enamelled plates. The seats are in orange Akiko style.

=== Bus services ===
The station is served by lines 30, 54, 68, 74 and the tourist line Tootbus Paris of the RATP Bus Network and, at night, N01 and N02 of the Noctilien network.

== Nearby ==
The station serves the Moulin Rouge.
