= Place de Clichy =

Square in Paris, France

- Location within Paris
- Length: 60 m (200 ft)
- Width: 60 m (200 ft)
- Arrondissement: 8th, 9th, 17th, 18th
- Quarter: Europe, Saint-Georges, Batignolles, Grandes Carrières
- Coordinates: 48°53′01″N 2°19′39″E

Construction
- Completion: Ord. of the Bureau des Finances on 16 January 1789
- Denomination: Arr. on 30 December 1864

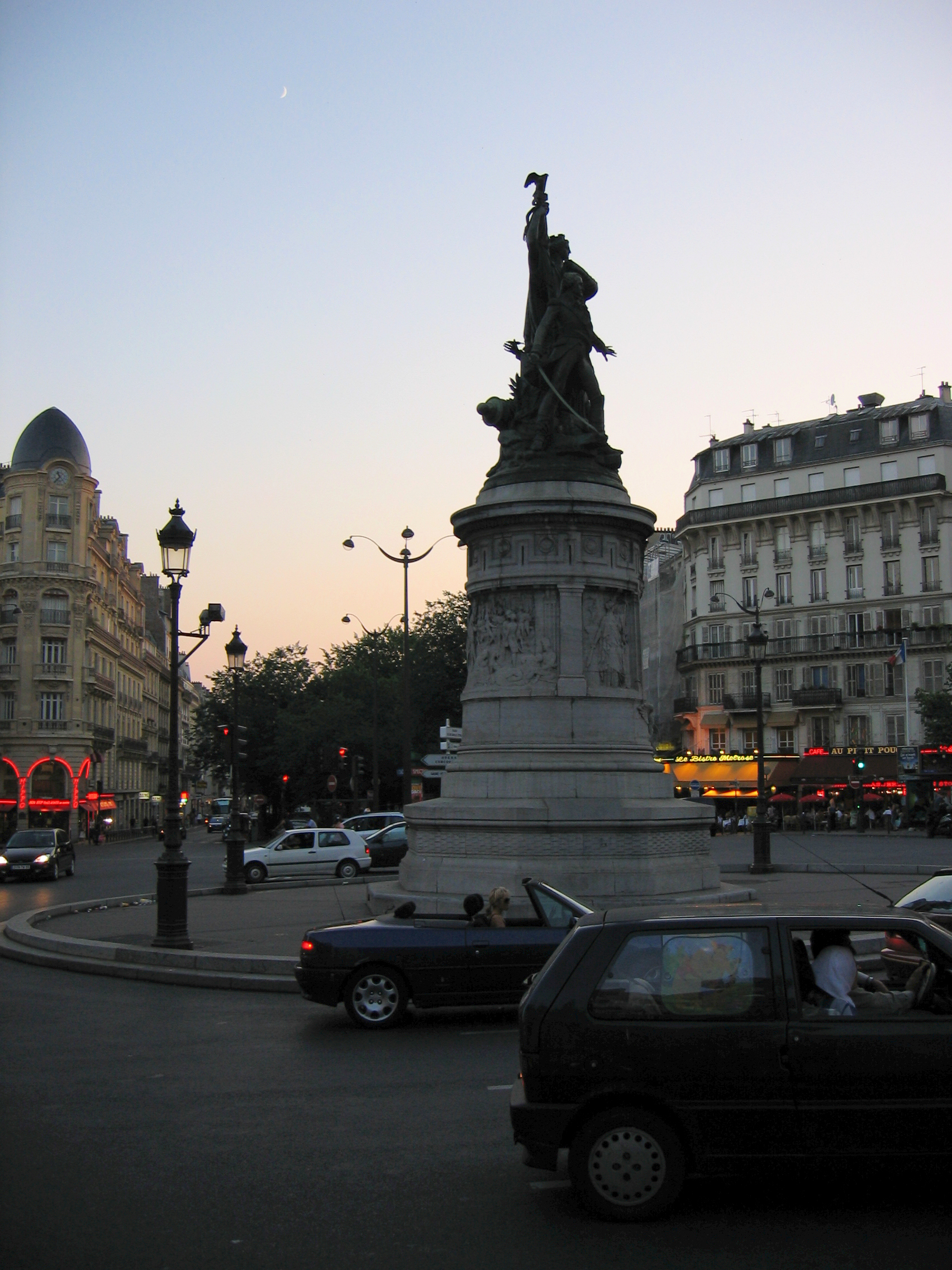
Nightfall in the Place de Clichy

The Place de Clichy (French pronunciation: [plas də kliʃi]), also known as the Place Clichy, is a city square situated in the northwestern quadrant of Paris. It is formed by the intersection of the Boulevard de Clichy, the Avenue de Clichy, the Rue de Clichy, the Boulevard des Batignolles, and the Rue d'Amsterdam.

It lies at the former site of the barrière de Clichy, an ancient portal in the Wall of the Farmers-General, leading to the village of Clichy, outside the wall.

== Description ==
The Place de Clichy is one of the few places in Paris where four arrondissements (the 8th, 9th, 17th, and 18th) meet at a single point. (The others are the Pont Saint-Michel, where the 1st, 4th, 5th, and 6th meet, and the Belleville roundabout, where the 10th, 11th, 19th and 20th come together.)

The Place de Clichy is also unusual in that it has been untouched by urban planners. This explains the heterogeneous façades of the buildings in the area. The Place de Clichy has the character of a substantial crossroads, rather than that of a real place (public square).

Surrounding the Place de Clichy is a lively array of shops, restaurants, and businesses, including a popular cinema. It is a hive of activity, both day and night.

== History ==
In March 1814, at the close of the First French Empire, 800,000 soldiers of various foreign armies marched on Paris. After breaking through the barriers at Belleville and Pantin, they took the hill of Montmartre. Paris was protected in the north from Clichy to Neuilly, by 70,000 men of the garde nationale. In the face of the advancing enemy, Marshal Bon-Adrien Jeannot de Moncey defended the barrière de Clichy. Moncey amassed 15,000 volunteers, tirailleurs – students from the École polytechnique and the École vétérinaire – and, despite their inexperience, valiantly resisted the Russian contingent until an armistice was declared on 30 March 1814.

== Monument ==
A six-metre-tall bronze statue (Monument to Marshal Moncey), made by Amédée Donatien Doublemard and dedicated to Moncey, stands on an ornate pedestal eight metres tall.

== Metro station ==
Served by the Place de Clichy Métro station, the area is accessible by lines 2 and 13.

== See also ==
- Régie Autonome des Transports Parisiens (RATP/Autonomous Operator of Parisian Transports)
- Tramways in Paris
