= Liège station (Paris Metro) =

Metro station in Paris, France

Liège
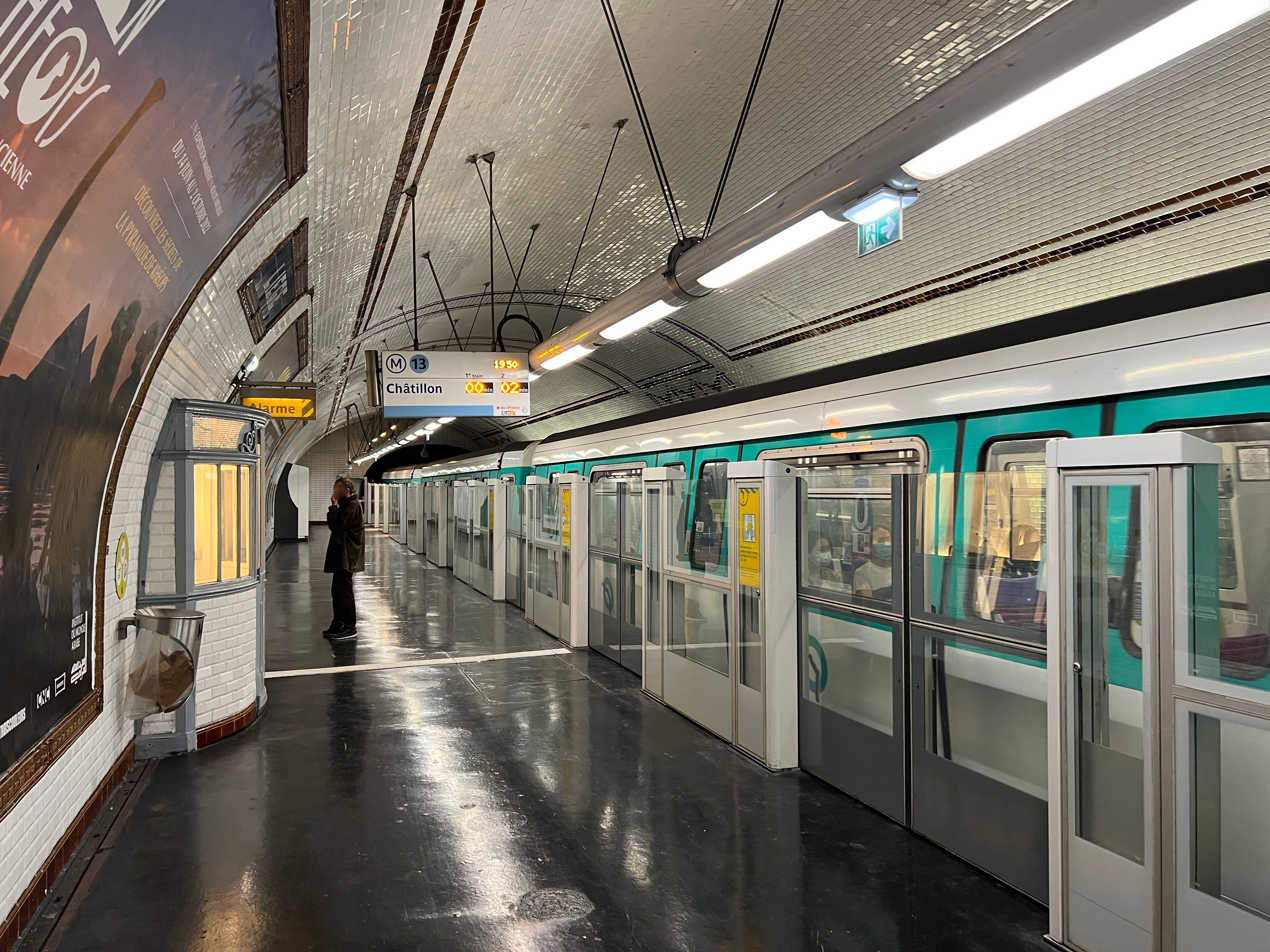
- Station view

General information
- Location: 8th arrondissement of Paris; Île-de-France; France
- Coordinates: 48°52′47″N 2°19′37″E
- System: Paris Métro station
- Owner: RATP
- Operator: RATP

Other information
- Fare zone: 1

History
- Opened: 26 February 1911

Services
Preceding station	Paris Metro	Following station
Saint-Lazare towards Châtillon–Montrouge	Line 13	Place de Clichy towards Les Courtilles or Saint-Denis–Université
Location
- Location within Paris

Liège (French pronunciation: [ljɛʒ]) is a station on Line 13 of the Paris Métro. Opened in 1911, it is located the border of the 8th and 9th arrondissements.

== History ==
It was built as part of the Nord-Sud Company's Line B from Saint-Lazare to Porte de Saint-Ouen and opened on 26 February 1911 as Berlin, named after the nearby Rue Berlin. As the Rue d'Amsterdam, which the line runs under at this point, is too narrow to accommodate platforms across from each other, the station was built with offset platforms. It was closed on 1 August 1914 at the beginning of World War I. It reopened on 1 December 1914, when it and the street it was named after had been renamed after the Belgian city of Liège, paying homage to the Belgian resistance during the Battle of Liège. On 27 March 1931 the Nord-Sud Company was taken over by the Compagnie du chemin de fer métropolitain de Paris and line B became line 13 of the Métro.

The station was closed at the beginning of World War II, when many stations were closed for economic reasons. Unlike all but eight of the closed stations, its reopening was significantly delayed, in this case until 1968. Even then its opening hours were limited, being closed on Sunday and closing at 8pm on the other days, with all trains running through without stopping. Although Rennes station, which also reopened in 1968 began to operate normal opening hours in 2004, the authorities refused to agree to Liège working normal hours. Changing lifestyles and increasing redevelopment of the area, with residences replacing offices, inspired a sustained political campaign. Eventually it was agreed to operate normal hours from 4 December 2006.

In 1982, Liège was refurbished with new ceramic decorations made in Welkenraedt, Belgium, which evoke the landscapes and monuments of the Province of Liège. It had further renovation work in December 2006.

== Passenger services ==
=== Access ===
The station has only one entrance, a staircase on the median strip opposite no. 21, Rue de Liège.

=== Station layout ===
G	Street Level	Exit/Entrance
B1	Side platform, doors will open on the right
B1	Northbound	← toward Les Courtilles or Saint-Denis–Université (Place de Clichy)
B1	Southbound	toward Châtillon–Montrouge (Saint-Lazare) →
B1	Side platform, doors will open on the right

- Note: The side platforms are offset.

=== Platforms ===
Its geographical location explains one of its peculiarities. It has two platforms that do not face each other. The Rue d'Amsterdam, being too narrow to accommodate the traditional station on network, the trains stop at the first half-station encountered. The Commerce metro station, on line 8, is the only other station in the capital built as this model for the same reasons, the trains stopping there on in the second half-station encountered.

The station was originally decorated, like all the non-connecting stations of the Société du Chemin de Fer Électrique Nord-Sud de Paris, simply known as the 'North-South', with its name advertised on vast mosaics and friezes of brown ceramic bearing the initials 'NS'. This decoration was supplemented with a new one based on the framework of cultural exchanges between France and Belgium in 1982. This is based on ceramics made from photos of Welkenraedt and installed in the advertising frames of the right wall facing the single platforms of each half-station. It evokes landscapes and monuments of the province of Liège. This modification also saw the installation of new tiles on the entrance tunnels of each platform, with the coat of arms of the city of Liège on one of the two entrances. The ceramics on the two platforms are the work of two scenographers from Liège, Marie-Claire Van Vuchelen for the southern direction and Daniel Hicter for the northern direction. The eighteen frescoes, nine in each direction, are painted in color in northern direction and blue duotone in the southern direction.

=== Bus connections ===
The station is served by lines 21 and 68 of the RATP Bus Network and the Noctilien line N01.

== Gallery ==
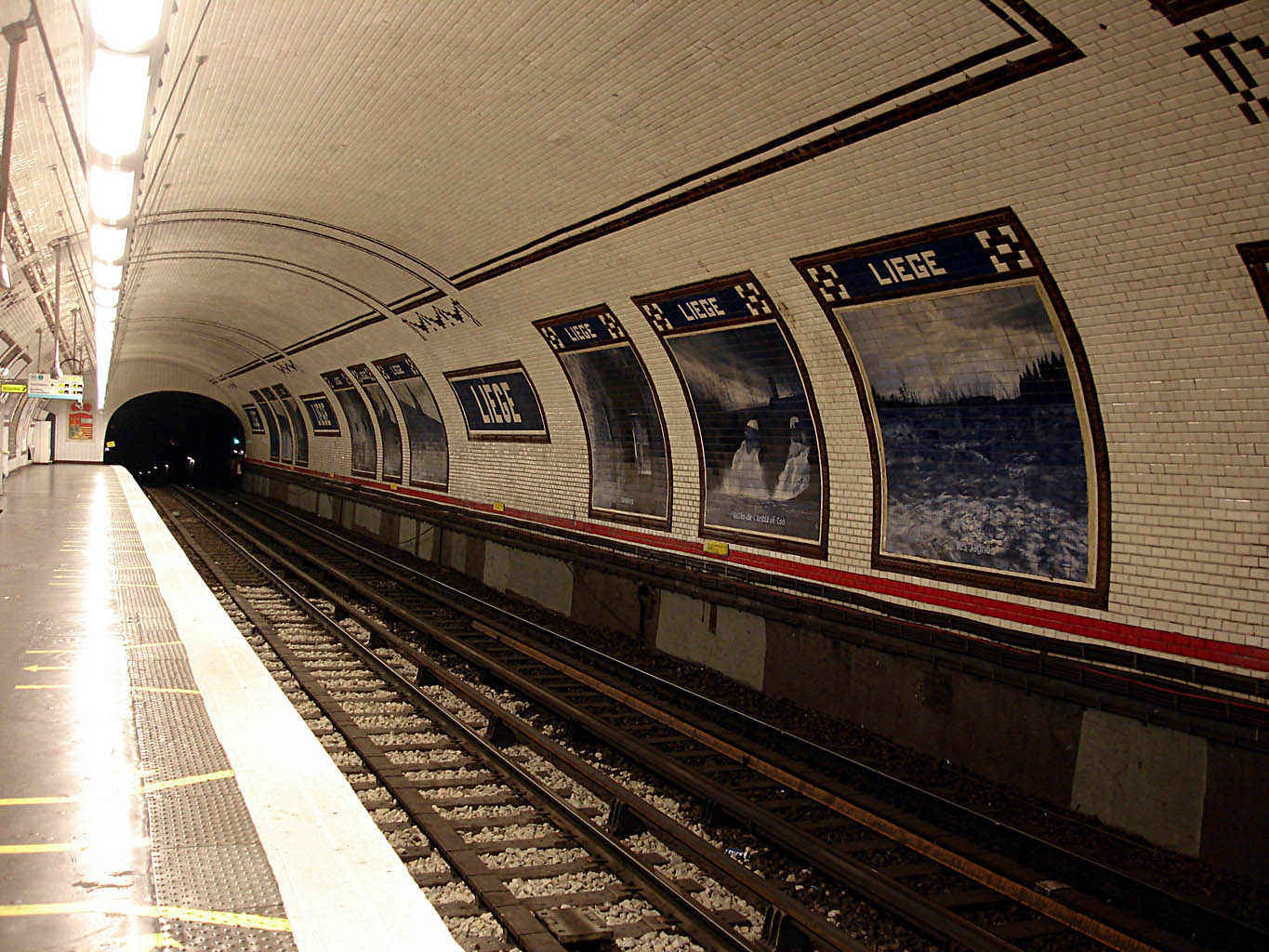
Line 13 platform at Liège

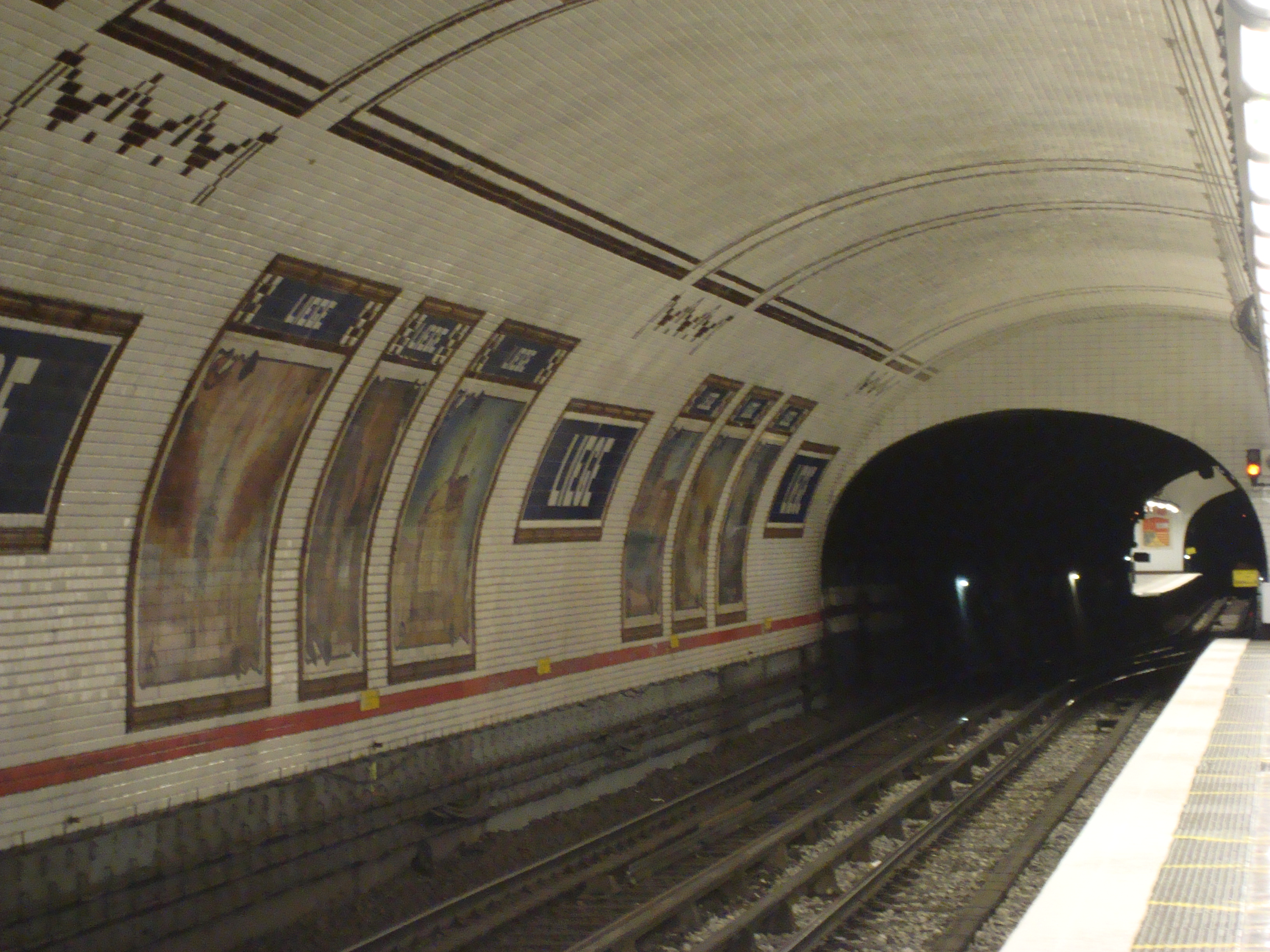
The opposite platform can be seen through the tunnel
