= Gare de Lyon (Paris Metro) =

Metro station in Paris, France

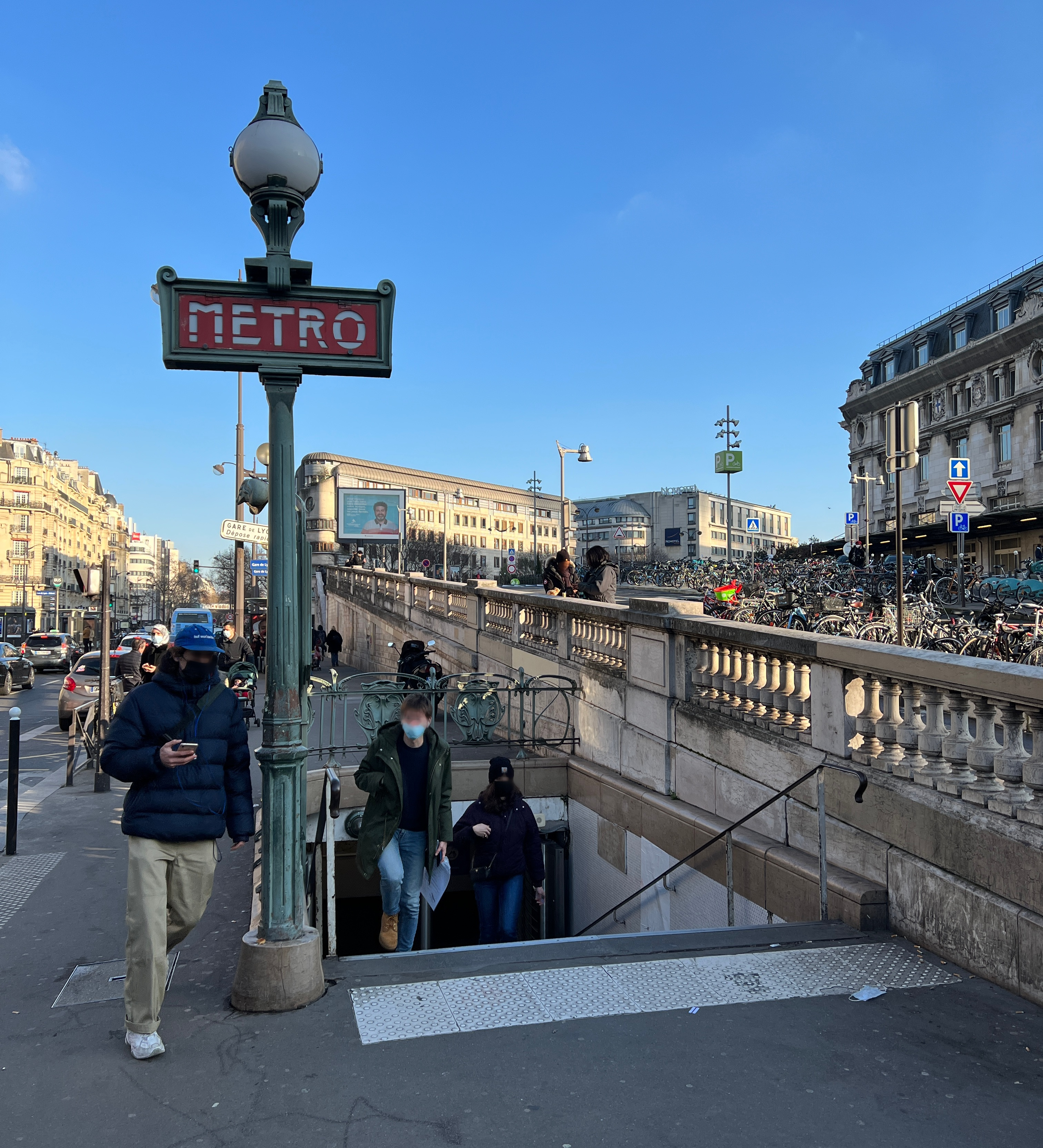
- Boulevard Diderot entrance in December 2021

General information
- Location: 20 bis, 25, 27, 28, Boul. Diderot; 167, 175, 191, 201, 203, Rue de Bercy; Gare de Lyon (three); 12th arrondissement of Paris; Île-de-France; France
- Coordinates: 48°50′41″N 2°22′26″E
- Owner: RATP
- Connections: at Gare de Lyon

Construction
- Accessible: Line 1: At least one escalator or lift in the station between the street and the platform; Line 14: Yes

Other information
- Fare zone: 1

History
- Opened: 19 July 1900 (Line 1); 15 October 1998 (Line 14)

Passengers
- 2021: 28,640,475

Services
Preceding station	Paris Metro	Following station
Bastille towards La Défense	Line 1	Reuilly–Diderot towards Château de Vincennes
Châtelet towards Saint-Denis–Pleyel	Line 14	Bercy towards Aéroport d'Orly
Connections to other stations
Preceding station	RER	Following station
Châtelet–Les Halles towards Saint-Germain-en-Laye, Cergy-le-Haut or Poissy	RER A	Nation towards Boissy-Saint-Léger or Marne-la-Vallée–Chessy
Châtelet-Les Halles towards Creil	RER D transfer at Gare de Lyon	Maisons-Alfort–Alfortville towards Corbeil-Essonnes
Châtelet-Les Halles towards Goussainville	RER D transfer at Gare de Lyon	Maisons-Alfort–Alfortville towards Melun
Châtelet-Les Halles towards Villiers-le-Bel–Gonesse–Arnouville	RER D transfer at Gare de Lyon	Maisons-Alfort–Alfortville towards Melun
Route map
Line 1
Line 14
Location
- Location within Paris

Gare de Lyon (French pronunciation: [ɡaʁ də ljɔ̃]) is a station on lines 1 and 14 of the Paris Métro. It is connected to the Gare de Lyon mainline rail and RER platforms within one complex and is the third-busiest station on the Metro system with 28.6 million entering passengers in 2021.

== History ==
=== Line 1 ===
Gare de Lyon was one of the eight (out of 18) stations ready for use when Paris’ Metro service was initiated between Porte de Vincennes and Porte Maillot on 19 July 1900. The original network schema called for a Line 2 circling the central city that would cross the Seine from the Left Bank, merge with Line 1 at Gare de Lyon, and share its track and platforms to Place de la Nation. The station was therefore built wider and longer than the then-standard. It was 100 meters long rather than 75, and over 20 meters wide rather than 13.5. It had four tracks flanking two 6-meter-wide platforms, with the two Line 1 tracks between the platforms, and the future Line 2 tracks divided along each of the outer sides. Like most Line 1 stations, it was excavated using cut and cover. Along the center of each of the platforms was a row of iron pillars supporting the 23.9-meter-wide metal deck, which carries the heavily-used Boulevard Diderot above the length of the station. Excavation of this section of Line 1 was finished by November 1899, but interruptions in iron deliveries delayed completion of the deck until May 1900.

In 1901 the track-sharing plan was abandoned and a different route mapped for Line 2. Because Line 2 was partly intended to provide passenger connections between Paris’ mainline railway terminals, planners then looked to the future north-south Line 5, which would have stations at several terminals and Gare de Lyon accessible via transfer to Line 1 at nearby Bastille. When Line 5 was built adjacent to the right bank of the Seine in 1905-06, the unused fork at Gare de Lyon was used as part of a maintenance track between the two lines. Using that connection and its southern platform, Gare de Lyon served as Line 5’s temporary northern terminus when service was extended from the Left Bank over the Seine in July 1906. The service was discontinued in December when Line 5 was extended from Quai de la Rapée to Bastille and Lancry (Jacques Bonsergent). The southern platform was subsequently fenced off from the adjacent service track. The northern trackbed was filled in and the platform widened over it.

In the Lyon-Rapée service tunnel was later built a short platform on whose eastern side ran the Voie des Finances, a narrow-gauge (60 cm), single-track railway to the cellars of the Metro administrative building on the Quai de la Rapée. During the metro’s nighttime closures from 1937 to 1967, end-of-day cash receipts were collected and the next day’s tickets distributed by an armored train along a Quai de la Rapée-Place d'Italie-Étoile-Gare de Lyon circuit. At the shared platform in the service tunnel, the cash and tickets were exchanged with the small-gauge train that shuttled to the Metro’s safes. The trains and the Voie were the focus of Alex Joffé’s 1965 heist comedy, La Grosse Caisse (The Big Swag). The film used location footage of the metro and the Place Mazas area, but the dialogue scenes in the Quai de la Rapée station and in the service tunnel were shot on studio sets.

As part of the automation of line 1, the station's platforms were raised during the weekend of 18 and 19 July 2009 in order to receive platform screen doors. The latter were installed in November 2010. Since December 2012, it has become, with the automation of line 1, the only transfer station served by metro lines that are all automatic.

=== Line 14 ===
Tropical garden on Line 14
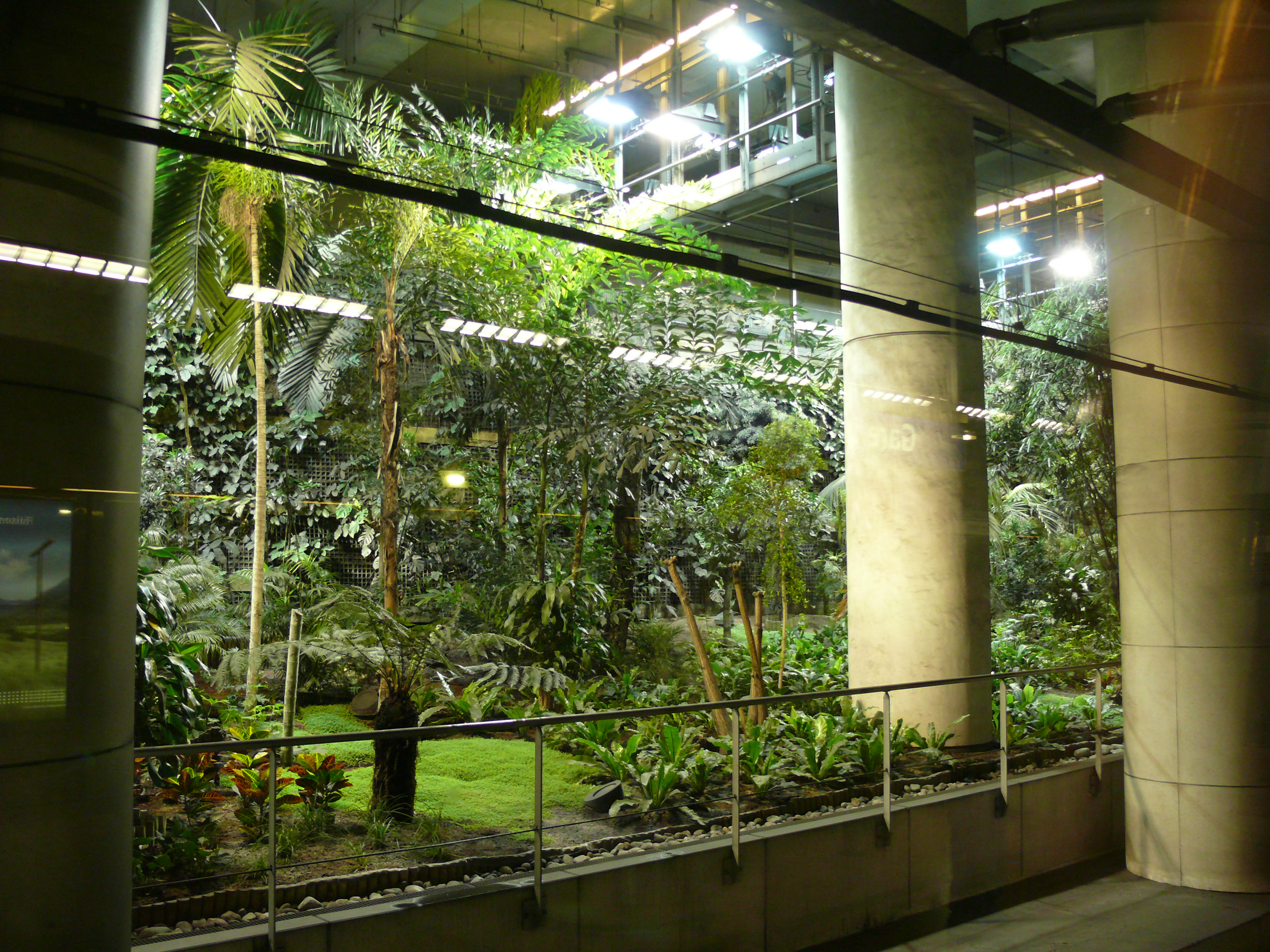
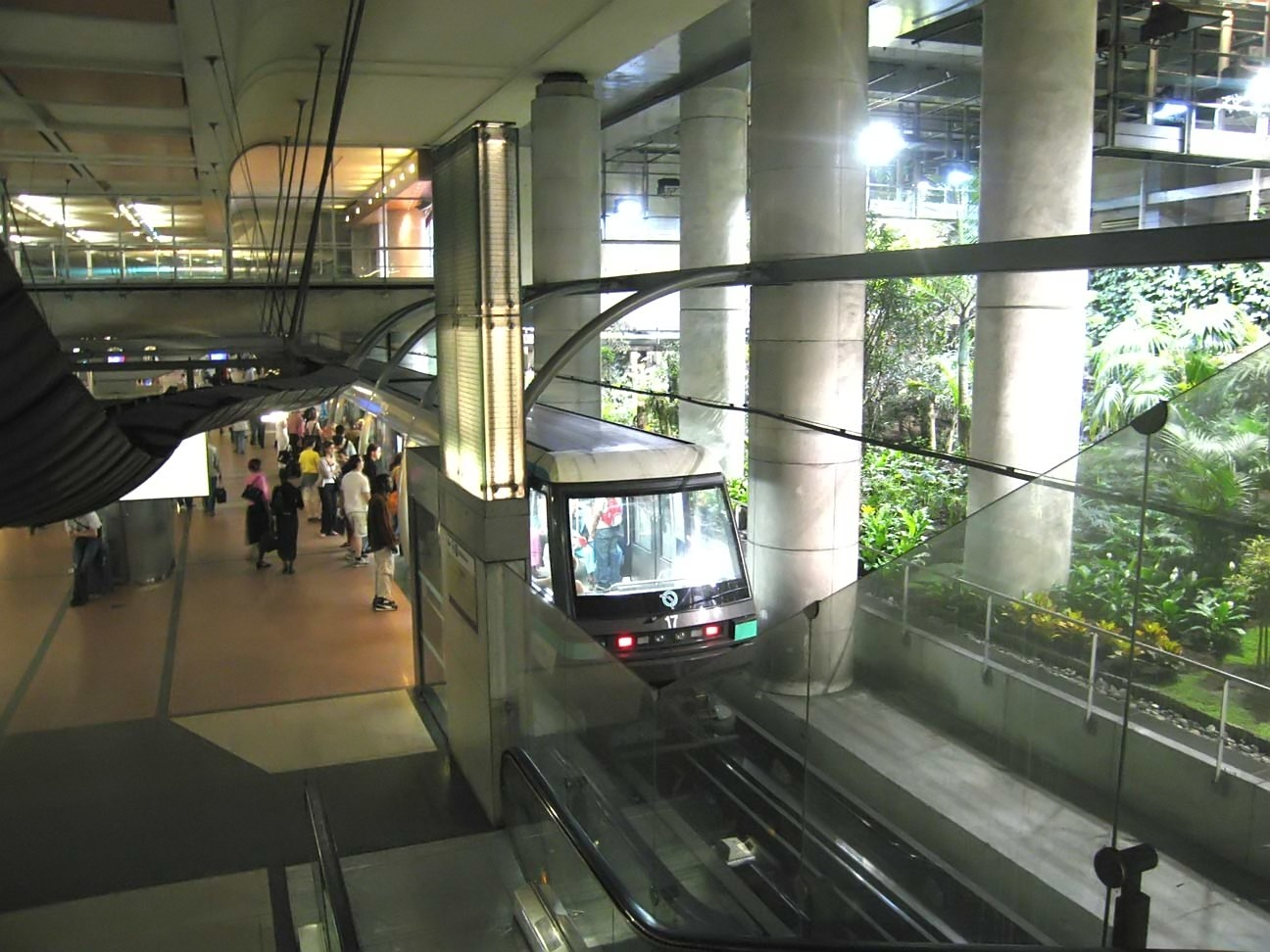

The station of Line 14 was opened on 15 October 1998. It is located south of the Gare de Lyon in the Rue de Bercy, next to the stations of RER lines A and D. It has two lines on either side of a large central platform. Between the eastbound lane from Olympiades and the RATP headquarters is an exotic garden.

The STIF board of directors decided on 27 May 2009 to provide funding in 2010 for a third access in the middle of the platform to facilitate movement within the busy and relatively narrow station. This new access will join the existing bridge over the tracks, which currently provides access to the RER, but is not used to access Line 14. This would separate the flow of arriving and departing passengers.

== Passenger services ==
=== Access ===
The station has twelve entrances:

- Access no. 1 "Boulevard Diderot": staircase leading to 26 bis, boulevard Diderot;
- Access n° 2 "Ministry of the Economy and Finance";
- Access no. 3 "Rue Michel Chasles";
- Access no. 4 "Cour de Chalon";
- Access no. 6 "Cour de l'Horloge";
- Access n° 7 "Rue de Bercy": allows a connection by foot with the Gare de Paris Bercy;
- Access no. 9 "Place Henri-Frenay";
- Access no. 10 "Rue Legraverend": staircase leading to 25, boulevard Diderot;
- Access no. 11 "Rue de Châlon";
- Access no. 12 "Rue Villiot";
- Access no. 13 "Rue Van Gogh": 1 escalator going up to 203, rue de Bercy and 1 going down facing no. 205. This access allows you to connect on with the Gare d'Austerlitz train station by foot;
- Access no. 15 "Maison de la RATP": staircase leading to 167, rue de Bercy.

=== Station layout ===
G	Street Level	Exit/Entrance
B1	Mezzanine	to Exits/Entrances
B2	Side platform with PSDs, doors will open on the right
B2	Westbound	← toward La Défense (Bastille)
B2	Eastbound	toward Château de Vincennes (Reuilly–Diderot) →
B2	Side platform with PSDs, doors will open on the right
B3
B3	Northbound	← toward Saint-Denis–Pleyel (Châtelet)
B3	Island platform with PSDs, doors will open on the left
B3	Southbound	toward Aéroport d'Orly (Bercy) →

=== Platforms ===
The platforms of line 1, built in the open air, are covered with a 23.90-metre-wide metal deck, which supports the carriageway. At its eastern end, a short central wall separates the two main rails. The one further north has now been removed, which has allowed the platform to be widened towards La Défense, and the track to the south used to connect lines 1 and 5 is insulated behind glass walls. The transition between the tyre running track of line 1 and the rail running track of line 5 is made within the station itself; it is thus visible to the public.

The station on line 14 has two tracks on either side of a central platform, due to a lack of space available to build a station with a conventional layout. Between the track towards Orly Airport and the Maison de la RATP is an exotic garden that embellishes the platform. Originally, the location of the garden was reserved for access to the Museum of Transport (not realized).

=== Other connections ===
The station serves the Gare de Lyon, the origin of trains and TGVs, mainly to the south-east of France. It is thus in correspondence with line A and line D of the RER.

It is served by lines 24, 29, 57, 61, 63, 72, 77, 87 and 91 of the RATP bus network. Finally, at night, it is served by lines N01, N02, N11, N16, N31, N32, N33, N34, N35, N130, N131, N132, N133, N134, N137 and N139 of the Noctilien bus network.

The Gare d'Austerlitz is accessible on foot by taking, to the south-west of the Gare de Lyon, the rue Van-Gogh, then the Charles-de-Gaulle bridge, which allows you to reach the RER C and lines 5 and 10 of the metro.

== Gallery ==
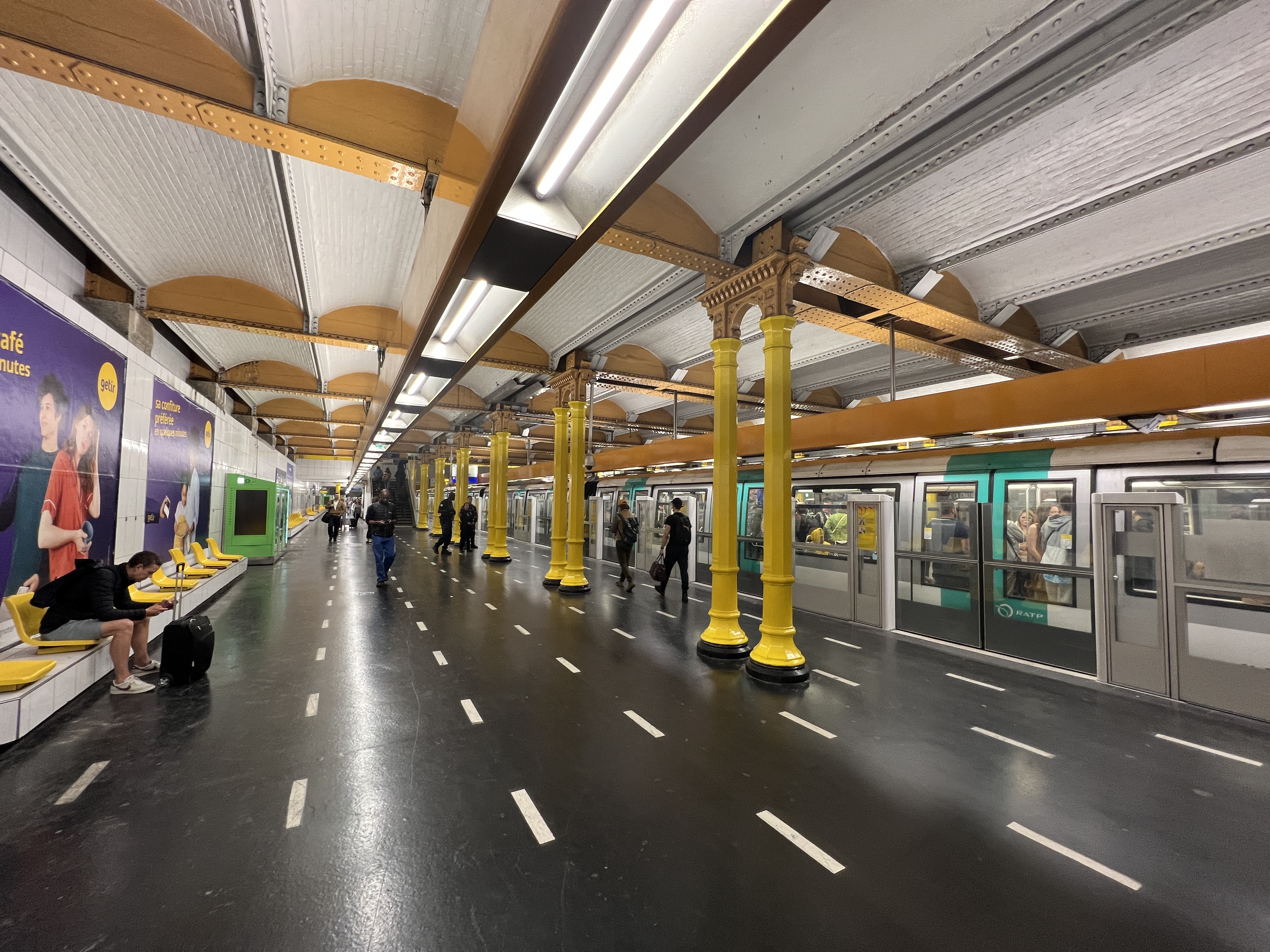
Line 1 platforms

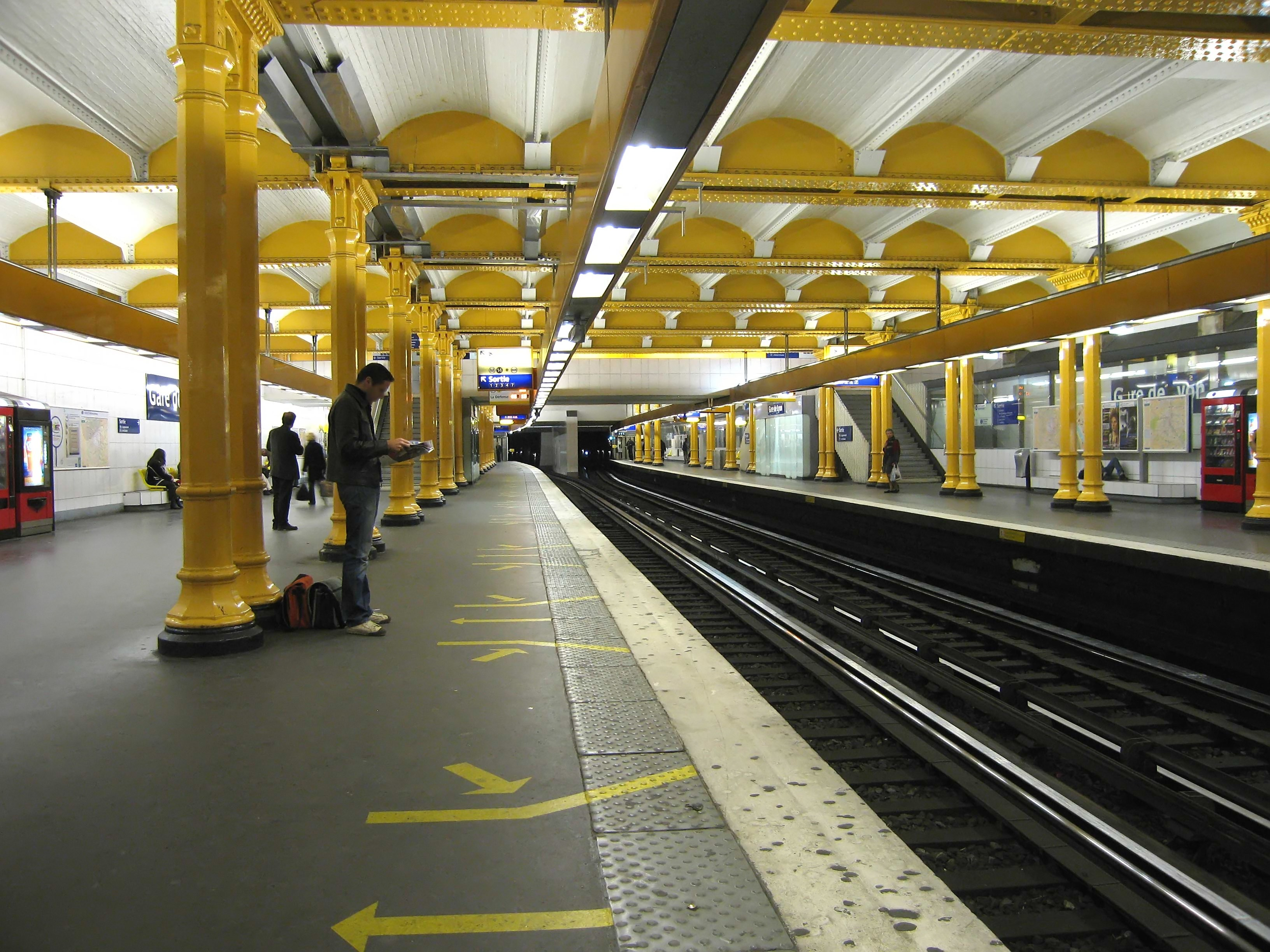
Line 1 platforms before the installation of platform screen doors

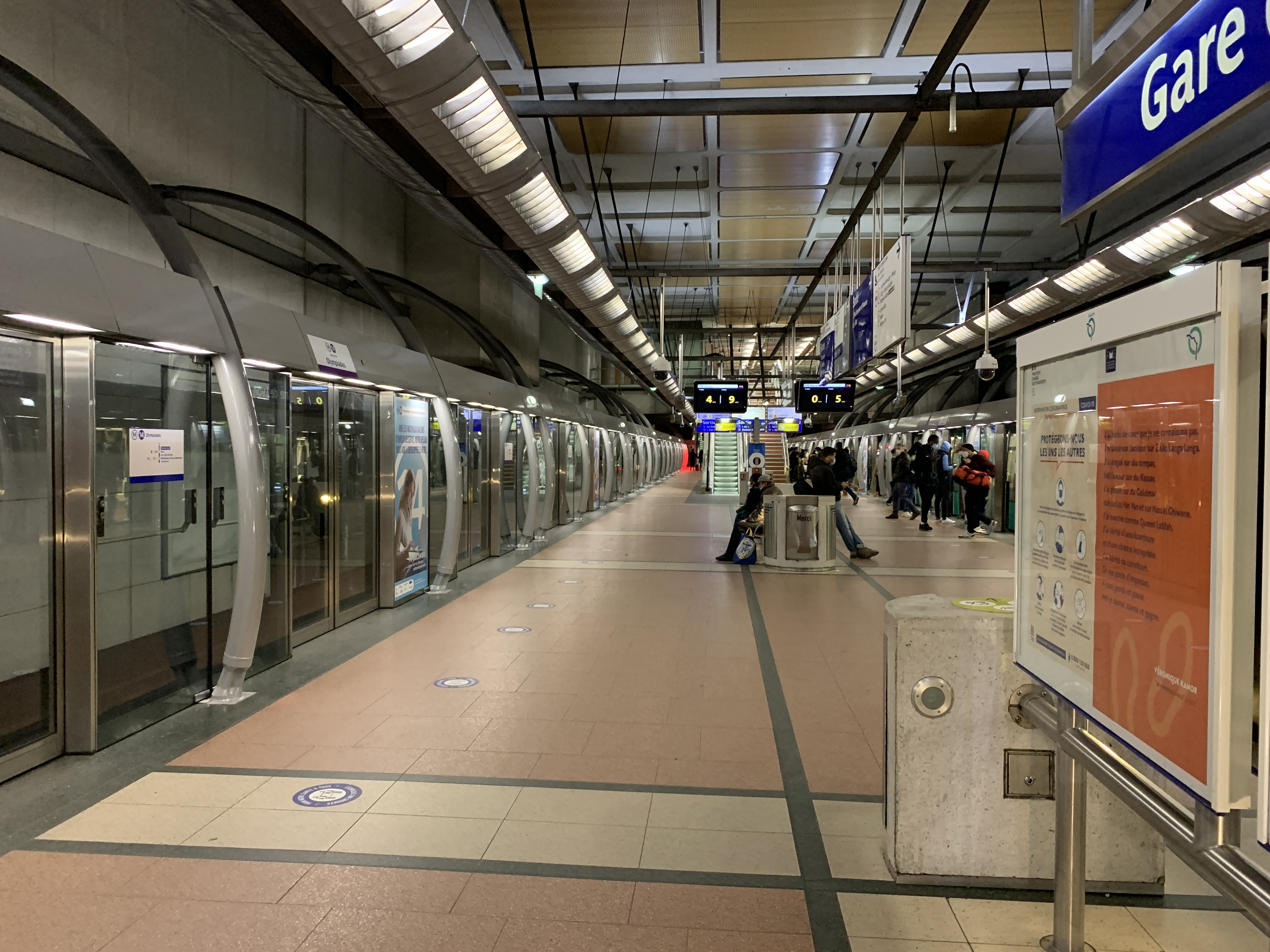
Line 14 platforms

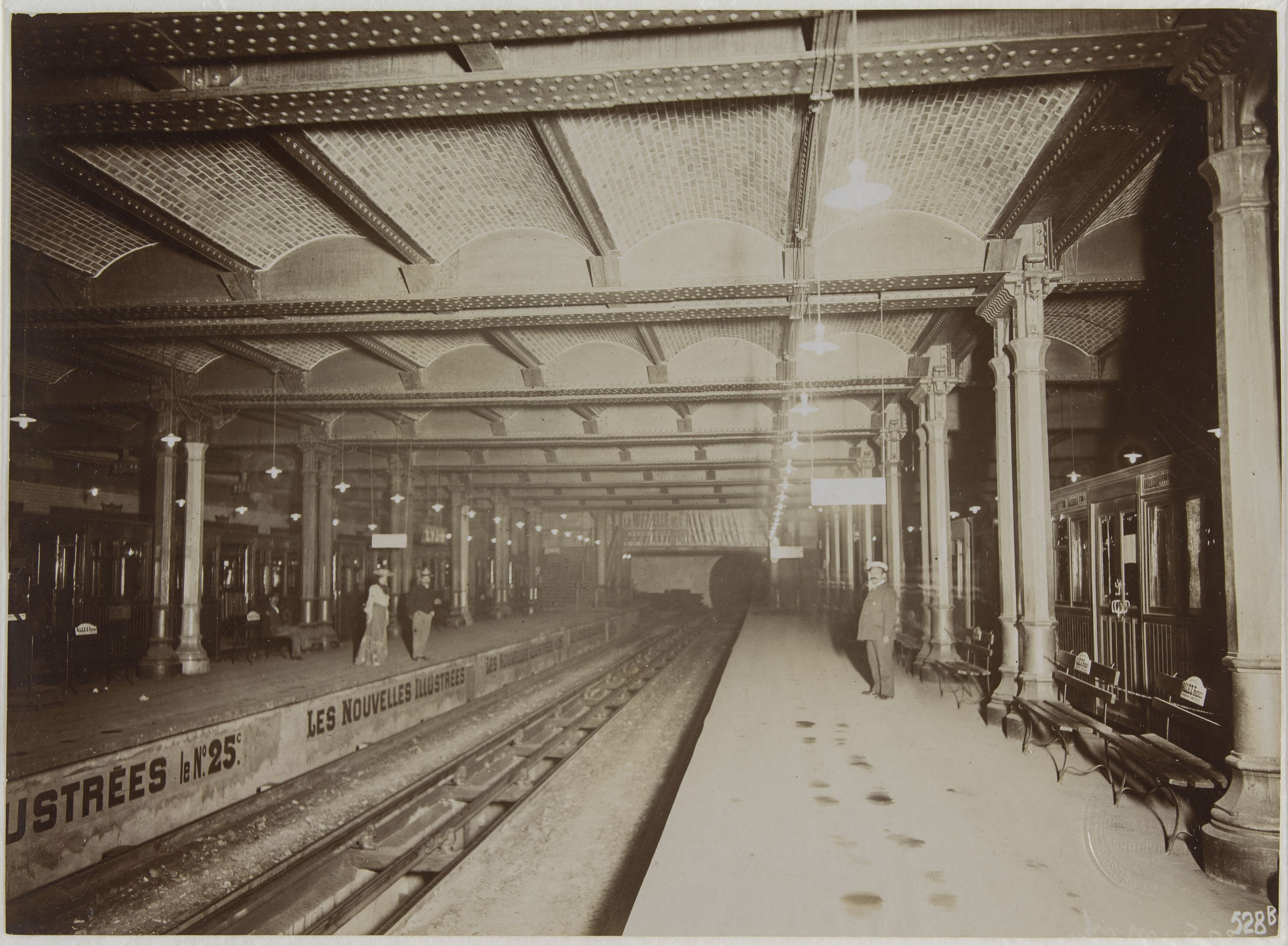
Line 1 platforms in the early 1900s
