= Boulevards of Paris =

Thoroughfare in Paris, France

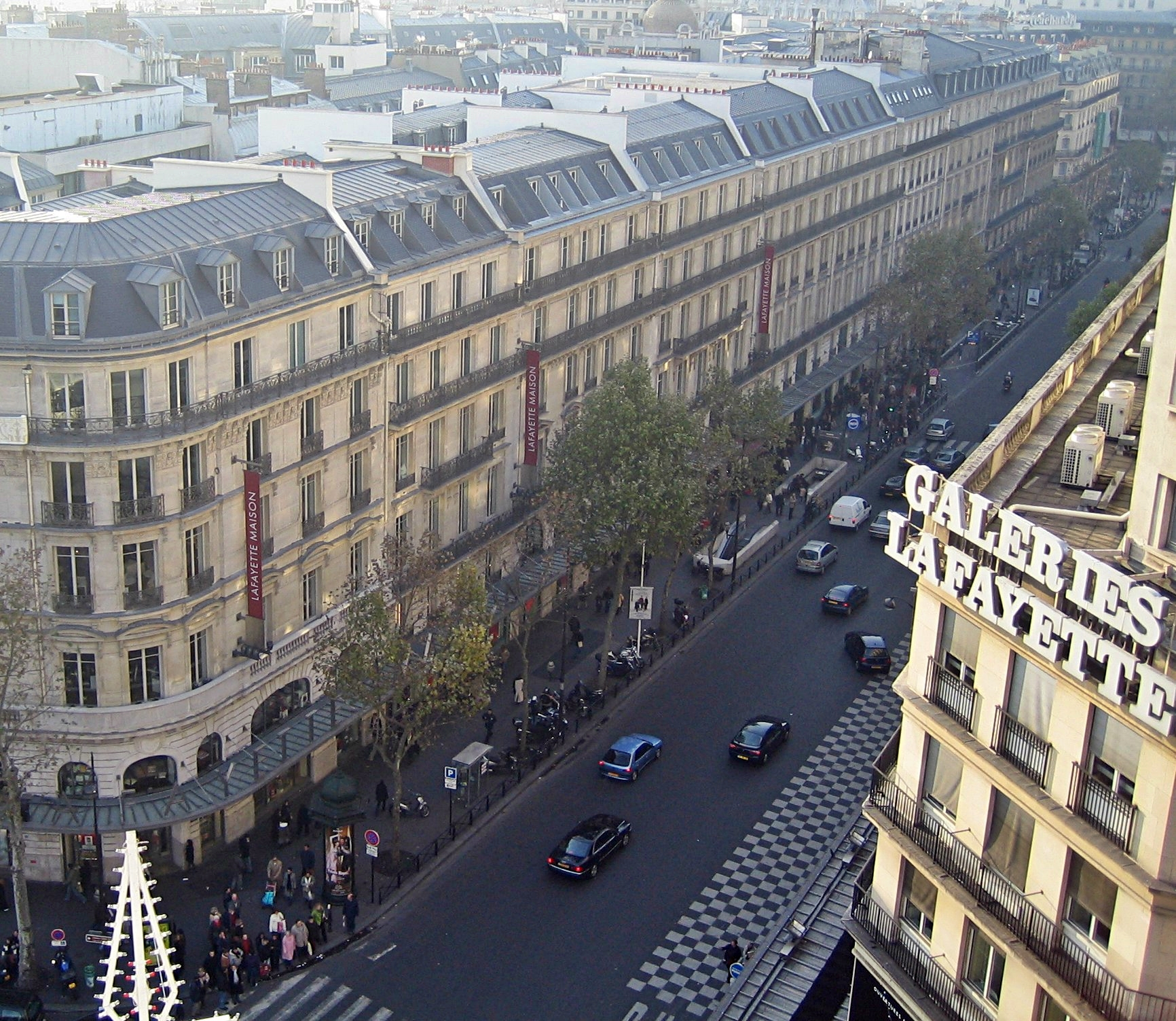
Looking westwards down Boulevard Haussmann and Galeries Lafayette (right)

The Boulevards of Paris (French: Boulevards de Paris) are boulevards which form an important part of the urban landscape of Paris. The boulevards were constructed in several phases by central government initiative as infrastructure improvements, but are very much associated with strolling and leisurely enjoyment in the minds of Parisians.

== The grands boulevards ==
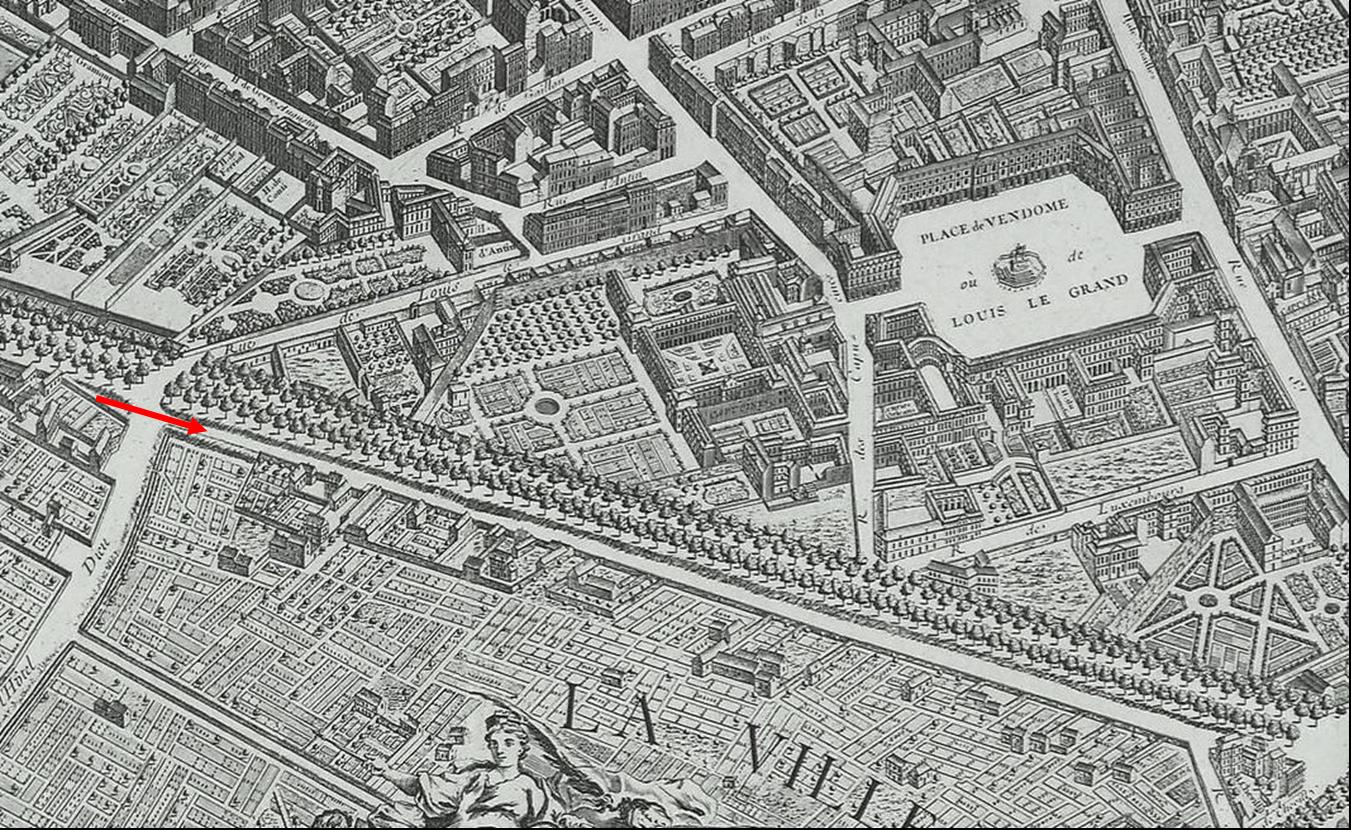
Boulevards on the Turgot map (1736) some years after their creation in place of the Louis XIII wall.

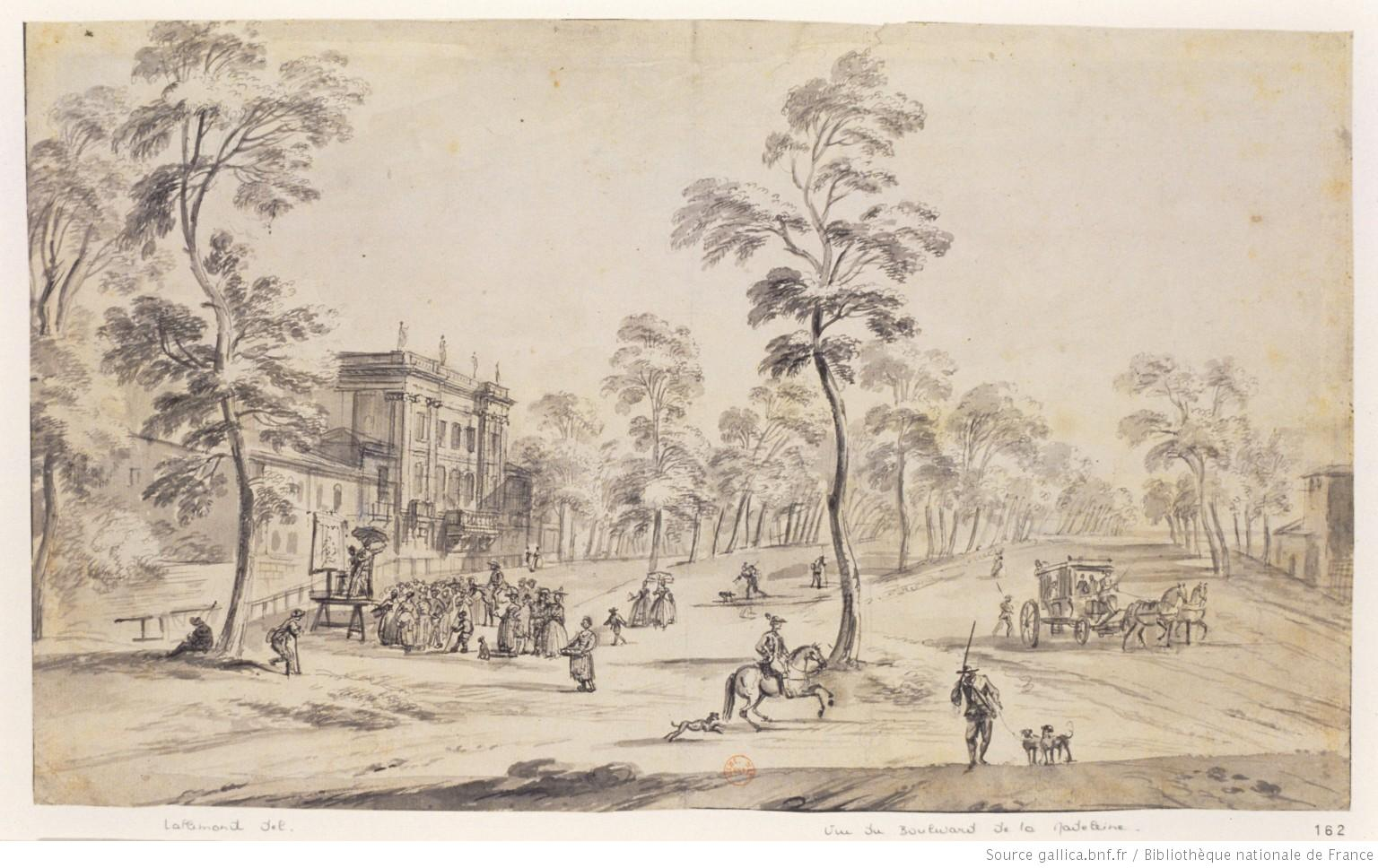
Boulevard des Capucines, sometime after its creation. Note the unflattened soil and a double line of trees for carriage circulation.

The Grands Boulevards are the quintessence of the Parisian boulevards. Their origin is a plan initiated by Louis XIV's minister Jean-Baptiste Colbert in the late 1660s, of comprehensive reforms and remodeling of Paris. Aside of the demilitarization of the former city walls and their replacement with a ring of Grand Boulevards, started in 1670, the plan included the establishment of the Lieutenant général de police in 1667; the destruction of all gates of the ancient Wall of Philip II Augustus on the left bank, started in 1673 and completed in 1783; the unification of professional regulations in the city and its outskirts (French: faubourgs) in 1673; the termination of lingering feudal authority over criminal justice in a number of mostly ecclesiastical enclaves that was transferred to the king's Grand Châtelet in 1674; and the erection or refurbishment of monumental gates on key intersections, namely the Porte Saint-Antoine in 1671, the Porte Saint-Bernard, the Porte Saint-Denis in 1672-1673, the Porte Saint-Martin in 1674, and a massive triumphal arch to be erected on what is now the Place de la Nation, started in the 1670s but abandoned around 1680 and whose unfinished structures were eventually demolished in 1716.

If defined by that historic origin, the expression "Grands Boulevards" should only follow the thoroughfares along the former Wall of Charles V and Wall of Louis XIII on the right bank, namely the Boulevard Beaumarchais, Boulevard des Filles-du-Calvaire, Boulevard du Temple, Boulevard Saint-Martin, Boulevard Saint-Denis, Boulevard de Bonne-Nouvelle, Boulevard Poissonnière, Boulevard Montmartre, Boulevard des Italiens, Boulevard des Capucines and Boulevard de la Madeleine. However, Parisian habit also includes Boulevard Haussmann, with its department stores Printemps and Galeries Lafayette, among the quintessential Grands Boulevards. The later opening of other major arteries such as Boulevard Richard-Lenoir and Avenue de la République has further reduced the salience of the original Grand Boulevards in the Paris topography.

== "Boulevard du Crime" ==
The idea of the boulevard as a centre for leisure asserted itself during the 18th century, when numerous théâtres de la foire set up near the Porte Saint-Martin. The boulevard du Temple became affectionately known as "boulevard du Crime" during Bourbon Restoration, an allusion to the criminal acts portrayed there by stage actors. According to the Almanach des Spectacles, "Tautin was stabbed 16,302 times, Marti poisoned 11,000 times, Fresnoy set on fire 27,000 times in countless ways..., Mademoiselle Adèle Dupuis was seduced, kidnapped or drowned 75,000 times".

Although the "boulevard du Crime" fell victim to Haussmann's transformation, the boulevardier spirit lives on in "théâtre de boulevard".

== Haussmannian boulevards ==
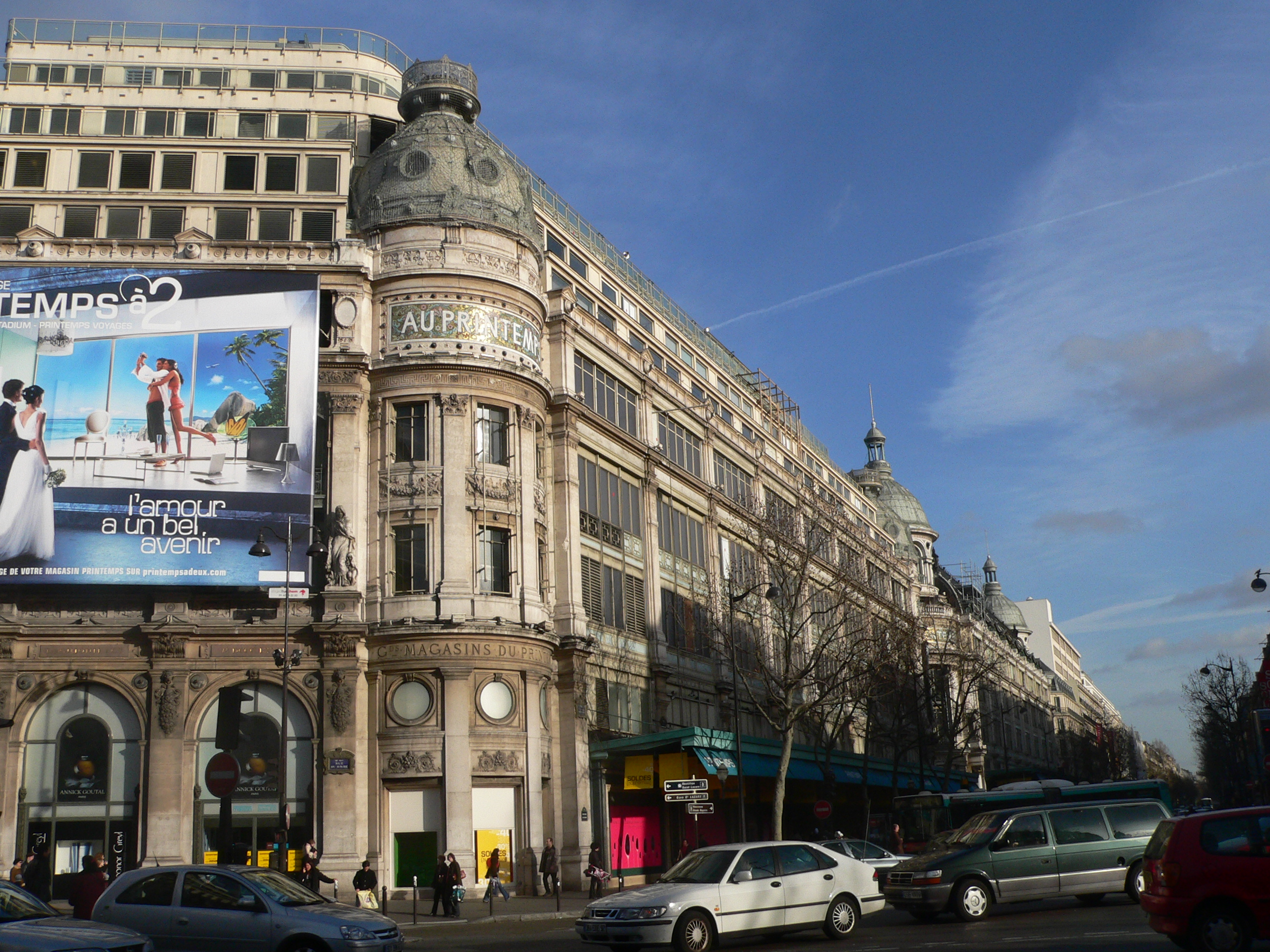
Looking eastwards down Boulevard Haussmann and Printemps department store

From 1784 to 1791, Ledoux built the Wall of the Farmers-General, with boulevards running along its exterior. This wall was built to collect the octroi, a tax on goods entering the city which was hated by Parisians. Although it was almost completely razed by Haussman in 1860 as part of his transformation of Paris, some parts remain. The surviving boulevards were subject to urban planners' failed attempts in the 1950s to transform them into urban freeways.

Haussmann's renovation of Paris brought the boulevard to the heart of Paris, whereas they had hitherto been limited to uninhabited or sparsely inhabited zones. Le boulevard, whose initial function was to go around the capital, became structural urban thoroughfares.

The boulevards from Haussmann and before now define Paris, with uniform façades and overhanging balconies stretching along them. These are immediately recognisable, and are under the strict control of Paris' urban planners.

== The Boulevards of the Marshals ==
Map of the tramway Lines 3a (shown in orange) and 3b (shown in green), which run along the Boulevards of the Marshals

The demolition of the Thiers wall during the 1920s allowed for the creation of a third ring of boulevards surrounding the city. These new boulevards were named after the Marshals of the First French Empire, and are collectively called the Boulevards of the Marshals. They run just inside the city limits.

In addition, the Boulevard Périphérique, the beltway surrounding Paris, was built on the site of the ruins of the Thiers wall, a short distance 'outboard' from the Boulevards of the Marshals. However, it is more like a motorway than a boulevard. Île-de-France tramway Lines 3a and 3b run along the Boulevards of the Marshals, nearly encircling Paris since 3b opened in December 2010, on the sixth anniversary of the opening of 3a along the southern section.

== In popular culture ==
The boulevards provided the setting for Maupassant's Bel Ami. Fred Astaire took to the boulevards in Funny Face (1957).

== See also ==
- Vienna Ring Road
