= Arsenal station (Paris Metro) =

Closed metro station in Paris, France

Coordinates: 48.8491°N 2.3666°E

Arsenal station (French pronunciation: [aʁsnal]) is a ghost station of the Paris Metro, situated on Line 5 between the stations of Bastille and Quai de la Rapée, in the 4th arrondissement of Paris.

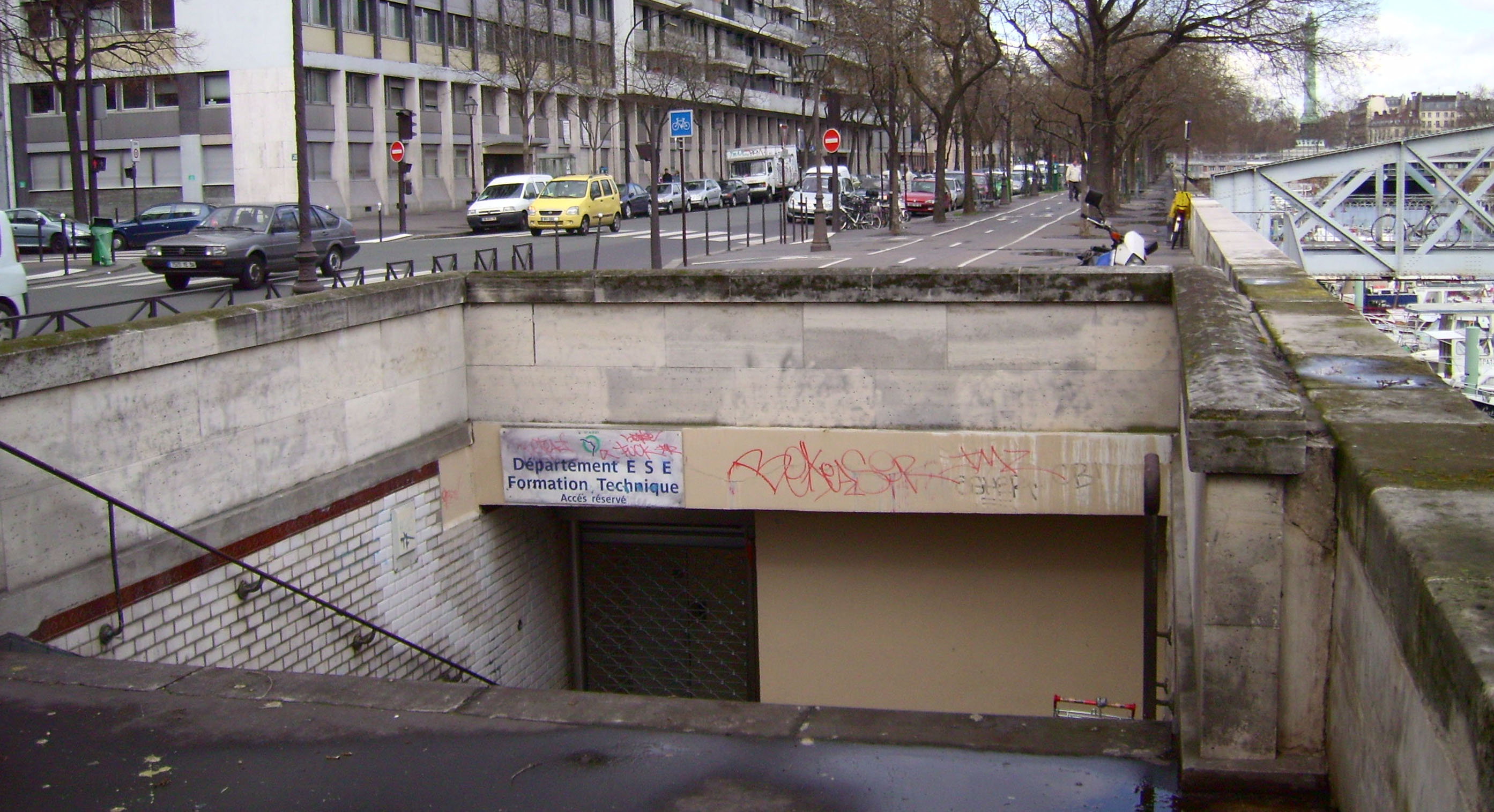
Entrance of the station; in the background, the July Column can be seen, situated in the middle of the Place de la Bastille.

== The station ==
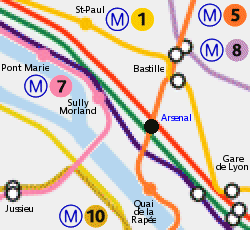
Location

Arsenal station opened to the public in 1906. It was closed on 2 September 1939, as a result of the mobilization of employees of the Compagnie du chemin de fer métropolitain de Paris (CMP) in World War II. The station was reopened after the Liberation, but it closed again because of its close proximity to the neighbouring station of Quai de la Rapée. Today, the station serves as a training centre for RATP agents. Access to the station is situated on Boulevard Bourdon.

== Culture ==
Because of the station's location (just before Quai de la Rapée in the direction towards Voie des Finances), the station played a key element in the film La Grosse Caisse, starring Bourvil in 1965.

It has been proposed to convert Arsenal into a swimming pool, theatre, restaurant or sculpture gallery.
