= Bastille station (Paris Metro) =

Paris Métro station

Bastille
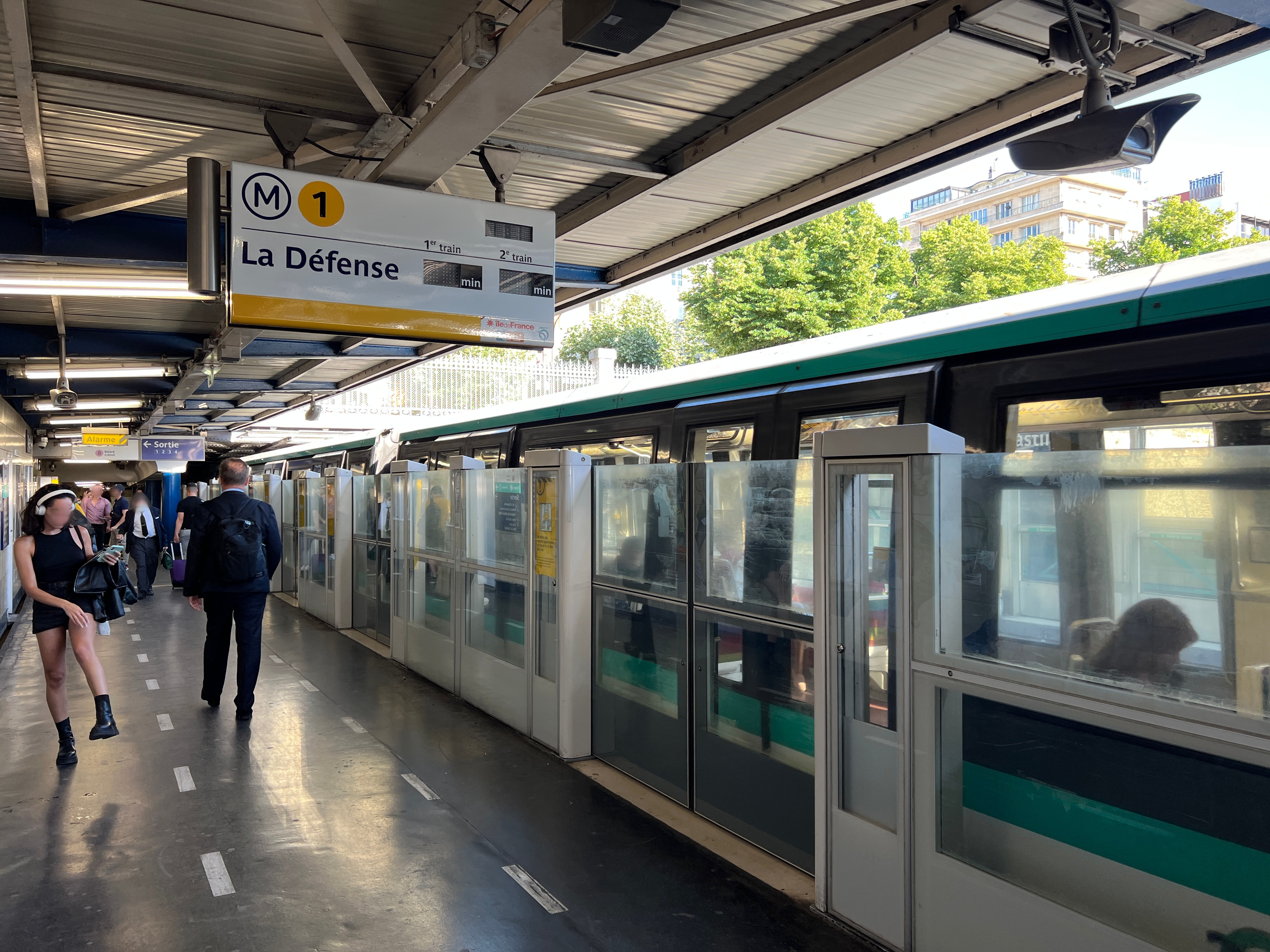
- Line 1 platforms.

General information
- Location: Pl. de la Bastille (two); Boul. Bourdon × Boul. Henri IV; 37, Boul. Bourdon; 130, Rue de Lyon; 140, Rue de Lyon; 1, Rue de Charenton; 1, Boul. Beaumarchais; 2, Boul. Beaumarchais; 4th, 11th and 12th arrondissement of Paris; Île-de-France; France
- Coordinates: 48°51′11″N 2°22′09″E
- Owner: RATP
- Operator: RATP
- Lines: Line 1; Line 5; Line 8
- Platforms: 6
- Tracks: 6
- Bus routes: : 29, 69, 76, 86, 87, 91; : N01, N02, N11, N16, N144
- Bus operators: RATP, Noctilien

Construction
- Structure type: At-grade (Line 1); Underground (Lines 5, 8)
- Accessible: No

Other information
- Station code: 1212
- Fare zone: 1

History
- Opened: Line 1: 19 July 1900; Line 5: 17 December 1906; Line 8: 5 May 1931

Services
Preceding station	Paris Metro	Following station
Saint-Paul towards La Défense	Line 1	Gare de Lyon towards Château de Vincennes
Quai de la Rapée towards Place d'Italie	Line 5	Bréguet–Sabin towards Bobigny–Pablo Picasso
Chemin Vert towards Balard	Line 8	Ledru-Rollin towards Pointe du Lac
Route map
Line 1
Line 5
Line 8
Location
- Location within Paris

Bastille (French pronunciation: [bastij]) is a station on Line 1, Line 5 and Line 8 of the Paris Métro. Located under the Place de la Bastille and near the former location of the Bastille, it is situated on the border of the 4th, 11th and 12th arrondissement.

== Location ==
The station is located on Place de la Bastille, the platform being established:

- Line 1, south of the square, outside the Canal Saint-Martin (between Saint-Paul and Gare de Lyon stations);
- Line 5, west of the square between Boulevard Richard-Lenoir and Boulevard Bourdon (between Bréguet-Sabin and Quai de la Rapée stations, not including the Arsenal ghost station);
- Line 8, north of the square between Boulevard Beaumarchais and Rue du Faubourg-Saint-Antoine (between Chemin Vert and Ledru-Rollin stations).

== History ==
The Line 1 station opened as part of the first stage of the line between Porte de Vincennes and Porte Maillot on 19 July 1900.

It derives its name from the Place de la Bastille, symbolic place of the French Revolution, where the old fortress of the Bastille was destroyed between 14 July 1789 and 14 July 1790.

On 17 December 1906, the station of Line 5 was opened when the line was extended from Gare de Lyon to Lancry (now known as Jacques Bonsergent). The Line 8 platforms were opened on 5 May 1931 when the line was extended from Richelieu – Drouot to Porte de Charenton.

During the 1960s, the platform of Line 5 was renovated in the Mouton-Duvernet style with two-toned orange-tinted ceramic tiles, a white painted vault and characteristic lighting strips. Subsequently, they were equipped with seats Motte orange.

The platforms of Line 1 have been upgraded as part of its full automation. They are the last to be equipped with landing doors, in April 2011, because of the technical difficulty presented by the pronounced curve at their western end.

It saw 13,172,392 passengers enter in 2018, which places its attendance at the 10th position of all metro stations.

== Services for passengers ==
=== Access ===
The station has nine entrances from Place de la Bastille:

- Boulevard Henri-IV;
- Boulevard Bourdon;
- Rue de Lyon;
- Boulevard de la Bastille;
- Opera Bastille;
- Jardin du Port-de-l'Arsenal;
- Hospital Quinze-Vingts;
- Rue de la Roquette;
- Rue du Faubourg-Saint-Antoine.

The access leading to the Rue de Lyon was decorated with a Hector Guimard designed entrance registered as a historic monument on 29 May 1978. However, it was later moved to a metro station Boulevard Beaumarchais.

=== Station layout ===
Line 1 platforms	Side platform with PSDs, doors will open on the right
Line 1 platforms	Westbound	← toward La Défense – Grande Arche (Saint-Paul)
Line 1 platforms	Dismantled Island Platform
Line 1 platforms	Eastbound	toward Château de Vincennes (Gare de Lyon) →
Line 1 platforms	Side platform with PSDs, doors will open on the right
1F	Mezzanine for platform connection
Street Level	Entrances/Exits
B1	Mezzanine for platform connection
Line 5 platforms	Side platform, doors will open on the right
Line 5 platforms	Southbound	← toward Place d'Italie (Quai de la Rapée)
Line 5 platforms	Northbound	toward Bobigny – Pablo Picasso (Bréguet – Sabin) →
Line 5 platforms	Side platform, doors will open on the right
Line 8 platforms	Side platform, doors will open on the right
Line 8 platforms	Westbound	← toward Balard (Chemin Vert)
Line 8 platforms	Eastbound	toward Pointe du Lac (Ledru-Rollin) →
Line 8 platforms	Side platform, doors will open on the right

=== Platforms ===
The stations of the lines meeting at Bastille all have side platforms.

The station belonging to Line 1 is very particular for several reasons; it was established on a very tight curve and counter curve, with the platforms partly underground and partly above ground in an elevated viaduct. The western end of the line 1 platforms have the sharpest curve used by passenger trains on the Métro, with a radius of only 40 metres (131 ft). The line 1 platforms, at 123 metres (404 ft) long, are significantly longer than the average Métro platform length. The latter part overlooks the Canal Saint-Martin that, at this point, passes from being underground to open air. The Line 1 station is also particular in that the remnants of a former narrow island platform are visible. The station is also noted for being the only station in the system for being partially underground and elevated. Finally, the tracks and platforms are partly sloped. The ceiling of the east end, which is underground, consists of a metal deck, the silver beams are supported by vertical walls. The decoration of these walls and tunnel exits are "cultural" evoking the French Revolution thanks to a unique ceramics created by Liliane Belembert and Odile Jacquot in May 1989. Part of this fresco was replaced by a plastic display on automation of the line on the occasion of this operation (in the platforms towards La Défense). The open-air part of the platform towards Château de Vincennes has floor-to-ceiling windows offering a view of the Saint-Martin canal opening onto the Bassin de l'Arsenal. Bevelled white ceramic tiles cover only the outlets of the corridors. The name of the station is written in Parisine typeface on enamelled plates. The platforms, equipped with glass edge doors, are devoid of advertisements and seats.

The platforms of Line 5 are underground and have an elliptical vault. The decoration is the style used for the majority of metro stations. The lighting canopies are white and rounded in the Gaudin style of l'Operation Espace Métro 2000, and the white ceramic tiles are covered the walls, the vault, the tunnel exits and the outlets of the corridors. The advertising frames are of white ceramics and the name of the station is written in Parisine typeface on enamelled plates. The seats, in Akiko style, are burgundy. Foundations of one of the counterscarp walls of the old Bastille prison, discovered during the construction of the line in 1905, are visible on the platform in the direction of Bobigny-Pablo Picasso. Metal lines drawn on the ground mark the contours of the building on the two platforms. The station also exhibits various views of the ancient fortress.

The platforms of Line 8 are also underground under an elliptical vault. They are furnished in the Andreu-Motte style with two orange light canopies, benches and outlets in the corridors treated with flat brown tiles and Motte orange seats. These arrangements are married with the flat white ceramic tiles that cover the walls, vault and tunnel exits, making this station one of the few to have the Andreu-Motte preserved style. Advertising frames are metallic and the name of the station is Parisine typeface on enamelled plates. The station is distinguished however by the lower part of its walls which are vertical and not elliptical.

=== Bus connections ===
The station is served by lines 29, 69, 76, 86, 87 and 91 of the RATP Bus Network as well as the OpenTour tourist line. At night, it is served by lines N01, N02, N11, and N16 of the Noctilien bus network.

== Nearby ==
- Place de la Bastille, the location of the Bastille, stormed on 14 July 1789
- Opéra Bastille, opera house
- Promenade Plantée, a 4.5-kilometre long (2.8 mi) elevated garden along the abandoned railway which led to the former Gare de La Bastille railway station.
- Bassin de l'Arsenal, boat basin
- July Column, a monument to the revolution of 1830
- Temple du Marais, an historic Protestant church

== Gallery ==
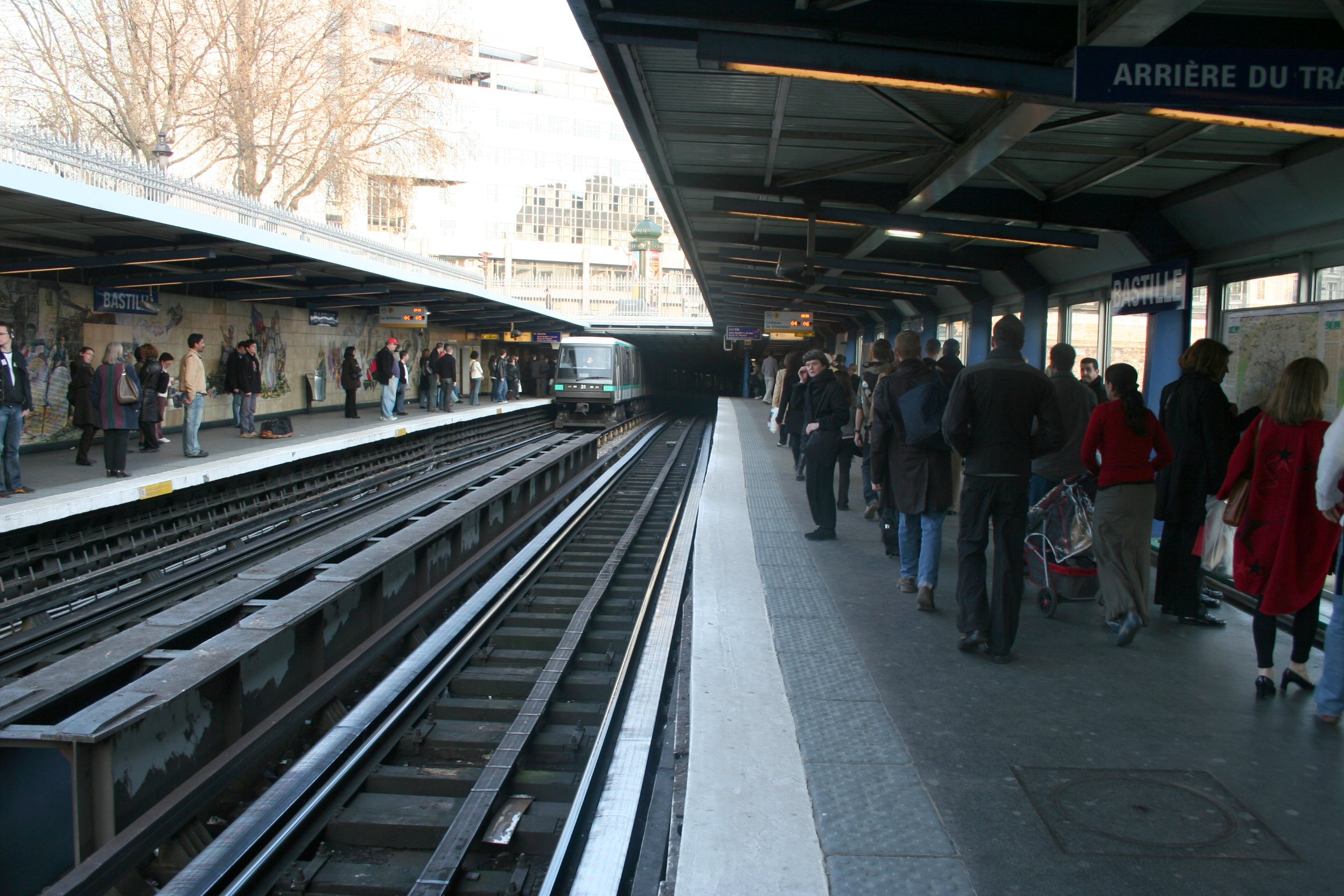
Line 1 platforms before the installation of Platform Screen Doors.

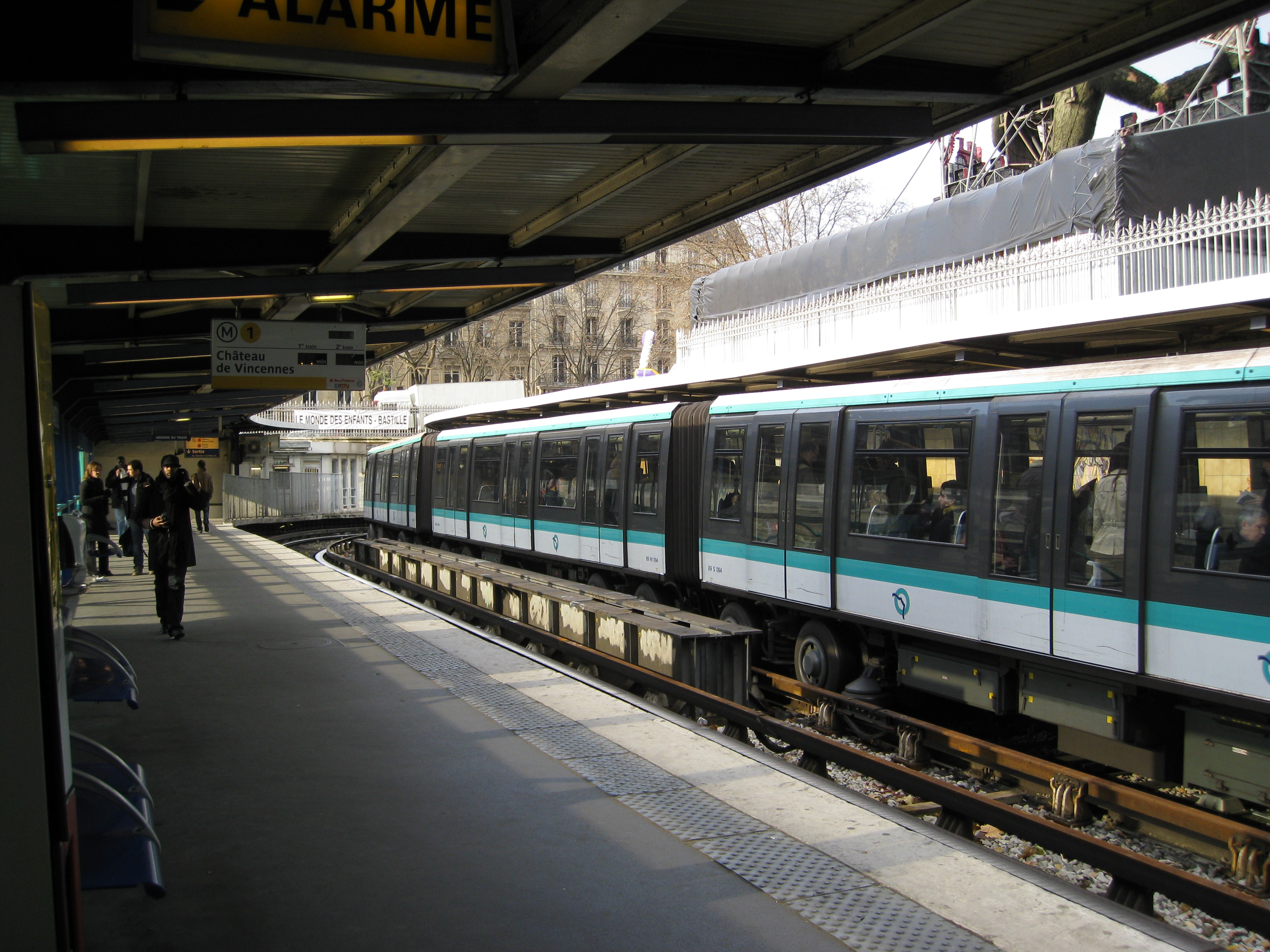
MP 89 stock on Line 1

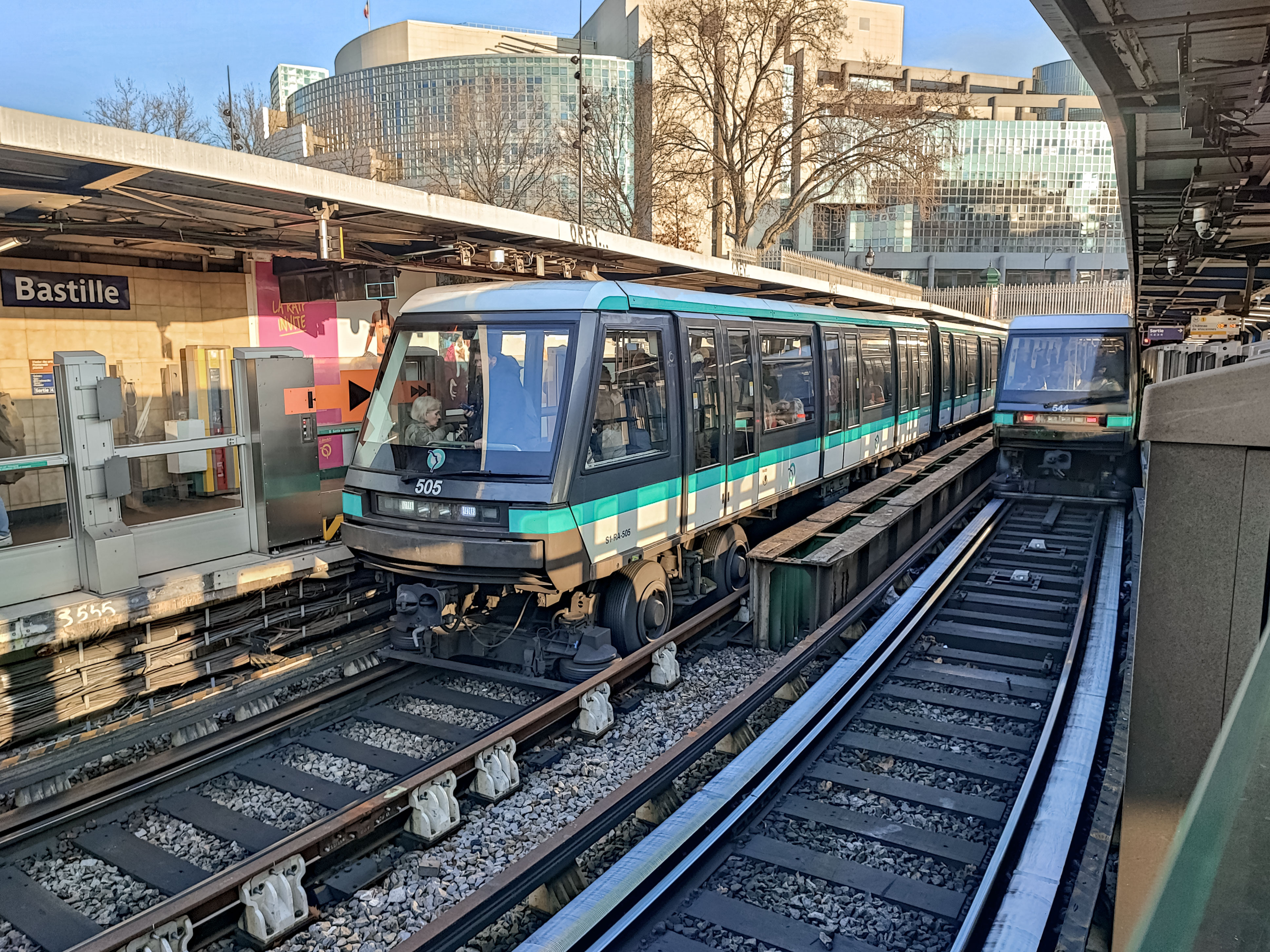
MP 05 trains on Line 1

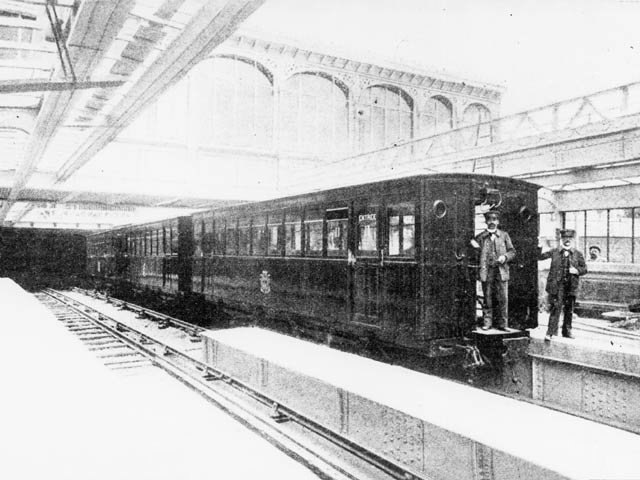
M1 trainset at Bastille, circa 1900s

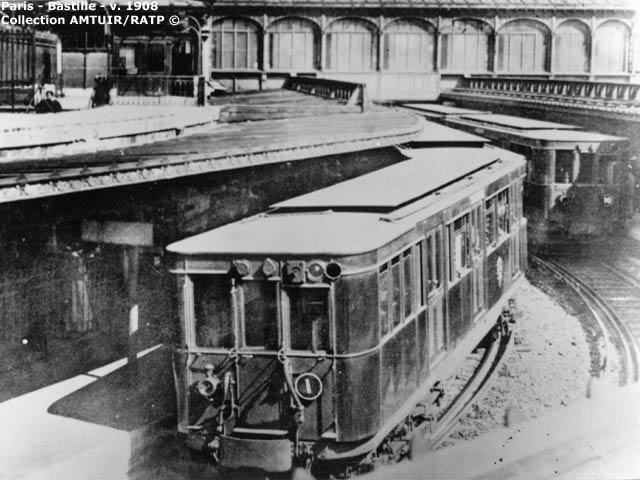
Two Sprague-Thomson trains negotiate the curve at the western end of the Line 1 platforms in 1908

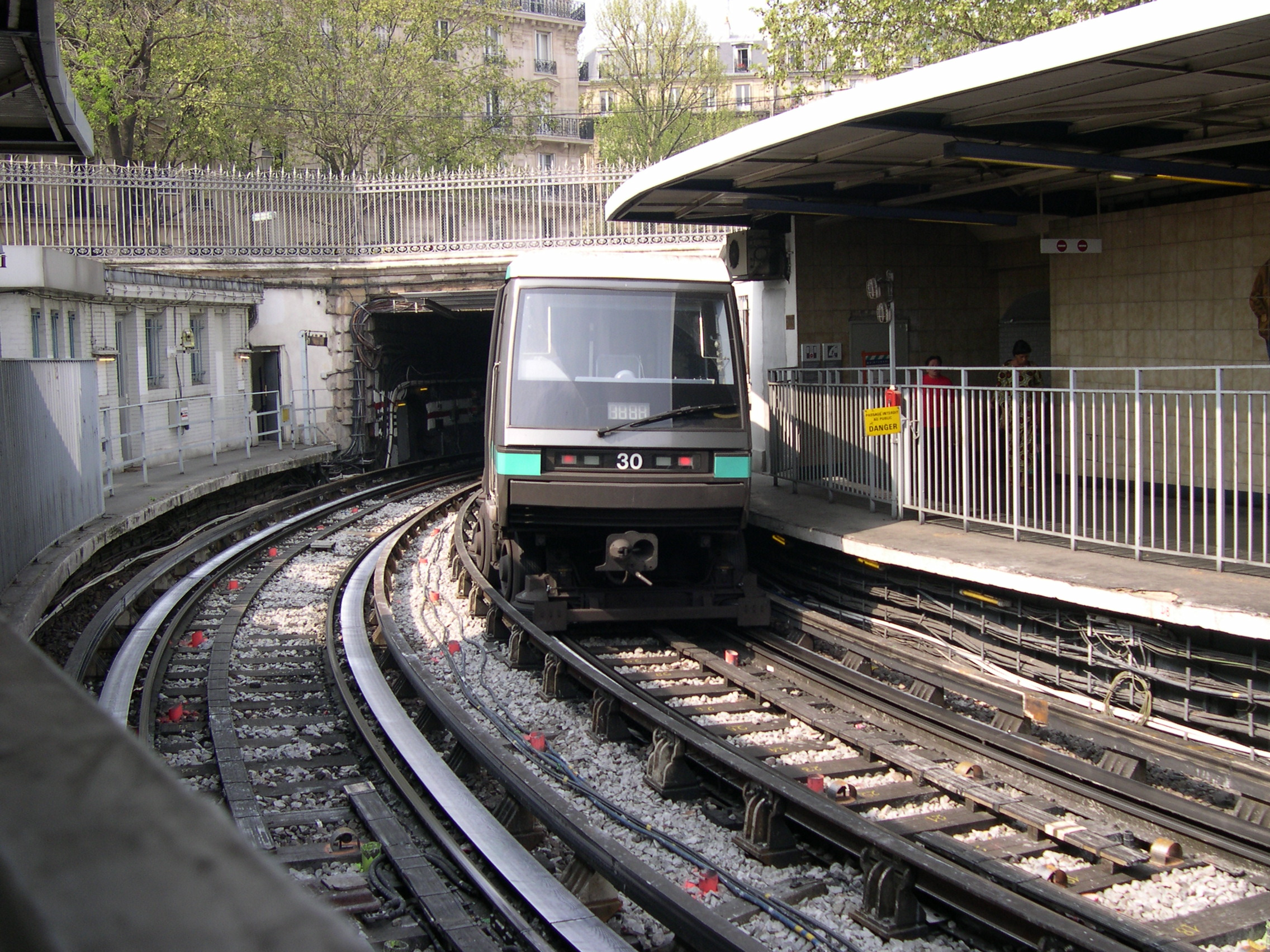
An MP 89 train negotiating the same curve in 2007

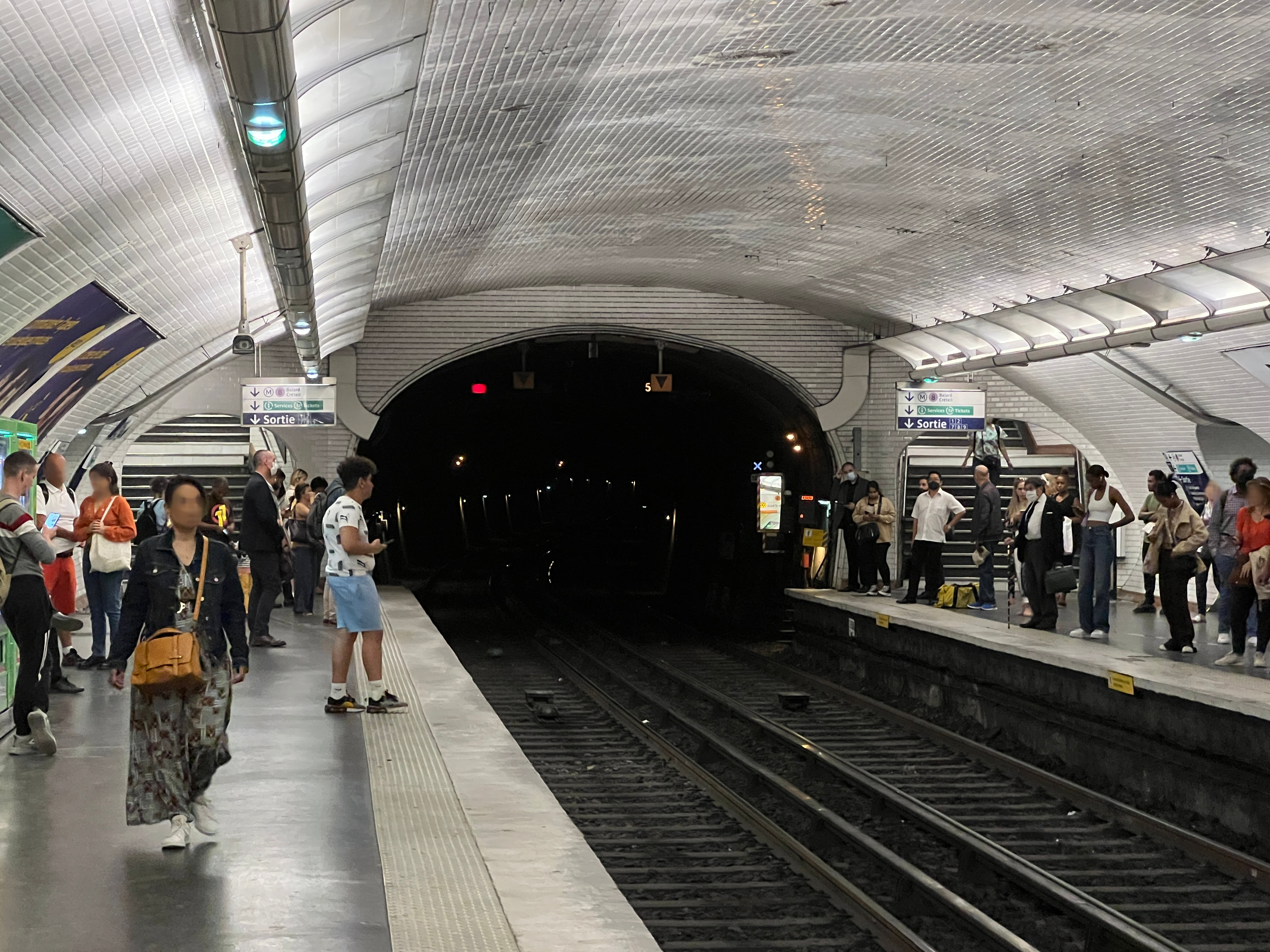
Line 5 platforms

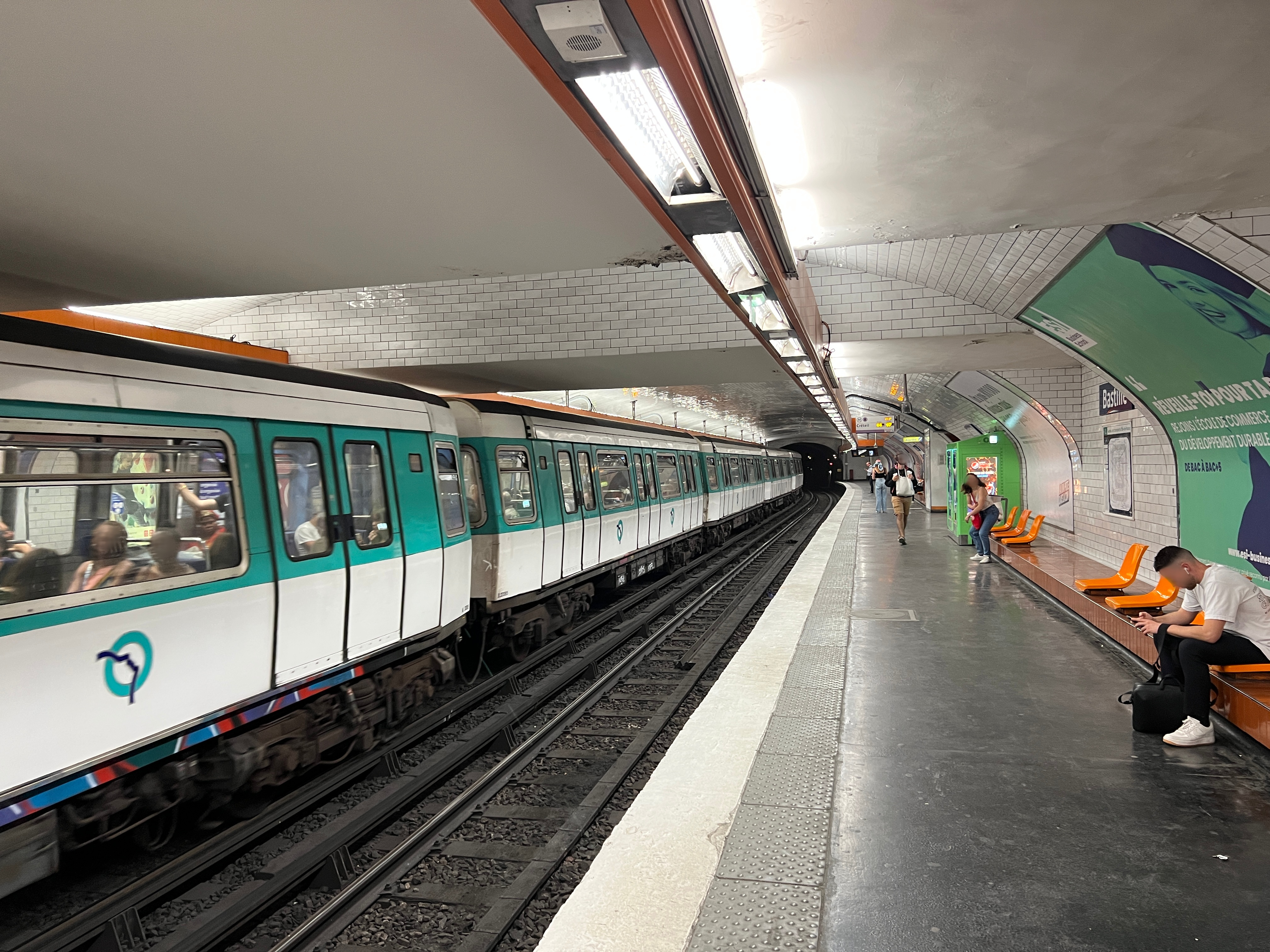
Line 8 platforms
