= Boulevard de la Madeleine =

Boulevard in Paris, France

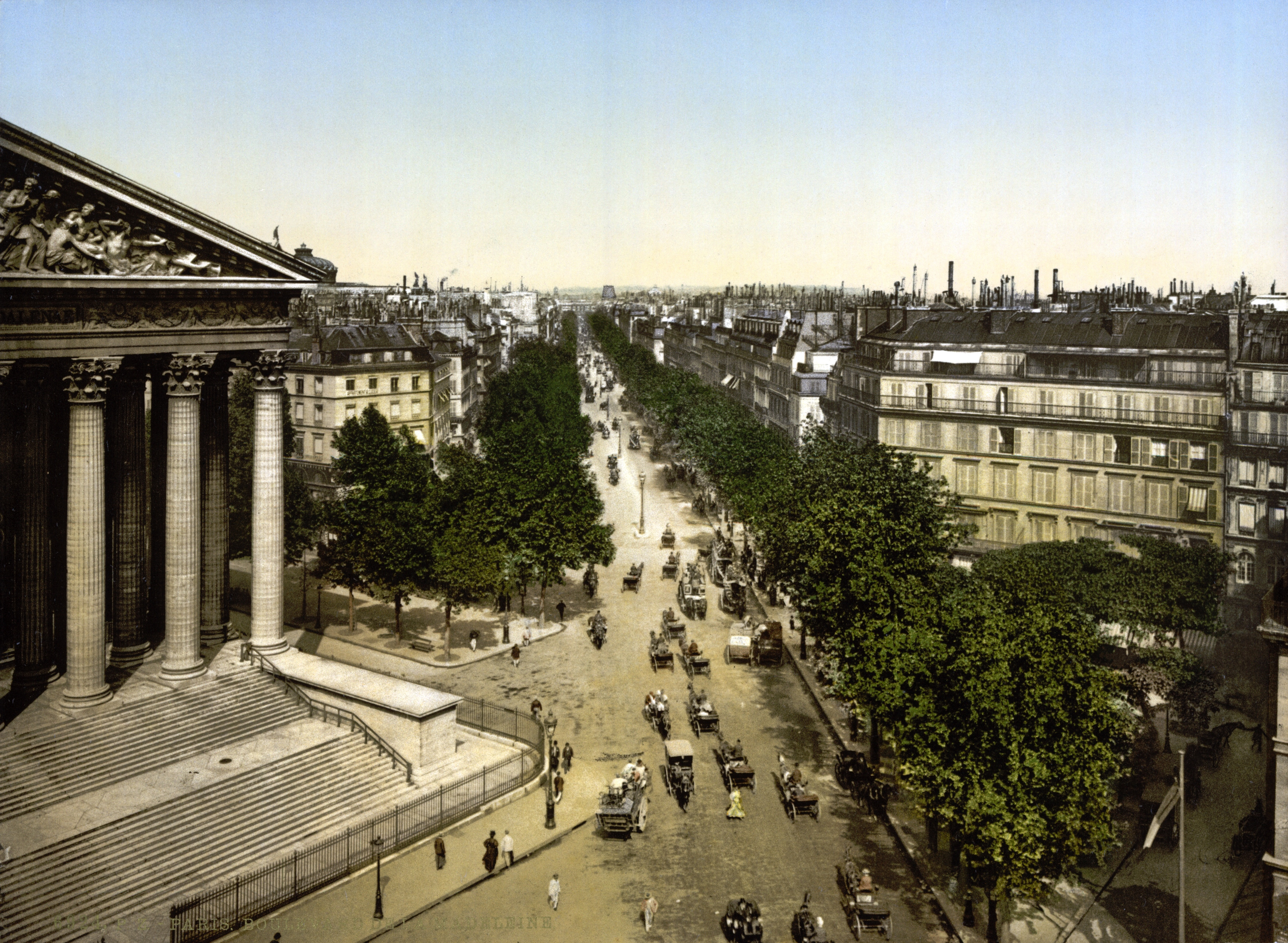
- Boulevard de la Madeleine, c. 1895

- Location within Paris
- Namesake: Church of Saint-Marie-Madeleine
- Length: 220 m (720 ft)
- Width: 43.3 m (142 ft)
- Arrondissement: 1st, 8th, 9th
- Quarter: Madeleine. Place Vendôme. Chaussée d'Antin.
- Coordinates: 48°52′10.81″N 2°19′35.38″E
- From: 53 rue Cambon
- To: 10-16 place de la Madeleine

Construction
- Completion: 1676

The Boulevard de la Madeleine (French pronunciation: [bulvaʁ də la madlɛn]) is one of the 11 original grands boulevards of Paris, France, a chain of roads running in a semicircle on the right bank of Paris where the city's defensive walls used to be located.

The boulevard is named after the nearby Église de la Madeleine.

Located near the Metro stations: Madeleine and Opéra.

== Notable addresses ==
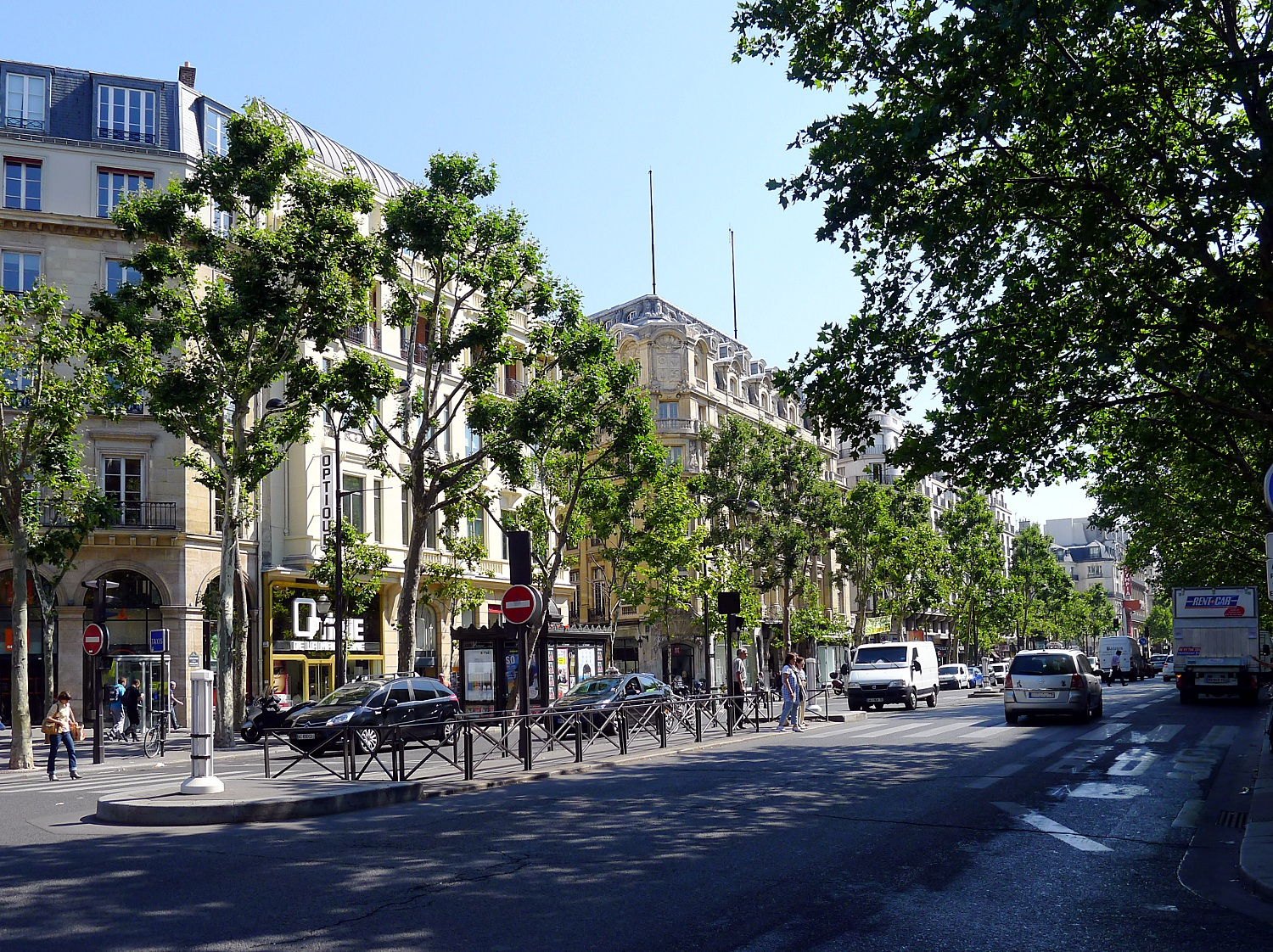
Boulevard de la Madeleine

- No. 5: In the 1920s, la Galerie Adolphe LeGoup was located here.
- No. 11: Building where Alphonsine Plessis, better known as Marie Duplessis died in February 1847. Her life and death were depicted by Alexandre Dumas fils in the novel la Dame aux Camélias and by Giuseppe Verdi in the opera La Traviata.

== Cultural references ==
In 1966, The Moody Blues recorded a single named after this boulevard.
