= Quai de la Rapée station =

Paris Métro station

Quai de la Rapée
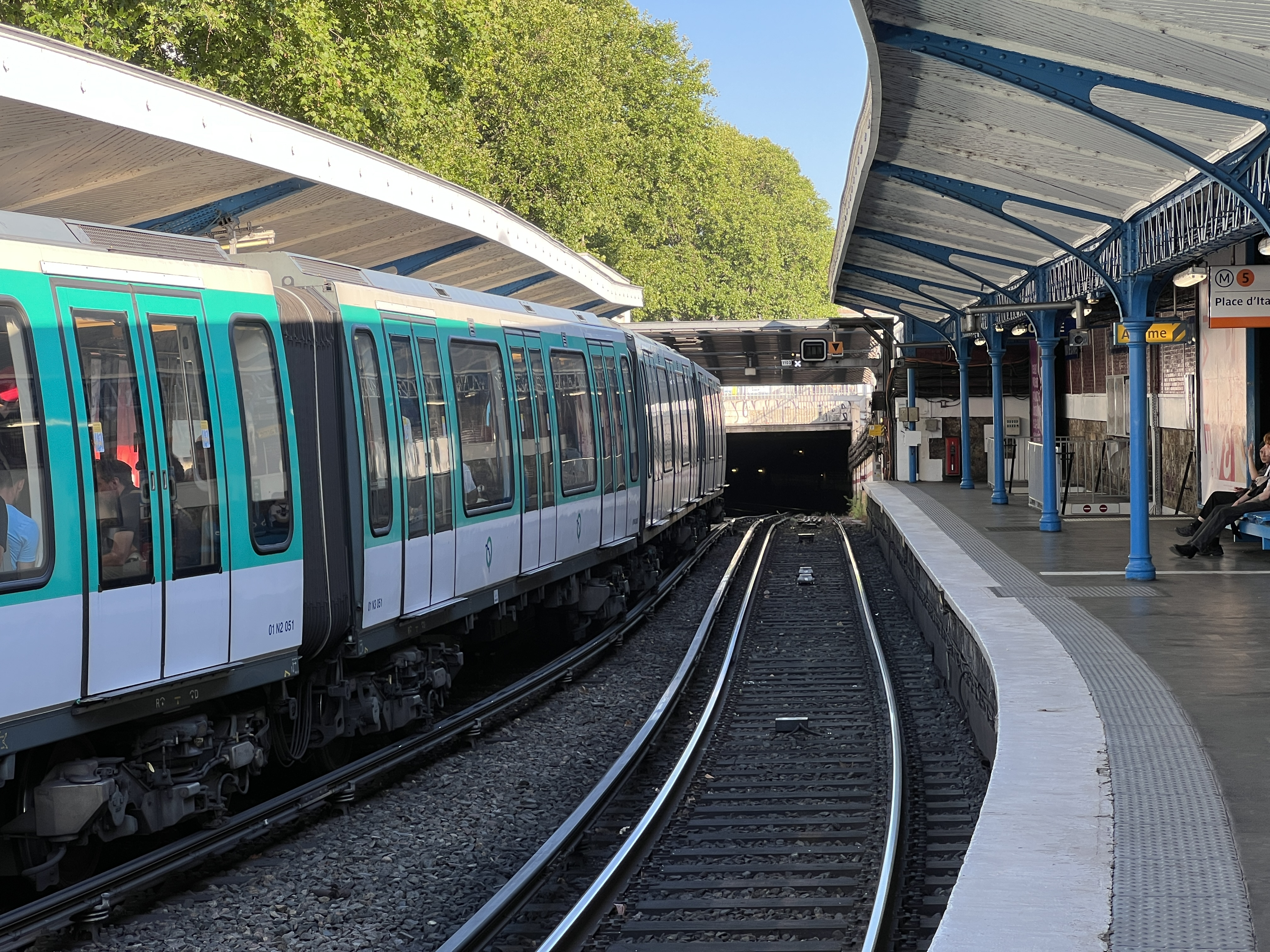
- MF 01 rolling stock on Line 5 at Quai de la Rapée. Looking SE towards the tunnel under the Pont d’Austerlitz.

General information
- Location: Quai de la Rapée × pont d'Austerlitz; 12th arrondissement of Paris; Île-de-France; France
- Coordinates: 48°50′46″N 2°21′58″E
- Owner: RATP
- Operator: RATP
- Line: Line 5
- Platforms: 2
- Tracks: 2
- Connections: RATP: 24, 57, 61, 63, 72, 77, 91; Noctilien: N01, N02, N31

Construction
- Accessible: No

Other information
- Station code: 09-10
- Fare zone: 1

History
- Opened: 14 July 1906
- Former names: Place Mazas, Pont d'Austerlitz

Services
Preceding station	Paris Metro	Following station
Gare d'Austerlitz towards Place d'Italie	Line 5	Bastille towards Bobigny–Pablo Picasso
Location
- Location within Paris

Quai de la Rapée (French pronunciation: [kɛ d(ə) la ʁape]) is an above-ground station on Line 5 of the Paris Métro, located near the Pont d’Austerlitz and Gare de Lyon at the western edge of the 12th arrondissement. In 2021, 798,728 passengers entered the metro system here, ranking it 289th out of 371 stations. The name refers to a nearby traffic artery.

== Location ==
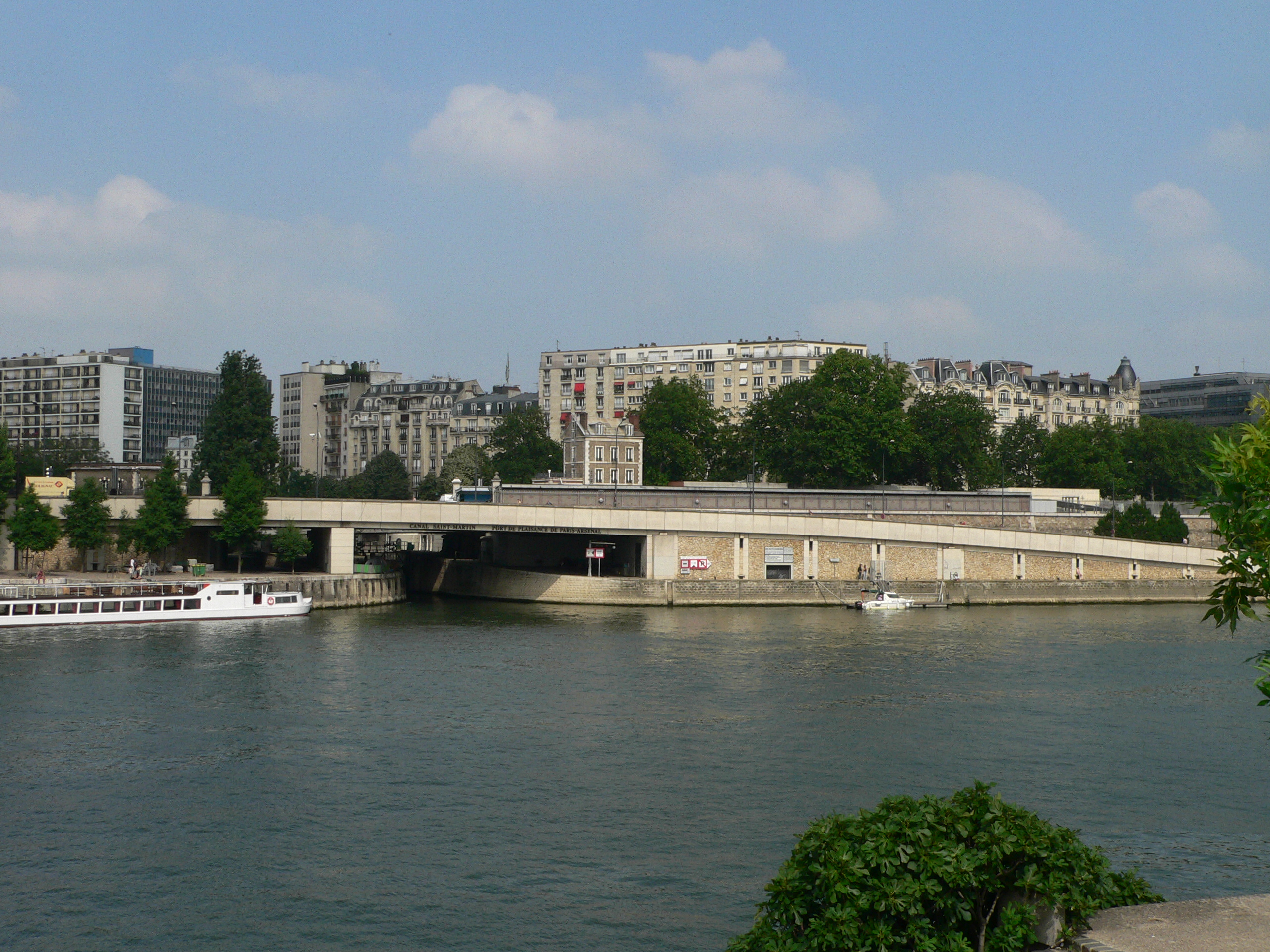
The station, above and adjacent to the entrance to the Arsenal Basin. (viewed from Left Bank of the Seine)

The station is located above ground, near and parallel to the Right Bank of the Seine, just southeast of the canal lock that connects the Seine with the Arsenal Basin and Canal Saint-Martin. Since the 1960s, the riverbank adjacent to the station has been occupied by the Voie Mazas segment of the Pompidou motorway. Parallel to the station on its northeast side is the Quai de la Rapée, the older riverside traffic artery that bears this name between the Arsenal Basin and Bercy. Southeast of the station is the Place Mazas (see below) and the Pont d’Austerlitz vehicle bridge, the latter being, like Line 5, a major river crossing. The Gare de Lyon is about 500 meters to the east, usually reached by Line 5 passengers by changing to Line 1 at Bastille.

The Viaduc du Quai de la Rapée (1905-06) addressed one the engineering challenges of the early metro: the sharp 90° curve and steep 4% descent from the Viaduc d’Austerlitz to connect with a subway tunnel on the Right Bank. The city separated the project from the river bridge contract with Constructions de Levallois-Perret, and assigned the work to Dadye et Pillé. For the Rapée viaduct, rather than join rectangular box spans at angles (as was done for the viaducts supporting the above-ground curves on today’s Lines 2 and 6), the firm devised and executed helical spans that closely followed the curve of the track. The solution was ingenious and elegant, but demanding of construction skills and metal, and was never repeated.

The station’s proximity to the Seine resulted in its submergence during the historic flood of 1910.

== History ==
A station flanked by water on two sides, in the corner of a neglected public space in an area focused on wholesale commerce was not primarily intended to service local passengers. The station at Place Mazas that appeared in the earliest plans for the Metropolitan was a junction for the two lines routed toward the Austerlitz traffic bridge. One envisaged line ran north from Place d’Italie, crossing the Seine, and joining Line 1 at Gare de Lyon, sharing its tracks to Nation. The future Line 5 running south from Gare de l’Est to Bastille and the Seine would connect with it at Place Mazas.

Once Line 1 of the metro proved unexpectedly popular and further construction of the network got underway, however, new political and technical issues soon affected the plans. The track geometry in the Place Mazas sector went through several notional configurations, and the path of the Austerlitz Viaduct was shifted 200 meters upstream. By the time railbeds were laid in 1905, traffic from the Left Bank would take the current Line 5 path: along the river and the west flank of the Saint Martin Canal to Bastille, where travelers bound for Gare de Lyon would transfer to Line 1. The double-tracked tunnel between the riverbank and Line 1 at Gare de Lyon was completed only as a maintenance connection.

The station at Place Mazas came into use in July 1906 with the completion of the Rapée Viaduc. The street entrance was not yet open and the onward line to Bastille unfinished, but the city and the CMP were keen get the long-delayed Left Bank metro connected to Gare de Lyon and the other lines on the Right Bank. Until 17 December there was onward service to Gare de Lyon using the maintenance tunnel to a shared Line 1 platform. This was discontinued when Line 5 was opened from Place Mazas to Bastille and Lancry (Jacques Bonsergent).

Relatively few Parisians lived in the neighborhood of Place Mazas in the early 20th century. But it was a traffic hub with tramway routes that radiated into districts on both sides of the Pont d’Austerlitz and river taxis which stopped at the bridge’s footings. The neighborhood west of the Gare de Lyon gradually developed residential, retail, and services. The population of the station’s service area was somewhat enlarged in 1939 with the closure of the Line 5 Arsenal station, midway between Rapée and Bastille. In recent decades, the area along the Quai de la Rapée has been redeveloped with large residential and office buildings.

The station has had three names. It opened as Place Mazas, the riverside tract through which Line 5 passes and on which is the station’s sole entrance. In October 1907 the station was renamed Pont d’Austerlitz, one of several name changes made when the Left Bank circular line between Place de l’Etoile and Place d’Italie (Ligne 2-sud) became part of Line 5. Unfortunately for passengers unfamiliar with the area, the Pont d’Austerlitz has landings on both sides of the Seine, and Austerlitz was becoming a popular name for the mainline railway station and its immediate neighborhood on the Left Bank side of the bridge. In June 1916 the metro station was re-named Quai de la Rapée, probably to alleviate confusion among military personnel transiting Paris. The name refers to the segment of the nearby, centuries-old road paralleling the Seine, between the Arsenal Basin and Bercy. The road was named after Thomas, Sieur de la Rapée, son of Jean le Cop, head of military supply under Louis XV, who established the family seat in the vicinity.

The Quai de la Rapée station is the primary setting of Alex Joffé’s 1965 heist comedy La Grosse Caisse (The Big Swag). The lead character, Louis Bourdin (Bourvil), is a lowly ticket-puncher at the station who plans a robbery of the nightly train that collects the cash from metro fareboxes. The film used location footage of the station, metro, viaducts, and the Place Mazas area. But the dialogue scenes in the Quai de la Rapée station were shot on a studio set, and stand-ins were used for the other stations, the track junction to the RATP coffers, and various outdoor scenes.

== Nearby ==
=== Place Mazas ===
A 350 meter-long riverside tract bisected by the roadway crossing the Pont d’Austerlitz, the Place was ordered built by Napoleon in 1806. It was to provide a suitably grand, semi-circular, Right Bank landing for the span, one of his three new traffic bridges over the Seine and named after his 1805 victory. The Place, like several streets near the Pont, was named in honor of a superior officer killed in that battle: Colonel Jacques François Marc Mazas. However, the Place was never properly shaped or developed as a public space. During the 19th century it often hosted the spillover from the commercial and transport activities that soon surrounded it. When metro Lines 1 and 5 and the system’s main power generating plant were constructed nearby between 1898 and 1906, materials and equipment were staged here.

But upon their completion the area was beautified and the new viaducts were points of attraction. Except for the water taxi dock, shipping was cleared from the banks of the Seine. The Place was gravelled and trees planted, with access paths to masonry river embankments which replaced the old Port Mazas wharves. The area regressed with the 1910 flood and the temporary return of logistical activities during World War I. But in the 1920s the redbrick city morgue, the Institut médico-légal de Paris, was erected in the curve of the Rapée Viaduct. The remainder of the area east of the Pont d’Austerlitz became a small park, today’s Square Albert Tournaire, while the western section around the metro station was laid out as a French-style garden.

After World War II, however, Place Mazas became a traffic island when the automobile culture inundated Paris. In the 1950s, engineers carved off sections to widen the Quai de la Rapée and the approach to the Pont d’Austerlitz, further separating the two parts of the Place from each other and from the neighborhood to the northwest. The garden adjoining the station was levelled and the area used as a car park for decades. The construction of the Voie Mazas motorway in 1958 eliminated its riverfront esplanade. A municipal maintenance building, a lockkeepers house, and a large, still-paved surface occupy the area around the station, but the city has plans for high-rise housing and street animation.

Other

• The neighborhood to the northwest of the station is apartment buildings and offices, as well as hotels and services that grew up around the Gare de Lyon. Large, recent office development is adjacent to the Quai de la Rapée to the east.

• 500 meters southeast at 54 Quai de la Rapée are the offices of the RATP (Le Maison de la RATP), built on the site of the CMP’s initial electrical generating plant and administrative offices. It occasionally has temporary exhibits, but no museum or gift shop.

• 100 meters to the north of the station entrance is the Arsenal Basin, excavated in the early 1800s as a commercial port on the Saint-Martin Canal. Since the 1980s it has provided wharfage for recreational boats, which also tie up along the Seine on both sides of the Morland lock.

• Between the station and the Arsenal Basin, a small parcel of open space was landscaped and in 2022 named Place Philippe-de-Broca, after the filmmaker.

== Services for passengers ==
=== Access ===
The station has a single access from Place Mazas.

=== Station layout ===
Line 5 platforms	Side platform, doors will open on the right
Line 5 platforms	Southbound	← toward Place d'Italie (Gare d'Austerlitz)
Line 5 platforms	Northbound	toward Bobigny – Pablo Picasso (Bastille) →
Line 5 platforms	Side platform, doors will open on the right

1F	Mezzanine for platform connection

Street Level

=== Bus connections ===
The station is served by line 72 of the RATP Bus Network, and at short distance by lines 24, 57, 61, 63 and 91 of the RATP bus network and, at night, by lines N01, N02 and N31 of the Noctilien network.

== Gallery ==
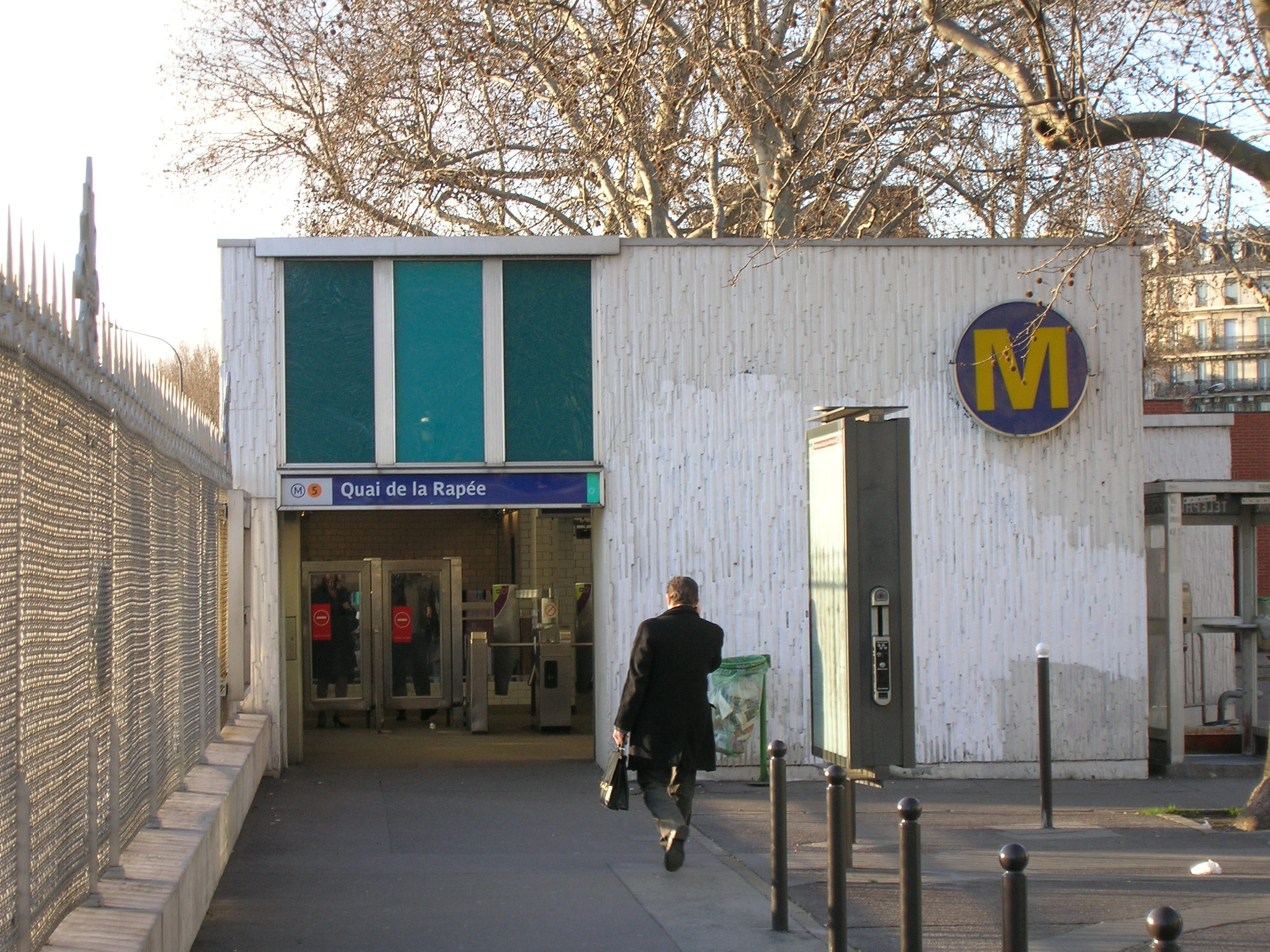
The station's sole entrance, on Place Mazas

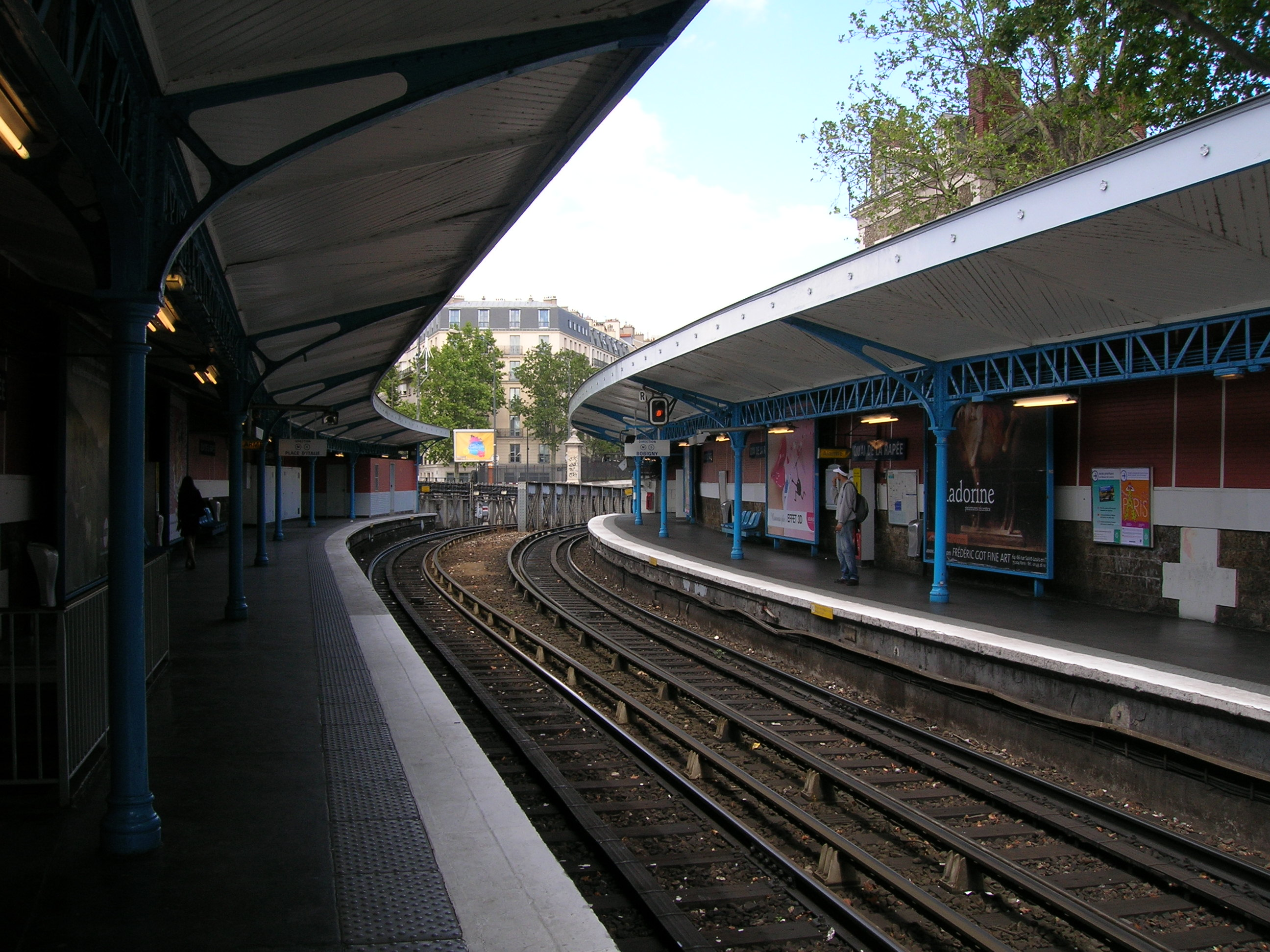
Line 5 platforms at Quai de la Rapée, looking northwest towards the bridge over the Morland Lock

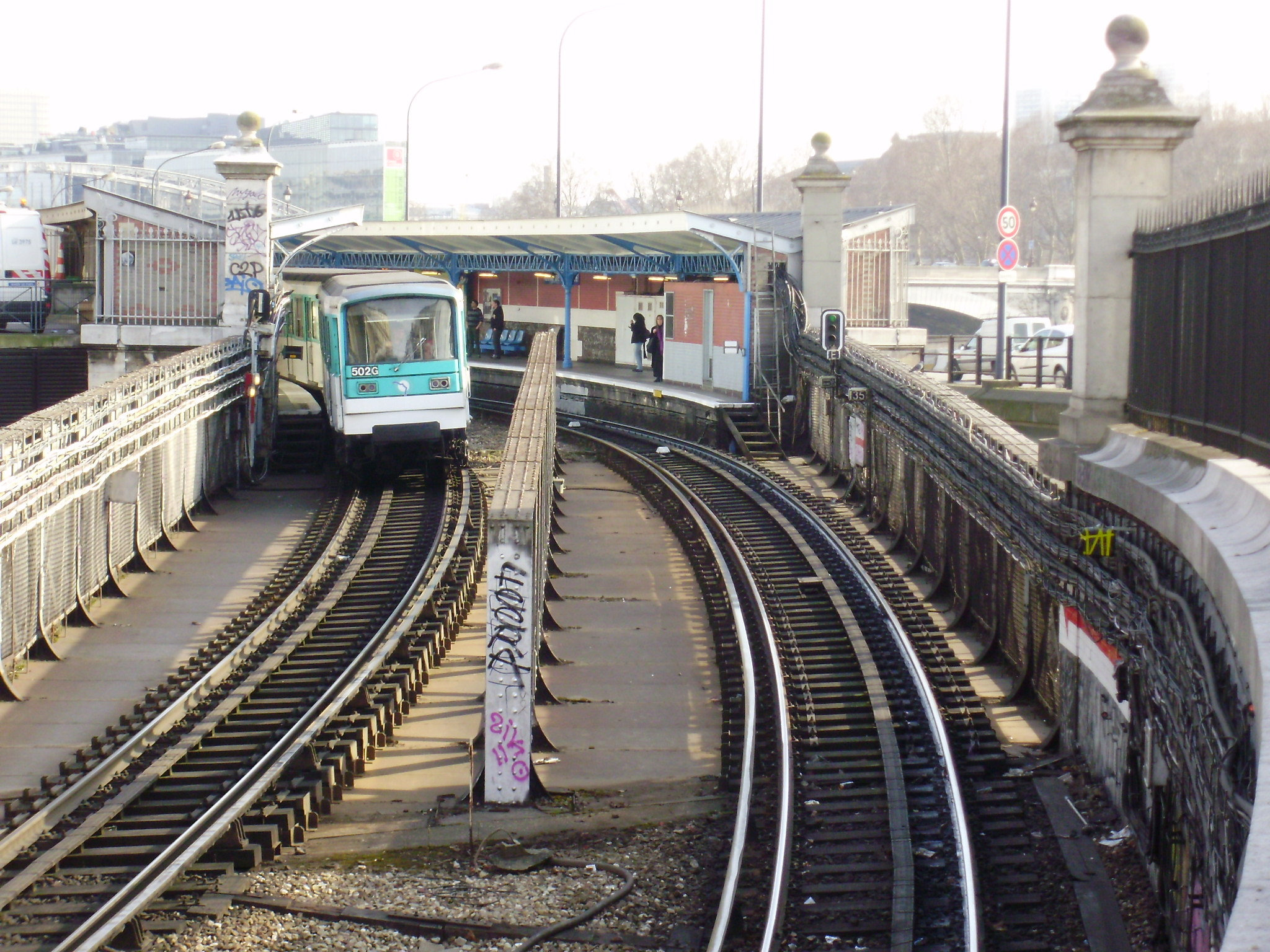
MF 67 rolling stock exiting the station and crossing the bridge over the Morland Lock.

== Additional Sources ==
- Roland, Gérard (2003). Stations de métro. D'Abbesses à Wagram. Éditions Bonneton.
- CPArama, “Le Métropolitain de Paris - Ligne 5,” page 2, has early 20th century postcards of the metro in the Place Mazas area, paired with contemporary photos of the same locations.
