= Adèle Dupuis =

French actress (1789–1847)

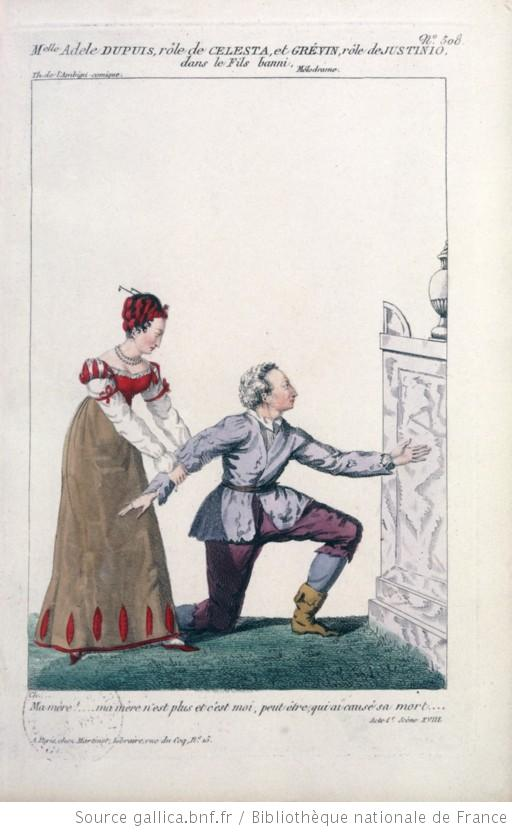
- Adèle Dupuis in Le Fils banni at the Théâtre de l'Ambigu-Comique
- Born: 6 December 1789
- Died: 14 May 1847 (aged 57)

Adèle Dupuis, born Antoinette Nicole Dupuis (December 6, 1789 – May 14, 1847) was a French stage actress. She achieved her greatest successes at the Ambigu-Comique and Gaîté.

== Biography ==
Adèle Dupuis was born Antoinette Nicole Dupuis in Paris, France, on December 6, 1789.

Dupuis (sometimes spelled Dupuy, depending on the context) entered the Paris Conservatory of Music in 1799, where she studied in Louis-Auguste Richer's singing class until 1801. In 1800 and 1801, she also attended the classes of Dugazon and Lasuze, teachers of declamatory singing. In this class, she met Louis Nourrit and Alexandre Valbrun. Their son, Alexis Valbrun, would be her godson on 3 January 1803.

She had a child in 1812, Édouard Robert Guillaume Dupuis, of unknown father, who died at four months old, followed by another son also named Édouard Robert Guillaume (1813–1850), again of unknown father, who became a painter. She died in Paris on May 14, 1847, seventeen years after retiring from the stage.

== Career ==
She began her career at the Mareux Theatre, Rue Saint-Antoine, one of the many stages in Paris at the time of the revolution, which later disappeared under the Empire. After the closure of this theatre, she was hired at the Ambigu-Comique to play lead roles in melodramas. "Pretty, decent, distinguished, endowed with an expressive face and a voice full of sensitivity, Mlle. Dupuis proved to have very serious talent."

She experienced great success at the Ambigu in roles such as L'Enfant de l'amour, Elvérine de Wertheim, Amélasis, La Mendiante, Pharamond, Irza, Les Amis du Mogol, and others. Beautiful and talented, she had many admirers. "She was the most elegantly dressed woman in Paris, to such an extent that fashionable women came to the theatre specifically to take lessons in style from her."

In 1817, she left the Ambigu-Comique for the Gaîté, where success followed. There, she performed in numerous plays, including Bouton de rose, La Fille de l'exilé, Pascal Paoli, Le Château de Lochleven, Polder ou le Bourreau d'Amsterdam, L'Aigle des Pyrénées, and La Tête de mort.

She became the queen of melodrama at the Théâtre de la Gaîté (rue Papin). "There is not a single resident of the Marais whom she hasn’t moved to tears. She is so absorbed in her roles that her eyes are often flooded with tears." For over twenty years, Adèle Dupuis was the idol of the Parisian public. In 1829, it was written, "Mlle. Dupuis has been playing young girls for so long that another actress in her place would now be seen as a grandmother. But this is not the case for her, as she continues to play ingénues, much to the satisfaction of the regulars at the Gaîté, where she cried in her youth, continues to cry in her mature age, and will probably cry... always." At the time, she was 49 years old. She was depicted in many engravings of the plays she performed in.

== Theatre ==
=== Career at the Théâtre de l'Ambigu-Comique ===
- 1808: Elvérine de Wertheim, melodrama by Auguste Lamey: Elvérine
- 1809: La Fille mendiante, melodrama by Corsse and Jean-Guillaume-Augustin Cuvelier: Stephana
- 1810: Irza or Les Conjurés à Tescuco, melodrama by Auguste Lamey: Irza
- 1811: Amélasis ou Amour et ambition, melodrama by Hubert: Thomira
- 1811: Le Baron de Felsheim, melodrama by Alexandre Bernos:
- 1813: L'Enfant de l'amour, melodrama by Louis-Charles Caigniez:
- 1813: Palmerin ou Le Solitaire des Gaules, melodrama by Victor: Olora
- 1813: Archambaud, melodrama by Leblanc: Emma
- 1815: Amour, honneur et devoir ou Le Rapt, melodrama by Pierre-Joseph Charrin: Elvire
- 1815: Le Fils banni, melodrama by Frédéric Dupetit-Méré: Célesta
- 1815: L'An 1835 ou L'Enfant d'un Cosaque, melodrama by Victor: Sophie
