= Boulevard Beaumarchais =

Boulevard in Paris, France

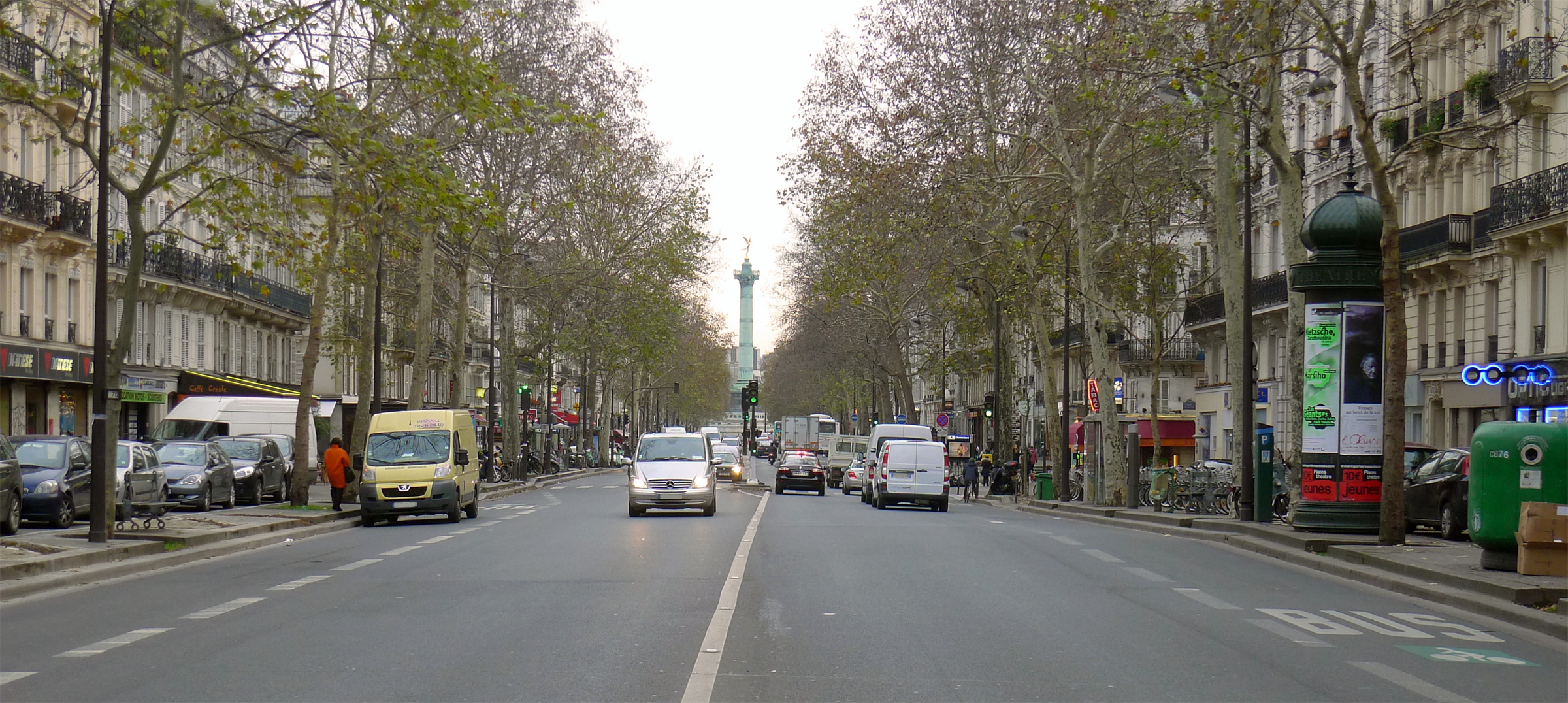
- Former name(s): Boulevard Saint-Antoine
- Namesake: Pierre-Augustin Caron de Beaumarchais
- Length: 759 yd (694 m)
- Width: 116 ft (35 m)
- Location: Paris, France
- Coordinates: 48.8571°N 2.3681°E

The Boulevard Beaumarchais (French pronunciation: [bulvaʁ bomaʁʃɛ]) is a boulevard of the 3rd, 4th and 11th arrondissement of Paris and the longest of the Grands Boulevards. The boulevard is around 700 meters long and 35 meters wide. It was originally named the Boulevard Saint-Antoine but had its name changed in 1831 to honor Pierre-Augustin Caron de Beaumarchais, whose mansion was built on the boulevard in 1780. The mansion was later seized by the government and demolished in 1818 in order to expand the Canal Saint-Martin. The boulevard was renovated in the 1980s.
