= Jacques Bonsergent station =

Metro station in Paris, France

Jacques Bonsergent
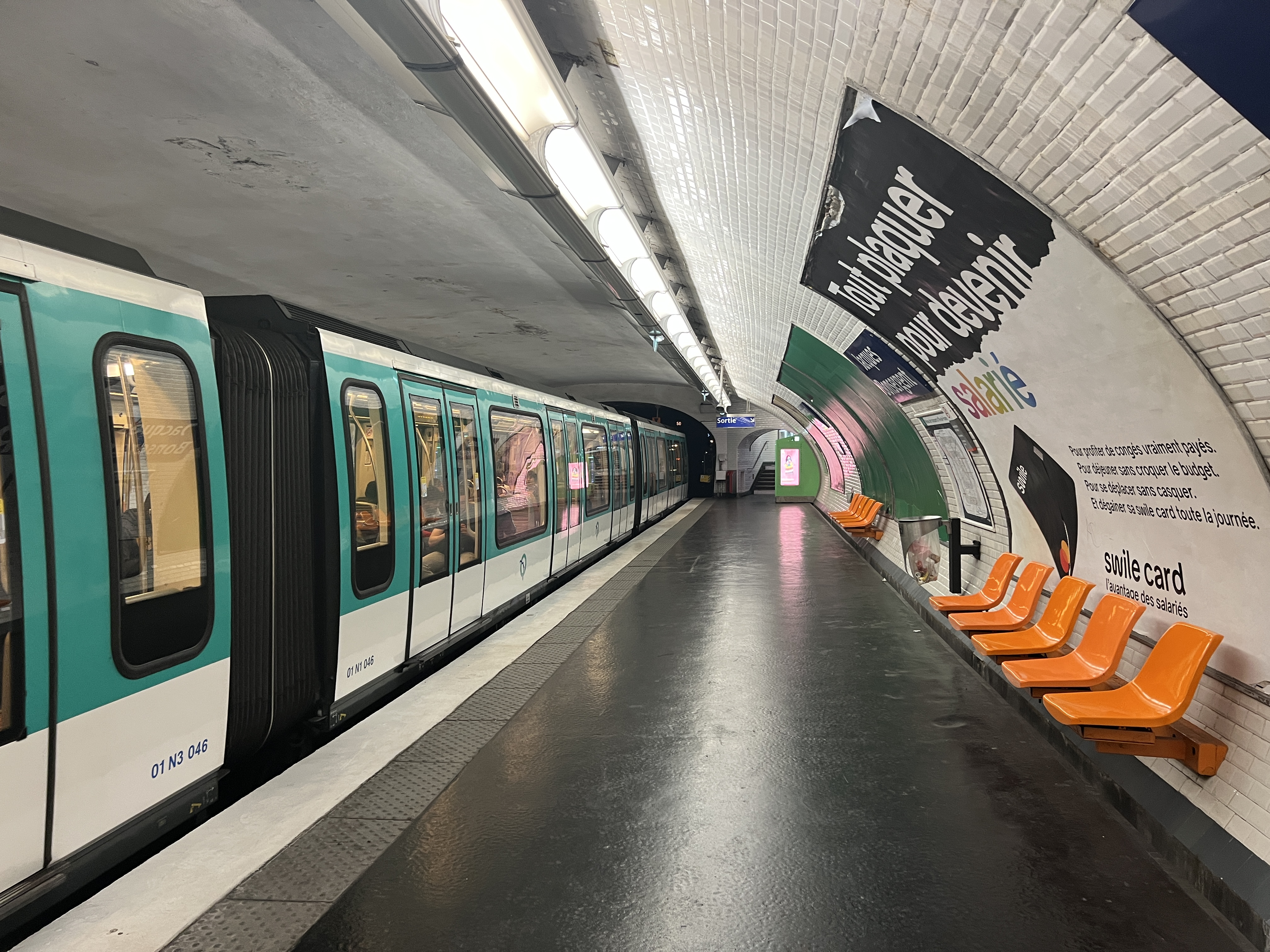

General information
- Location: 19, boul. de Magenta; 30, boul. de Magenta; 10th arrondissement of Paris; Île-de-France; France
- Coordinates: 48°52′16″N 2°21′40″E
- Owner: RATP
- Operator: RATP

Other information
- Fare zone: 1

History
- Opened: 17 December 1906

Services
| Preceding station | Paris Metro | Following station |
|---|---|---|
| République towards Place d'Italie | Line 5 | Gare de l'Est towards Bobigny–Pablo Picasso |
Location
- Location within Paris

Jacques Bonsergent (French pronunciation: [ʒak bɔ̃sɛʁʒɑ̃]) is a station of the Paris Métro, serving line 5 and located in the 10th arrondissement of Paris.

== History ==
The station was opened on 17 December 1906 as the northern terminus of Line 5 from Place d'Italie, replacing the temporary terminus of Quai de la Rapée, before the line was extended to Gare du Nord on 15 November 1907. The stations original name of Lancry is after proximity to the Rue de Lancry and its former local owner, Sieur Lancry. The station kept that name until 1946.

The current name refers to the Place Jacques Bonsergent, named after Jacques Bonsergent, an engineer who became the first Parisian (and possibly first French) civilian executed by the German occupation in 1940. Bonsergent was born at Malestroit, in 1912 and was condemned to death by a German military tribunal on 5 December 1940 after being accused, and found guilty, of an act of violence against German soldiers during the night of 10 November. The execution was carried out on 23 December 1940 at the Bois de Vincennes; the commanding officer was Général Otto von Stülpnagel. Bonsergent's remains lie in the cemetery at Malestroit, Brittany.

== Service for travellers ==
=== Access ===
The station has two access points, each consisting of a fixed staircase:

- Access 1 - Boulevard de Magenta / Place Jacques-Bonsergent - embellished with a mast with a yellow "M" in a circle;
- Access 2 - cnr. Rue de Lancry / Boulevard de Magenta, adorned with a Dervaux candelabrum.

=== Station layout ===
Street Level

| B1 | Mezzanine for platform connection |

| Line 5 platforms | Side platform, doors will open on the right |
| Line 5 platforms | Southbound | ← toward Place d'Italie (République) |
| Line 5 platforms | Northbound | toward Bobigny – Pablo Picasso (Gare de l'Est) → |
| Line 5 platforms | Side platform, doors will open on the right |

=== Platforms ===
Jacques Bonsergent station has a standard configuration. It has two platforms separated by the metro tracks and the vault is elliptical. The decor is the style used for most of the metro stations. The lighting strips are white and rounded in the Gaudin style of the metro revival in the 2000s, and the white ceramic tiles cover the walls, the tunnel exits, and the outlets of the corridors, while the vault is painted white. The advertising frames are metallic, and the station name is written both in Parisine typeface and in capital letters on enamelled plates. The Motte style seats are orange. Access is via the south-eastern end.

=== Bus connections ===
The station is served by lines 56 and 91 of the RATP Bus Network and, at night, by lines N01 and N02 of the Noctilien network.
