= Boulevard de l'Hôpital =

Street in Paris, France

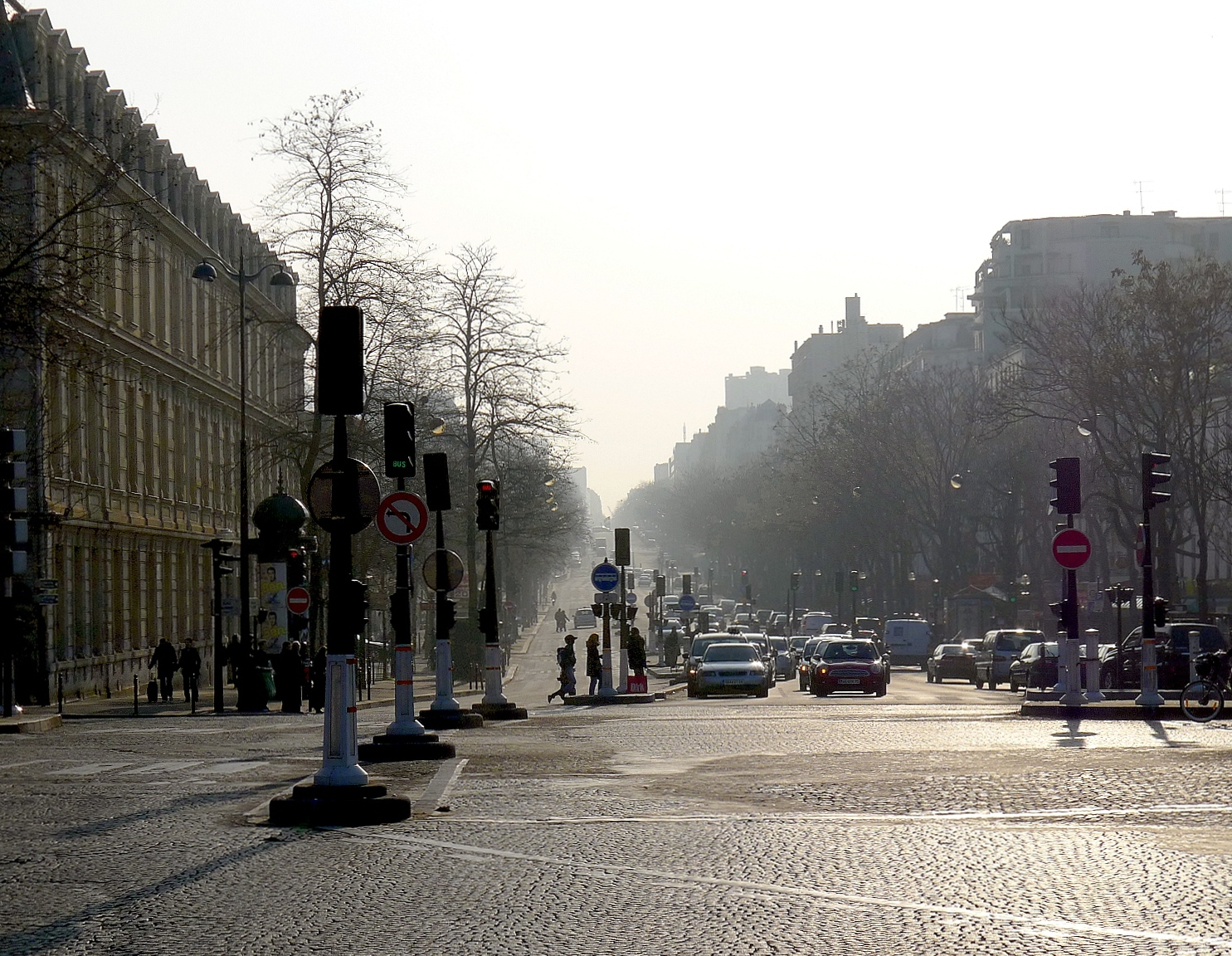
- Boulevard de l'Hôpital in 2010.

- Location within Paris
- Length: 1,395 m (4,577 ft)
- Width: 43 m (141 ft)
- Arrondissement: 13th
- Quarter: Pitié-Salpêtrière
- Coordinates: 48°50′17″N 2°21′37″E
- From: Place Valhubert
- To: Place d'Italie

Construction
- Completion: 1760
- Denomination: 9 August 1760

The Boulevard de l'Hôpital (French pronunciation: [bulvaʁ də lopital]) is a tree-lined boulevard in the 13th arrondissement of Paris, which also briefly borders on the 5th arrondissement.

It runs a distance of 1,395 meters, from the Place Valhubert at the pont d'Austerlitz, by the gare d'Austerlitz, rising in a gentle slope towards its end at the place d'Italie - the town hall of the arrondissement being located at their intersection. Along the way, it serves the Jardin des Plantes and the Hôpital de la Pitié-Salpêtrière from which it derives its name. In front of the hospital stands a statue of doctor Philippe Pinel.

The boulevard is an important traffic axis. Bordered by public and teaching establishments such as the general police station of the arrondissement, it has relatively little commercial and leisure activity excepting the shops and restaurants close to the gare d'Austerlitz.

The boulevard is also home to the Arts et Métiers ParisTech main campus. This engineering graduate school built its facilities in 1910, at this time it was called ENSAM. Nowadays, more than 950 graduate students are attending courses in fields such as industrial or mechanical engineering.

== History ==
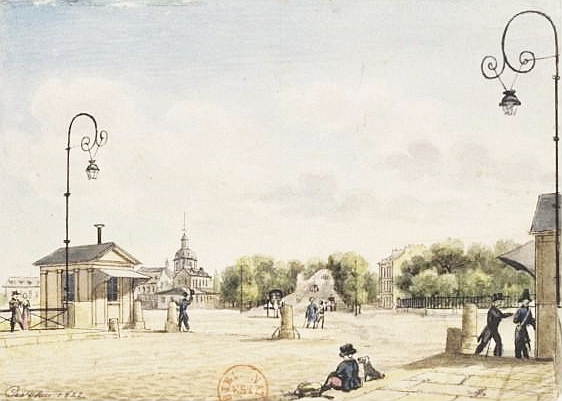
"Le boulevard de l'Hôpital et l'hôpital de la Salpêtrière à Paris"; by Christophe Civeton

The boulevard is one of the Boulevards du midi of Louis XIV, constructed to supplement the band of boulevards already completed on the right bank of the Seine. However, the work advanced very slowly and the boulevard only finally opened in 1760. It was then the start of the road to Fontainebleau, which followed the course of the present avenue d'Italie.

In the projects for the restoration of Paris in the post-war period (the 1959 town-planning directive), it was intended that the boulevard de l'Hôpital be integrated into an expressway crossing Paris from south to north, which would have joined the Boulevard Richard-Lenoir on the right bank. However, this plan was never implemented, so the layout of the boulevard has scarcely changed from the original.

== Composition ==
The odd-numbered buildings are on the Gare d'Austerlitz/Pitié-Salpêtrière (eastern) side of the boulevard and the even-numbered buildings on the opposite (western) side.

=== Odd numbers ===
- n° 1-27 : Gare d'Austerlitz
  - n° 7 : Houses L'Association pour l'histoire des chemins de fer en France (Association for the history of railways in France.)

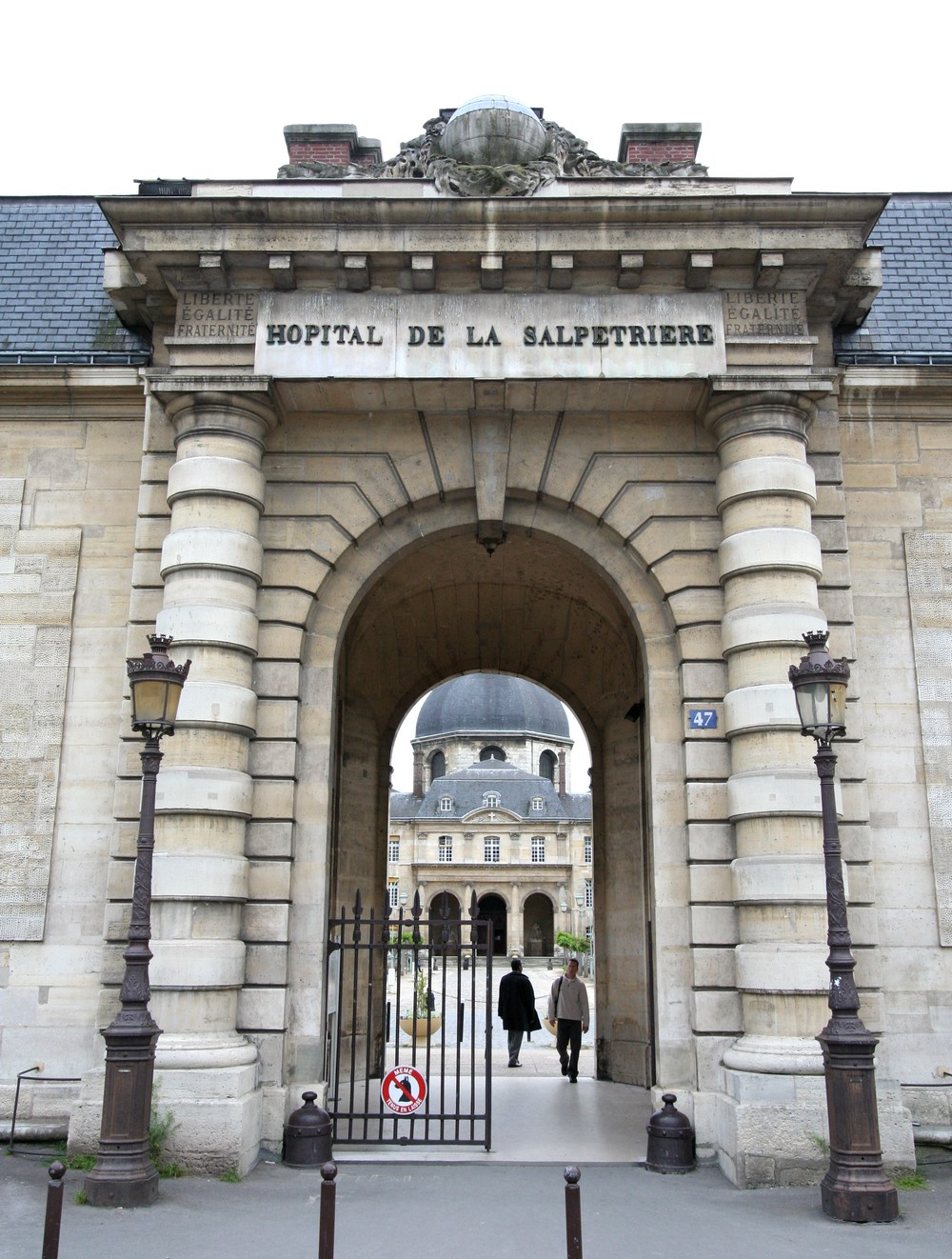
Hôpital de la Salpêtrière

- n° 47-97 : Hôpital de la Pitié-Salpêtrière
  - n° 47 : Chapelle de la Salpêtrière (Hospital Chapel), masterpiece of Libéral Bruant architect of les Invalides, built around 1675, on the model of a Greek cross. It has 4 central chapels each capable of holding a congregation of some 1,000 people. It has a central octagonal cupola illuminated by picture windows in circular arcs.
    - Also houses ARTC Association pour la Recherche sur les Tumeurs Cérébrales (Association for Research on Cerebral Tumours).
    - Occasionally houses art exhibitions. The Bombay-born British sculptor, Anish Kapoor has exhibited here.
- n° 91 and 105 : Pitié-Salpêtrière Faculty of Medicine (in French).
- n° 103/105/105B : Centre Hospitalier Universitaire.
- n° 149-155 : Arts et Métiers ParisTech (ENSAM)
  - n° 151 :Underground Amphitheater of Arts et Métiers ParisTech - a reinforced concrete thin-shell structure built in 1960–1961 which has been shown at the Museum of Modern Art, as part of the programme devoted to 20th Century Engineering. Underground Amphitheater of the Ecole Nationale d'Ingénieurs des Arts et Métiers at Structurae.
- n° 159 : Primary School.

=== Even numbers ===
- n° 50-52 : The fictional maison Gorbeau in Book 4 (La masure Gorbeau , Gorbeau's hovel) of Victor Hugo's Les Misérables.
- n° 56 : AOF Association des Optométristes de France (Association of French Optometrists).
- n° 66 : Annex of the préfecture of police, which was captured at midnight on 25 August 1958 by FLN commandos, controlled by Mohand Ouramdane Saâdaoui and Mohammed Mezrara (also known as "Hamada"). Of the four policemen guarding the building, three were killed and the fourth seriously wounded.
- n° 80 : Saint Marcel was buried in a funerary basilica destroyed at the beginning of the 19th century. The modern Roman Catholic church of Saint-Marcel (in French) at n° 80 - 82 was built around 1960 some 500 m from the site of the basilica. It has a triangular campanile built in 1995 and underneath is the Sainte-Genevière chapel and an American oratory. It has a 1967 Beuchet-debierre organ (in French).
- n° 82 : Coptic Orthodox church of Saint Marcel
- n° 106-112 : Sorbonne Economics Center, research centers in economics, statistics and mathematical economics (in French)
- n° 144 : Police Commissariat for the 13th arrondissement.

== Trivia ==
- Boulevard De L'hôpital is the title of Track 11 of Les Créatures by the French artist Philippe Katerine (links in French).

== Stations ==
The Métro Line 5 runs through the Austerlitz viaduct on the northern section of the boulevard. Line 5 has four stations:

- Gare d'Austerlitz (at its northern end), on the Viaduc d'Austerlitz
- Saint-Marcel (opposite Hôpital de la Pitié-Salpêtrière), underground
- Campo Formio, underground
- Place d'Italie (at its southern end), underground
