= Richard-Lenoir station =

Metro station in Paris, France

Richard-Lenoir
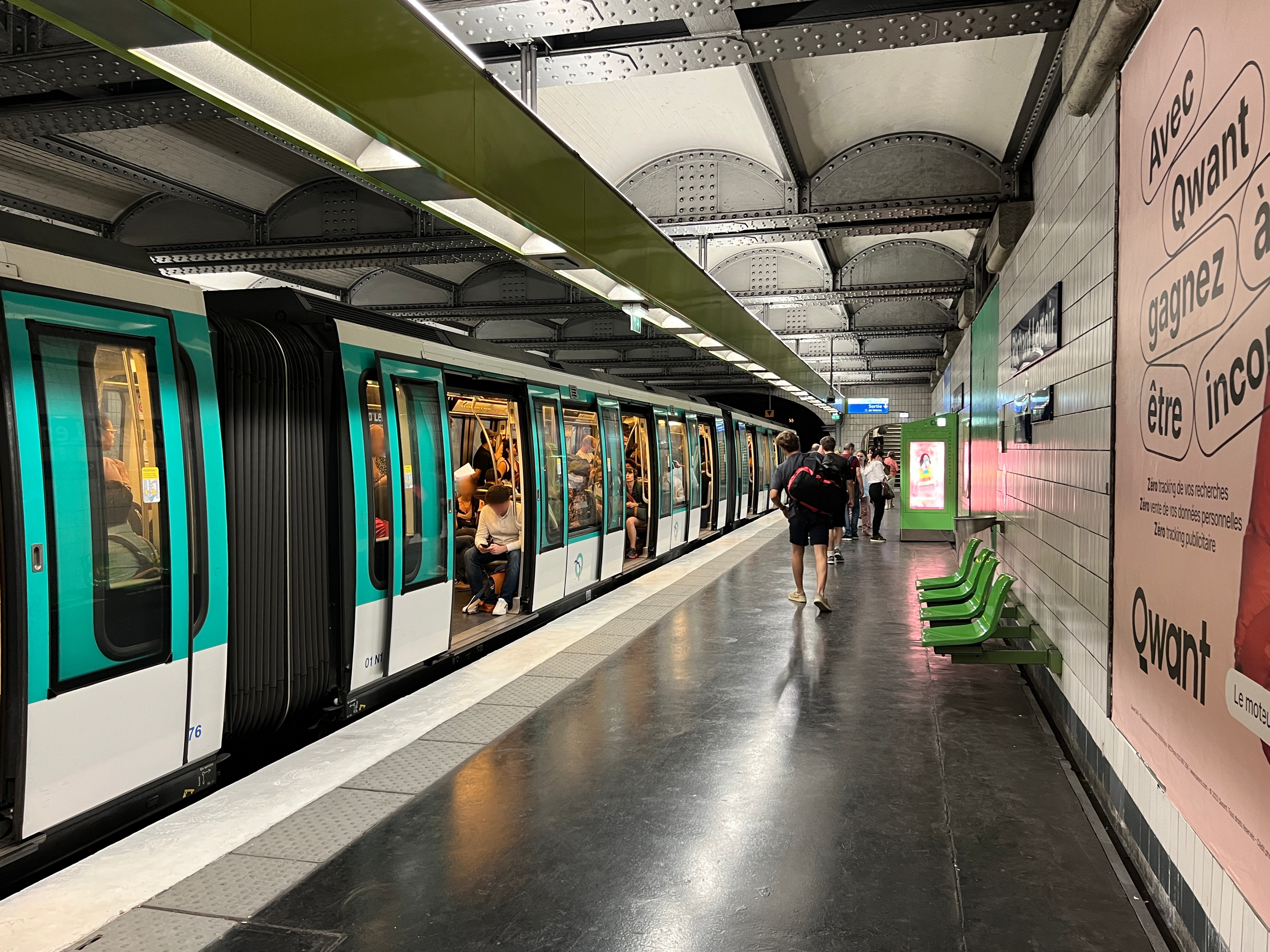
- Station view

General information
- Location: 65, Boul. Richard-Lenoir; 11th arrondissement of Paris; Île-de-France; France
- Coordinates: 48°51′36″N 2°22′19″E
- System: Paris Métro station
- Owner: RATP
- Operator: RATP
- Line: Paris Metro Paris Metro Line 5
- Platforms: 2 (side platforms)
- Tracks: 2

Construction
- Accessible: no

Other information
- Fare zone: 1

History
- Opened: 17 December 1906

Services
Preceding station	Paris Metro	Following station
Bréguet–Sabin towards Place d'Italie	Line 5	Oberkampf towards Bobigny–Pablo Picasso
Location
- Location within Paris

Richard-Lenoir (French pronunciation: [ʁiʃaʁ lənwaʁ]) is a station on Line 5 of the Paris Métro, located in the 11th arrondissement.

== Location ==
The station is located under Boulevard Richard-Lenoir, alongside the covered Canal Saint-Martin, near Allée Verte and Rue Pelée.

== History ==
It opened on 17 December 1906, as part of the extension of Line 5 from Place Mazas (now Quai de la Rapée) to Lancry (today Jacques Bonsergent). The name refers to Boulevard Richard-Lenoir, named after the industrialist François Richard (1765–1839) who went by the name Richard-Lenoir after the death of his business partner Joseph Lenoir-Dufresne. It saw 2,172,035 passengers entering the station in 2018, which places it in 247th position for attendance out of 302 metro stations.

== Services for travellers ==
=== Access ===
The station has two accesses, all of which consist of fixed stairs:

- access 1 - cnr. 65 Boulevard Richard-Lenoir / Rue Gaby-Sylvia, entrance designed by Hector Guimard is a registered as a historical monument since May 29, 1978;
- access 2 - cnr. Boulevard Richard-Lenoir / Rue Rue Pelée.

=== Station layout ===
Street Level

B1	Mezzanine for platform connection

Line 5 platforms	Side platform, doors will open on the right
Line 5 platforms	Southbound	← toward Place d'Italie (Bréguet–Sabin)
Line 5 platforms	Northbound	toward Bobigny–Pablo Picasso (Oberkampf) →
Line 5 platforms	Side platform, doors will open on the right

=== Platforms ===
Richard-Lenoir station has a standard configuration. It has two platforms separated by the metro tracks. Established on the ground floor, the ceiling consists of a metal deck, whose beams, silver coloured, are supported by vertical walls. The platforms are in the Andreu-Motte style with a yellow light rail and green Motte seats. The tunnel exits and walls are provided with flat white tiles organised vertically. The advertising frames are metallic, and the name of the station is of Parisine typeface on enamelled plate.

=== Bus connections ===
The station does not have a connection with the RATP Bus Network.
