= Campo Formio station =

Metro station in Paris, France

Campo Formio
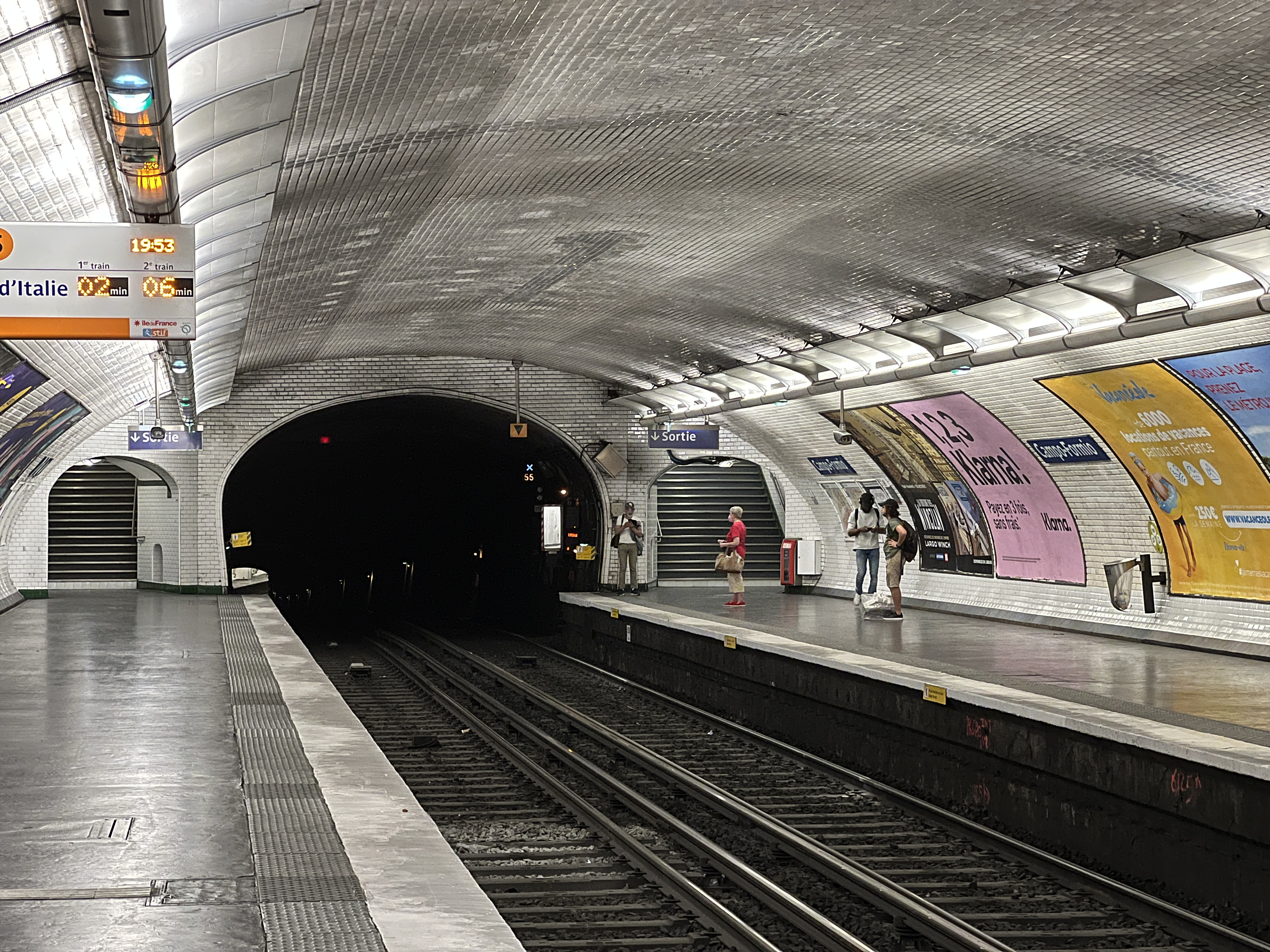

General information
- Location: 106/112, Boul. de l'Hôpital; 13th arrondissement of Paris; Île-de-France; France
- Coordinates: 48°50′06″N 2°21′29″E
- Owner: RATP
- Operator: RATP

Other information
- Fare zone: 1

History
- Opened: 2 June 1906

Services
Preceding station	Paris Metro	Following station
Place d'Italie Terminus	Line 5	Saint-Marcel towards Bobigny–Pablo Picasso
Location
- Location within Paris

Campo Formio (French pronunciation: [kɑ̃po fɔʁmjo]) is a station on Line 5 of the Paris Métro, located in the 13th arrondissement of Paris, under the Boulevard de l'Hôpital.

== History ==
The station opened on 6 June 1906. The name refers to neighbouring Rue de Campo-Formio, named for the Treaty of Campo Formio signed in 1797 between France and Austria. France obtained Belgium, part of the left bank of the Rhine, the Ionian Islands, as well as the recognition of the Cisalpine Republic. German bombing in World War I damaged the station in 1918.

During the summer of 2007, the station was the provisional terminus of Line 5 following the closure of the platforms at the Place d'Italie station and the construction of the Boucle d'Italie.

In 2018, 1,369,978 travellers entered the station which placed it at 285th position of Métro stations for its attendance.

== Location ==
The station is located under the Boulevard de l'Hôpital on the corner of the Rue de Campo-Formio.

== Passenger services ==
=== Station layout ===
Street Level

B1	Mezzanine for platform connection

Line 5 platforms	Side platform, doors will open on the right
Line 5 platforms	Southbound	← toward Place d'Italie (Terminus)
Line 5 platforms	Northbound	toward Bobigny–Pablo Picasso (Saint-Marcel) →
Line 5 platforms	Side platform, doors will open on the right

=== Platforms ===
Campo-Formio metro station has a standard configuration. It has two platforms separated by metro tracks and the roof is elliptical. The decor is the style used for the majority of metro stations, the lighting strips are white and rounded in the Gaudin style of the metro revival of the 2000s, and the bevelled white ceramic tiles cover the walls, the roof and the tunnel exits. The advertising frames are metallic and the name of the station is in Parisine font on enamelled plate. It is one of the few stations without seating arrangements.

=== Bus connections ===
The station is served by Lines 57 and 67 of the RATP Bus Network.

== Gallery ==
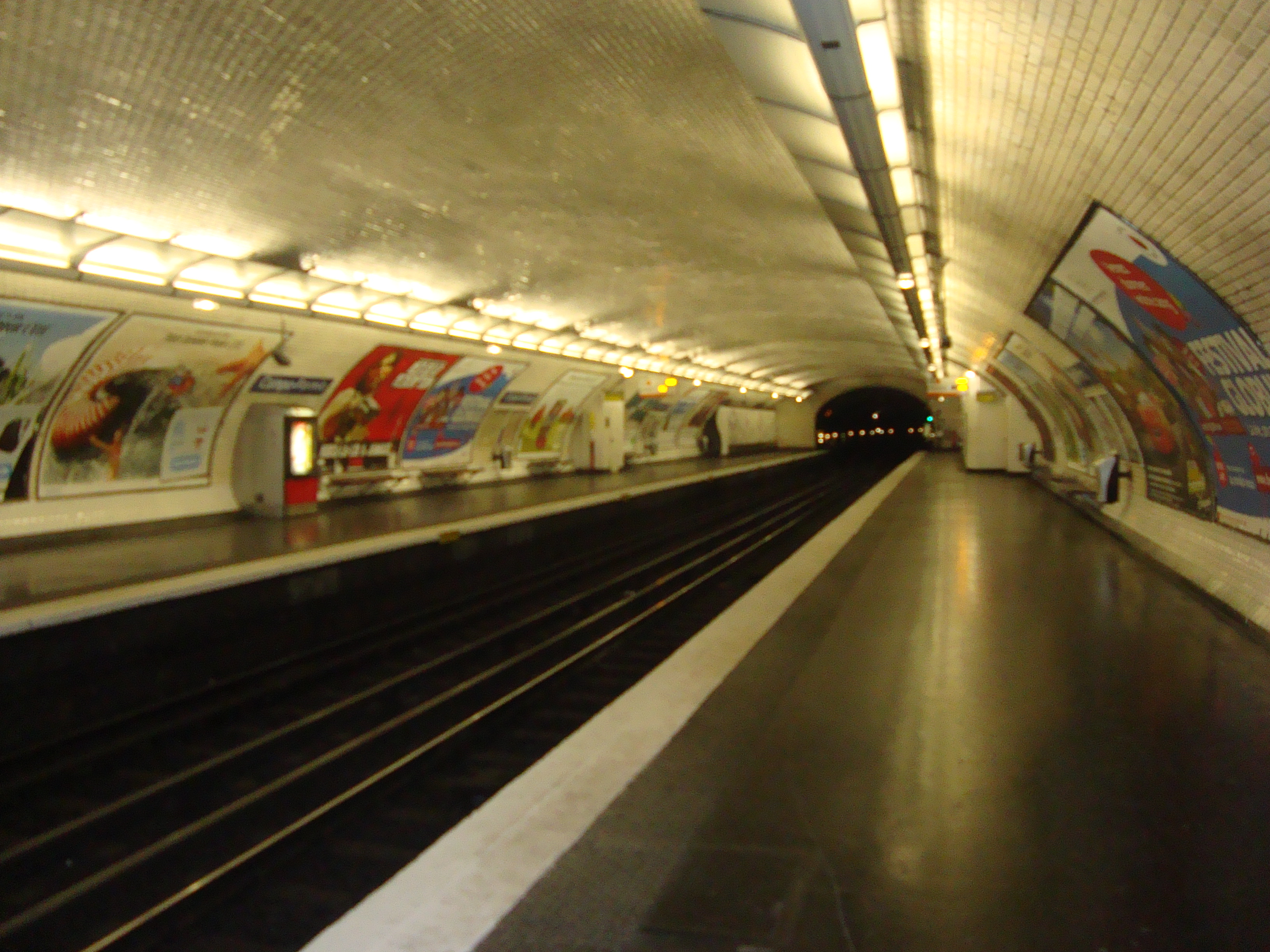
Line 5 platforms at Campo Formio

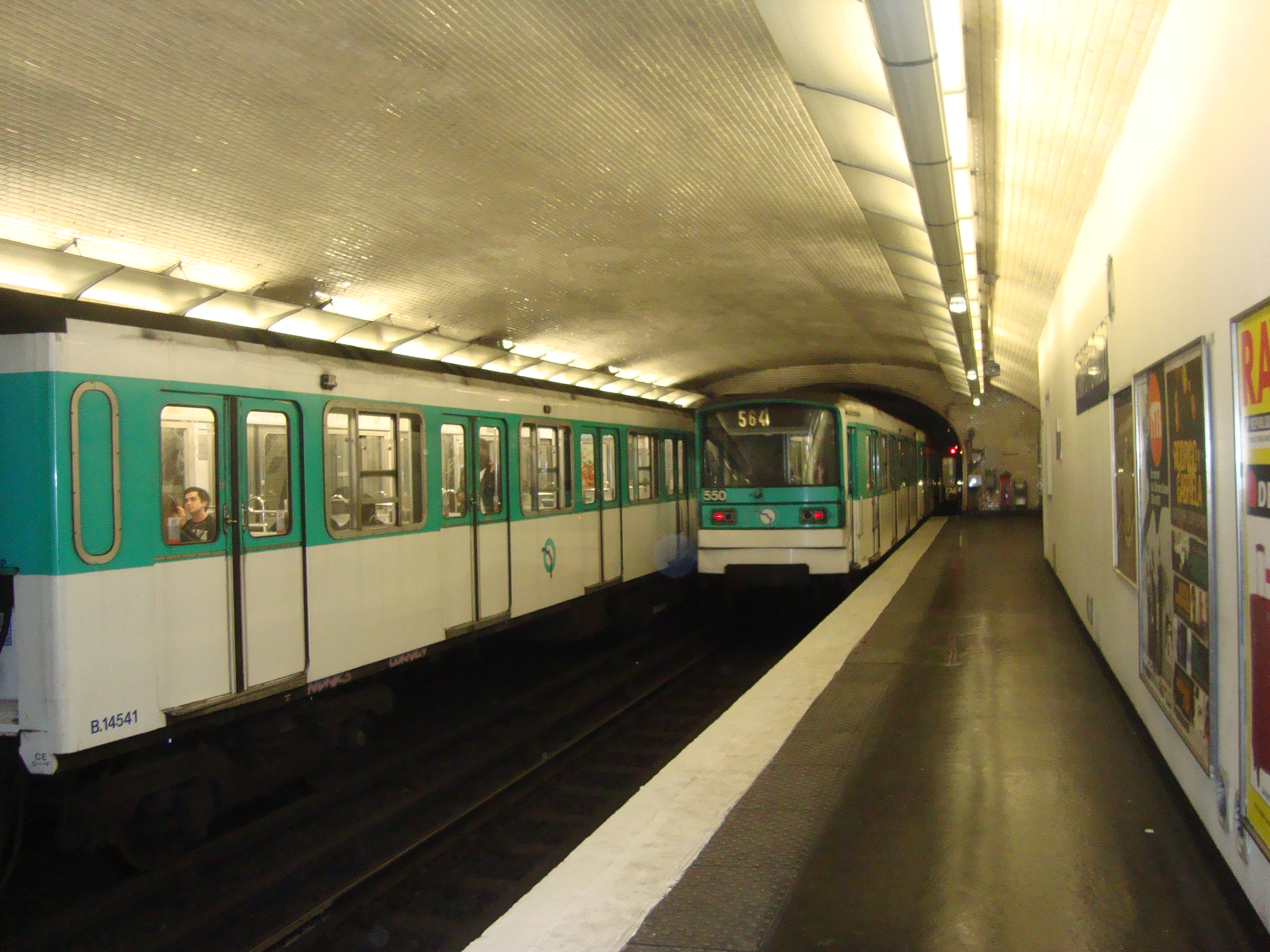
MF 67 rolling stock on Line 5 at Campo Formio
