= Saint-Marcel station =

Metro station in Paris, France

Saint-Marcel
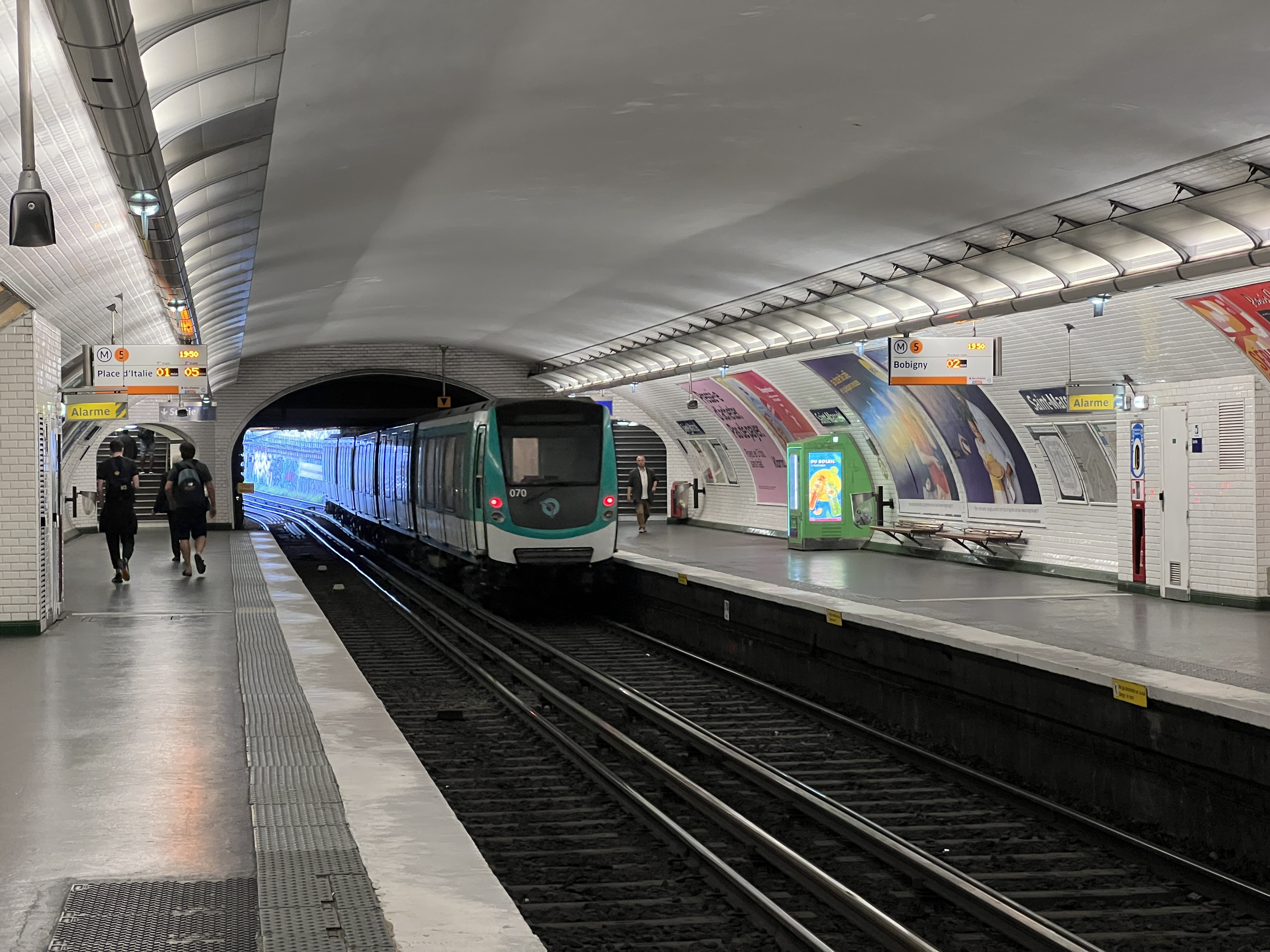

General information
- Location: 50, Boul. de l'Hôpital; Boul. de l'Hôpital × Rue des Wallons; 13th arrondissement of Paris; Île-de-France; France
- Coordinates: 48°50′17″N 2°21′36″E
- System: Paris Métro station
- Owner: RATP
- Operator: RATP

Other information
- Fare zone: 1

History
- Opened: 2 June 1906

Services
Preceding station	Paris Metro	Following station
Campo Formio towards Place d'Italie	Line 5	Gare d'Austerlitz towards Bobigny–Pablo Picasso
Location
- Location within Paris

Saint-Marcel (French pronunciation: [sɛ̃ maʁsɛl]) is a station on Line 5 of the Paris Métro, located in the 13th arrondissement of Paris, under the Boulevard de l'Hôpital.

== Location ==
The station is located under the Boulevard de l'Hôpital, south of the intersection of the Rue des Wallons. It is the first underground station for southbound passengers after Gare d'Austerlitz. The station serves Pitié-Salpêtrière Hospital.

== History ==
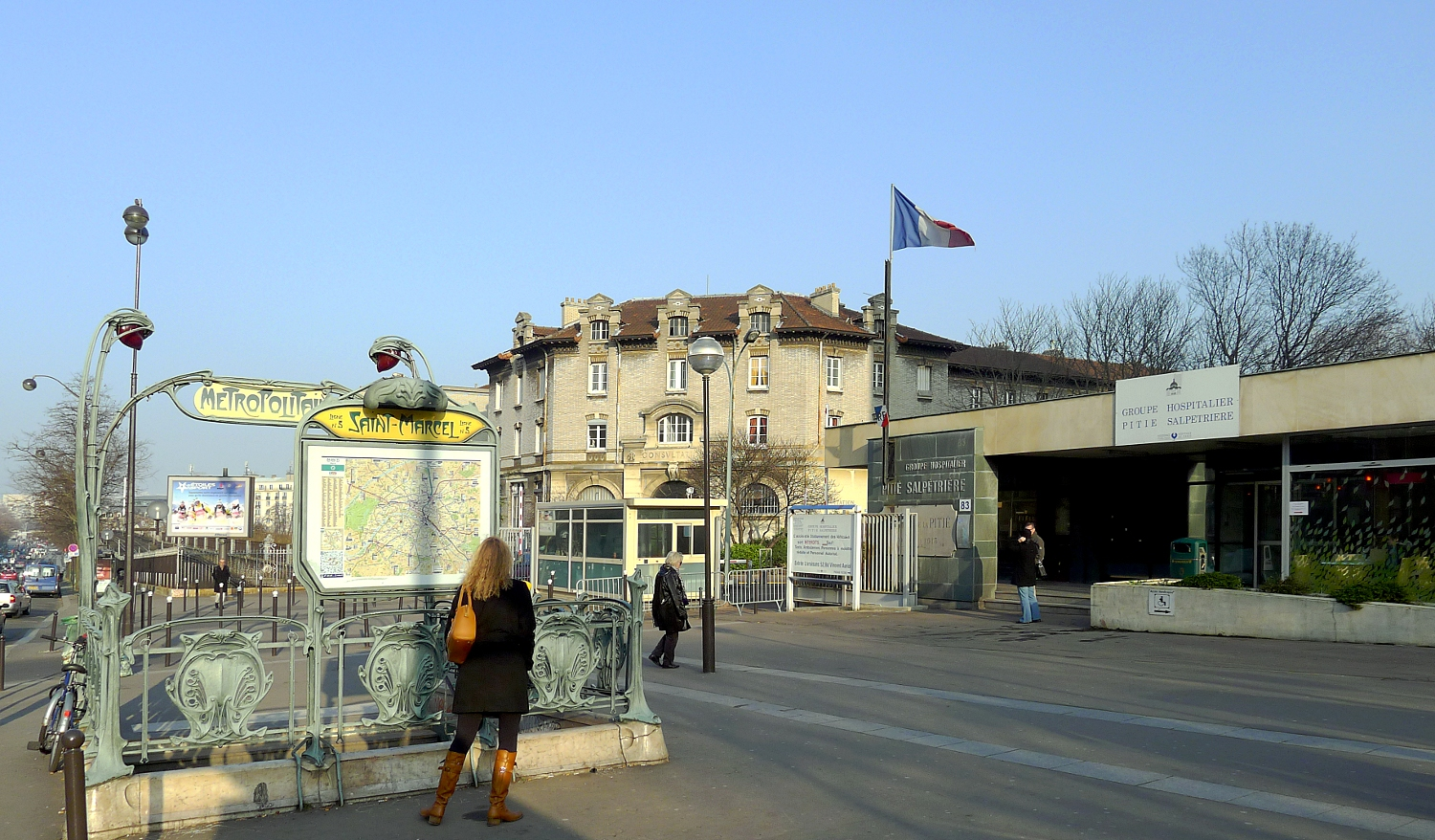
The station, in front of the entrance to Pitié-Salpêtrière Hospital

The station was opened on 2 June 1906 with the commissioning of the first section of Line 5 between Gare d'Orléans (now Gare d'Austerlitz) and Place d'Italie.

It owes its name to its proximity to the beginning of Boulevard Saint-Marcel, named for a 5th-century bishop of Paris, who died in 436 and was famous for his mythical miracles. He rescued Paris from a monstrous dragon, changed the water of the Seine into wine, as well as converted pagans.

In 2018, 2,286,932 travellers entered the station which placed it at 240th position of Métro stations for its attendance.

== Passenger services ==
=== Access ===
The station has two accesses consisting of fixed stairs opening on either side of the Boulevard de l'Hôpital:

- Access 1: Boulevard de l'Hôpital – La Pitié-Salpêtrière, adorned with a Guimard edicule, now a historical monument (decreed on 12 February 2016), is on the right of the No. 83, which is one of the entrances to Pitié-Salpêtrière Hospital;
- Access 2: Rue des Wallons, embellished with a mast with a yellow "M" in a circle, located opposite No. 50 on the boulevard.

=== Station layout ===
Street Level

B1	Mezzanine for platform connection

Line 5 platforms	Side platform, doors will open on the right
Line 5 platforms	Southbound	← toward Place d'Italie (Campo Formio)
Line 5 platforms	Northbound	toward Bobigny–Pablo Picasso (Gare d'Austerlitz) →
Line 5 platforms	Side platform, doors will open on the right

=== Platforms ===
Saint-Marcel metro station is of a standard configuration. It has two platforms separated by metro tracks and the roof is elliptical. The decor is the style used for the majority of metro stations. The lighting strips are white and rounded in the Gaudin style of the metro revival of the 2000s, and the white ceramic tiles bevelled on the sides, the tunnel exits and the outlets of the corridors. The vault is coated and painted white. The advertising frames are white ceramic and the name of the station is written in the Parisine type font on enamelled plates. The platforms are equipped with wooden slat benches.

=== Bus connections ===
The station is served by Lines 57 and 91 of the RATP Bus Network and, at night, by the N31 line of the Noctilien network.

== Nearby ==
- Jardin des plantes
- Grand Mosque of Paris
- Pitié-Salpêtrière Hospital
- Campus Pitié-Salpêtrière

== Culture ==
One of the station's entrances is visible in a scene in the first moments of Claude Autant-Lara's film The Traversée de Paris.
