= Bréguet–Sabin station =

Metro station in Paris, France

Bréguet–Sabin
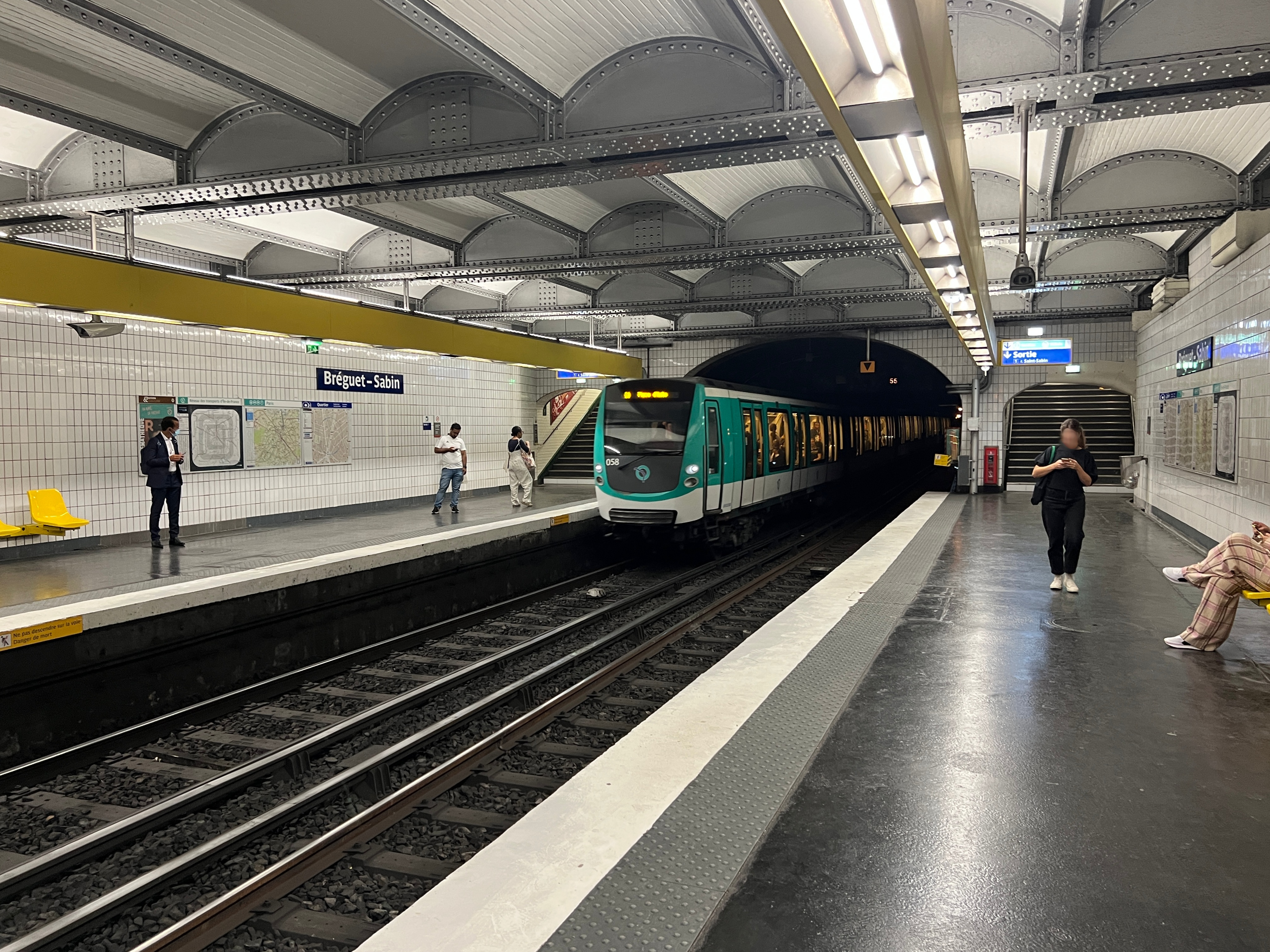

General information
- Location: 21, Boul. Richard-Lenoir; 11th arrondissement of Paris; Île-de-France; France
- Coordinates: 48°51′22″N 2°22′12″E
- System: Paris Métro station
- Owner: RATP
- Operator: RATP
- Line: Paris Metro Paris Metro Line 5
- Platforms: 2 (side platforms)
- Tracks: 2

Construction
- Accessible: no

Other information
- Fare zone: 1

History
- Opened: 31 December 1906

Services
Preceding station	Paris Metro	Following station
Bastille towards Place d'Italie	Line 5	Richard-Lenoir towards Bobigny–Pablo Picasso
Location
- Location within Paris

Bréguet–Sabin (French pronunciation: [bʁeɡɛ sabɛ̃]) is a station on Line 5 of the Paris Métro, located in the 11th arrondissement.

== Location ==
The station is located under Boulevard Richard-Lenoir, along the covered Canal Saint-Martin, close to Rue Bréguet and Rue Saint-Sabin, between the Richard-Lenoir and Bastille Métro stations.

== History ==
The station name pays tribute to the Breguet family, including the Swiss-born watchmaker Abraham Breguet (1747–1823), who invented watches with automatic winding for astronomy. His grandson Louis Breguet (1804–1883) invented electrical and radio-telegraphic apparatus and collaborated with Claude Chappe. Later, his great-grandson Antoine (1851–1882) developed an electric anemometer. The sons of the latter, pioneers of aviation, Jacques and the famous Louis Charles Breguet (1880–1955) were the builders of the aircraft piloted by Dieudonné Costes and Maurice Bellonte who crossed the Atlantic from east to west in 1930. The name of the station is also a tribute to Angelesme de Saint-Sabin, who was a city councillor of Paris in 1777. The station was opened on 31 December 1906.

The station saw 2,351,237 passengers enter it in 2018, placing it in 233rd position out of 302 Métro stations.

== Services for passengers ==
=== Access ===
The station has two entrances with stairs leading to each end of the platform, located on Boulevard Richard-Lenoir.

- access 1 – cnr. 21 Boulevard Richard-Lenoir / Rue Saint-Sabin, its entrance ironwork decorated by Hector Guimard;
- access 2 – cnr. 9 Boulevard Richard-Lenoir / Rue de Pasteur Wagner, has a simple decoration in the same style.

=== Station layout ===
Street Level

B1	Mezzanine for platform connection

Line 5 platforms	Side platform, doors will open on the right
Line 5 platforms	Southbound	← toward Place d'Italie (Bastille)
Line 5 platforms	Northbound	toward Bobigny–Pablo Picasso (Richard-Lenoir) →
Line 5 platforms	Side platform, doors will open on the right

== Platforms ==
Breguet–Sabin is a standard configuration station. It has two platforms separated by the metro tracks. The ceiling consists of a metal deck, whose silver beams, are supported by vertical walls. The platforms are in the Andreu-Motte style with a yellow luminous rail and yellow Motte seats. The spandrels and walls have flat white tiles aligned and placed vertically. The advertising frames are metallic and the name of the station is in Parisine typeface on enamelled plates.

=== Bus connections ===
The station is served by line 69 of the RATP Bus Network.

== Gallery ==
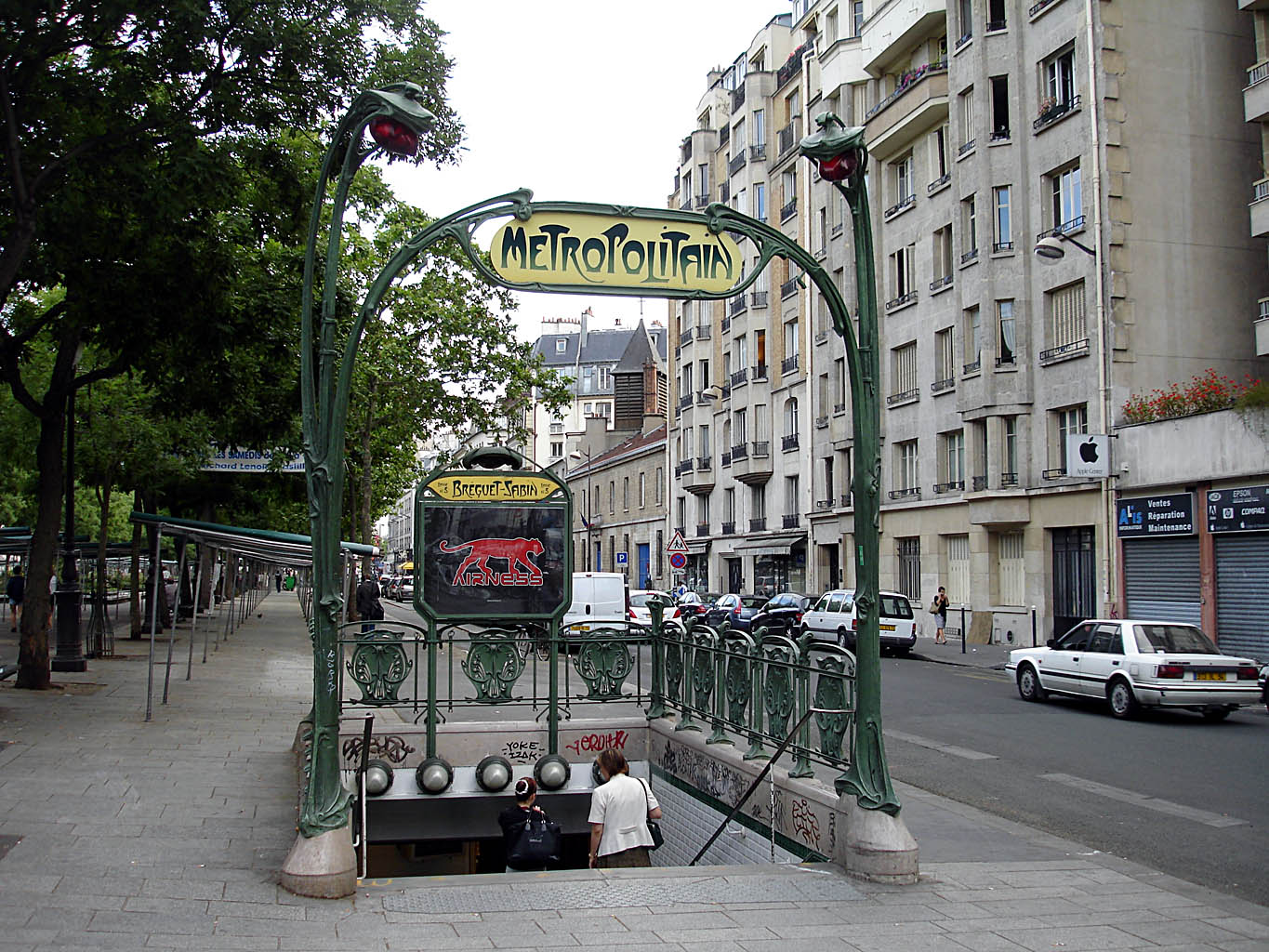
Street-level entrance at Bréguet–Sabin

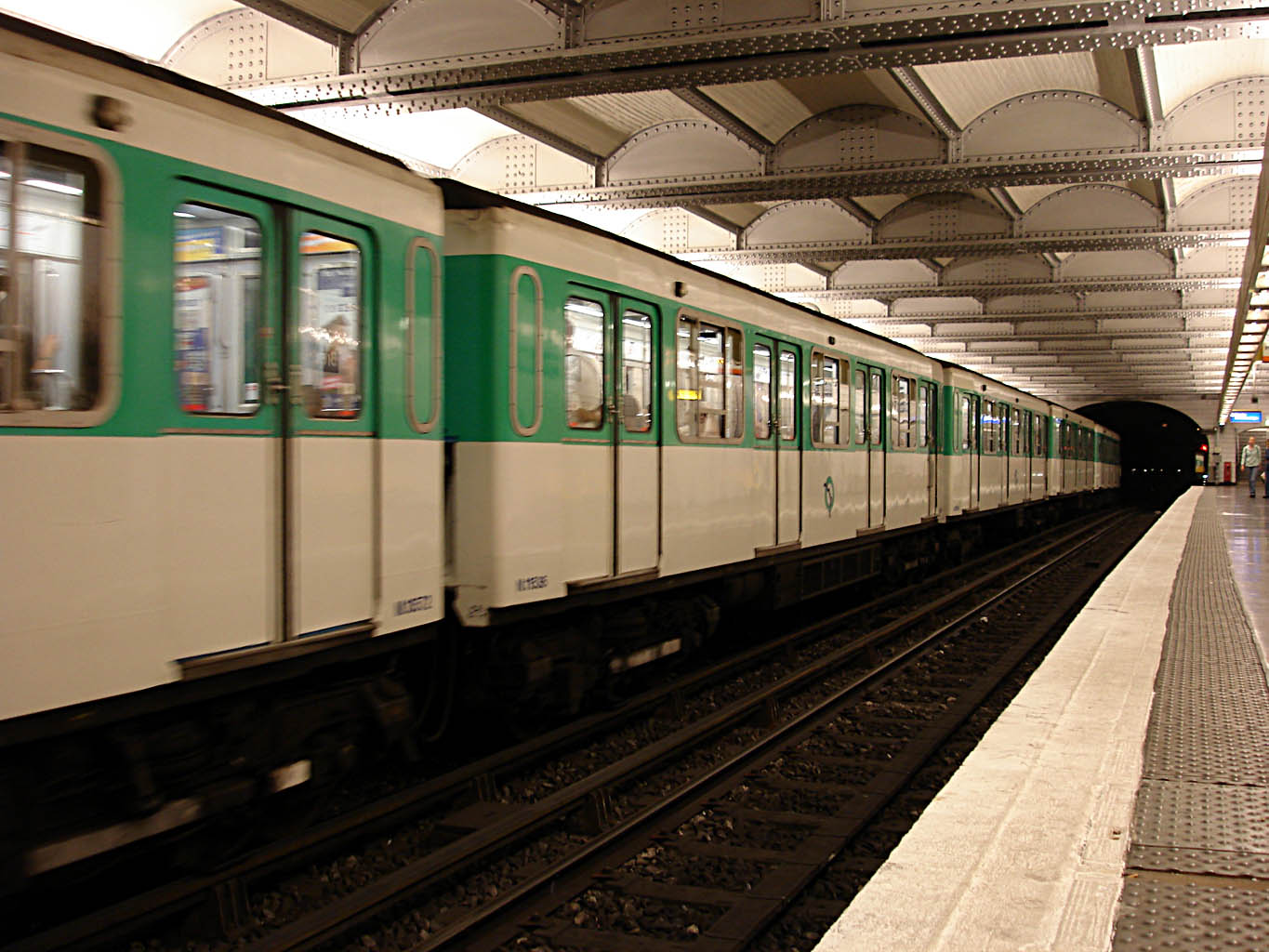
MF 67 rolling stock on Line 5 at Bréguet–Sabin
