= Boulevard Richard-Lenoir =

Boulevard in Paris, France

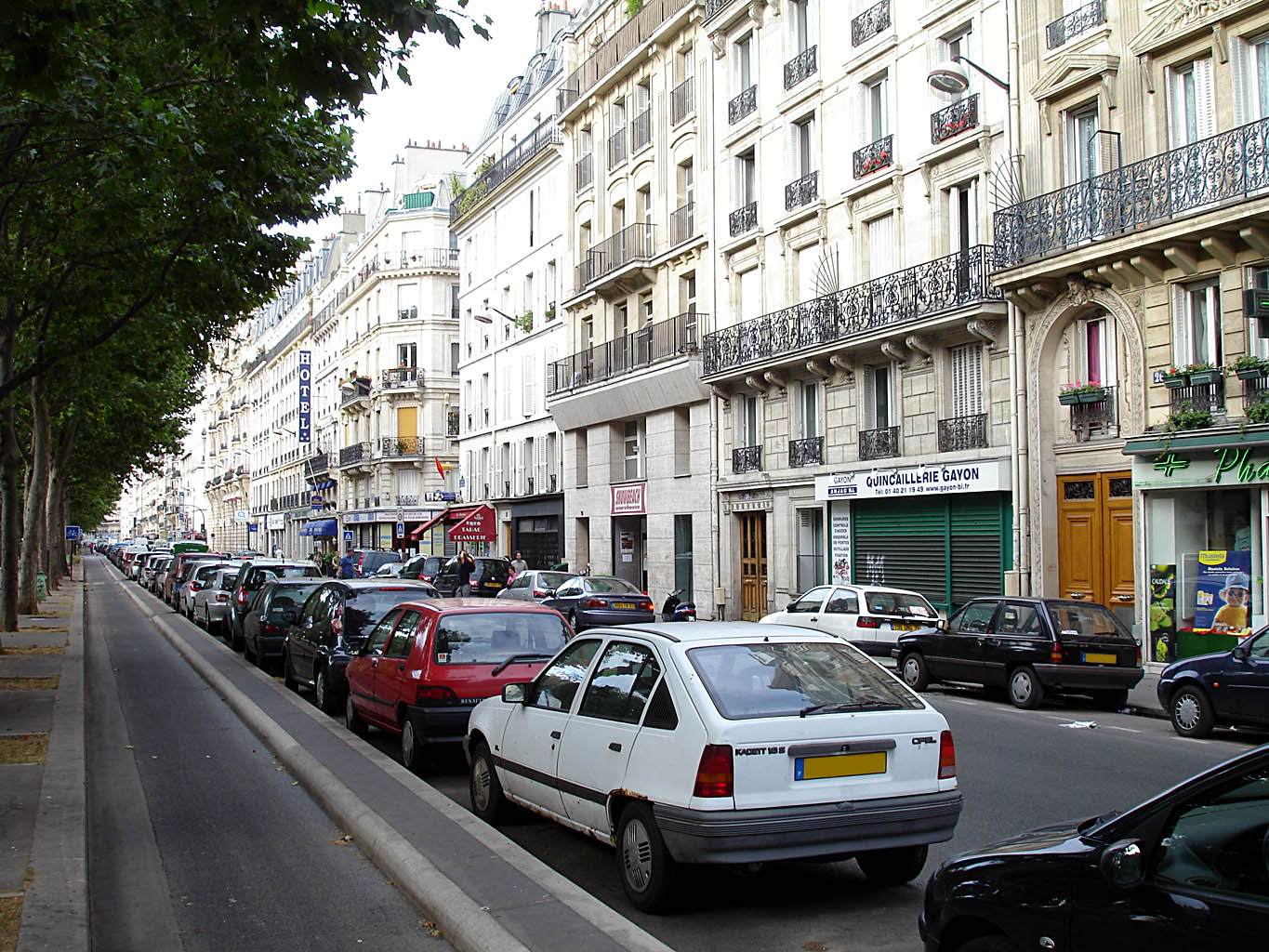
- Boulevard Richard-Lenoir

- Location within Paris
- Arrondissement: 11th
- Quarter: Bastille
- Coordinates: 48.8599°N 2.3719°E
- From: Bastille
- To: Avenue de la République

The Boulevard Richard-Lenoir (French pronunciation: [bulvaʁ ʁiʃaʁ lənwaʁ]), running from the Bastille to the Avenue de la République, is one of the wide tree-lined boulevards built by Baron Haussmann during the Second French Empire of Napoleon III.

The boulevard is named after François Richard-Lenoir (1765-1839) and Joseph Lenoir-Dufresne (1768-1806), business-partner industrialists who brought the cotton industry to Paris and northern France in the 18th and early 19th centuries. It is the site of a weekly art market and of a bi-weekly fruit and vegetable market that is one of the largest in Paris.

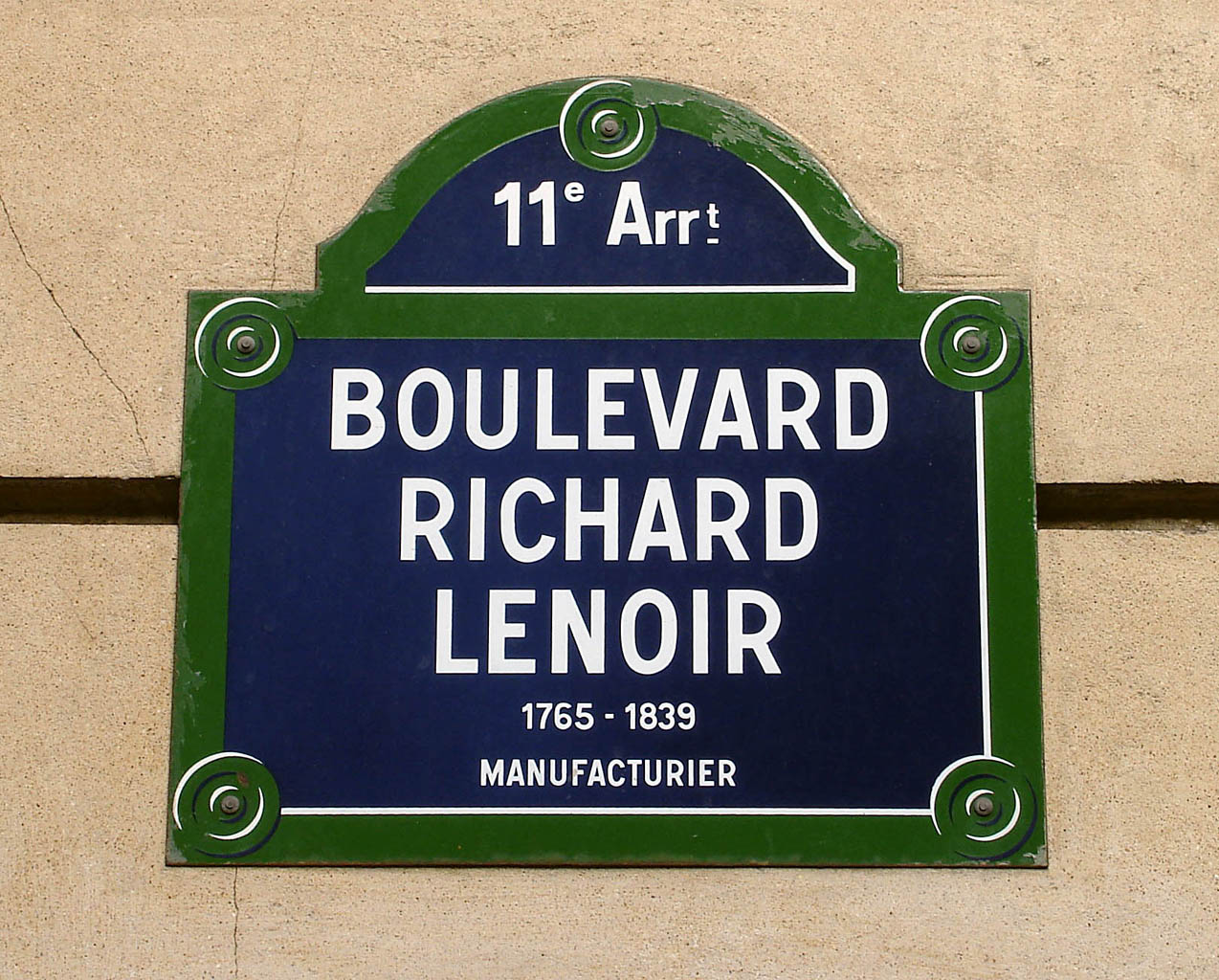
Boulevard Richard-Lenoir plaque

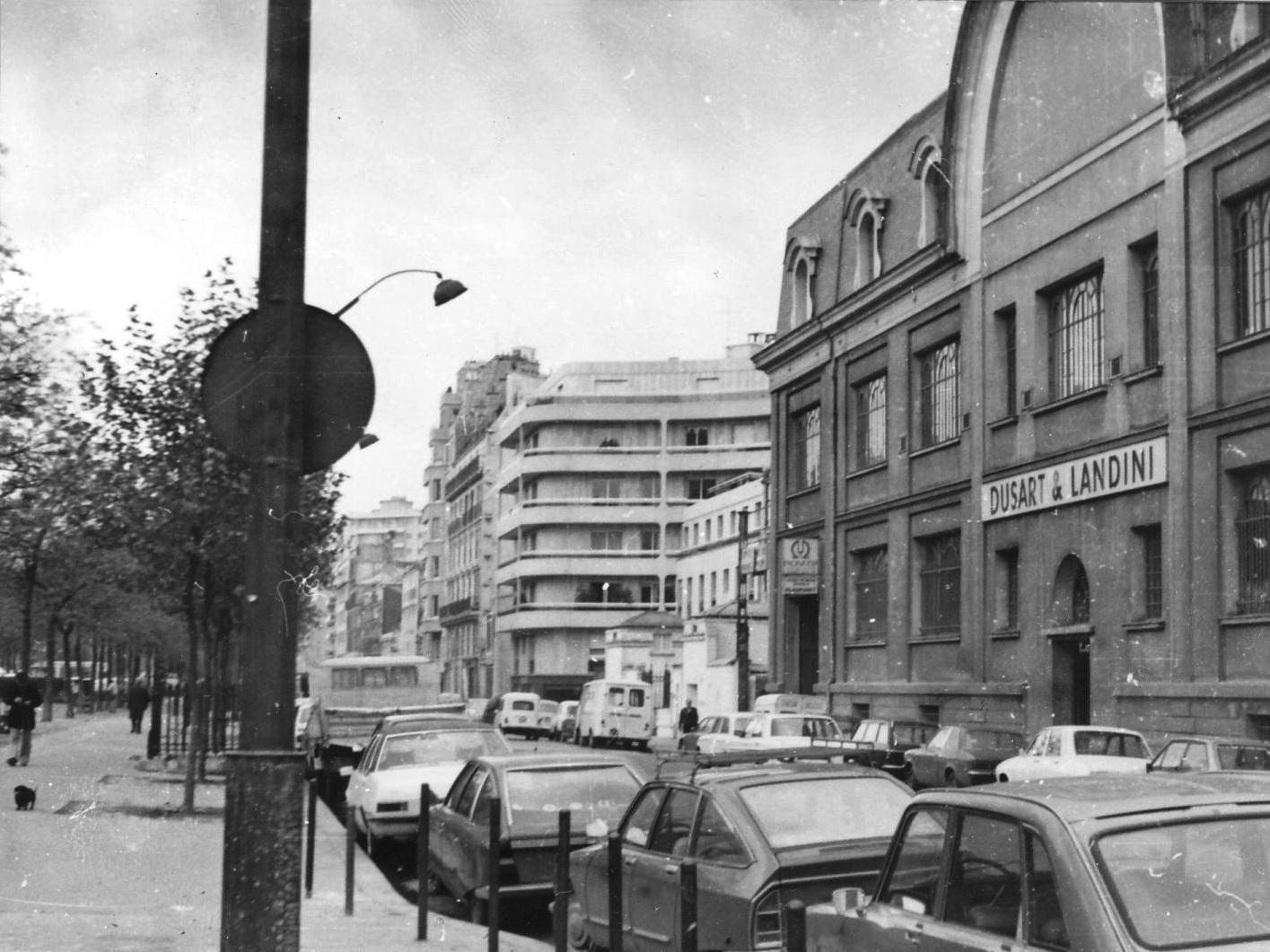
Boulevard Richard-Lenoir in 1981

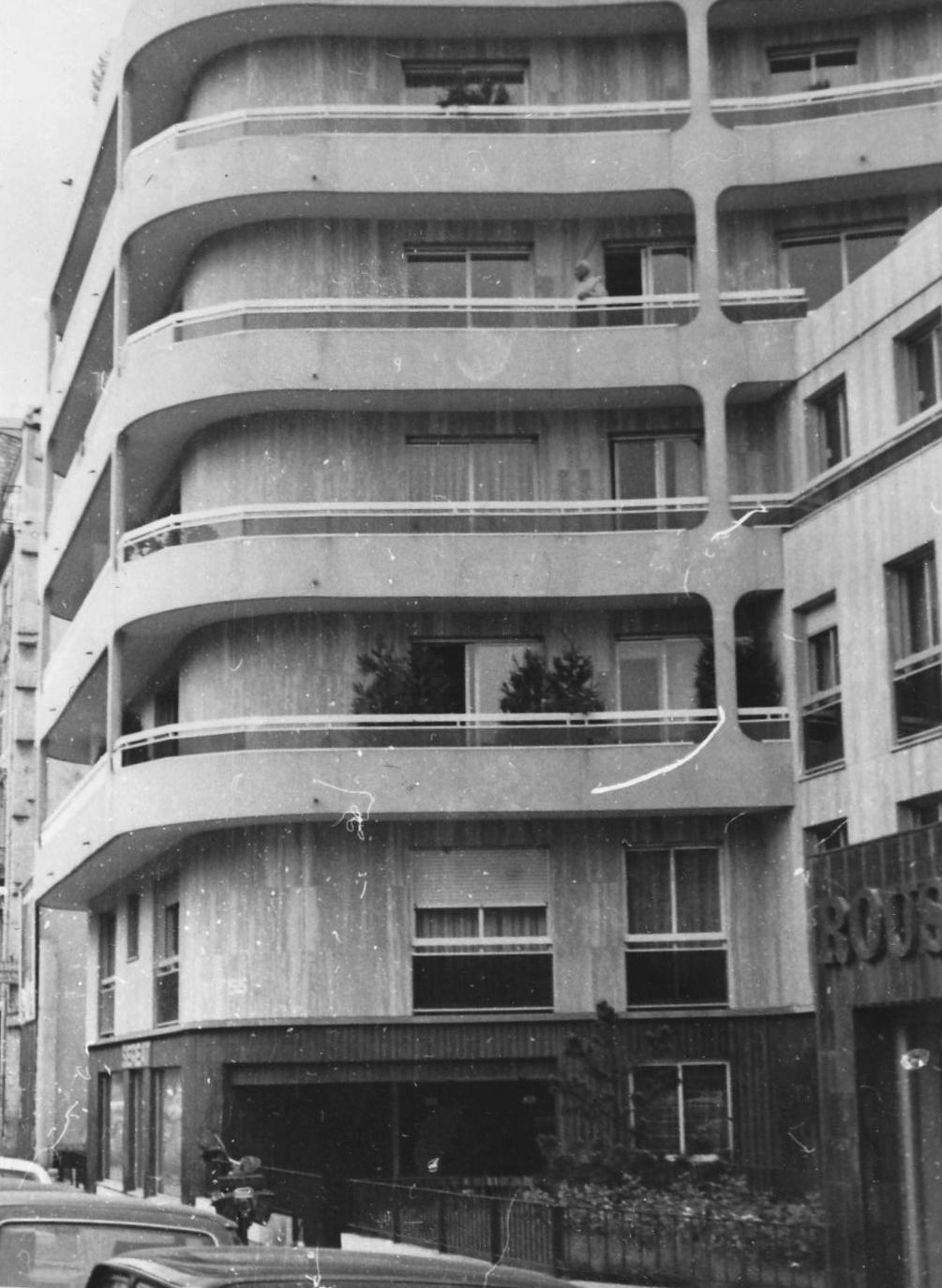
A building at the Boulevard Richard Lenoir (numbers 53-55) in Paris in 1981. Unknown architect

== Fictional ==
Georges Simenon's famous detective Jules Maigret and his wife are portrayed as living at 132 Boulevard Richard-Lenoir. It is now a pilgrimage place for fans.

== See also ==
- Richard-Lenoir (Paris Métro)
