= Paris Metro Line 5 =

Subway route in the French capital

Line 5
- Paris Metro Line 5
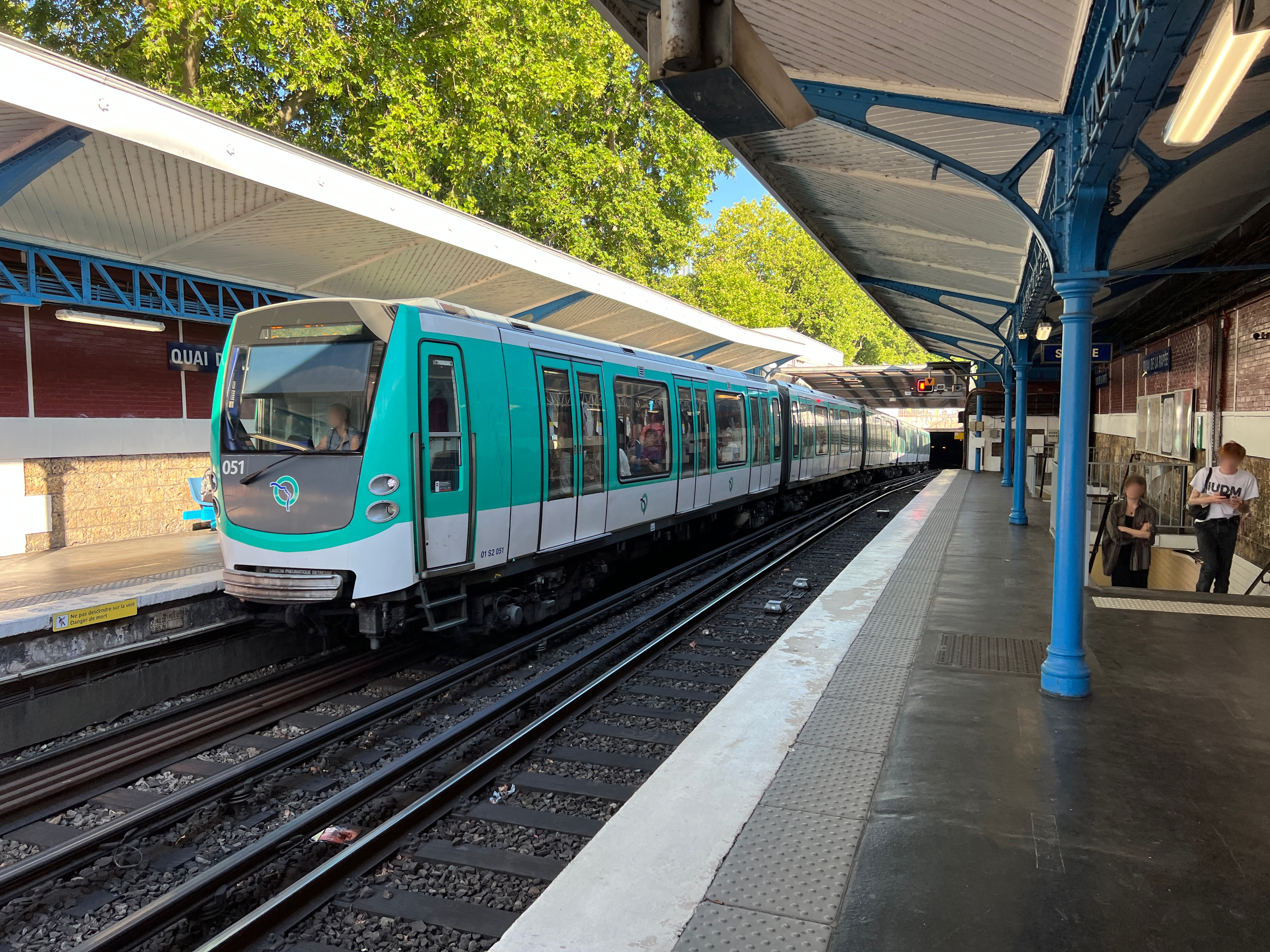
- MF 01 stock train at Quai de la Rapée station.

Overview
- Termini: Bobigny–Pablo Picasso; Place d'Italie
- Connecting lines: Paris Metro Paris Metro Line 1 Paris Metro Line 2 Paris Metro Line 3 Paris Metro Line 4 Paris Metro Line 6 Paris Metro Line 7 Paris Metro Line 7bis Paris Metro Line 8 Paris Metro Line 9 Paris Metro Line 10 Paris Metro Line 11 RER RER B RER C RER D RER E Transilien Transilien Line H (Paris-Nord) Transilien Line K (Paris-Nord) Transilien Line P (Paris-Est) Tramways in Île-de-France Île-de-France tramway Line 1 Île-de-France tramway Line 3b
- Stations: 22

Service
- System: Paris Métro
- Operator: RATP
- Rolling stock: MF 01 (52 trains as of 30 July 2023)
- Ridership: 105,000,000 (avg. per year); 8th/16 (2025)

History
- Opened: 2 June 1906; 120 years ago

Technical
- Line length: 14.6 km (9.1 mi)
- Track gauge: 1,435 mm (4 ft 8 1/2 in) standard gauge
- Electrification: 750 V DC third rail
- Conduction system: Conductor
- Average inter-station distance: 697 m (2,287 ft)

Paris Metro Line 5 is one of the sixteen currently opened lines of the Paris Métro in Paris, France. It crosses the east of Paris on a north-south axis, from Bobigny–Pablo Picasso to Place d'Italie. It is the eighth-busiest line on the network.

== History ==
Initially called Line E on Fulgence Bienvenüe's project and limited to the section between Pont d'Austerlitz (now Quai de la Rapée) and Boulevard de Strasbourg (Gare de l'Est), Paris' Métro Line 5 is the first opened line crossing Paris on a north-south axis : Line 4 – the main north-south line of the parisian network – was only fully opened in 1910.

The line was initially meant to call at Gare de Lyon, which would have allowed larger traffic and increased transfer capacity with the already-opened line 1. However, the terrain made it eventually impossible as the nearby Rue de Bercy made any reasonable incline from the Austerlitz viaduct towards Gare de Lyon impossible. A single-track shuttle service from Mazas was briefly opened - hence the third track at Line 1's Gare de Lyon station - for a brief moment, then removed as the line extended north along Bienvenüe's project, towards Gare de l'Est, with Lancry (now Jacques Bonsergent) as a temporary terminus and Bastille as a direct connection with line 1. This single track is now known as Voie des Finances, since it comes close to the French Ministry of Economics and Finance.

On the other hand, the Italie loop, initially shared with line 2 sud (Etoile - Italie), was closed to allow better handling of both lines terminating there. But the results quickly prompted CMP (ancestor to the RATP) to construct a new station, east of the loop and initially meant for the future (and current) line 6, in order to home the terminus of then line 2 sud and thus separate the two lines. Line 5, however, didn't reuse the loop afterwards. Shortly after, the two lines were merged, making line 5 the then longest line for the next three decades.

On 6 october 1942, as the line's next extension opened to test run, it appeared that the new line 5 would become too long for regular smooth operation : It its decided to split line 5 at Italie again, with line 6 taking over the former line 2 sud from Italie to Étoile. A week later, line 5 connected Place d'Italie, to the church of Pantin, northeast of Paris.

During the 70s, as several projects around it emerged, line 5 welcomed (albeit shortly after line 3) brand new and modern rolling stock, dubbed MF 67.

On 15 June 2011 the MF 01 began entering revenue service onto Line 5, gradually replacing the aging stock. The initial announcement was made in 2006 and trains began to be tested during the course of late 2010 and early 2011. As of June 2013, only three to five MF 67 trains remain in service. There is also one MF 01 train for Line 9 (#096) that is in revenue service along Line 5. None of the Line 9 trains will enter revenue service on Line 9 until sometime in September 2013.

== Chronology ==
- 20 April 1896: Paris' Municial Council adopts Fulgence Bienvenüe's subway project, which includes Line 5 as then Line E.
- 30 March 1898: Fulgence Bienvenüe's project is declared "of public utility", which is mandatory to start construction works.
- November 1903: Construction starts on the Austerlitz viaduct above the Seine.
- 2 June 1906: Line 5 was inaugurated with a section from Place d'Italie to the Gare d'Orléans (now known as Gare d'Austerlitz).
- 13 July 1906: the Austerlitz viaduct is complete, allowing line 5's extension one station north of Gare d'Orléans, to Place Mazas (now known as Quai de la Rapée)
- 14 July 1906: The line was temporarily extended to Gare de Lyon.
- 17 December 1906: The line was extended to Lancry (now known as Jacques Bonsergent), and the section from Mazas to Gare de Lyon is closed.
- 14 October 1907: Line 2 Sud (now line 6) from Étoile to Place d'Italie was incorporated to line 5.
- 15 November 1907: The line was extended from Lancry to Gare du Nord (former station).
- 2 September 1939: Services to Arsenal station ceased at the start of World War II, and never resumed since.
- 6 October 1942: The Étoile–Place d'Italie portion of the line was transferred to line 6, along with line 5's former workshops.
- 12 October 1942: Line 5 was extended from Gare du Nord to Église de Pantin, with a new station built for the former. The old Gare du Nord terminus, which featured a loop, now serves as a training center for RATP staff under the acronym USFRT, along with the transfer track connecting Line 5 to Line 2.
- 25 April 1985: The line was extended from Église de Pantin to Bobigny–Pablo Picasso.
- 19 January 2009: reopening of the Italie loop, after its closure in 1907.
- 15 June 2011: Cascading of MF 67 to MF 01 rolling stock began.
- 2 May 2013: Cascading of MF67 to MF 01 rolling stock is complete.
- 5 March 2014: The last MF 67 train on the line is reformed.

== Future ==
- During the 1970s, an idea was coined to push line 5 towards the Orly Airport, in replacement of an RER line deemed too expensive. This also got cancelled as too expensive in austere times. The Orly Airport was not directly serviced by rail until Orlyval in 1991, and Métro line 14 in 2024, with Métro line 18 expected by 2030.
- An extension south from Place d'Italie to Place de Rungis has been put forward, but was reported multiple times due to the heavy now-line 6 infrastructure around the line's actual terminus, including said line's main workshop, which makes the project very difficult unless a new Line 5 station is built further south.
- An intermediate station, Bobigny–La Folie, has been planned for decades in between Bobigny–Pablo Picasso and Bobigny–Pantin–Raymond Queneau stations, and the RATP owns the land premises to such station. The current stretch of track between the two northernmost Line 5 stations, is one of the longest between adjacent stations on the Métro network (therefore excluding RER lines). The upcoming extension of Tramway line 11 to Noisy-le-Sec would cross line 5 at this very spot, furthering the project's doability.
- An extension further north towards Drancy has also been proposed multiple times, but no official works have started on RATP's part.

== Map ==

Map of Paris Métro Line 5.

=== Stations renamed ===
- 15 October 1907: Place Mazas renamed as Pont d'Austerlitz.
- 1 June 1916: Pont d'Austerlitz renamed Quai de la Rapée.
- 15 October 1930: Gare d'Orléans renamed Gare d'Orléans-Austerlitz.
- 10 February 1946: Lancry renamed Jacques Bonsergent.
- 1979: Gare d'Orléans-Austerlitz renamed Gare d'Austerlitz.

== Tourism ==
Métro line 5 passes near several places of interest :

- The Place d'Italie and the area of the Butte aux Cailles
- The Place de la République
- place de la Bastille and the eponymous Opera house.
- The 19th century railway stations Gare du Nord, Gare de l'Est and Gare d'Austerlitz.
- The Parc de la Villette and the Cité des Sciences et de l'Industrie (Porte de Pantin).
- The Canal de l'Ourcq at Bastille, Bréguet-Sabin, Richard Lenoir, Stalingrad, Jaurès and Bobigny - Pantin - Raymond Queneau stations
- The Prefecture of Seine-Saint-Denis at Bobigny - Pablo Picasso station.

== Connections ==
- RER lines B, C, D and E
- Tramway lines 1, 3b and 11 (in project)
- Eurostar to the UK, the Netherlands, Belgium and Germany at Gare du Nord
- TGV / ICE line to Stuttgart and Munich at Gare de l'Est
- ICE line to Berlin at Gare de l'Est
- Nightjet night lines to Berlin and Vienna, also at Gare de l'Est
- Intercités, Intercités de Nuit and Ouigo Train Classique to the south of France at Gare d'Austerlitz
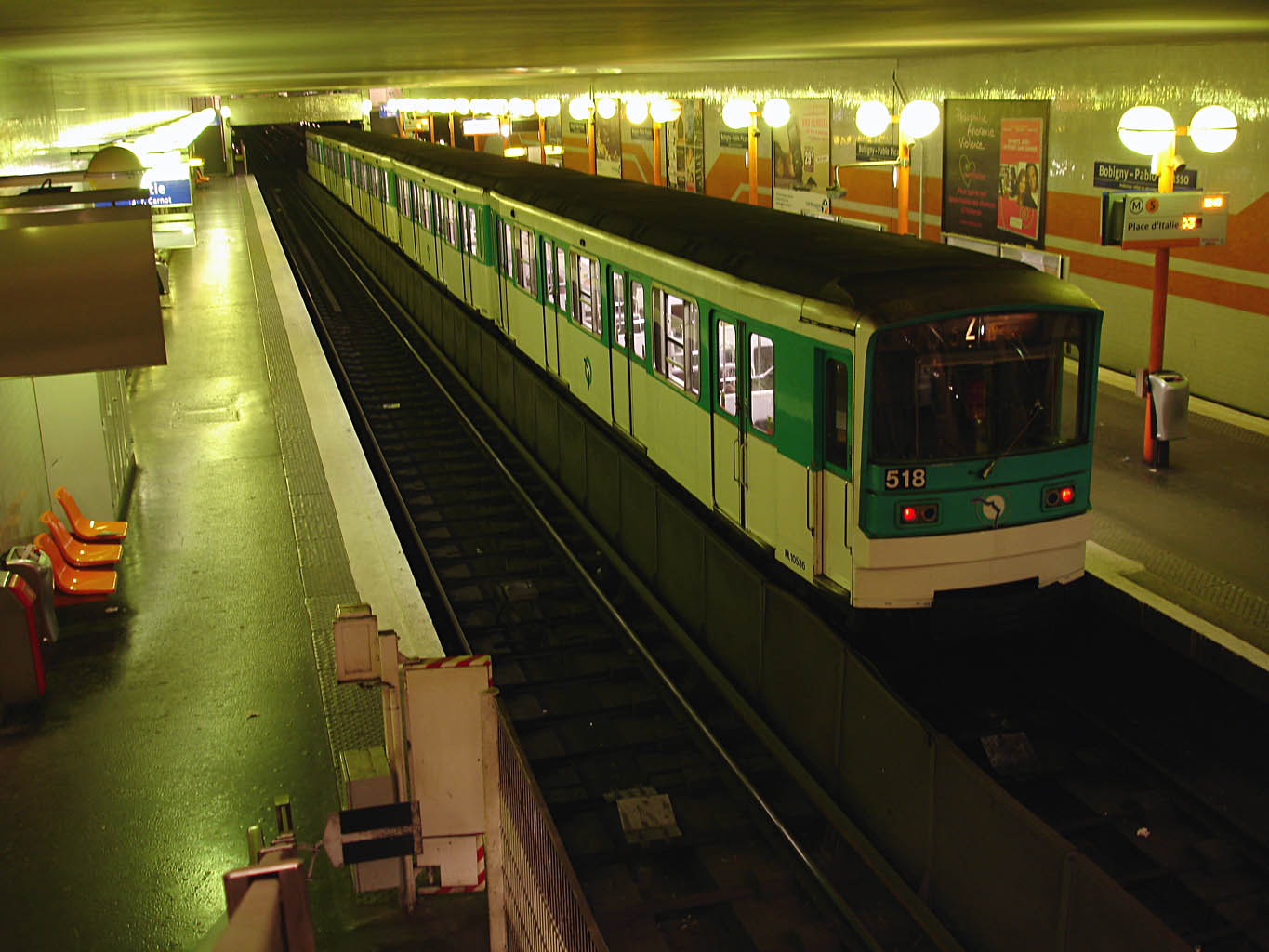
Bobigny–Pablo Picasso

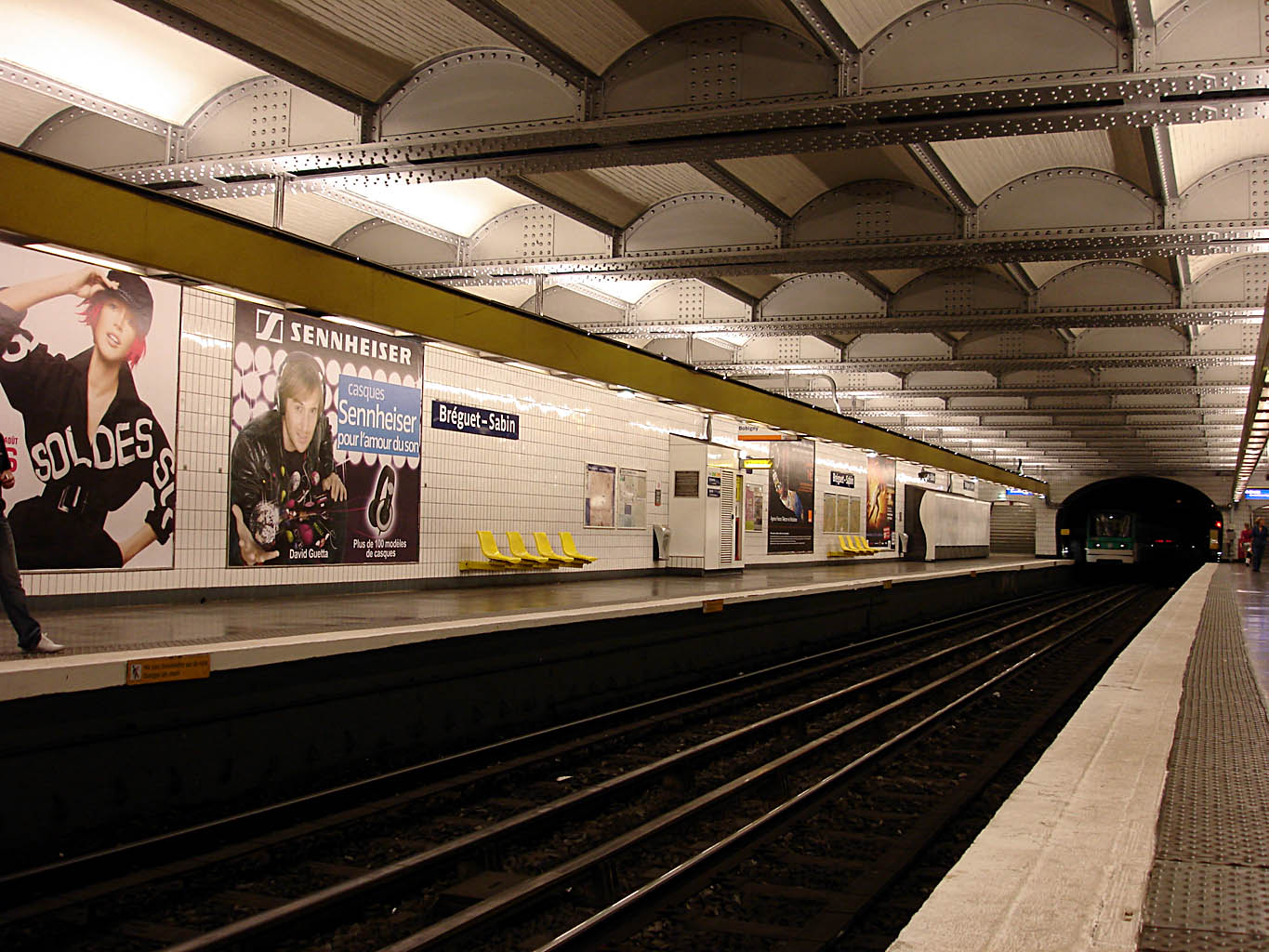
Bréguet–Sabin

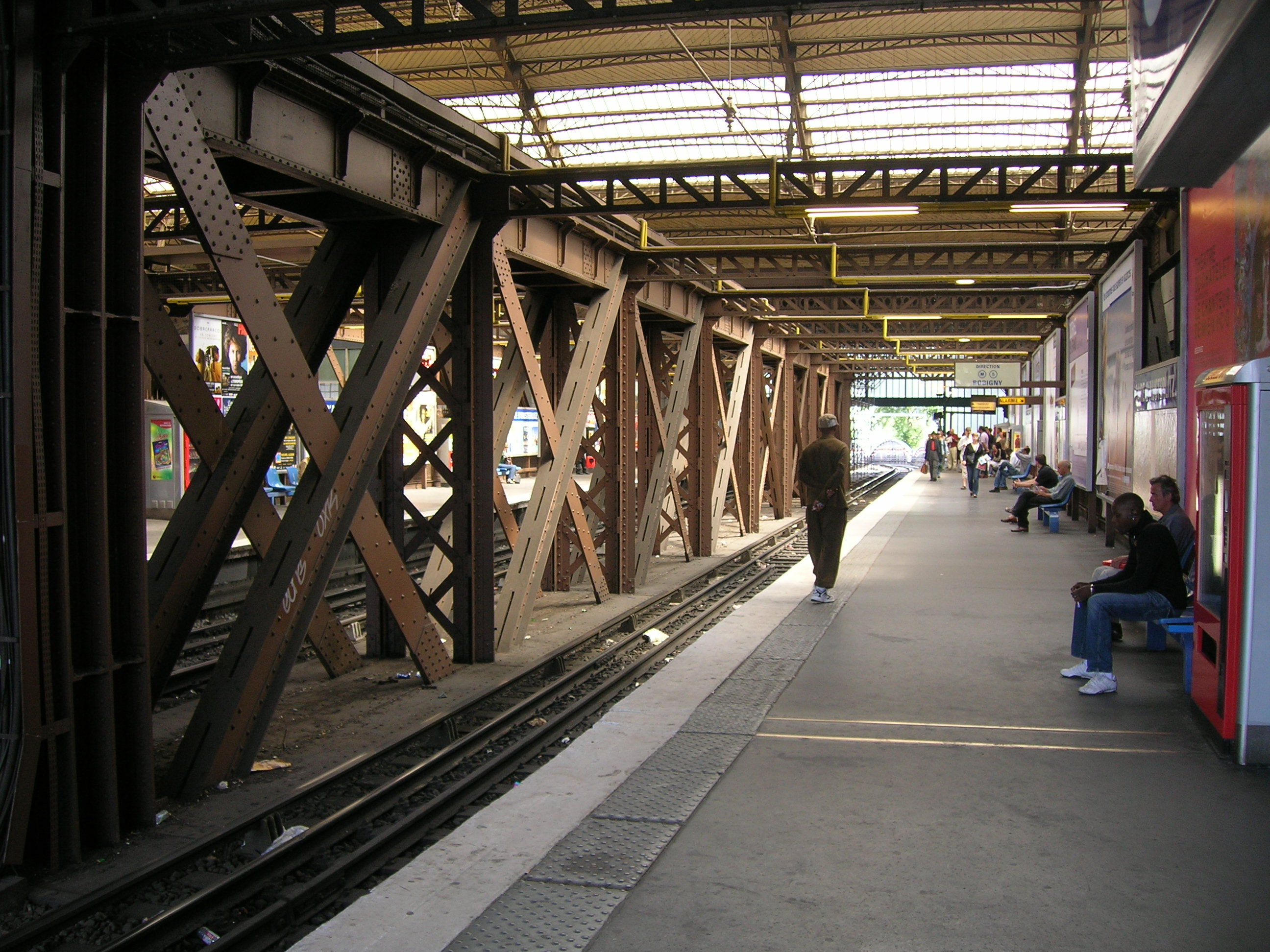
Gare d'Austerlitz

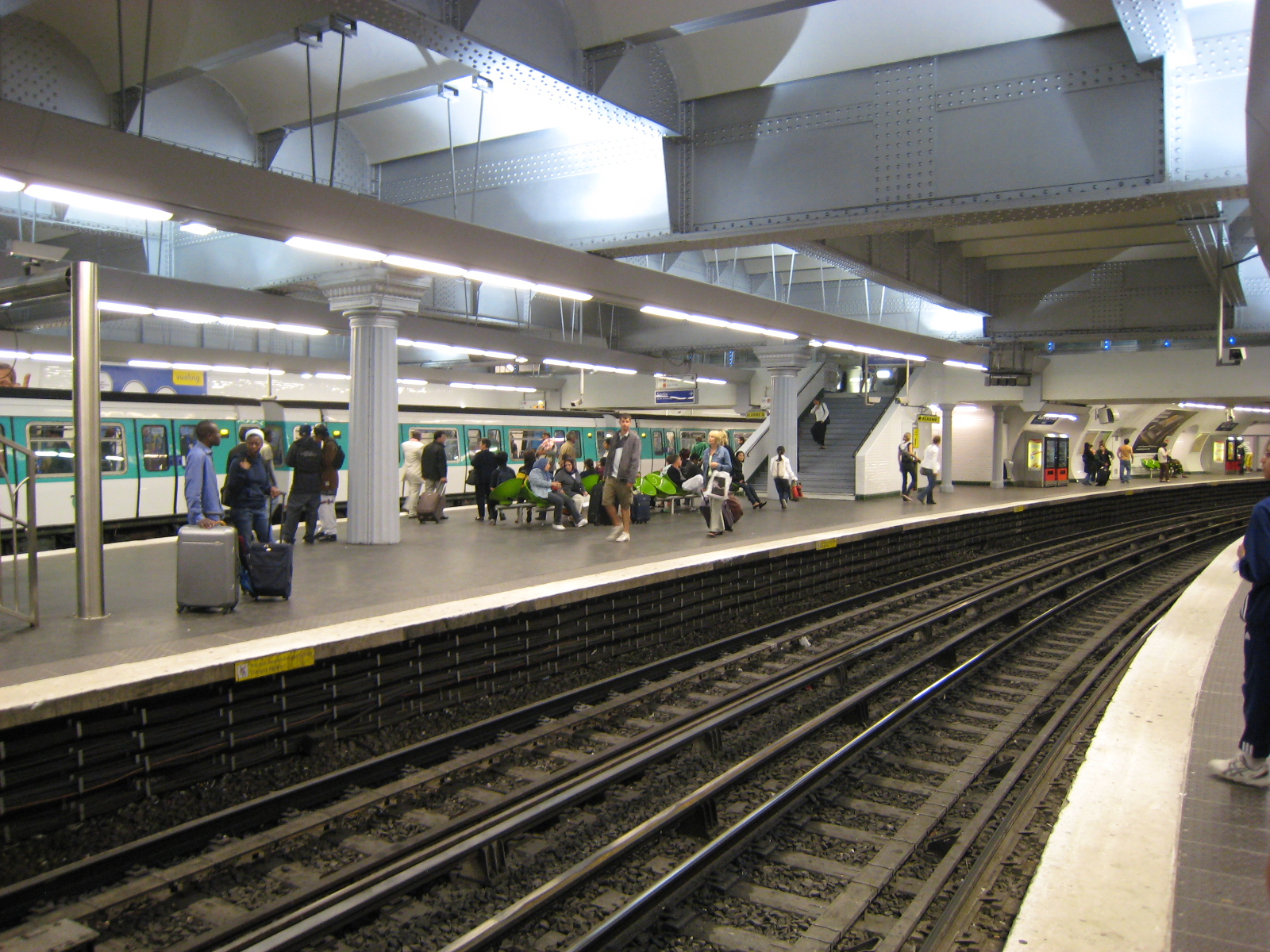
Gare de l'Est

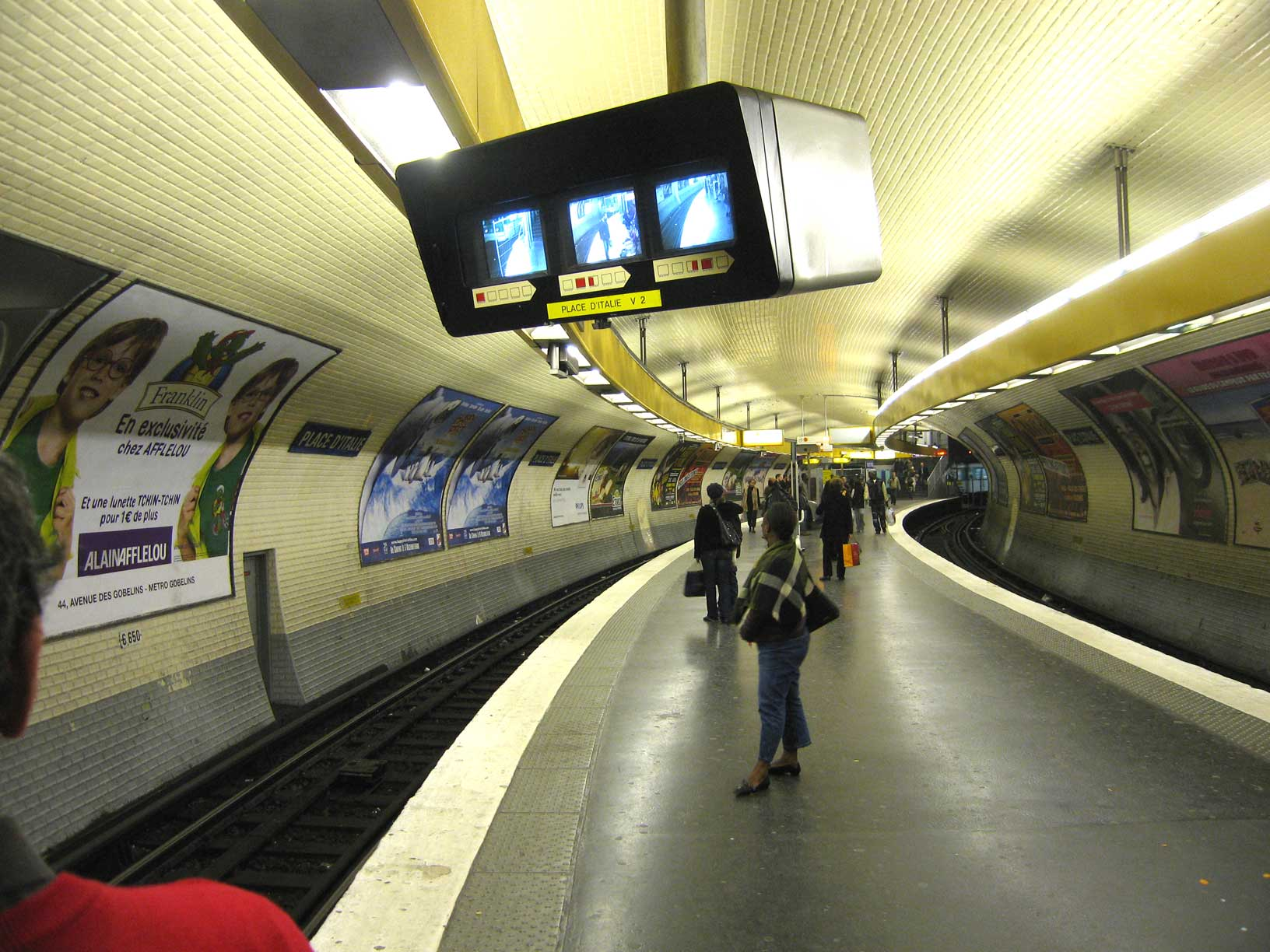
Place d'Italie

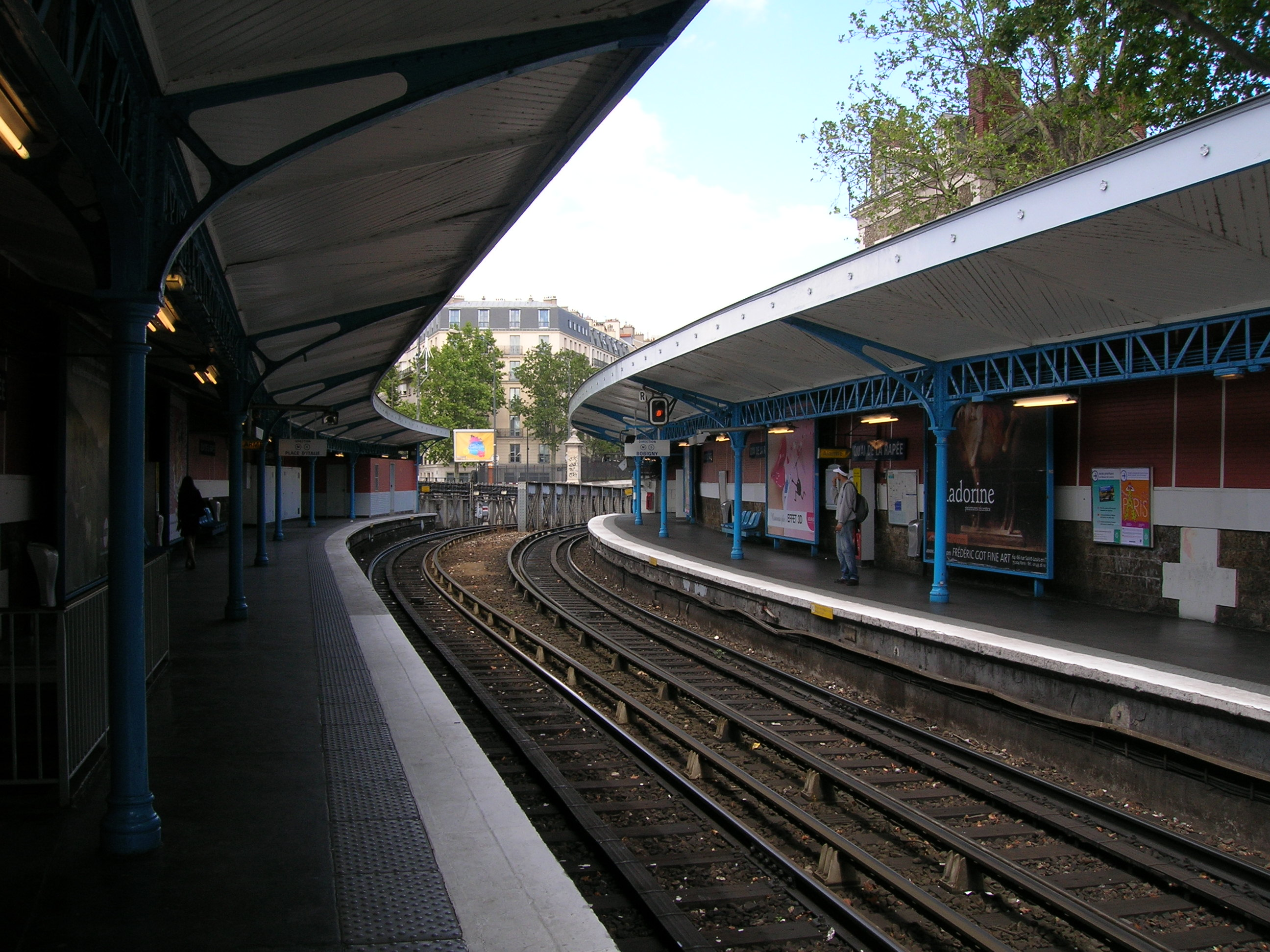
Quai de la Rapée

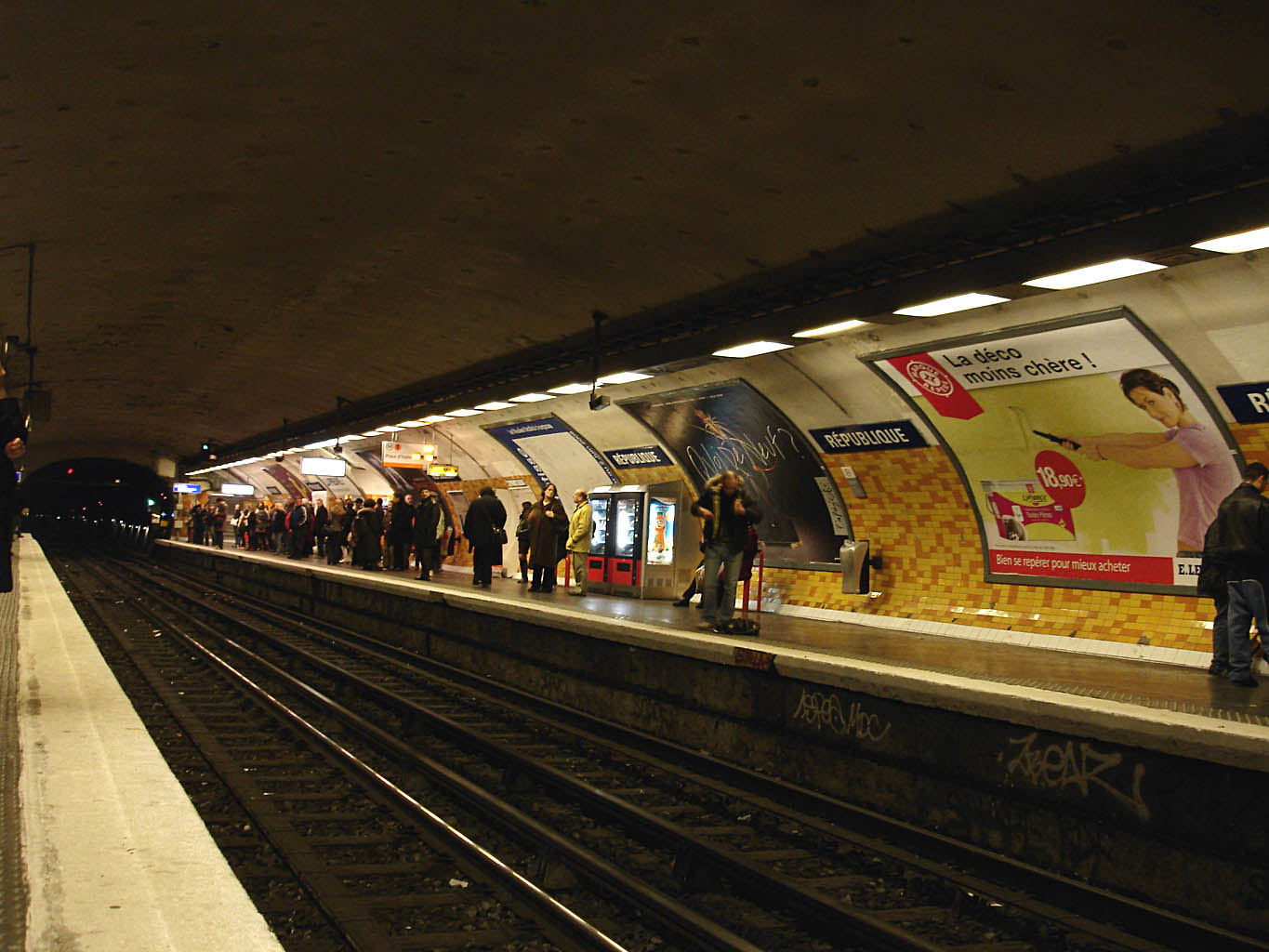
République

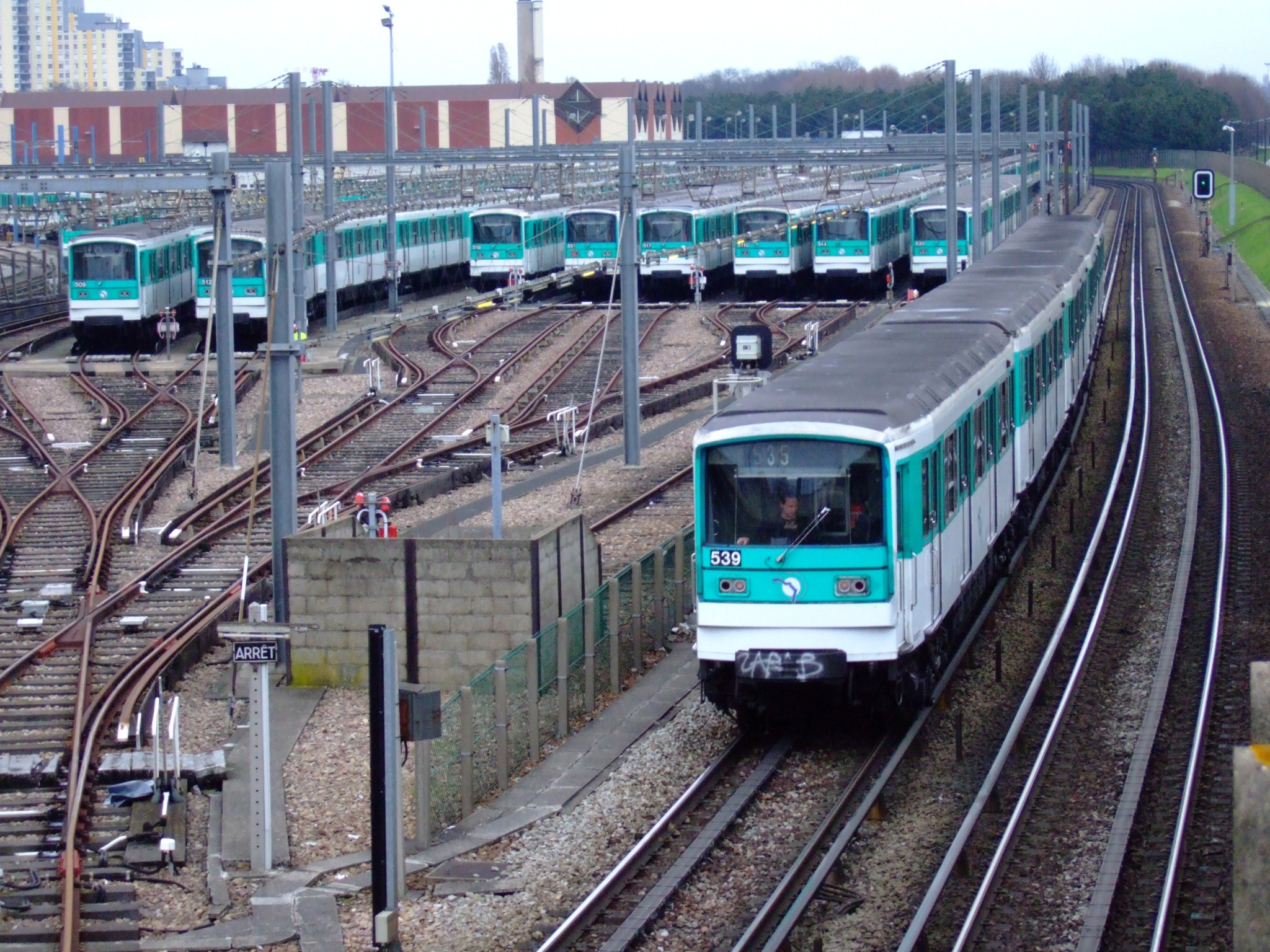
MF 67 trains at Bobigny depot.

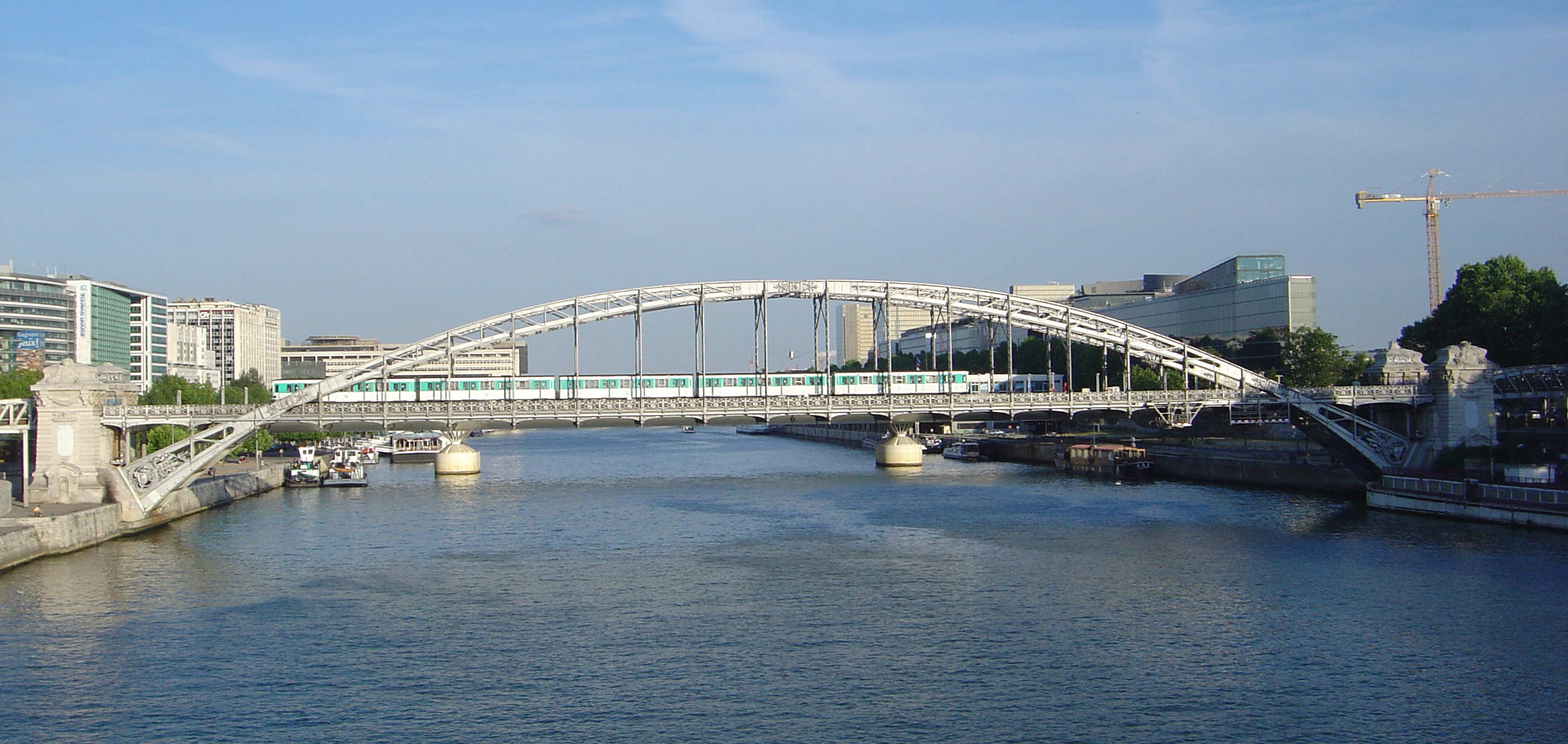
MF 67 train on Viaduc d'Austerlitz.

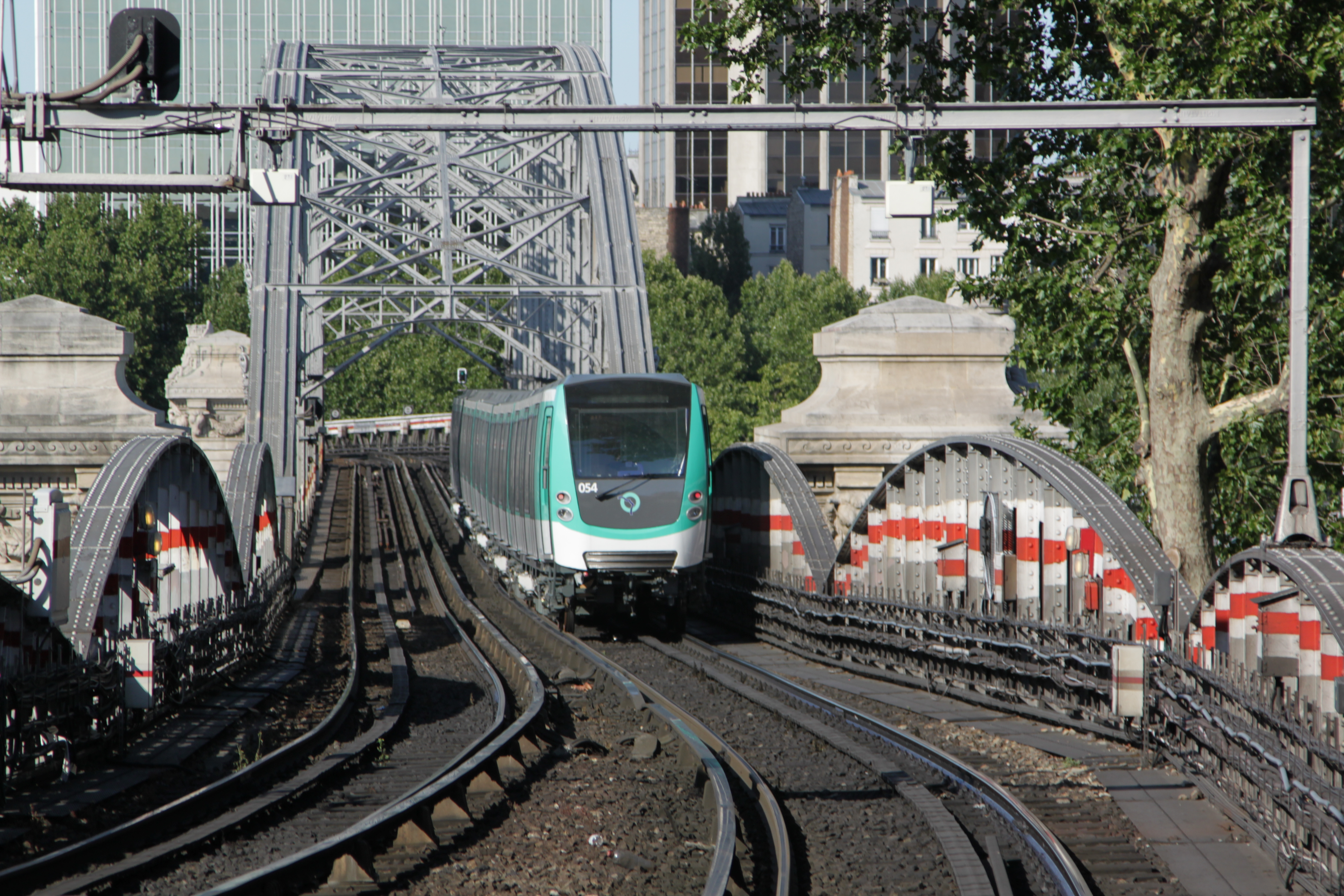
New MF 01 stock train.

== See also ==
- Paris
- Transport in Paris
- List of stations of the Paris Métro
- List of stations of the Paris RER
- List of metro systems
- Rail transport in France
