= Avenue Ledru Rollin =

Avenue in Paris, France

Ledru-Rollin Avenue
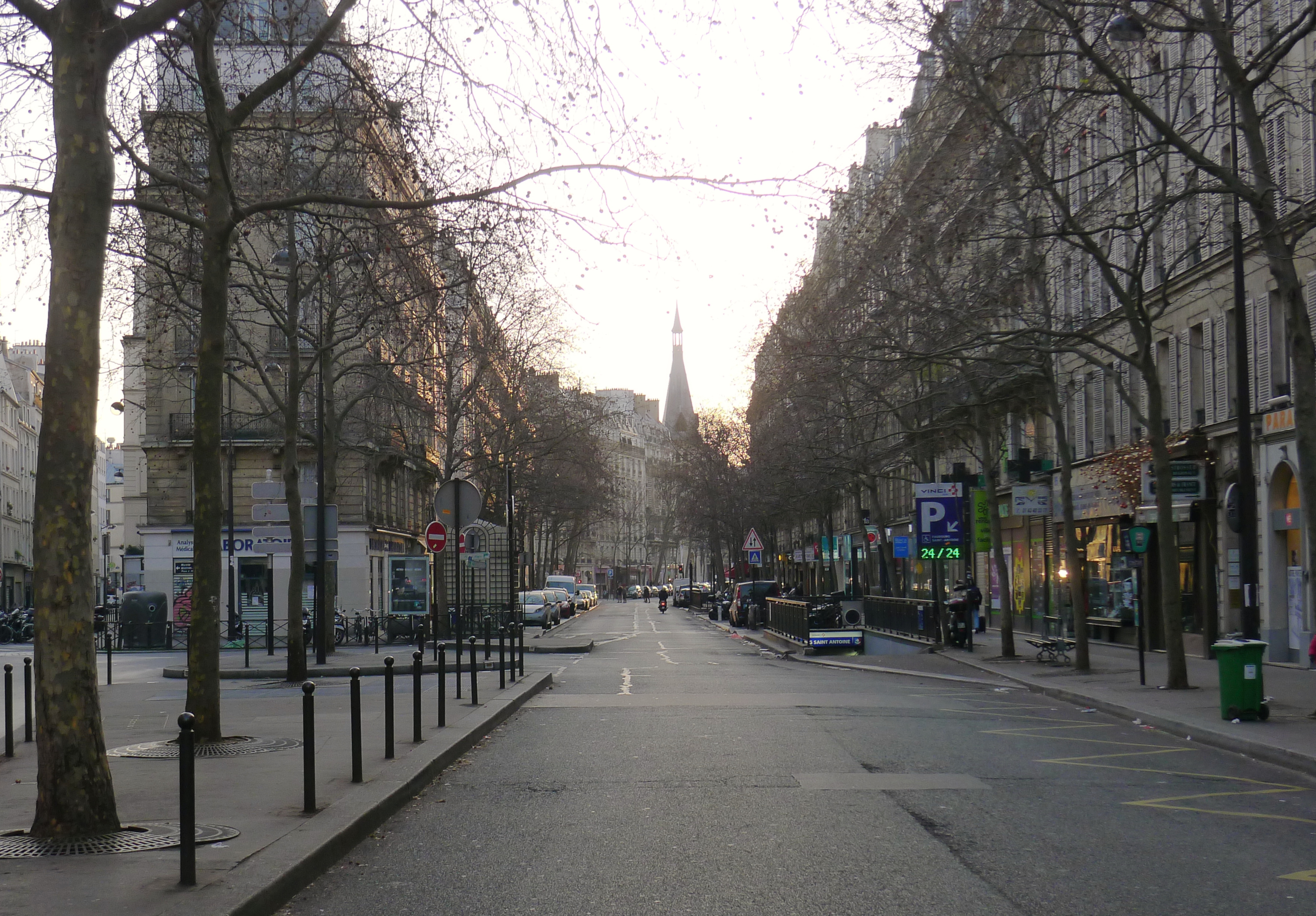
- Former name(s): Rue Saint-Claude, Avenue Lacuée
- Length: 1540 metres
- Width: 30 metres
- Location: Paris, France
- Arrondissement: 11th & 12th
- Quarter: Quinze-Vingts, Sainte-Marguerite, and Roquette
- Postal code: 75012, 75011
- Nearest metro station: .
- Coordinates: 48.84865°N 2.372555°E
- From: 36, quai de la Râpée
- To: 114, rue de la Roquette & 49, rue Godefroy-Cavaignac

Construction
- Commissioned: 1859
- Completion: 1931
- Inauguration: 16 August 1879

The Avenue Ledru-Rollin is a street situated in the neighbourhoods of Quinze-Vingts of the 12th arrondissement and Sainte-Marguerite and Roquette of the 11th arrondissement of Paris.

== Location ==
The Avenue Ledru-Rollin is a broad thoroughfare of about 1.5 kilometres in length which unites the Pont d'Austerlitz to the Town Hall of the 11th arrondissement, at the Place Léon Blum. Its initial orientation is north-east, but it eventually curves towards the north. The entire avenue is bordered by trees on both sides, and it passes through the three main east-west arteries of the 12th arrondissement: the Avenue Daumesnil, the Rue de Charenton and the Rue du Faubourg-Saint-Antoine, the last of which marks the border between the 12th and the 11th arrondissements. Most of the buildings on the avenue date from the 19th and 20th centuries, and some of them are quite distinguished.

The Avenue Ledru-Rollin is easily accessed via the Métro stations Quai de la Rapée ( ), Ledru-Rollin ( ), and Voltaire ( ). It is also close to the stations Bastille and Gare de Lyon on Metro Line, and is home to many bus stops as well, including the 20, 24, 57, 61, 63, and 65 as well as the 69, 76 and 86.

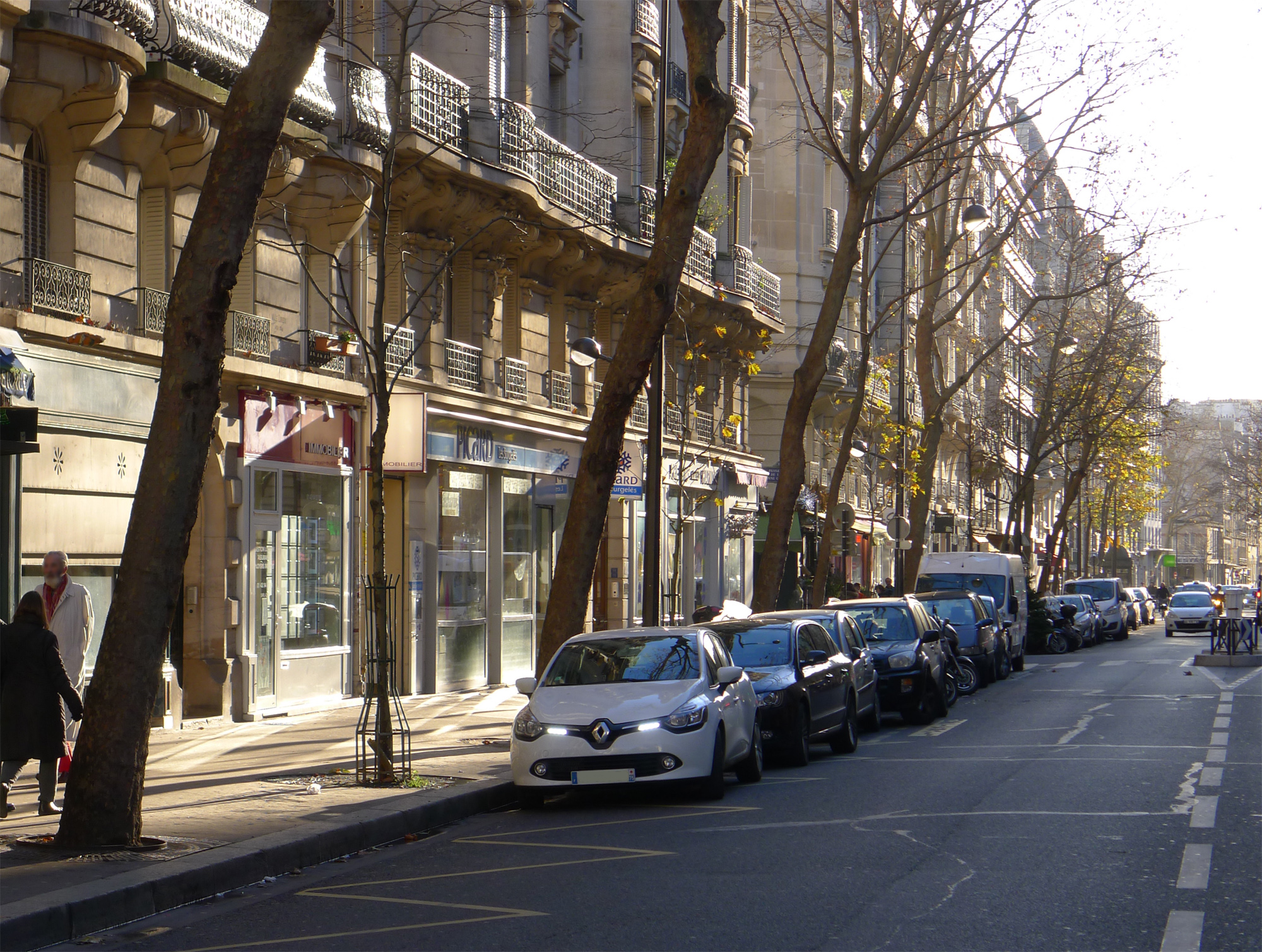
Avenue Ledru-Rollin in the 11th arrondissement

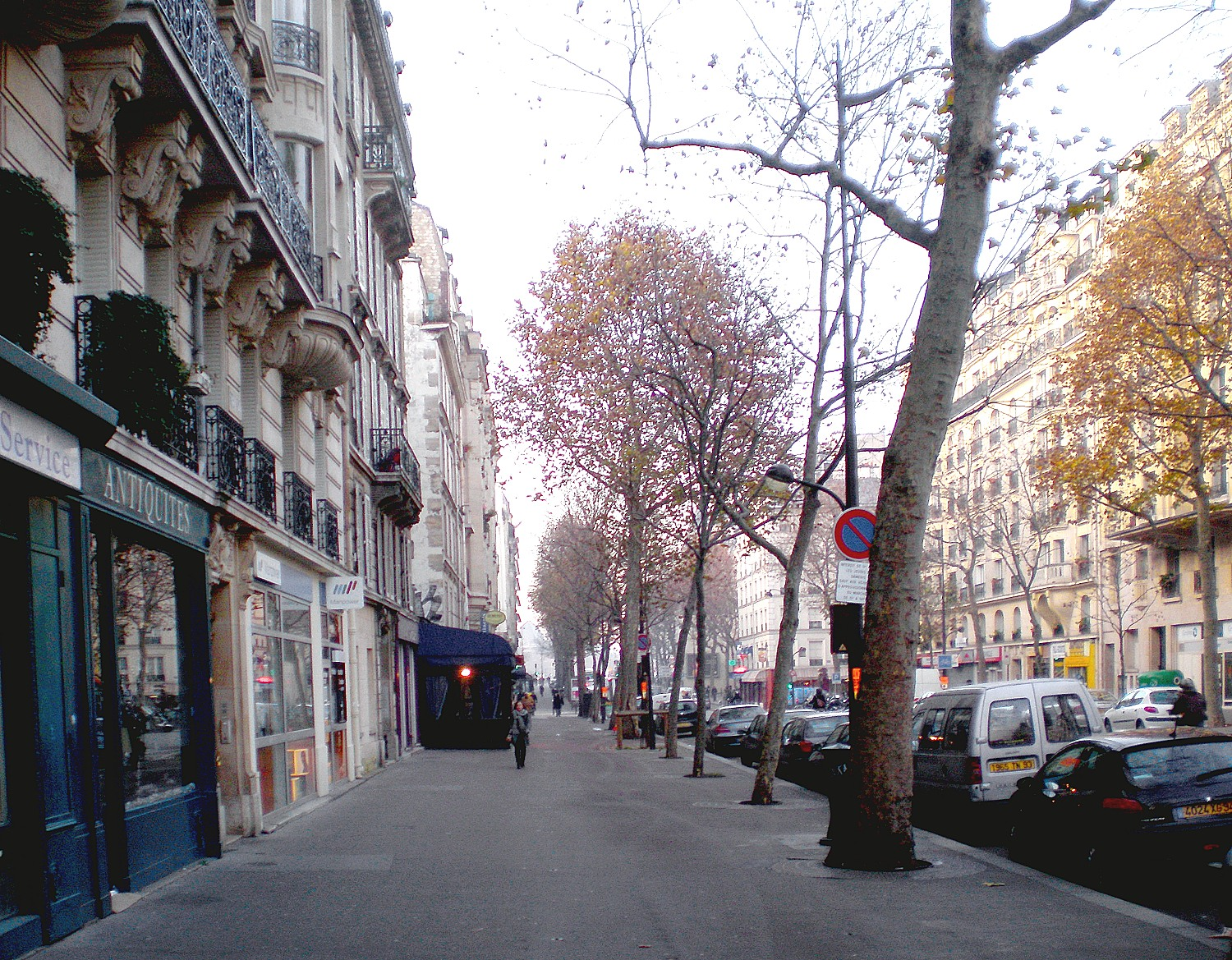
In the 12th arrondissement, towards the Pont d'Austerlitz and the Seine River

== Origin of the name ==
In 1879, the avenue was named in honour of the French lawyer and politician Alexandre Auguste Ledru, also known as Ledru-Rollin (1807-1874), Minister of the Interior of the 2nd Republic, and a champion of universal suffrage (for men). Twenty-six other French cities and towns also bear streets with the name Ledru-Rollin: a boulevard in Montpellier, and streets in Agen, Dijon, Avignon, Châteauroux, Tours, Tarbes, Bellac, Argenton-sur-Creuse, Limoges, Marseille, La Ciotat, Moulins, Pertuis, Hellemmes, Reims, Roanne, Rueil-Malmaison, Suresnes, Mauguio, Rochefort-sur-Mer, Sotteville-lès-Rouen, Houilles, Choisy-le-Roi, Ivry-sur-Seine, and in Fontenay-aux-Roses, where he died on 31 December 1874.

== History ==
A part of the Avenue Ledru-Rollin was inundated in the famous 1910 Great Flood of Paris.

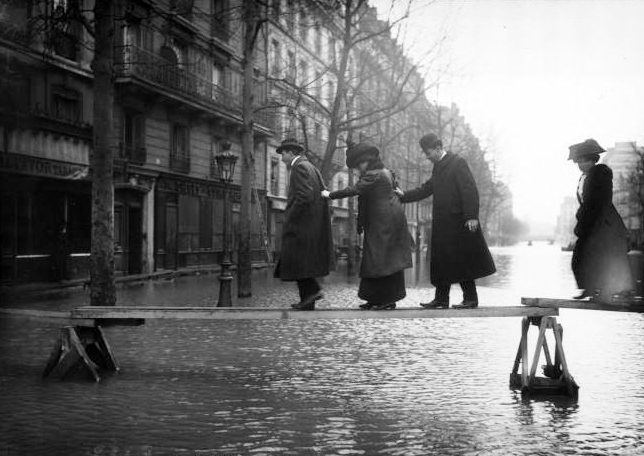
Pedestrians traversing planks over the floodwaters

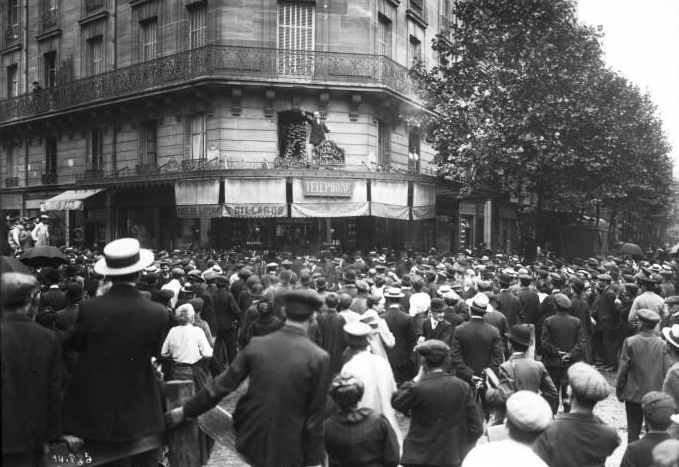
A demonstration against flooding conditions in January 1910

== Notable buildings ==
- The beginning of the Pont d'Austerlitz.
- No. 33: the technical secondary school Chennevière-Malézieux.
- No. 40: the sculptures on the facade are by Émile Joseph Nestor Carlier (1849-1927).
- At the intersection with the Avenue Daumesnil, the high line called Promenade plantée, developed in the late 1990s from a disused train bridge.
- No. 66: the primary entrance to the parish church St. Antoine des XV-XX.
- No. 153: a former Protestant church, built in 1882 by W. Hansen, is notable for the sculpture of an open Bible. This building is listed on the protected buildings of the 11th arrondissement.
- No. 160: the pastry shop La Couronne du Roi, is located, which specialises in cake design.
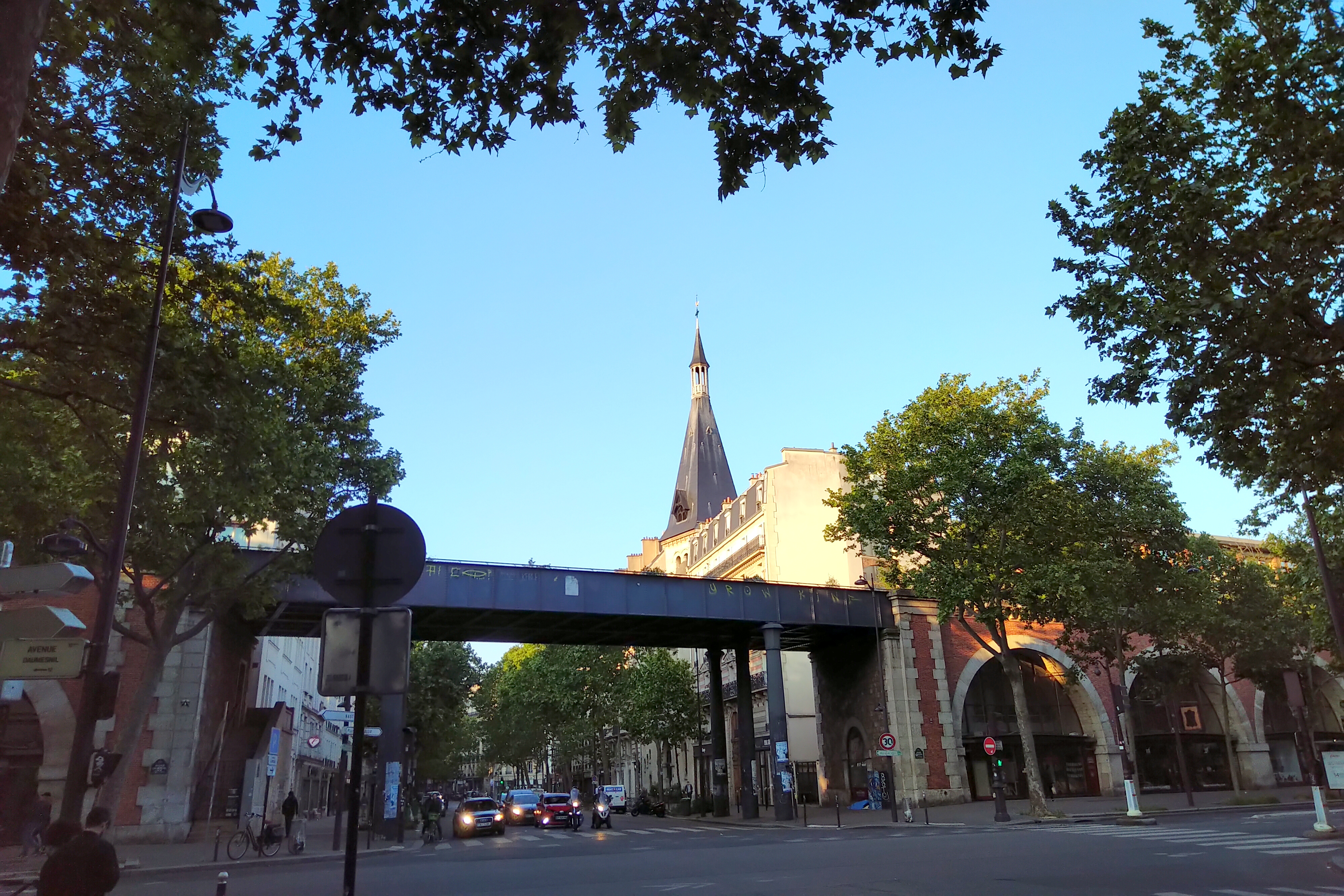
The pedestrian bridge of the Promenade plantée (Coulée verte) traverses the avenue at the intersection of the Avenue Daumesnil. The steeple of St. Antoine Church is also visible.

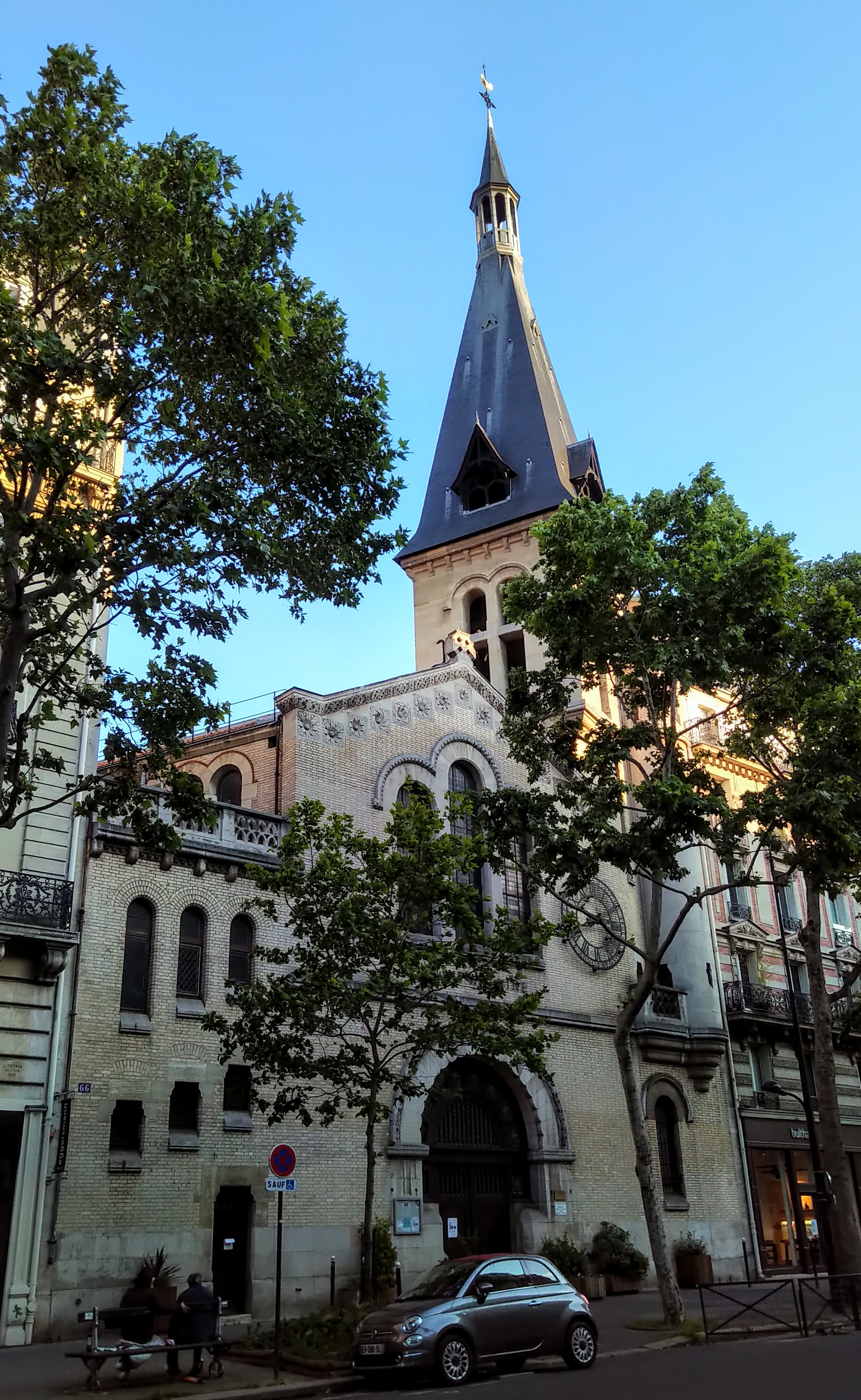
The bell tower and exterior of St. Antoine Church

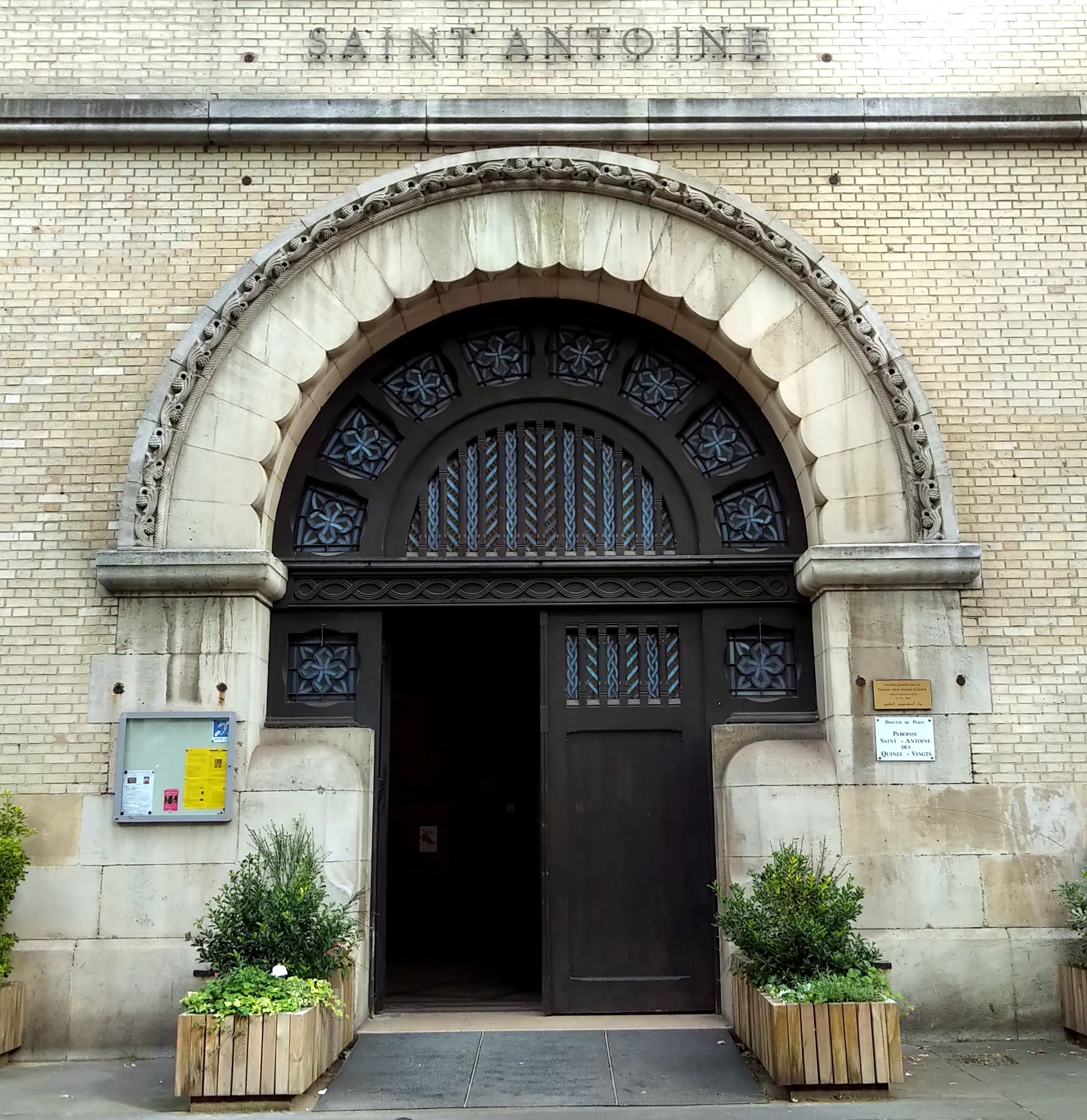
The main entrance to St. Antoine Church

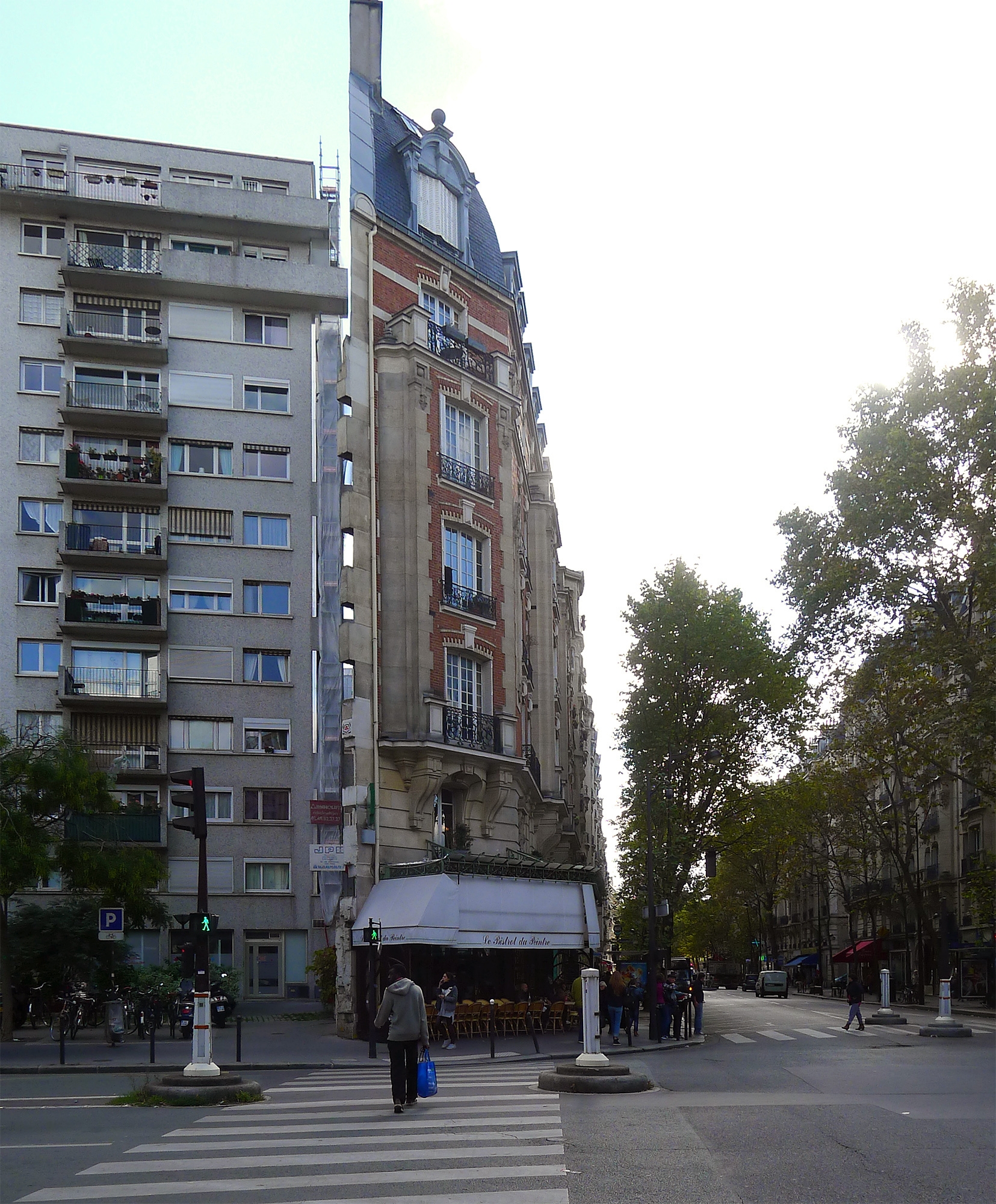
Building known as the Bistrot du peintre

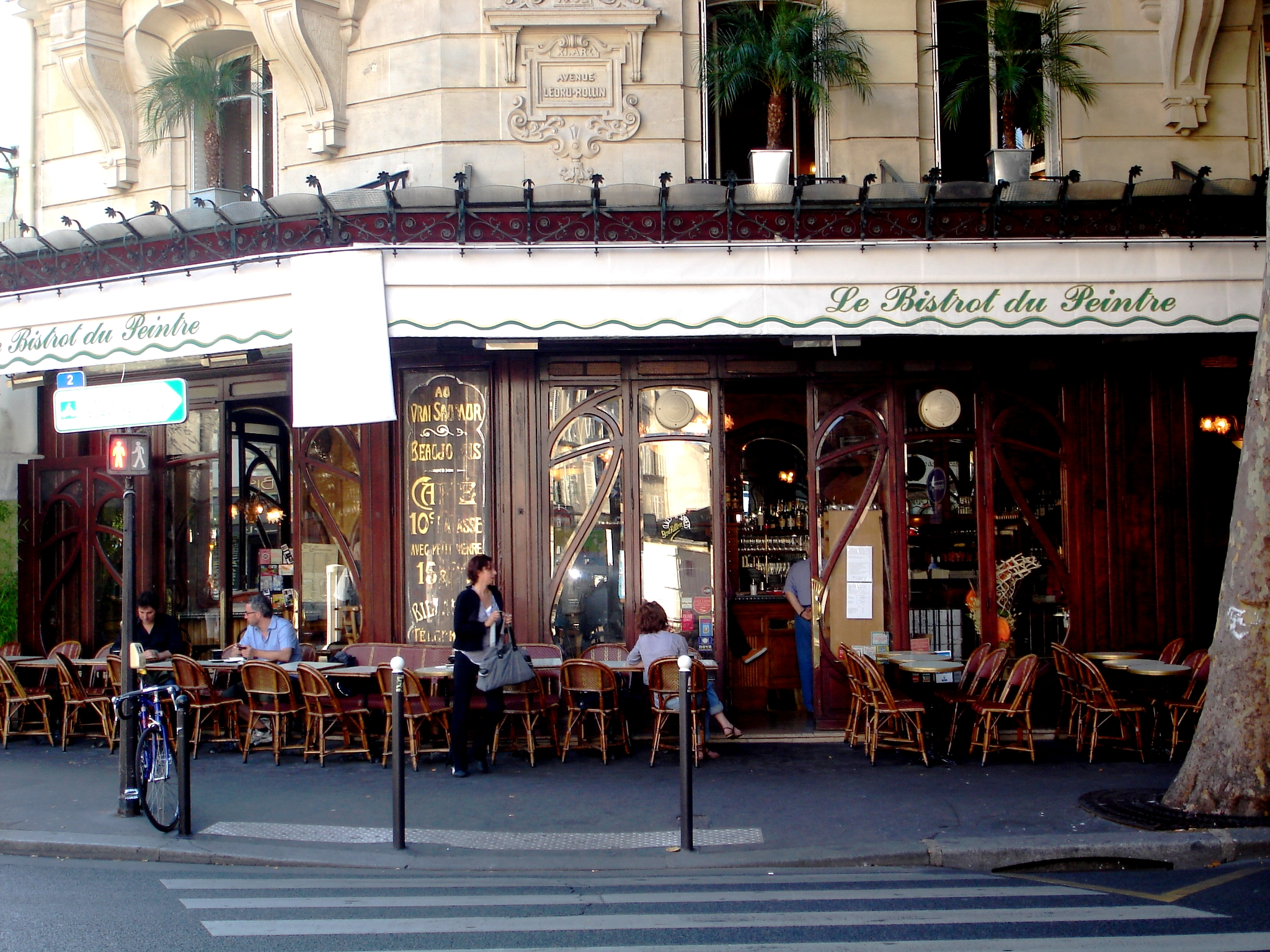
An overall view of the brasserie

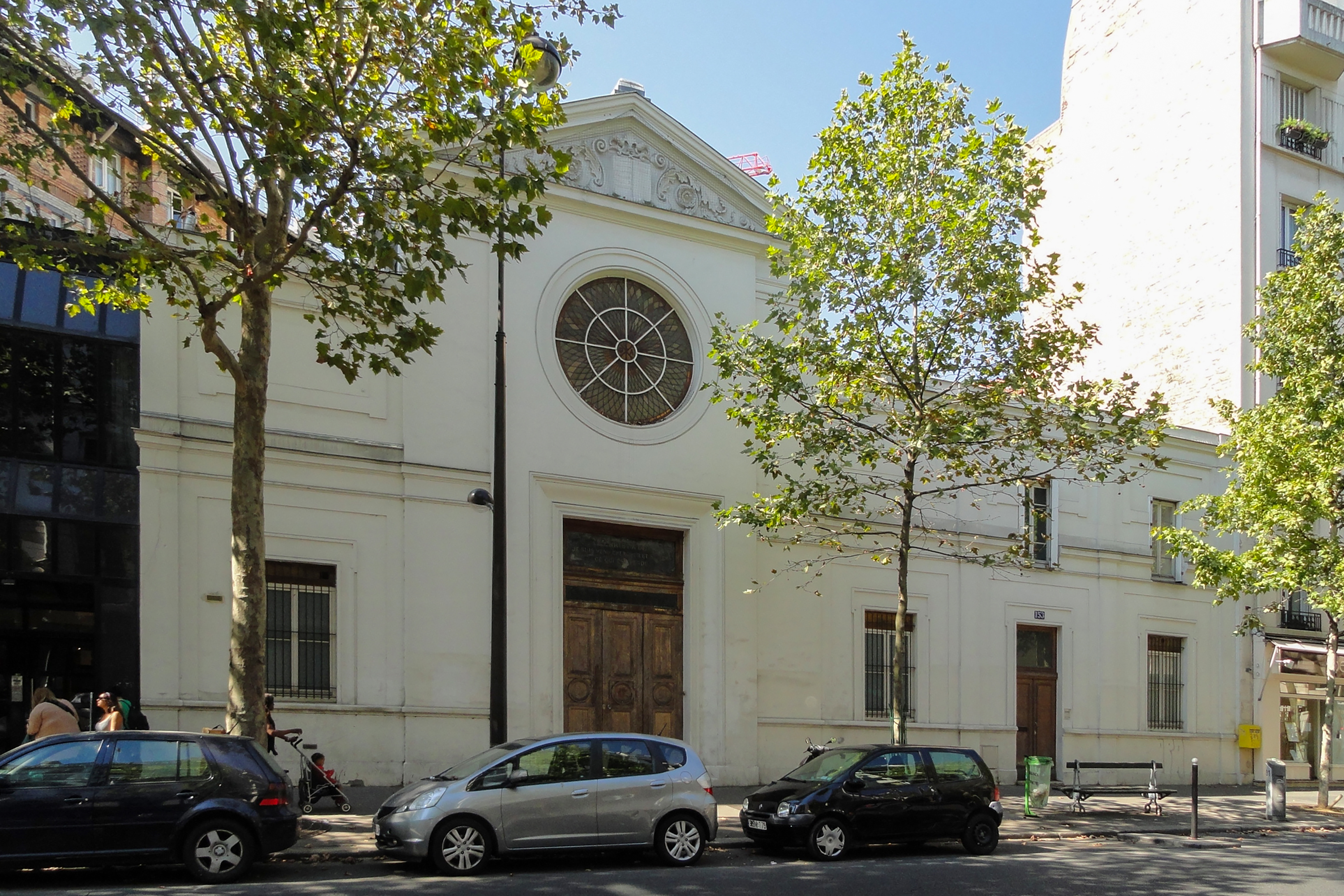
Exterior of the former Protestant church
