= Saint-Antoine-des-Quinze-Vingts =

Church building in Paris, France

Church of Saint-Antoine des Quinze-Vingts
- Église Saint-Antoine des Quinze-Vingts
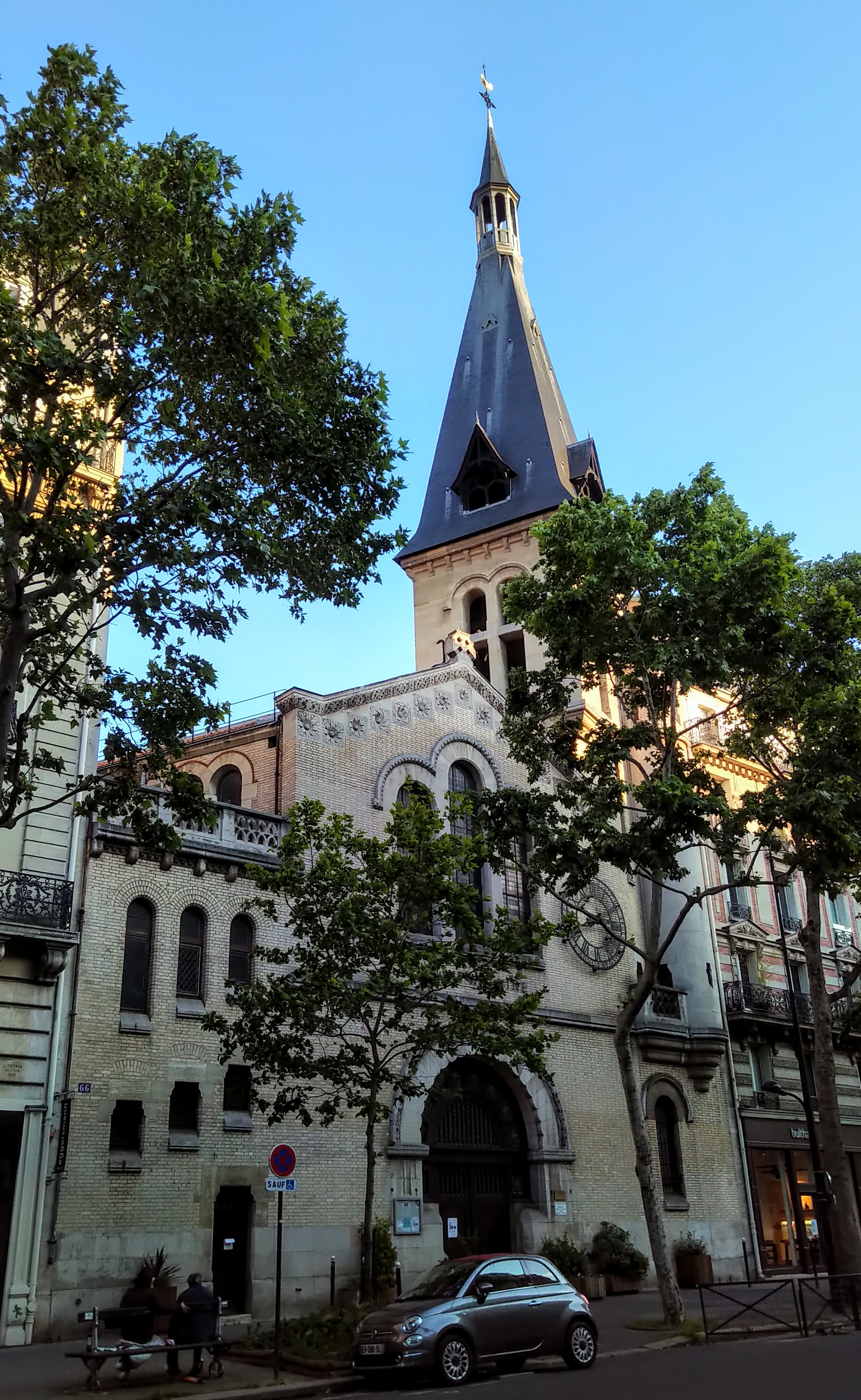
- Church of Saint-Antoine des Quinze-Vingts
- 48°50′55″N 2°22′26″E
- Location: 12th arrondissement of Paris
- Country: France
- Denomination: Roman Catholic Church
- Website: saqv.fr

Saint-Antoine des Quinze-Vingts (French pronunciation: [sɛ̃.t‿ɑ̃.twan de kɛ̃z vɛ̃]) is a Roman Catholic parish church located at 66 Avenue Ledru Rollin in the 12th arrondissement of Paris. (Mailing address: 57 rue Traversière, 75012 Paris.)

== History ==
Before the French Revolution, the territory corresponding to the 12th arrondissement belonged to the 4th-arrondissement parish Saint-Paul-Saint-Louis, then to the domain of Sainte-Marguerite; however, two institutions had the privilege of exercising the "cure d'âme" ["care of souls"]: the abbey of the Cistercian nuns of Saint-Antoine des Champs and the Résidence Quinze-Vingts, originally founded -- although in a different location -- by King Louis IX (Saint Louis) in the 13th century.

The abbey was abolished during the Revolution (in 1790) and the monastery became the foundation of Saint-Antoine Hospital in 1795. The new parish of Saint-Antoine des Quinze-Vingts was created on 4 February 1791, and originally used the abbey church as its place of worship. It was sold as Bien national in 1798 and destroyed. For a century thereafter, the chapel Saint-Rémi of the Résidence XV-XX served as a parish church, until the construction of the present church which was completed in 1903 and dedicated to Anthony the Great on 11 November 1909.

=== Detailed project and construction history ===
- March 1898: The Archbishop of Paris, Cardinal Richard, appointed abbot Rivière as curé, with the mission of leaving the premises of the ophthalmological hospital created in 1880.
- September 1898: The Council of Paris opposed the transfer of part of the land of the former Mazas prison (destroyed in 1895), their motivation being that, in their minds, they would thereby be replacing "the prison of bodies by the prison of thought".
- 1898: The purchase of an old factory in the centre of the parish territory was made possible.
- 1898–1901: Mgr. Rivière found the 400 thousand francs necessary for the purchase of the former factory. The "Société Civile Immobilière" d'Aligre was formed, and the land purchased.
- 15 December 1900: Submission of the construction dossier.
- 12 January 1901: Favorable opinion of the archbishop.
- 21 February 1902: By prefectoral decree, the church would remain the property of the city of Paris (one of the last churches built before the 1905 law)
- 17 June 1902: Laying of the first stone of "the first church of the century", built on the plans of Émile Vaudremer (1829-1914), architect of Saint-Pierre-de-Montrouge (1862), and his student Lucien Roy.
- 28 December 1903: Blessing of the church.
- January 1910: 1910 Great Flood of Paris
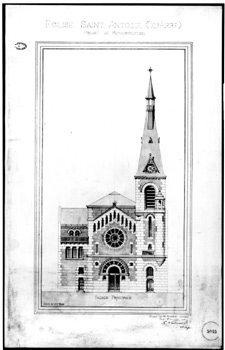
Facade project avenue Ledru Rollin in 1900

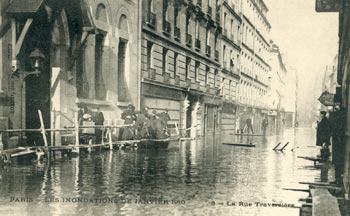
1910 Flood of the Seine, rue Traversiere

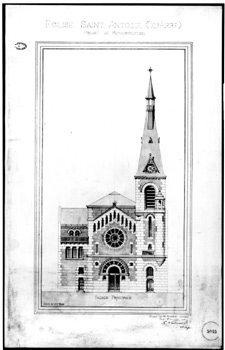
Facade project for Saint Antoine of the XV-XX (1900)

- 11 November 1911: Inauguration of the church.

== Description ==
=== Architecture ===
The church is built of brick and stone on a basilical plan in a Romanesque Revival architecture. Some parts and decorations are typical of the Art Nouveau of the École de Nancy.

The facade is brick and stone. It opens with a scalloped semi-circular gate with three lancet windows.

The dome of the choir is made of moulded glass bonded with cement.

The church is globally oriented East-West. It has a bell tower built on the first bays of the nave, covered with a short slate covered spire. It dominates the avenue Ledru-Rollin.

The church has a secondary access at 57 rue Traversière.

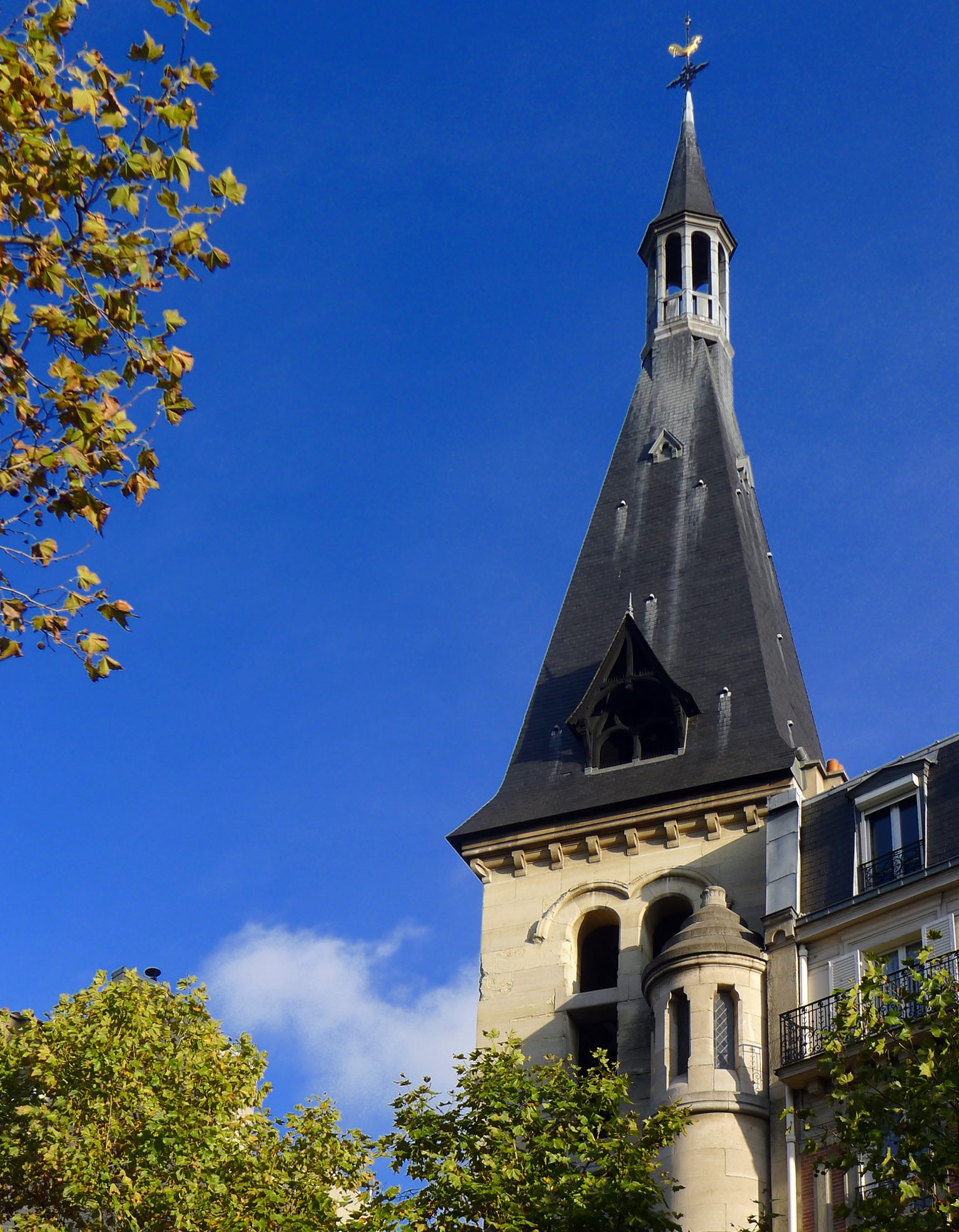
Bell tower

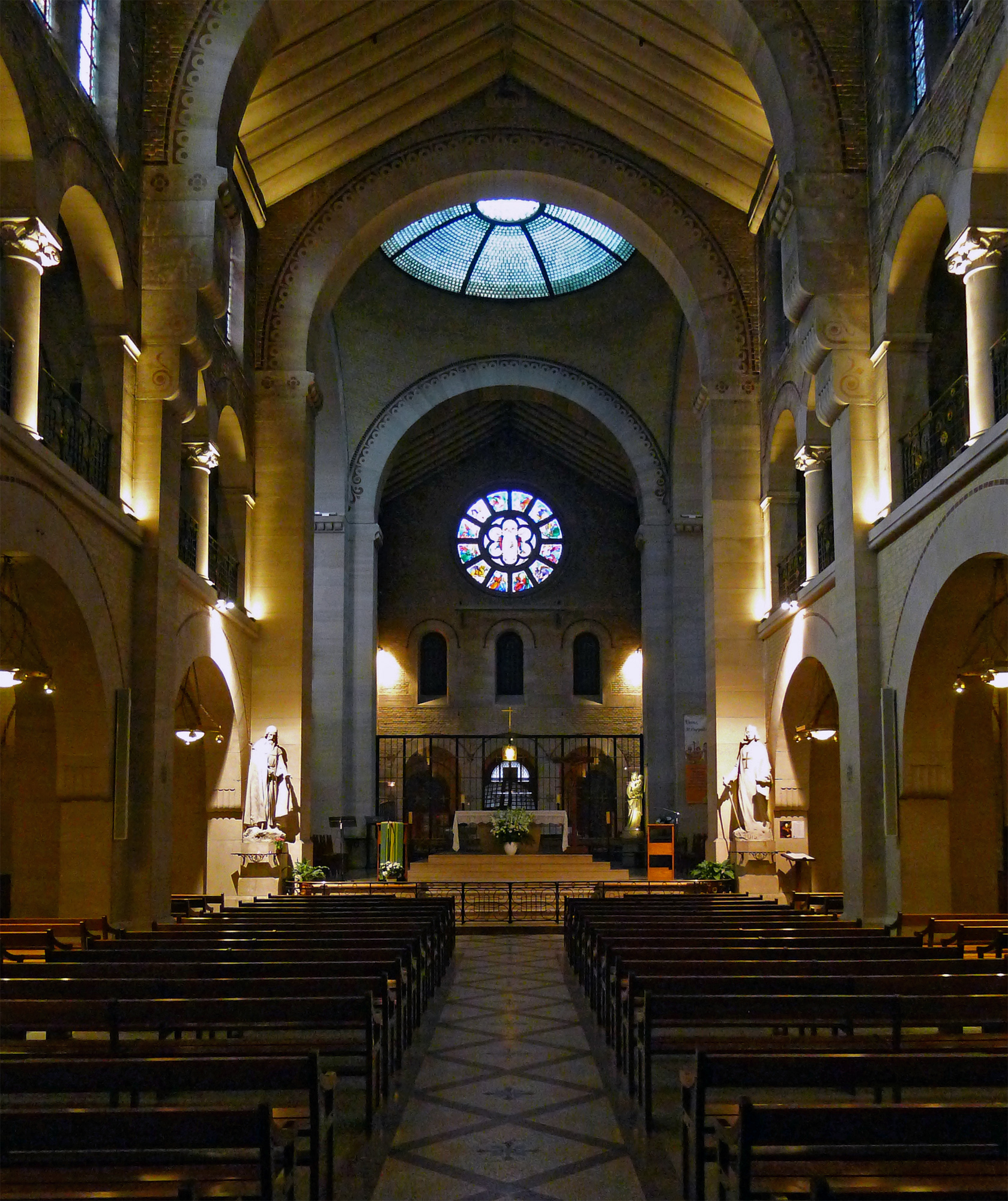
Nave

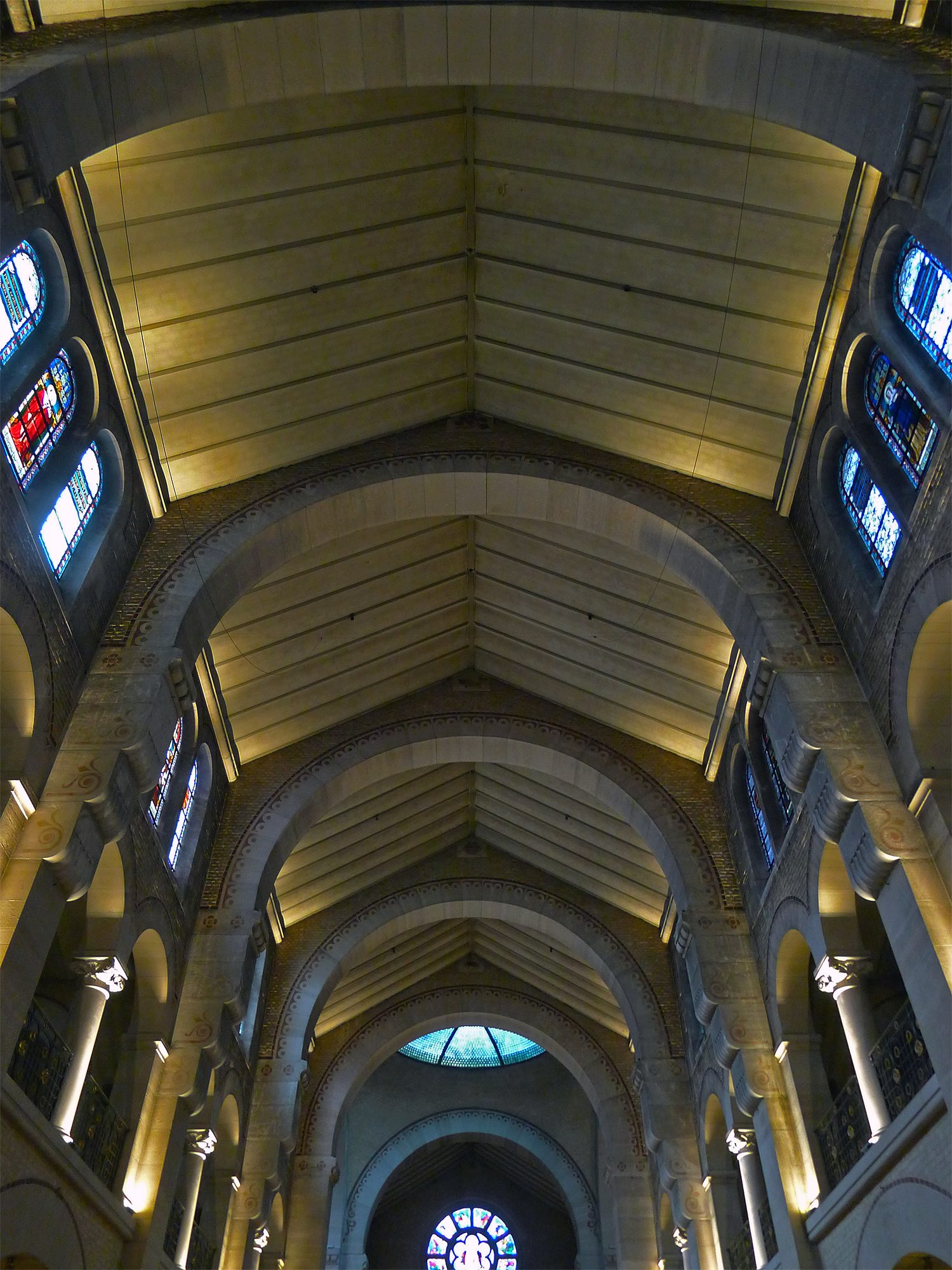
Vault of the nave

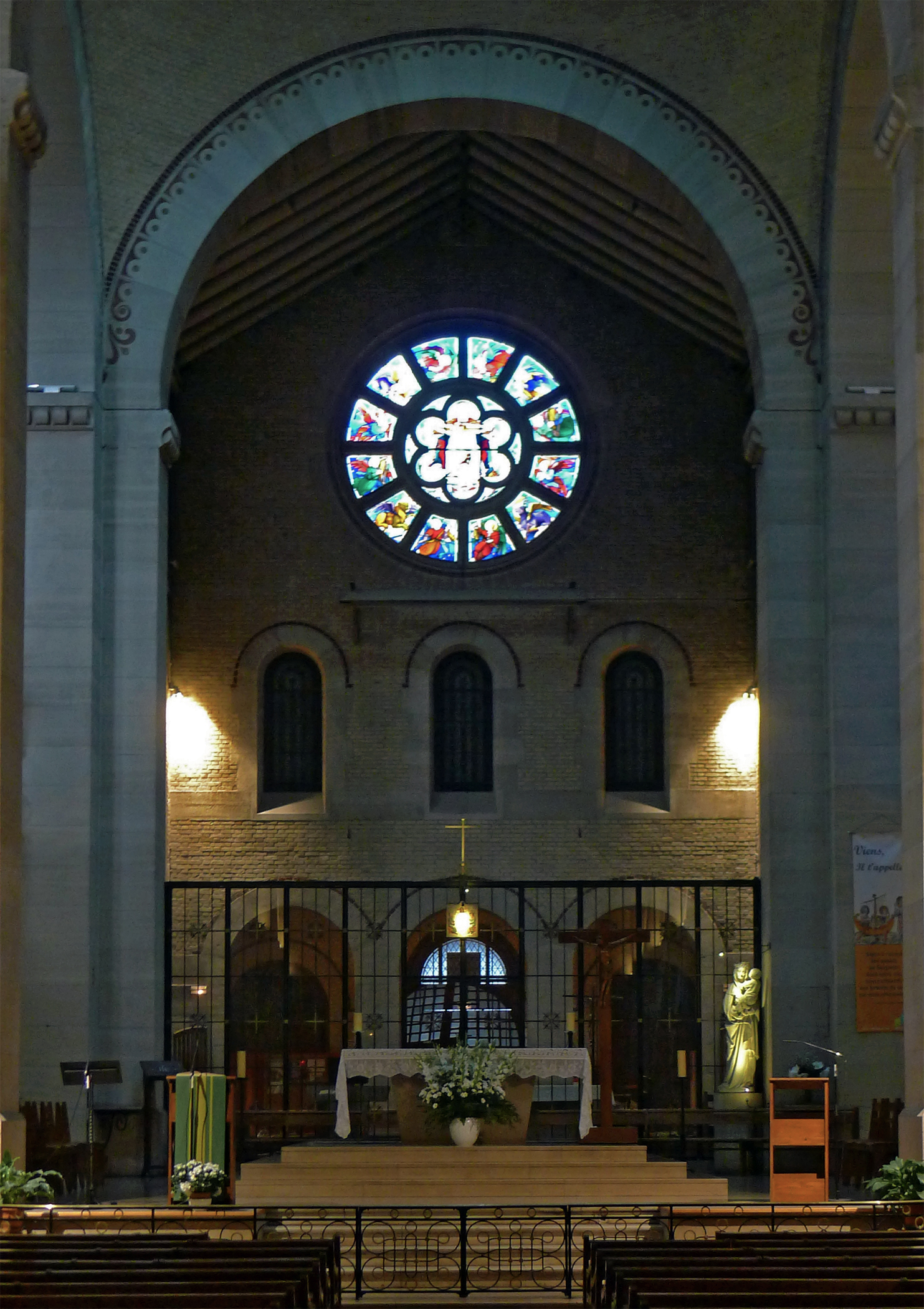
Choir

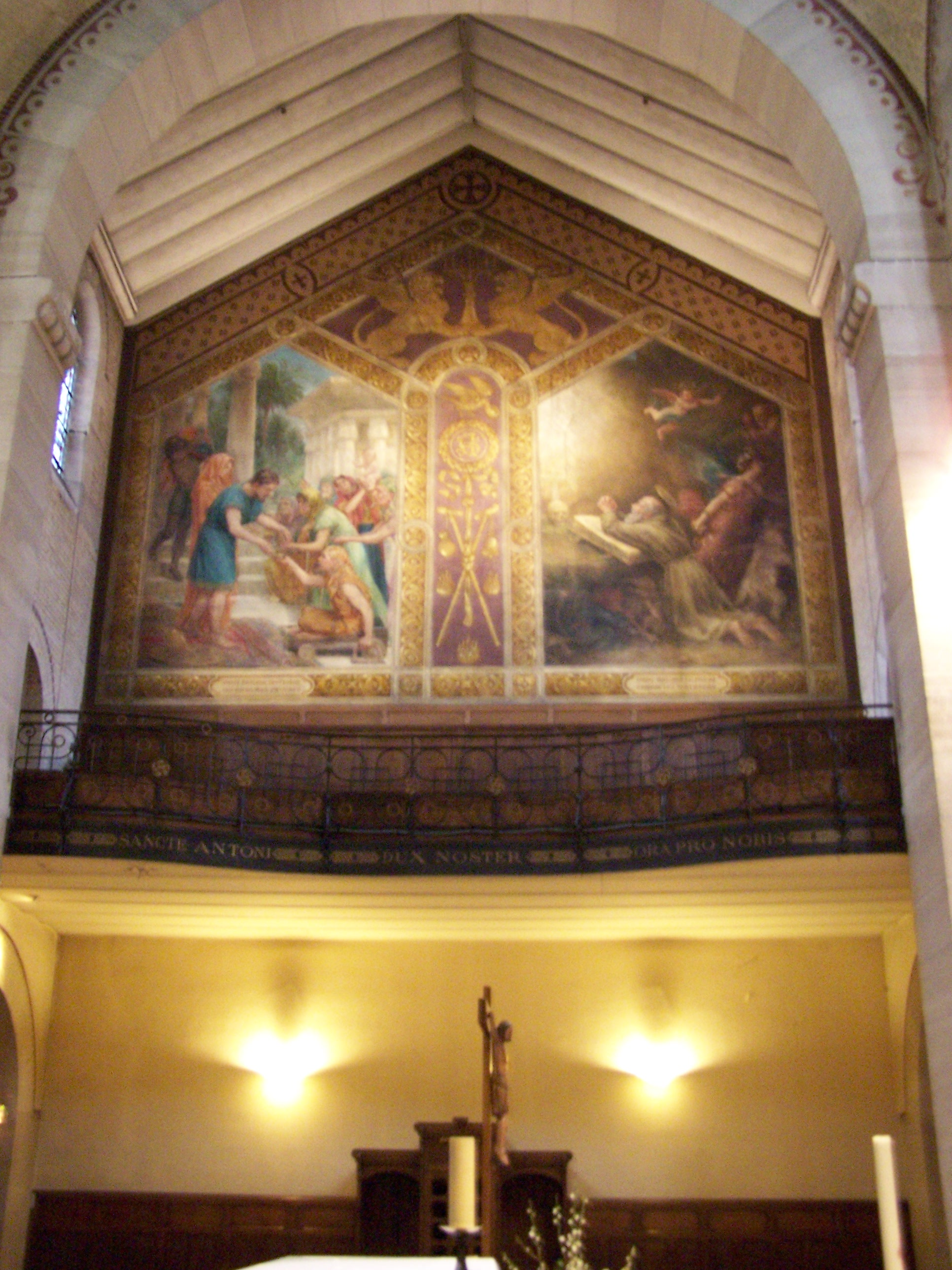
Right transept

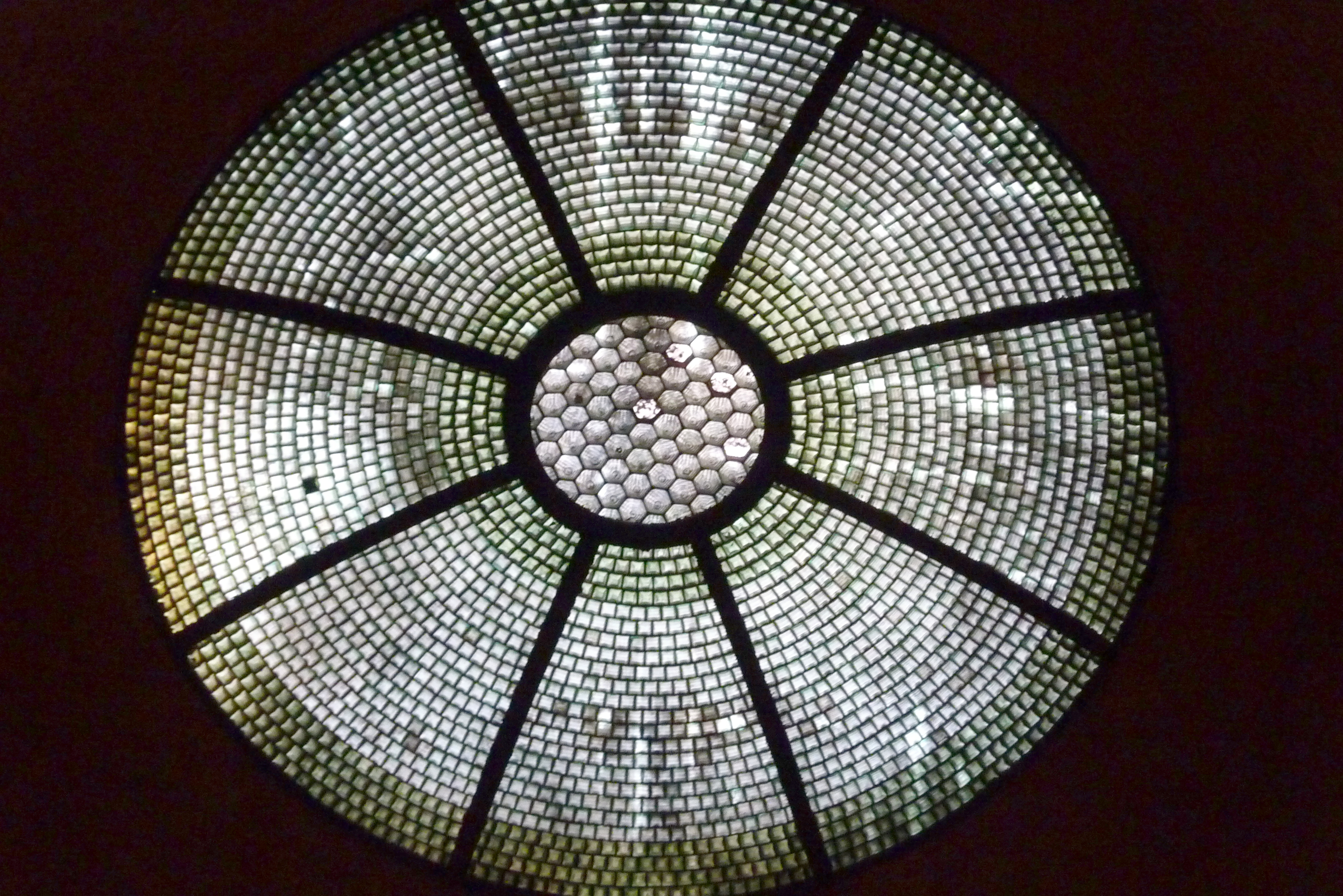
Glass canopy above the choir

=== Furniture and works of art ===
==== Statuary ====
The choir is framed by two 1:1 scale statues:

- At left, Saint Anthony the Great (left) at the foot of which is a pig, a work by François-Raoul Larche
- To the right, Saint Louis crowned, holding a sword in his right hand, and in his left, the document instituting the original Résidence XV-XX in the 14th century, also by François-Raoul Larche.

In the back (south side) of the choir : a statue of the Virgin holding the Christ child.

At the entrance to the church (avenue Ledru Rollin), on the right is a statue of Saint Peter, and a large pietà (Lady of Sorrows) is located nearby, in the south aisle.

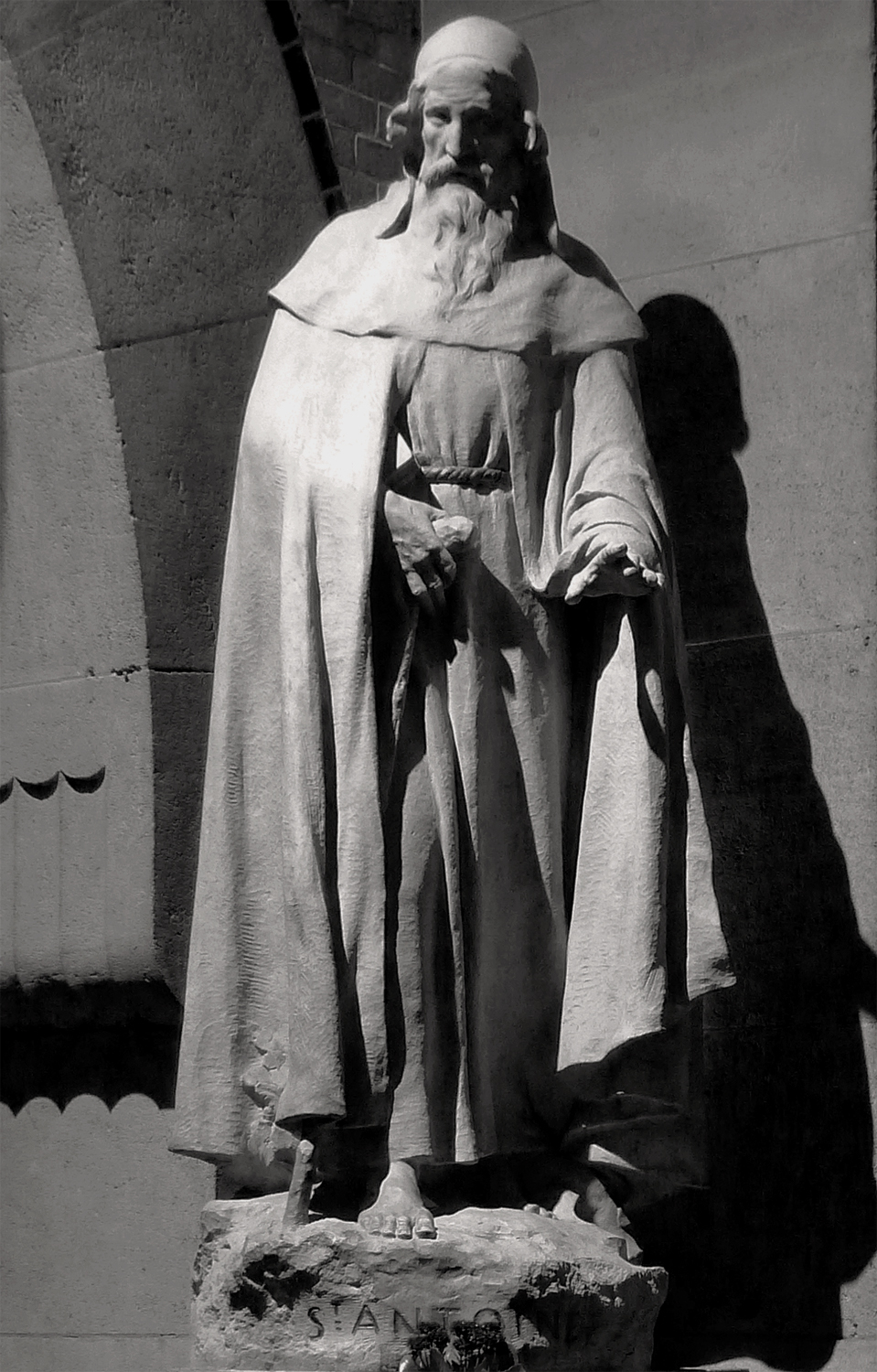
Anthony the Great

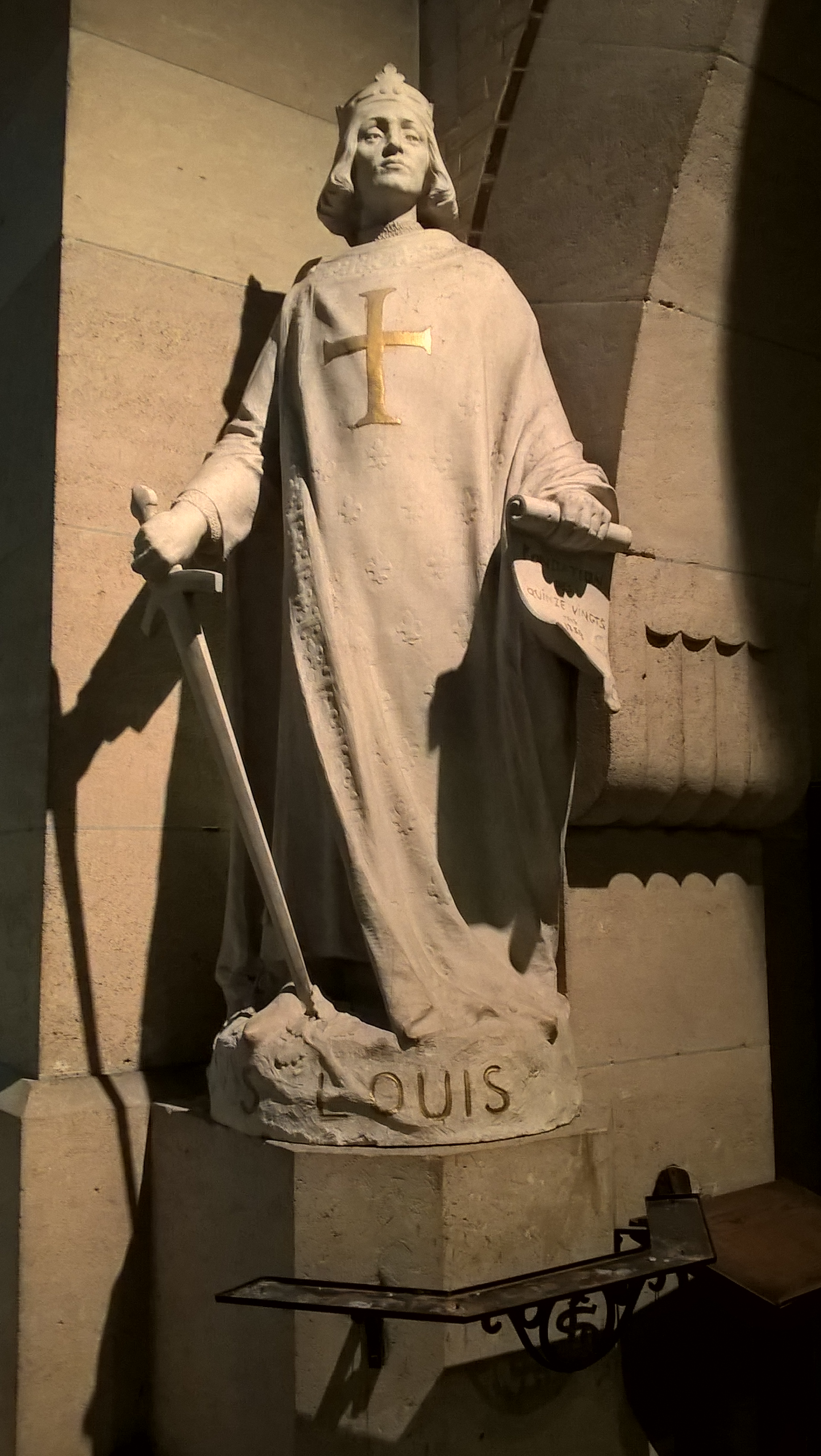
Saint Louis presenting the foundation of the Résidence XV-XX

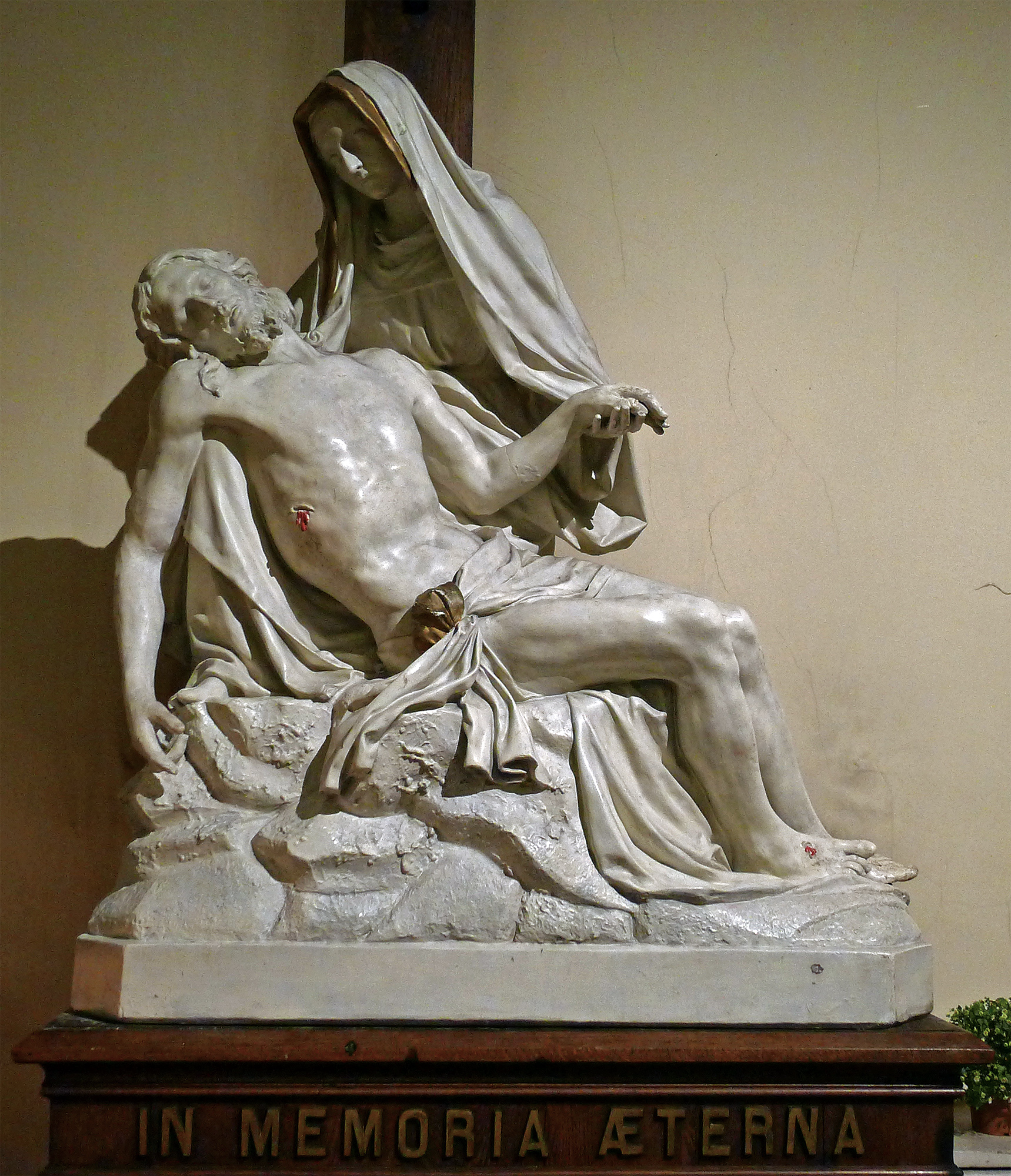
Pietà

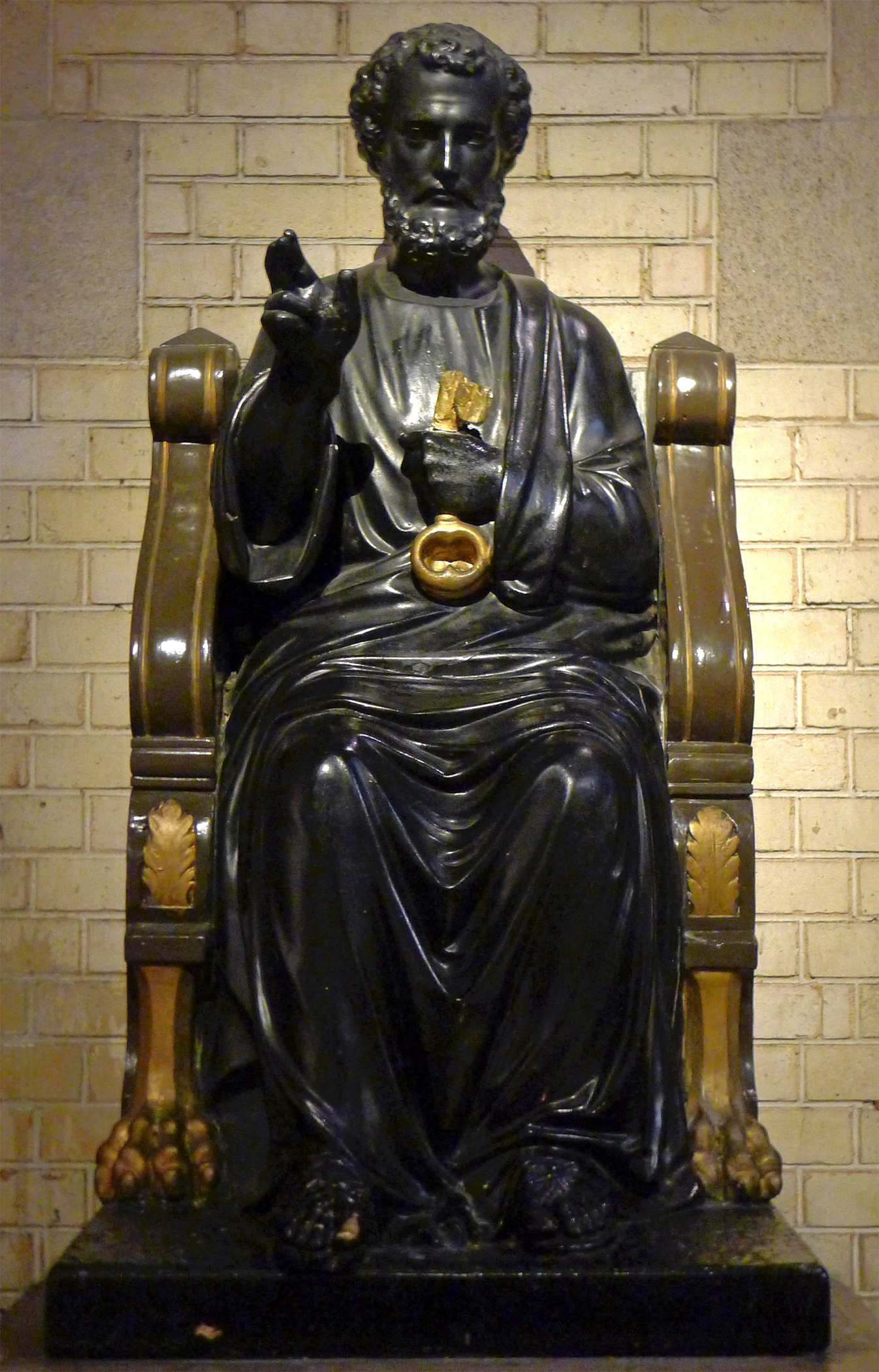
Saint Peter

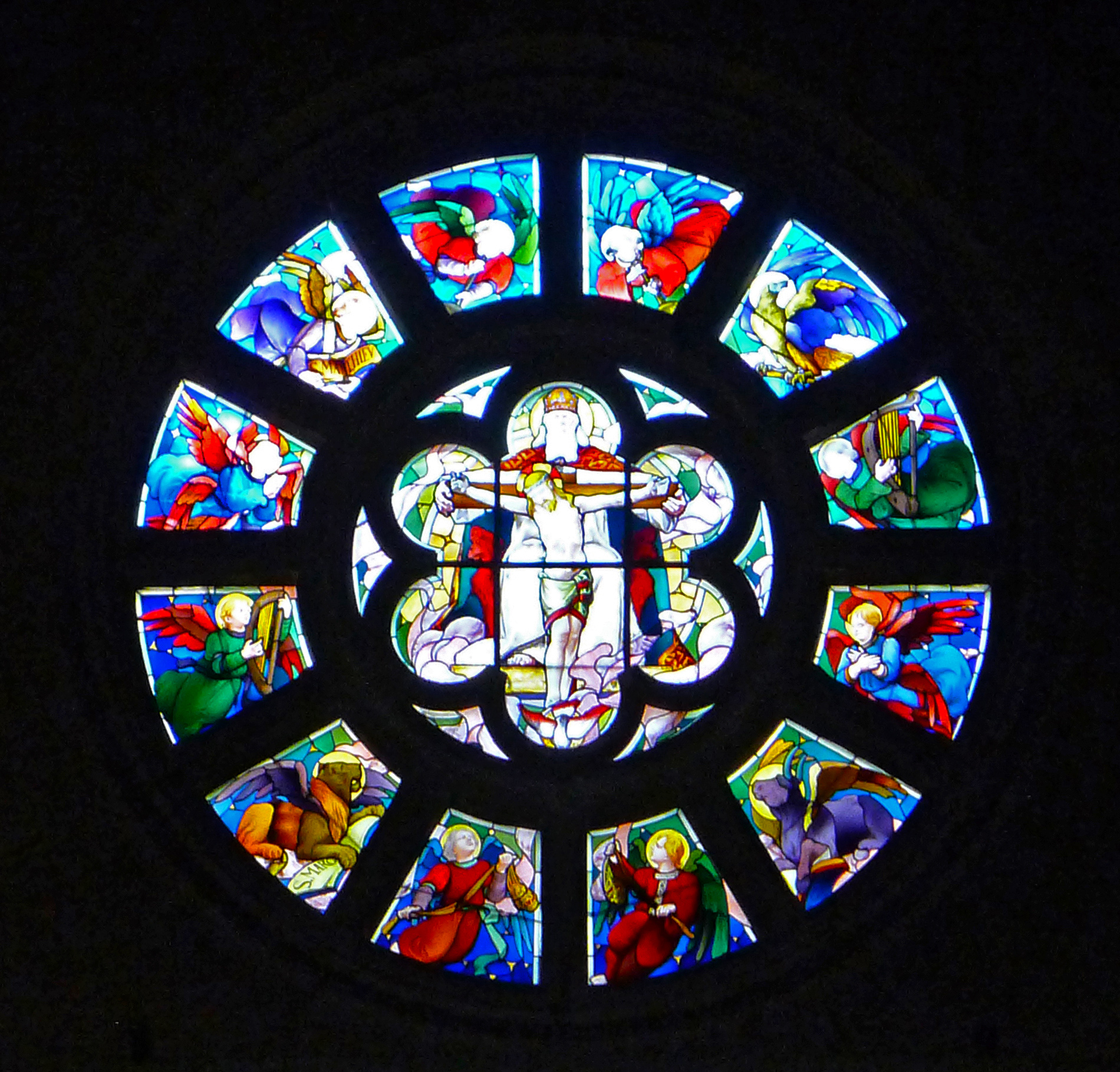
Central stained glass window of the choir

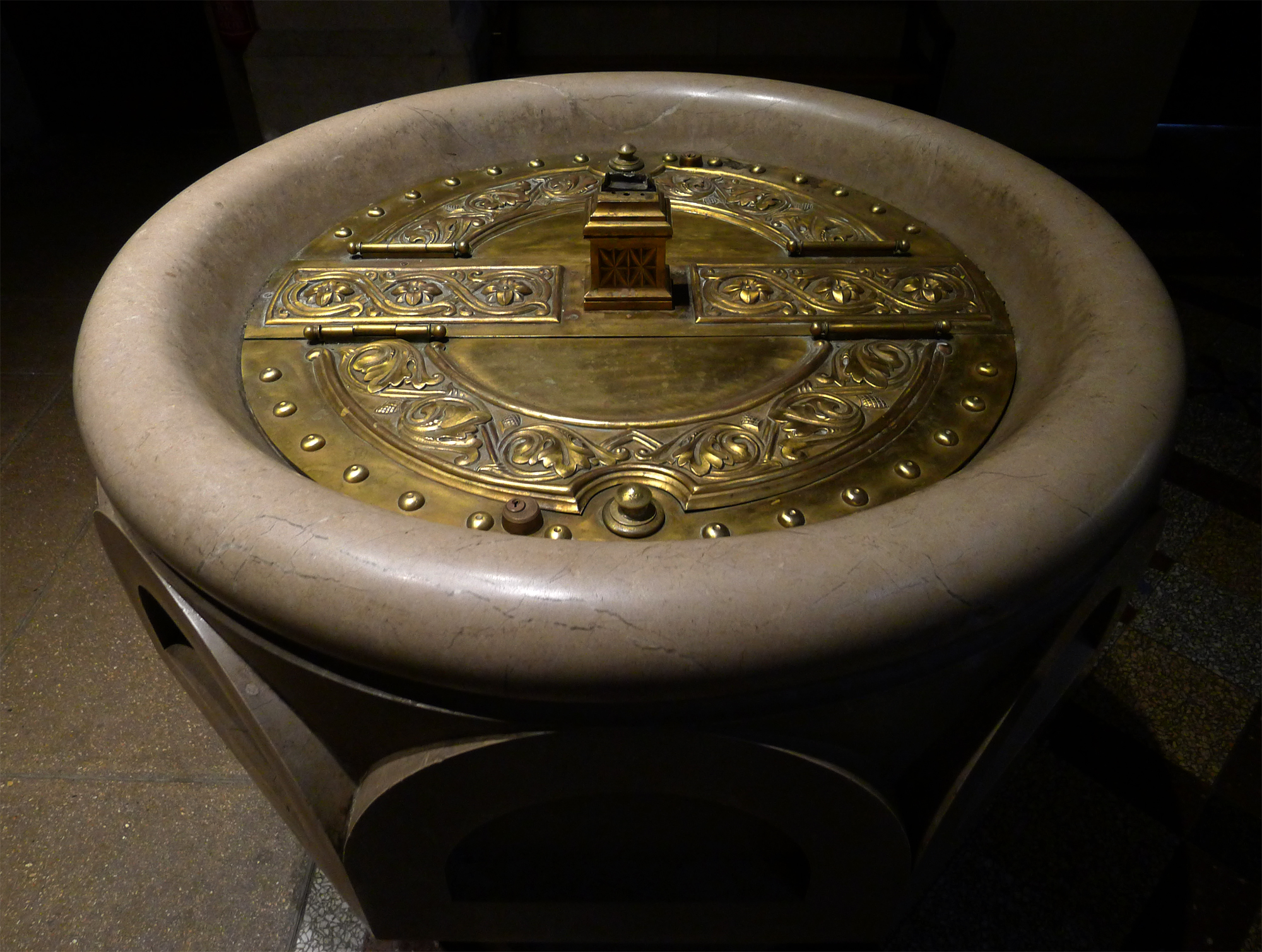
Baptismal font

==== Stained glasses ====
The central stained glass window of the choir as well as the high stained glass windows of the stands come from the Champigneulle workshops and probably dates from 1903.

The stained glass window of the rose window represents the Trinity, the Evangelists and the angels of Revelation.

Around the church, the stained glass windows represent the patron saints of the donors and the church: Anthony the Great, Saint Louis, Mary, Joseph, Saint Peter, Saint Paul, Geneviève, patron saint of Paris, Denis, Blessed Joan of Arc (she was canonized only in 1920), Saint Joan of Chantal, Mary Magdalene, Saint Elizabeth, Saint Cecilia, Saint Francis, Saint Marcel, Saint Charles, Saint Eugene, Saint Juliet, Saint Adrian.

A series of three non-figurative stained glass windows were made by the Duchemin house and installed on the wall under the rose window. Installed in 2005, they are called "centenary stained glass windows".

==== Recent developments ====
In 2009, new Stations of the Cross by Sister Dolores of the Dourgne abbey were installed in the side aisles, as well as on the glass divider between the main altar and that of the "Chapelle de semaine" (weekday chapel).

In 2015, the walls of the weekday chapel were renovated and fitted out by the architect Christophe Hébert. The following year, he designed and realized the new reception area located just inside the main entrance to the church.

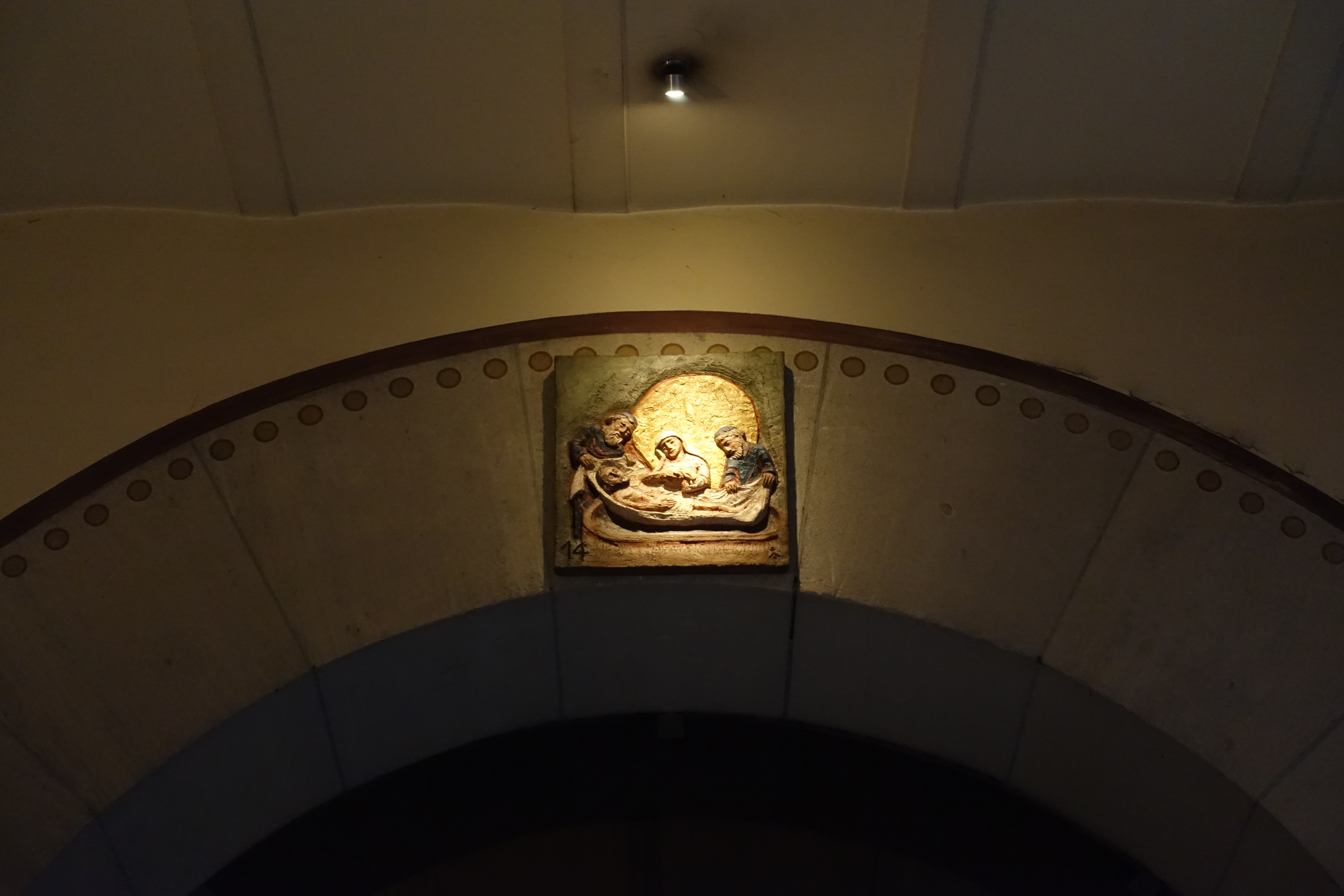
One of the new Stations of the Cross by Sr. Dolores

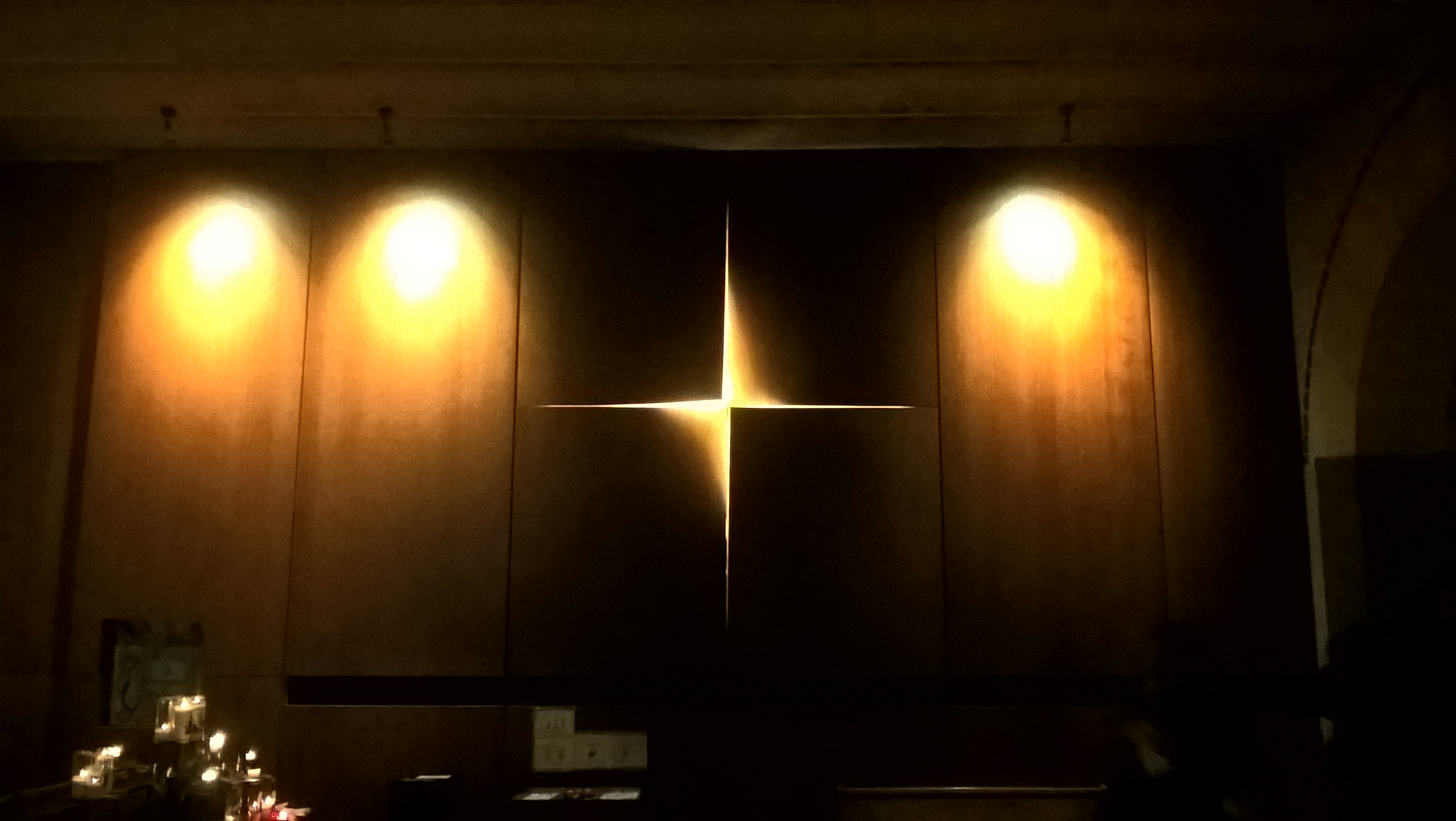
Wall of the Weekday Chapel

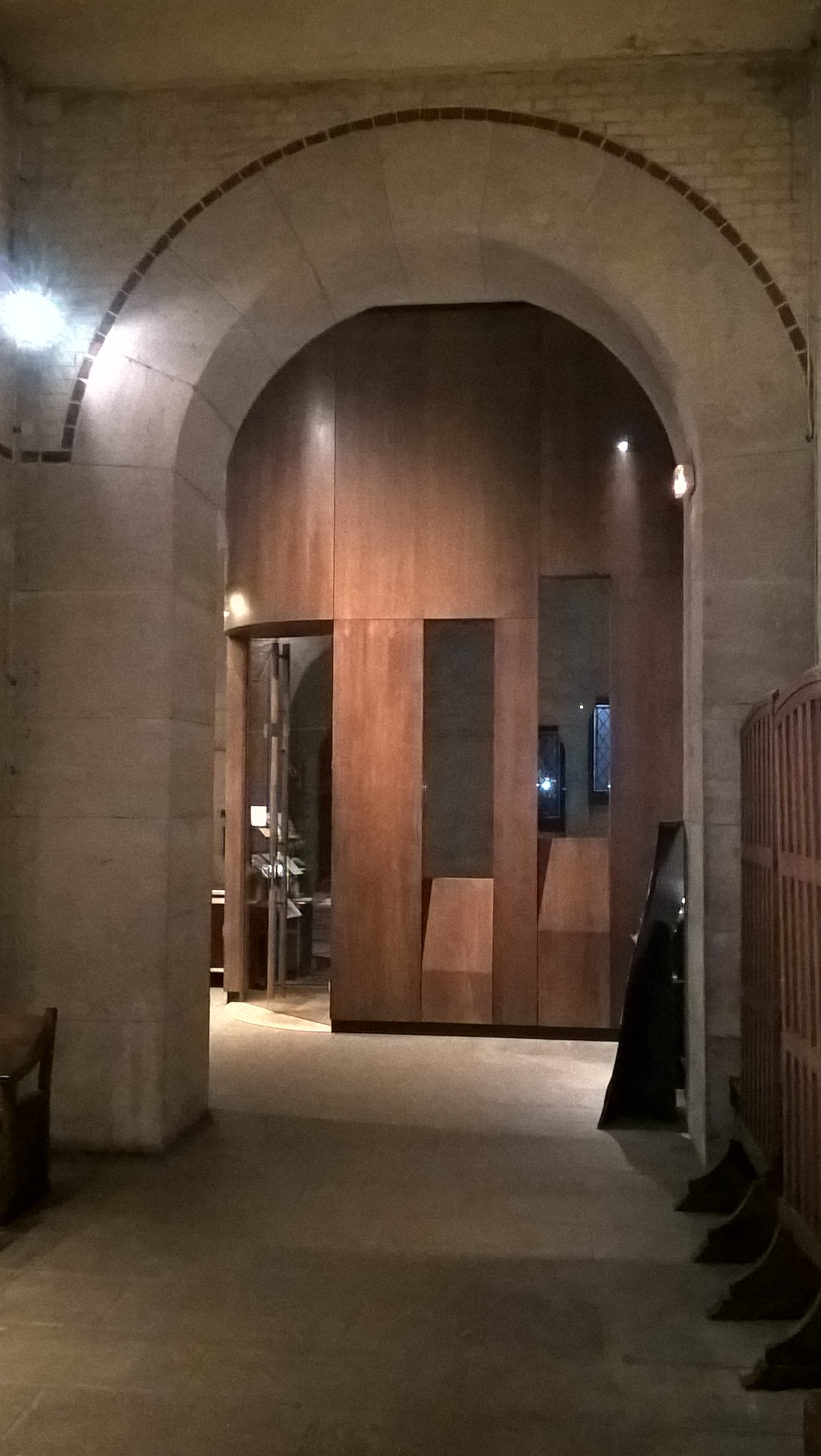
New Reception Area

=== Organs ===
The church's primary organ was constructed by Aristide Cavaillé-Coll in 1894 for a private client. When the organ was donated to the new church in 1907, it was renovated by Joseph Merklin, who built the choir organ in 1909.

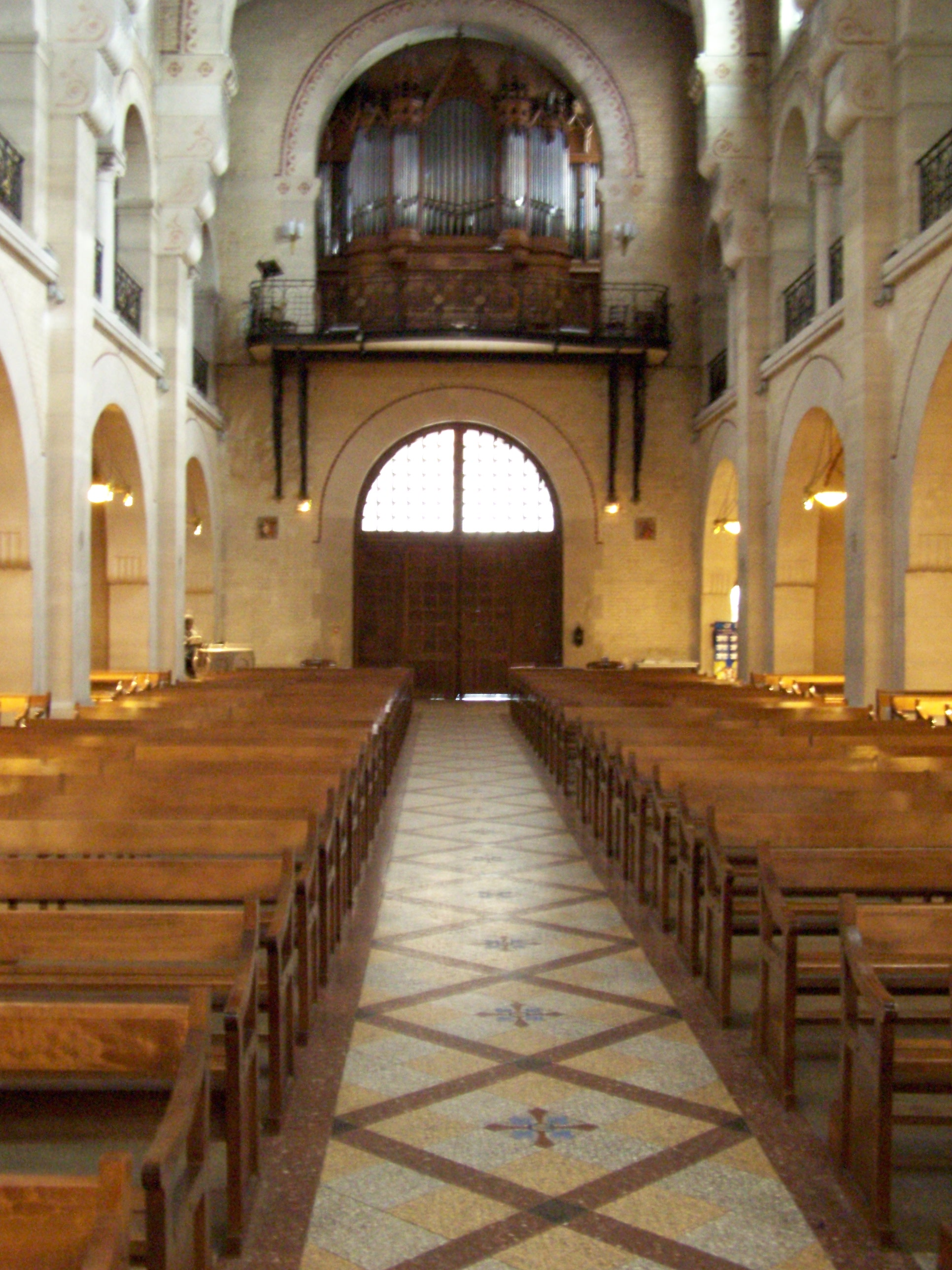
The main organ by the celebrated Cavaillé-Coll.

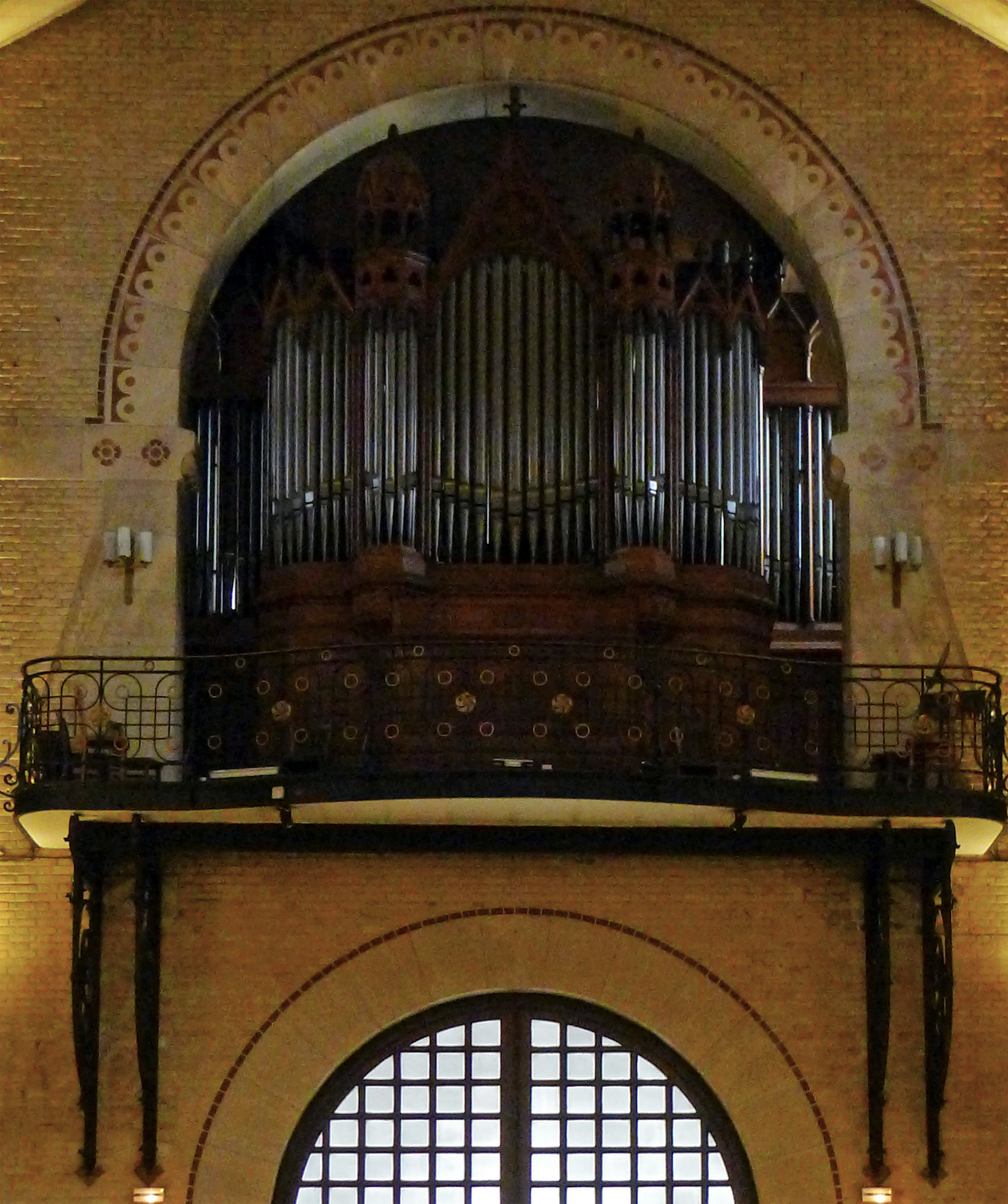

== Access ==
The church is accessible by metro via the stations Ledru-Rollin on line, and Bastille and Gare de Lyon on line, as well as by the bus lines 20, 24, 29, 57, 61, and 86.

== Bibliography ==
- Yves de Mallmann (November 2005). Saint-Antoine des Quinze-Vingts Petite Histoire d'une paroisse parisienne (in French). p. 96. ISBN 2-87601-311-8.
- B.Violle (1982). Paris, son Eglise, ses églises, Histoire, Art, Foi (in French). Paris: Éditions du Cerf.
